= Heroes' Cemetery, Timișoara =

Heroes' Cemetery
- Cimitirul Eroilor
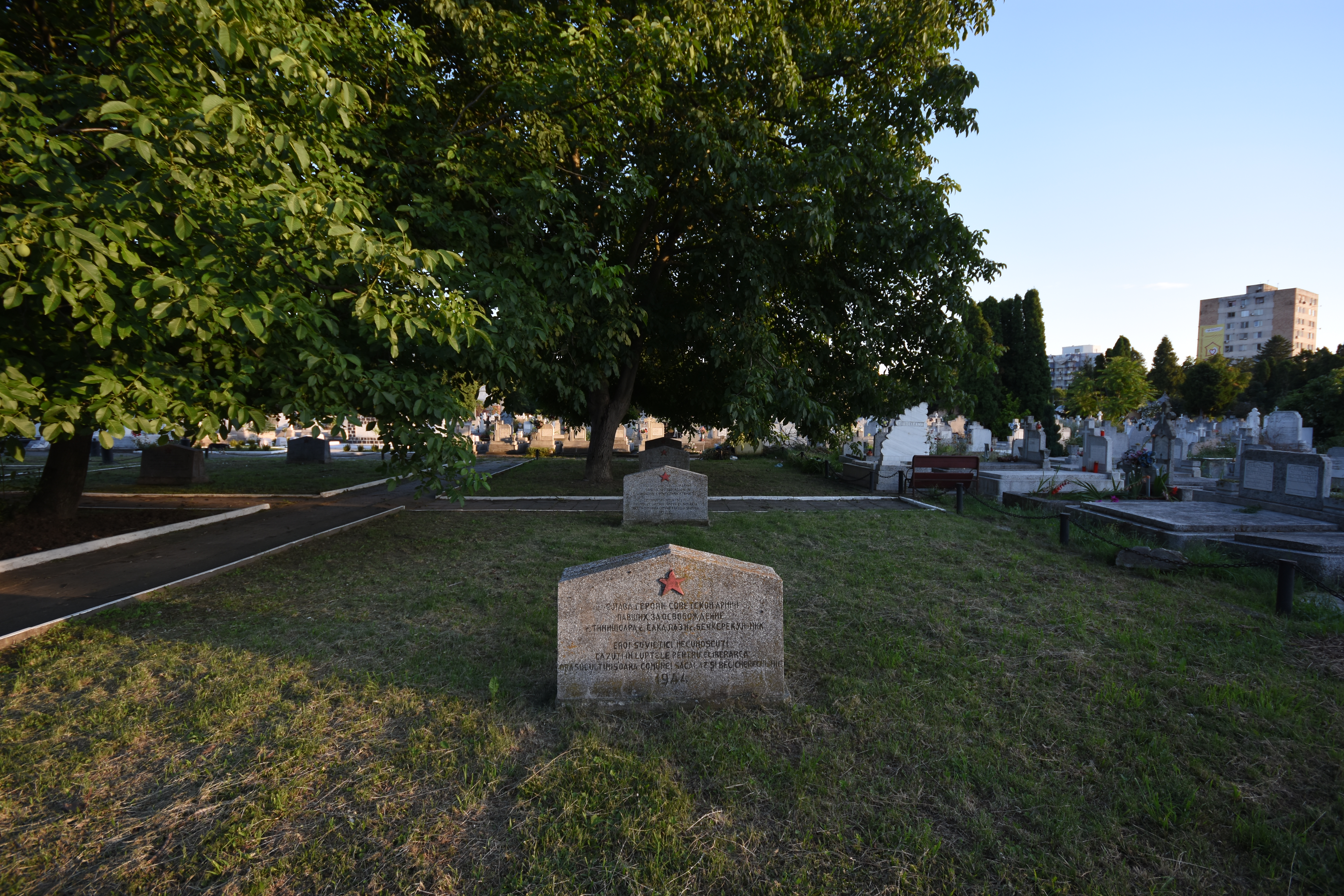
- Interactive map of Heroes' Cemetery

Details
- Location: Timișoara, Romania
- Coordinates: 45°46′8″N 21°13′36″E
- Owned by: DenisAlex SRL

The Heroes' Cemetery (Romanian: Cimitirul Eroilor), or Lipovei Cemetery, is a cemetery in Timișoara, Romania, where soldiers and revolutionaries are buried, as well as artists, film and theater actors, poets, and writers.

== Monuments ==
=== Memorial Ensemble ===
The Memorial Ensemble at Heroes' Cemetery was erected in 1990, a year following the 1989 Revolution, to honor those who lost their lives during the event. The ensemble features an open chapel, symbolic gravestones for the fallen, and an eternal flame.

The flame base was built by Ionel Pop, and the other two works were created by architects Pompiliu Alămoreanu and Liviu Brebe, the two being the winners of a selection from several other projects by architects from Timișoara. The work was done with the support of construction companies from Timișoara, the City Hall, and the former prefect Florentin Cârpanu.

=== Fidelity Column ===
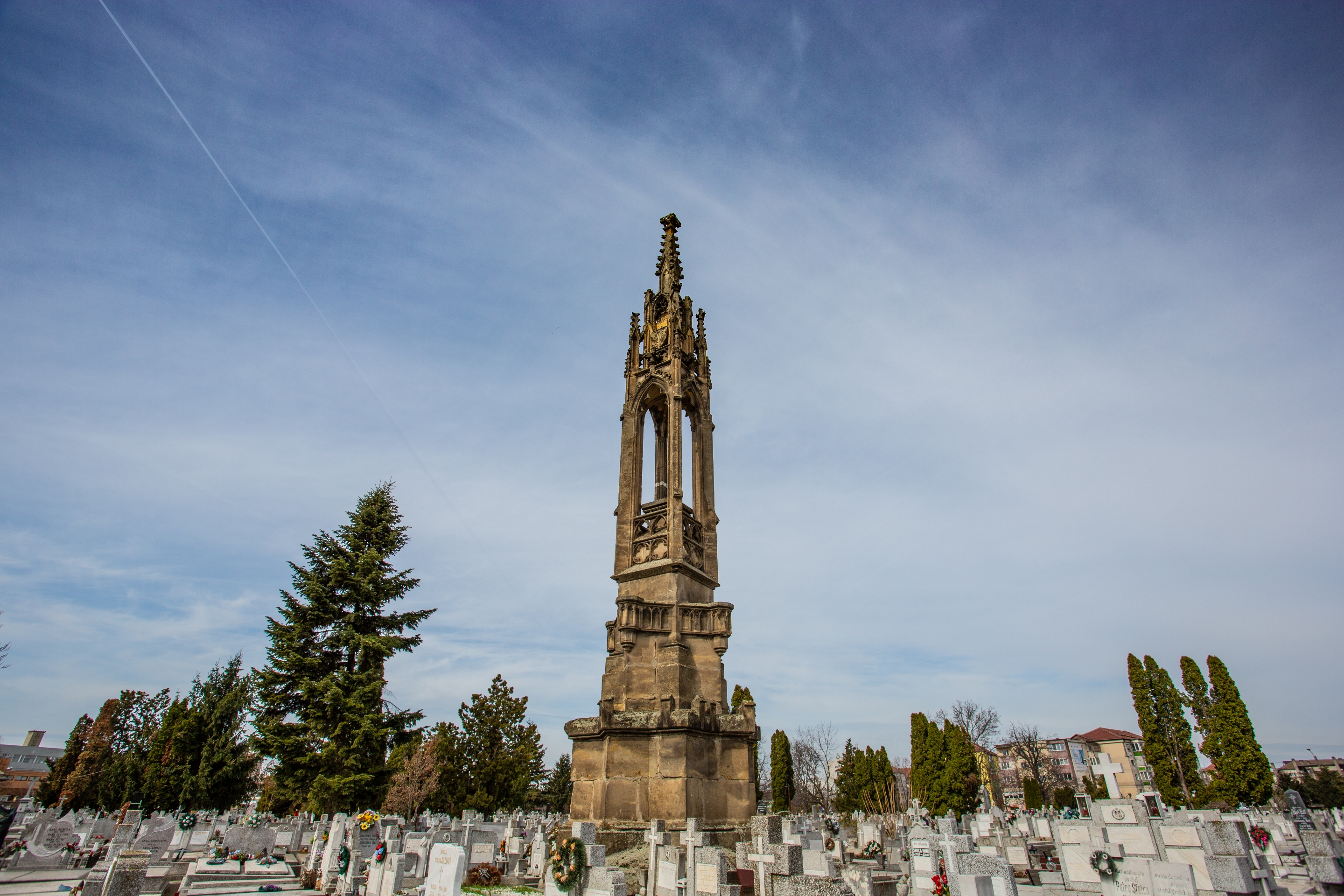
Fidelity Column

The Victory Monument, or Fidelity Column, symbolizes Austrian Emperor Franz Joseph I's appreciation for the local troops who defended Timișoara for 107 days during the 1848–1849 conflict against the Hungarian revolutionaries.

The Fidelity Column, designed by architect Josef Kranner, was unveiled in 1853 with the emperor in attendance. The statues of the column were sculpted by Josef Max, who also created one of the statues on Prague's renowned Charles Bridge. This monument replaced the Holy Trinity statue, which was relocated to a site near the current Continental Hotel. In 1934, the Holy Trinity statue was moved back to Liberty Square, where it still stands today, while the Fidelity Column was transferred for ideological reasons to the cemetery on Calea Lipovei. The monument was placed near the mass grave of Austrian soldiers who perished in 1849. During the 1960s, the area was still enclosed by cannons and chains, but as the cemetery expanded, these barriers were removed.

=== St. Catherine Obelisk ===
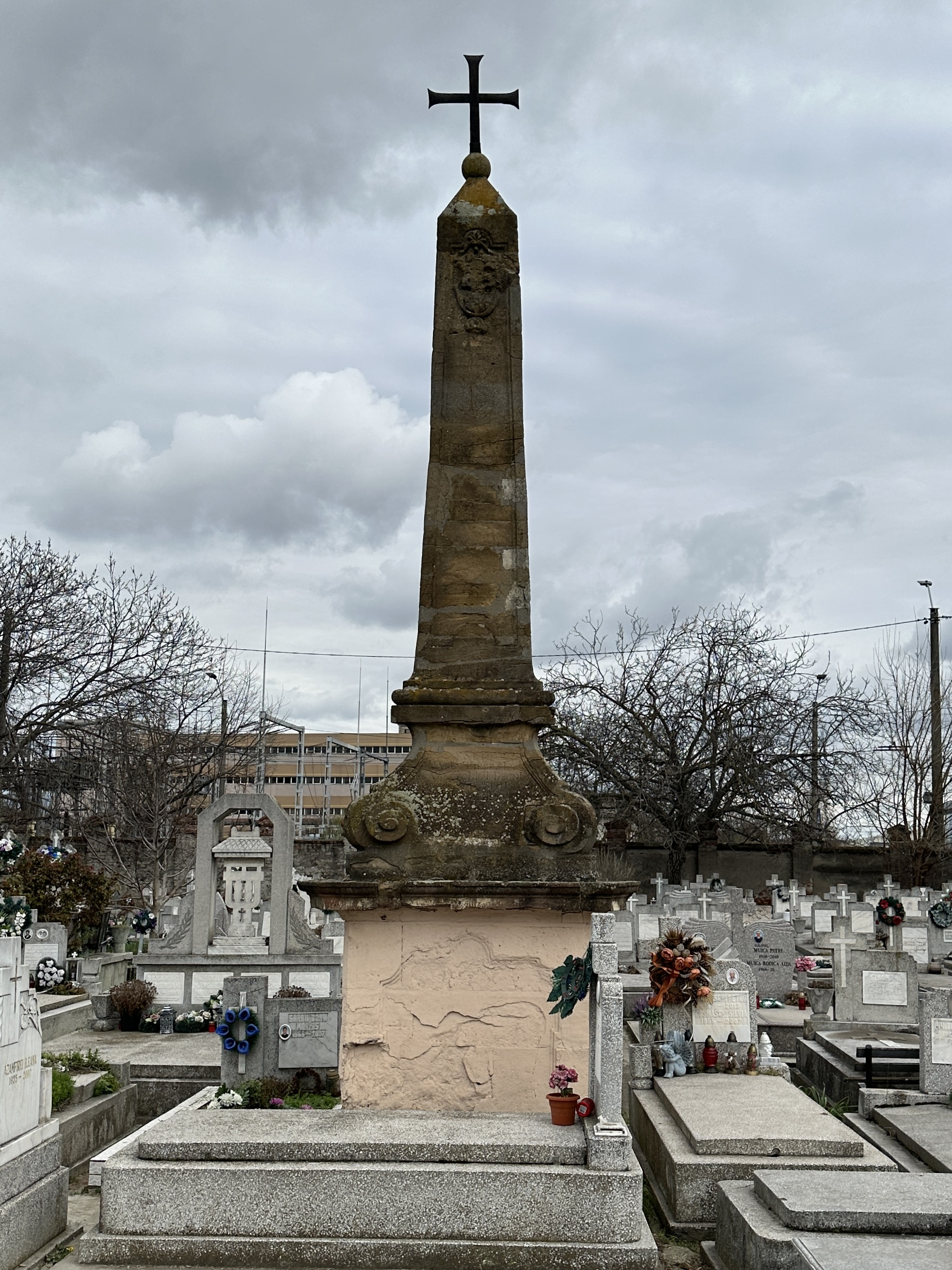
St. Catherine Obelisk

The monument was erected in 1763 at the site of the altar of the old Saint Catherine Church, which was built in 1333 during the reign of King Charles Robert and where Franciscan priests were buried. The identity of the obelisk's creator remains unknown, though it is believed to have been an Austrian architect. It stood in the field for 50 years until 1902, when the Carmen Sylva Pedagogical High School was constructed on the same site. The monument remained in front of the high school until 1933. For a long time, it stood beside the barrier of the new Timișoara–Orșova railway line. When C. D. Loga Boulevard was built, the statue was positioned in the road and later moved to its current location, near Villa International, where a park once stood. In 1963, as new constructions began in the area, the monument was relocated to the Heroes' Cemetery.

=== French Quarter ===
At the Heroes' Cemetery, 24 French soldiers from General Berthelot's mission, who served in the French 17th Oriental Division and remained there until 1919, are buried. After the war, many families of the fallen soldiers requested their repatriation. In the 1930s, Romanian authorities chose to consolidate the soldiers' graves at the Heroes' Cemetery, creating a French Quarter where the 24 graves were gathered. A war memorial, a large cross, was erected in this area to honor the heroes.
