= Fidelity Column =

- Coloana Fidelității
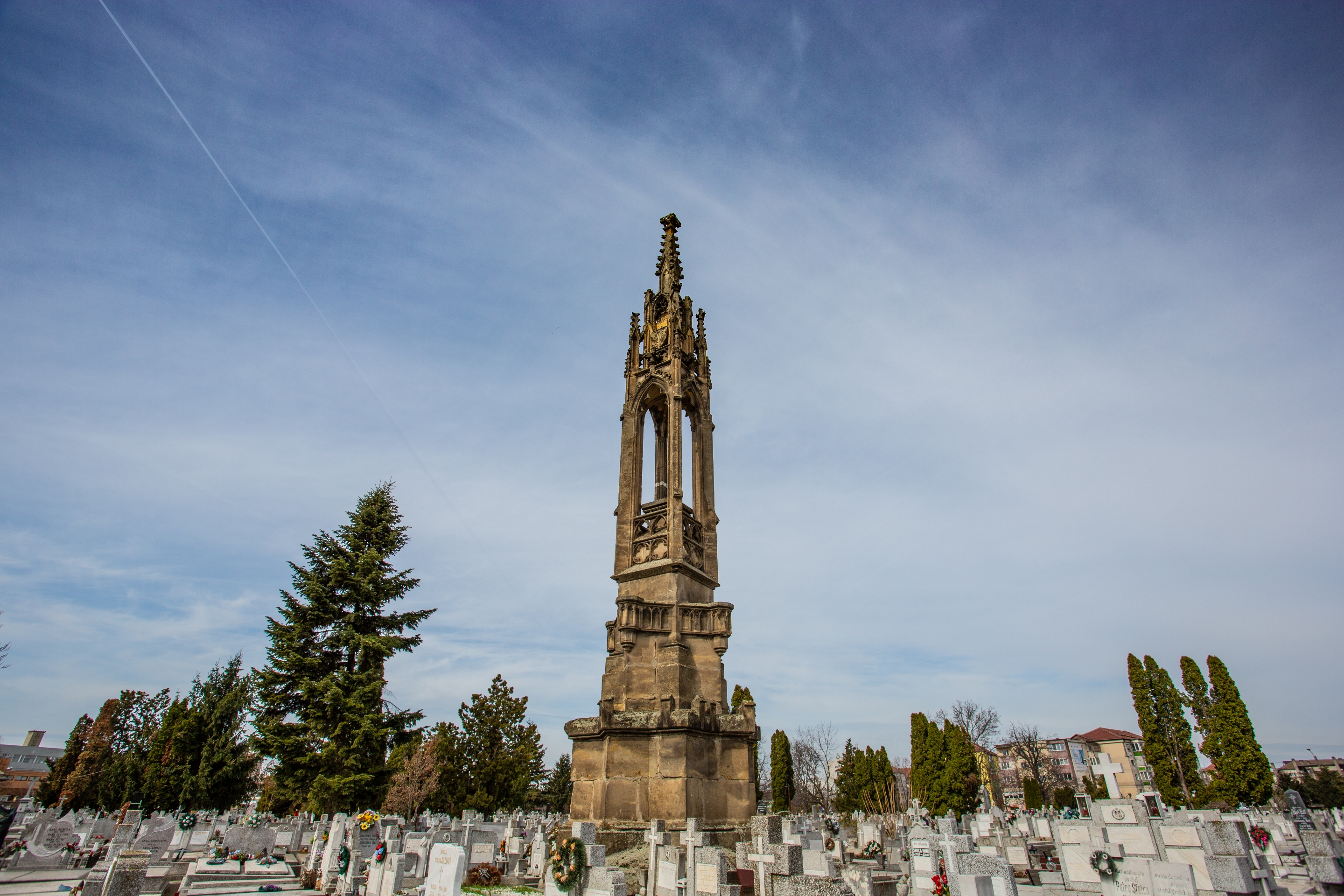
- 45°46′8″N 21°13′36″E
- Location: Heroes' Cemetery, Timișoara, Romania
- Designer: Josef Kranner
- Type: Statue
- Material: Stone
- Height: 20 m
- Beginning date: 1852
- Opening date: 1853
- LMI code: TM-IV-m-A-06330

Fidelity Column, also known as Victory Monument, is a statue located in Heroes' Cemetery of Timișoara's Lipovei district. The statue was donated to Timișoara in 1853 by Emperor Franz Joseph I as a sign of his gratitude for the resistance shown during the Hungarian Revolution and War of Independence of 1848–1849. It is inscribed in the list of historical monuments with the code TM-IV-m-A-06330.

== History ==
Fidelity Column is almost 20 meters high, is made in neo-Gothic style, and the pedestal is a fortress with monsters reminiscent of Gothic cathedrals. They represented the defeated Hungarian revolutionaries during the siege of Timișoara (1849). The column was built three years later. The foundation stone of the monument dedicated to those who lost their lives in the siege was laid by Emperor Franz Joseph I himself. The inauguration took place in 1853, in Prinz-Eugen-Platz/Jenő herceg tér (present-day Liberty Square). The statue of Maria Theresa, mounted among the four pillars of the monument, is today in the courtyard of Huniade Castle and was restored in 2014. The empress was "beheaded" in 1918 during Béla Kun's revolution, and the monument stayed like this in the square until 1936, when it was moved for political reasons to the Heroes' Cemetery.

The monument was designed by architect Josef Kranner, who, among other things, restored and enlarged the St. Vitus Cathedral within Prague's Hradčany. Also, the statues of the Fidelity Column were made by sculptor Josef Max, responsible for one of the statues that adorn the famous Charles Bridge in Prague.

In 2013, the then mayor Nicolae Robu proposed the relocation of the monument from the Heroes' Cemetery to Nicolae Bălcescu Square. The local branch of UDMR vehemently opposed the initiative, considering the monument offensive to the Hungarian community in the city. The initiative was eventually abandoned.
