= St. Catherine Obelisk =

- Obeliscul „Sf. Ecaterina”
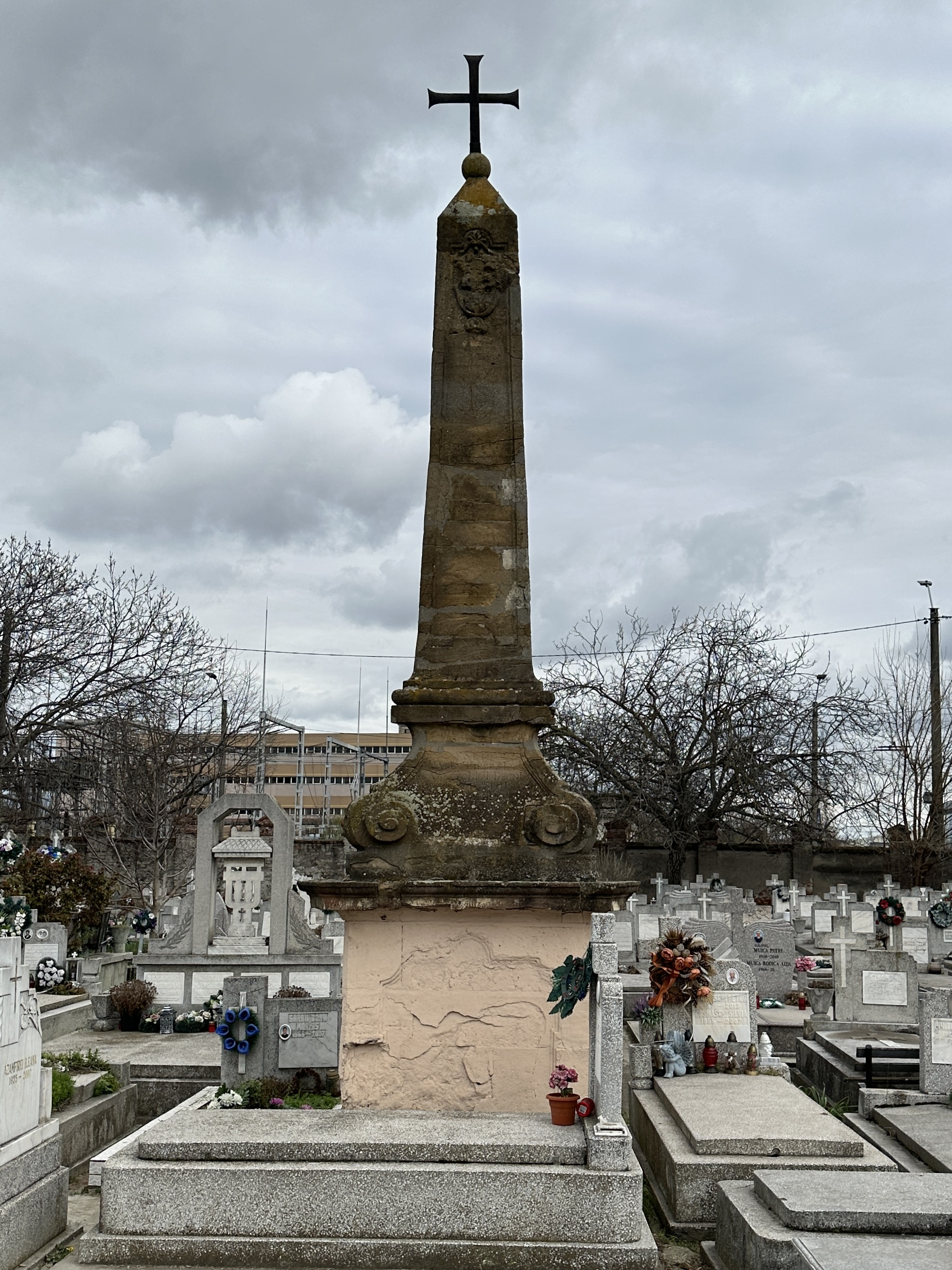
- Interactive map of St. Catherine Obelisk
- Location: Heroes' Cemetery, Timișoara, Romania
- Coordinates: 45°46′7″N 21°13′45″E
- Type: Obelisk
- Material: Sandstone
- Completion date: 1763
- Dedicated to: Catherine of Alexandria

The St. Catherine Obelisk is a monument in Timișoara, Romania. Erected in 1763 on the site of the altar of the old Franciscan church of Saint Catherine, the monument has been located since 1963 in the Heroes' Cemetery in the Lipovei district, although there were proposals to relocate it to Nicolae Bălcescu Square.

== History ==
The obelisk was erected in 1763 on the location of the altar of the former Gothic church dedicated to Saint Catherine.

The church is listed in the papal tithes from 1332 to 1337 within the diocese of Csanád. According to legend, Maria of Bytom, the wife of King Charles Robert, who was residing in Timișoara at the time, was buried in the crypt of the former church. However, she died in Timișoara and was ultimately interred in the royal crypt of the Székesfehérvár Basilica.

Under Ottoman rule, the church was converted into a mosque until 1716, when Timișoara was captured by the Habsburg Empire. Following the conquest, the building was repurposed as a salt warehouse and later as a powder magazine. In 1722, it was handed over to the Franciscan Order. However, in 1744, as the construction of the fortress expanded into the old Palanca Mică suburb, the authorities notified the Franciscans on 31 December 1744 that "within a year, the Catherine church and monastery would be demolished due to the ongoing fortress construction." By 1753, the complex had been completely demolished. It wasn't until 1752 that the Franciscans were granted a plot of land to build a new church. Between 1756 and 1774, they constructed a new Saint Catherine church, which is now located in the Cetate district, at 6 János Bolyai Street.

In 1763, a three-sided obelisk was erected on the site of the former church's altar, set upon a Baroque base. At the top of the obelisk is an iron cross, and the three sides of the base feature Latin inscriptions.

The obelisk was damaged during the siege of Timișoara in the Hungarian Revolution of 1848–1849 and was subsequently restored in 1851. It remained at its original location, in front of the Girls' School (now the Carmen Sylva National Pedagogical College), until the 1930s. In 1933, during the widening of Constantin Diaconovici Loga Boulevard, the obelisk was dismantled. By November 1938, it had been lying on the grass in front of Villa Szana for four years, although there had been multiple decisions to reassemble it. Following a petition from the Episcopal Ordinariate of Timișoara, restoration work on the monument began that year, with the task taken up by stone sculptor Karl Kendlhoffer. By June 1939, the obelisk was reported to have been restored and relocated a few meters towards the park, away from its original position.

In the 1960s, the obelisk was relocated to the cemetery on Calea Lipovei, where it still stands today. This move was reportedly prompted by the commencement of construction on Nicolae Ceaușescu's protocol villa in Timișoara, as the obelisk was situated on the land designated for the villa's construction.

== Description ==
The obelisk follows a classical design in its iconography and decoration, featuring a pyramidal shape with three sides. The base supports the upper part, which culminates in a pyramidion and crucifix. The middle section is adorned with prominently sculpted volutes framing Latin inscriptions that reference the time and purpose of the monument's construction. Decorative borders are visible on the base, and a cartouche embellishes one of the pyramid's faces at the top. The creator remains unknown, and there is no record identifying the donor.

The obelisk is highly degraded due to the brittle sandstone material from which it is constructed.

It features the following inscriptions:

Trophaeum solo aequatae sacrae aedis Chatarinensis, in qua sacrificare Deo florente Eugenio, Carolo sexto dominante Signo Reformatos Fratres coepisse Minores	Sed Maria Theresia apostolica Regni coronata Regina, hos in praesidio locat et patrocinio ambit	Defunctis, quorum hic Cineres ac ossa recondo, Aeternam requiem ore et corde precare viator
The monument of the levelled ground of the sacred building of the Church of Saint Catherine, in which to sacrifice to God flourishing under Emperor Eugene, during the reign of Charles the Sixth, the Reformed Brothers of the Minor Order began	But Maria Theresa, the apostolic Queen crowned of the Kingdom, places them under her protection and surrounds them with her patronage	To the deceased, whose ashes and bones I lay to rest here, may the traveler pray for eternal rest with mouth and heart
