= Park of National Awakening =

Park in Prague, Czech Republic

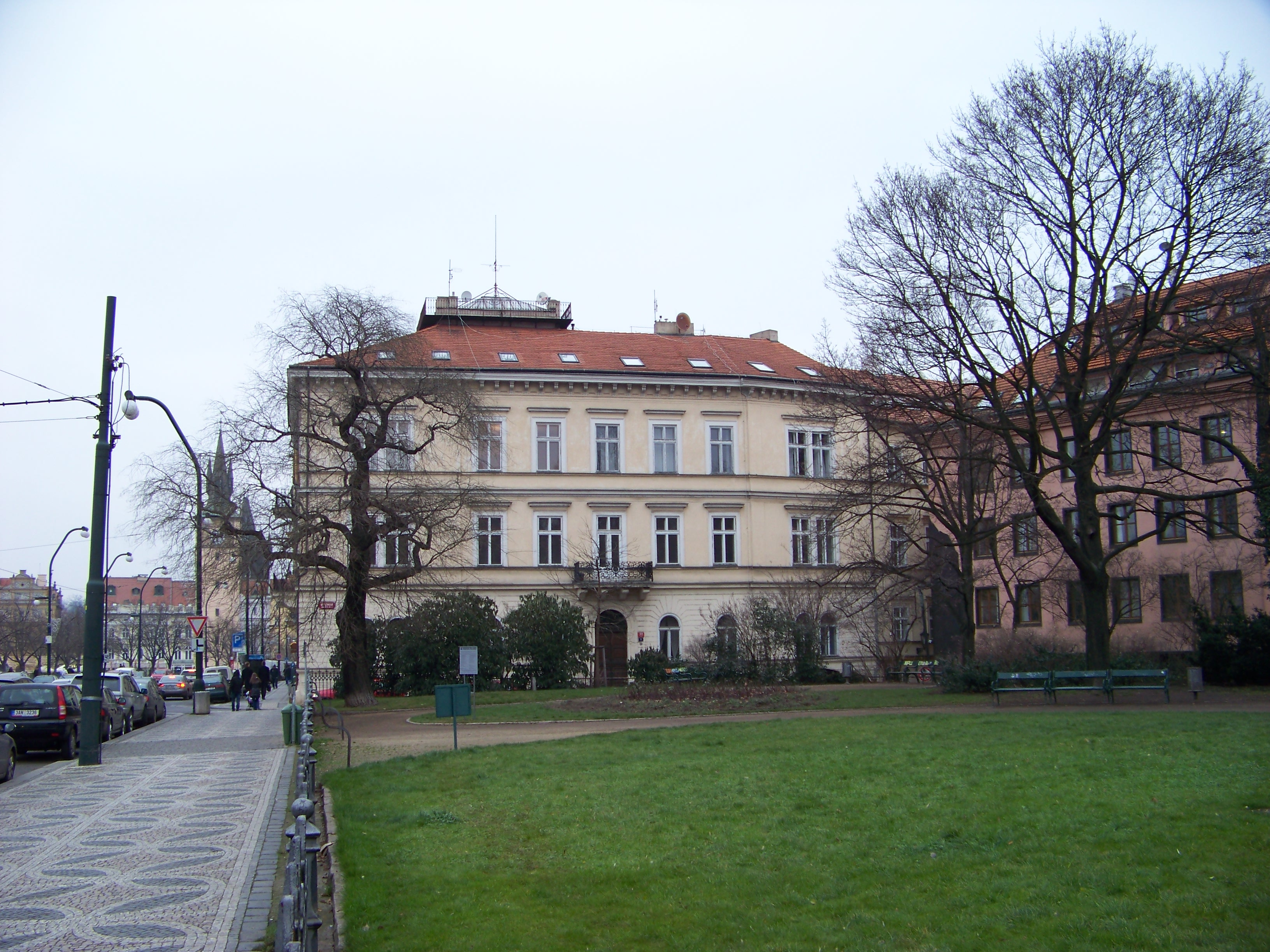
- The park in 2013
- Interactive map of Park of National Awakening
- Location: Prague, Czech Republic
- Coordinates: 50°4′59.13″N 14°24′48.82″E

The Park of National Awakening (Czech: Park Národního probuzení) is a park located in the Old Town, Prague, Czech Republic. One of its features is Kranner's Fountain.

In popular culture, the park is noted in Nicole Jarvis's 2021 novel The Lights of Prague.
