= Emanuel Max =

German-Czech sculptor

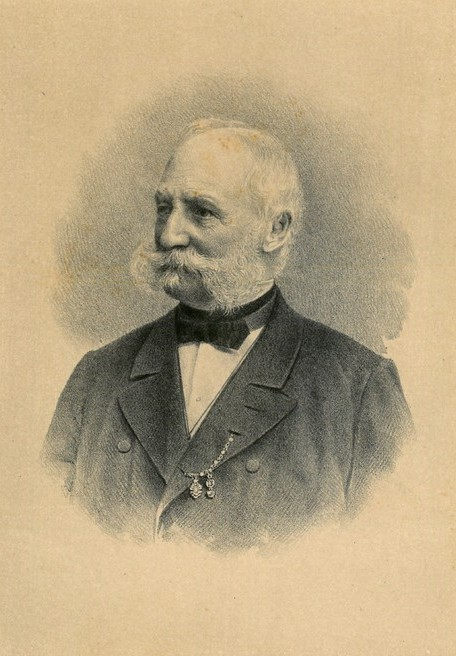
Emanuel Max

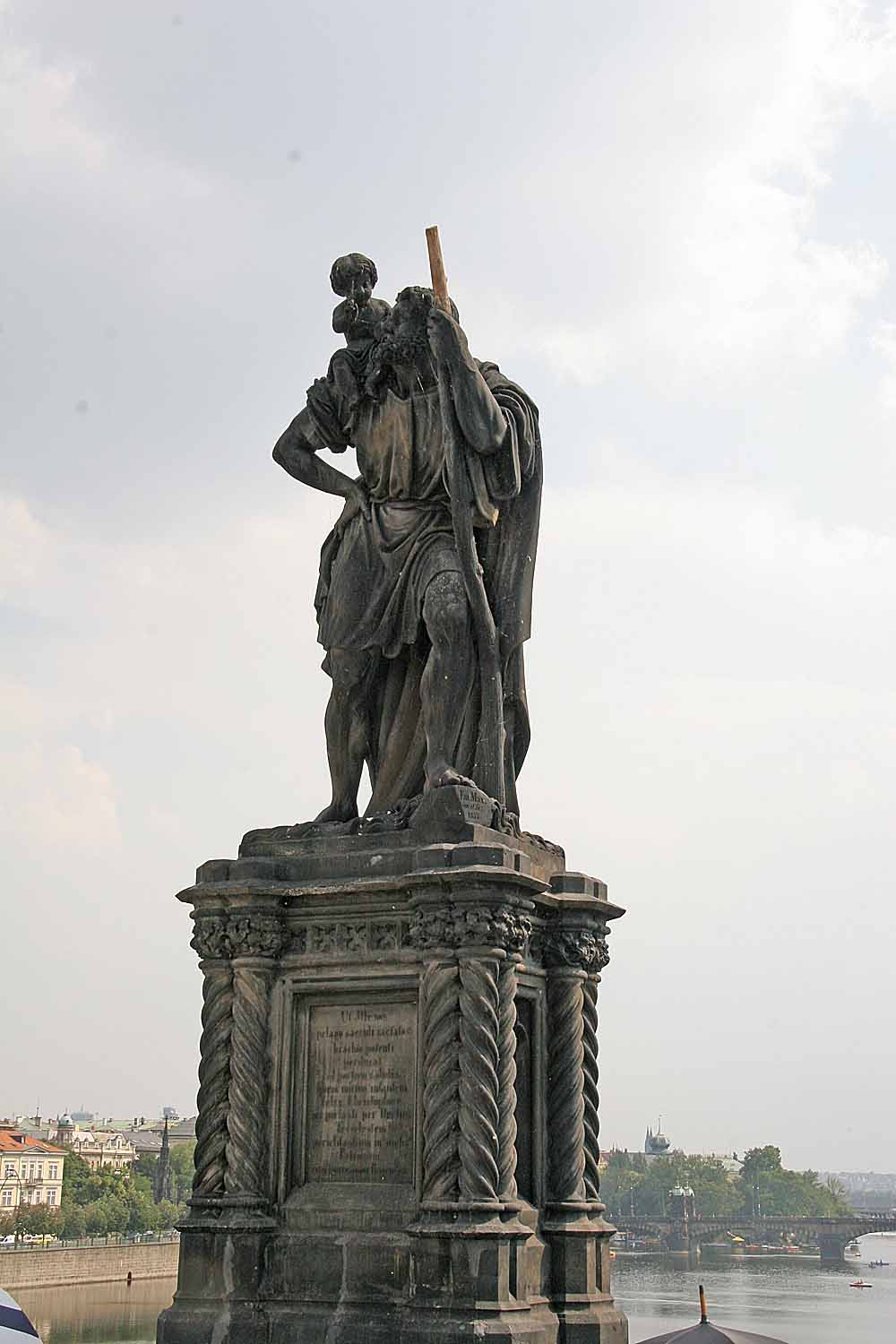
Statue of Saint Christopher, Charles Bridge

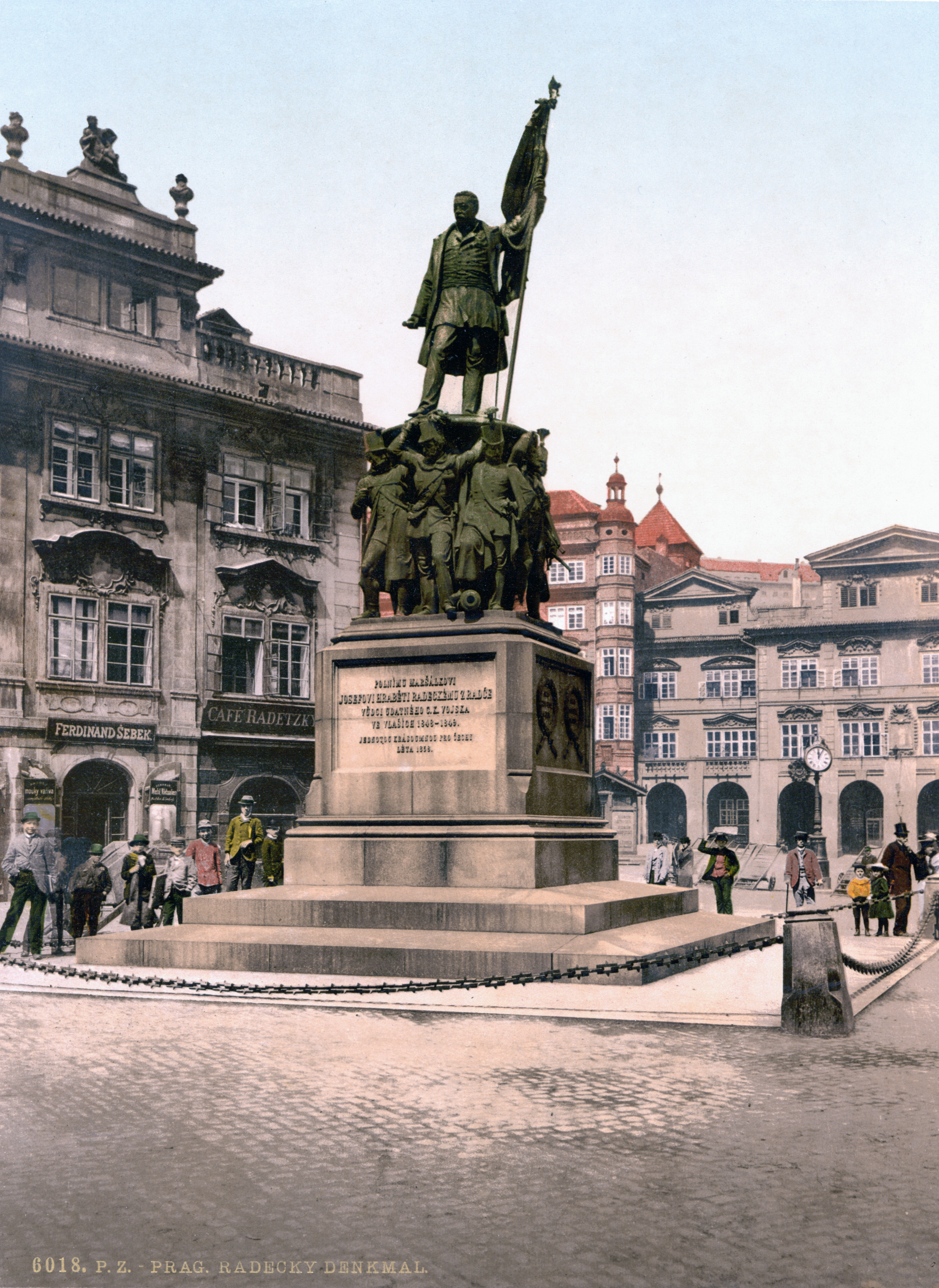
Radetzky Monument (c. 1900). It was taken down in 1919 and is currently on display in the National Museum

Emanuel Max, after 1876: Ritter von Wachstein (19 October 1810 – 22 February 1901) was a German-Czech sculptor. His brother was the sculptor Josef Max.

== Life ==
Max was born on 19 October 1810 in Janov, Bohemia, Austrian Empire (today part of Nový Bor, Czech Republic). He was born into a family of sculptors and woodcarvers and received his first lessons from his father. He later studied painting at the Academy of Fine Arts, Prague, under Joseph Bergler and František Kristian Waldherr. The academy did not have a sculpture department at that time, so he also studied at the Vienna Academy of Fine Arts with Johann Nepomuk Schaller and Franz Käßmann (1760–1833).

From 1839 to 1849, he lived in Italy, where he improved his knowledge of the old masters and came under the influence of newer masters, such as Antonio Canova and Bertel Thorvaldsen. He also honed his technical skills by carving Carrara marble. When he returned to Prague, he opened his own successful sculpting workshop and got married.

He was named a Knight of the Order of Franz Joseph in 1858 and a member of the Order of the Iron Crown (Class III) in 1875. The following year, he was knighted by Emperor Franz Joseph and given the noble appellation "von Wachstein".

He died on 22 February 1901 in Prague.

== Selected works ==
- Statue of Saint Adalbert praying for rain, which won him a fellowship to study in Italy from the Klar Foundation.
- Monument to Marshal Joseph Radetzky von Radetz, done with the assistance of his brother Josef, from sketches by Christian Ruben.
- Portrait busts of Mozart, Julius Vincenz von Krombholz and Alois Klar.
- Memorial for Karl Egon II in Křivoklát Castle
- Monument to Karl Philipp, Prince of Schwarzenberg at Krásný Dvůr Castle
- Statue of the Archangel Raphael for the chapel at the Institute for the Blind, now in the National Museum.
- Statues of Henri, Duke of Rohan and Godfrey of Bouillon for Sychrov Castle
- Sculptures on the Charles Bridge. (Pièta; Francis of Assisi as Saint Francis Seraphicus, accompanied by angels; Saint Christopher with the Infant Jesus; Calvary)
