= St. Catherine Church, Timișoara =

Catholic church in Cetate, Timișoara, Romania

St. Catherine Church
- Biserica Sf. Ecaterina (Romanian); Kostol sv. Kataríny (Slovak)
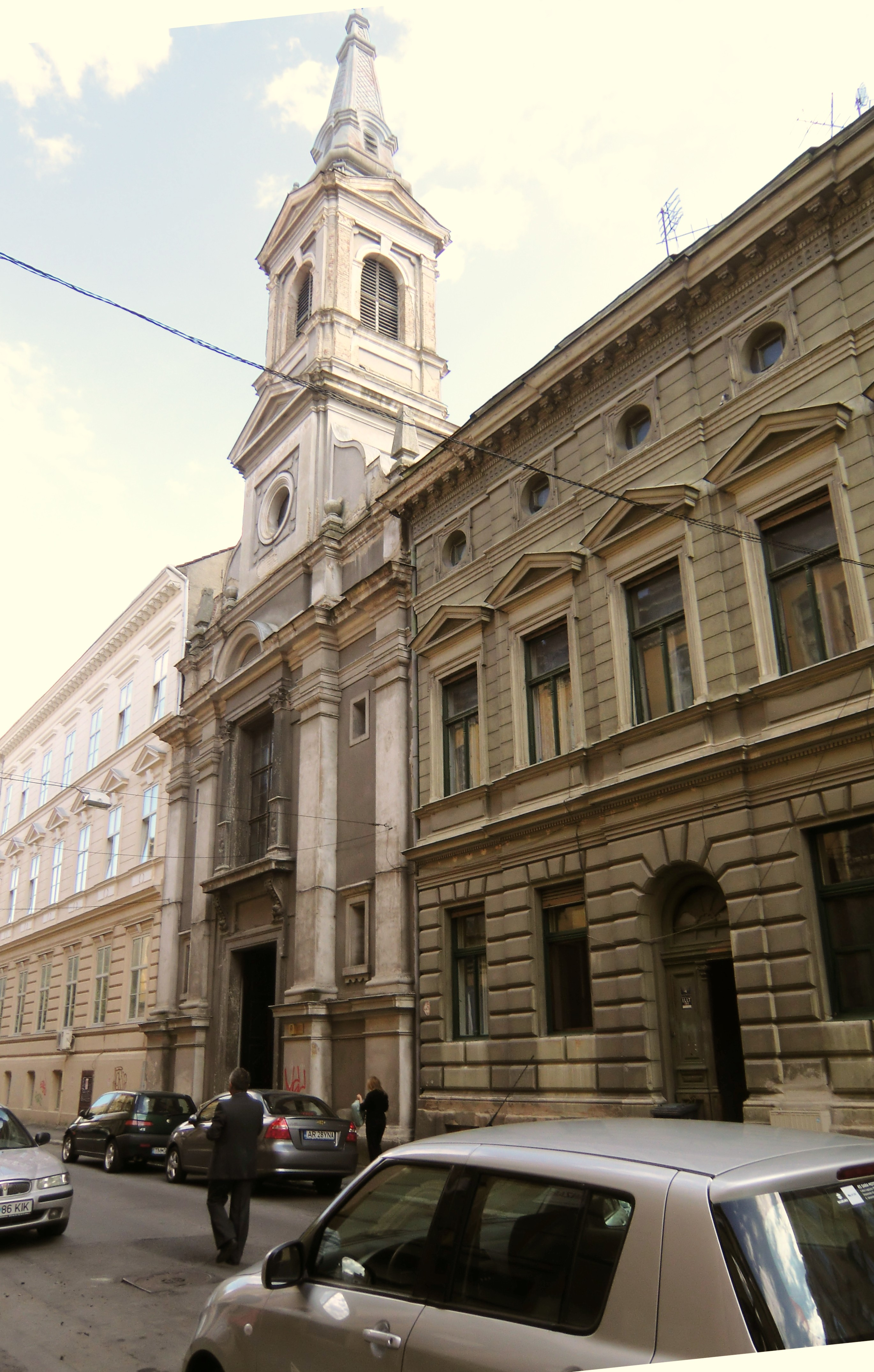

Religion
- Affiliation: Roman Catholic
- Patron: Catherine of Alexandria
- Year consecrated: 1889
- Status: Active

Location
- Location: 4 János Bolyai Street, Timișoara
- Interactive map of St. Catherine Church
- Coordinates: 45°45′15″N 21°13′41″E

Architecture
- Architect: Camillo Sitte
- Style: Neoclassical
- Groundbreaking: 1887
- Completed: 1889

St. Catherine Church (Romanian: Biserica Sf. Ecaterina; Slovak: Kostol sv. Kataríny) is a Roman Catholic church on János Bolyai Street in the Cetate district of Timișoara. The church currently serves the Slovak Catholic community in Timișoara.

== History ==
The original St. Catherine Church, one of the oldest churches in the city, was built during the reign of the Hungarian King Charles Robert, who had temporarily moved his seat of government to what was then Temesvár. His wife Maria of Bytom died in Timișoara in 1317, also referred to in the literature as Maria Ecaterina or Maria Katharina, who is said to have been buried in the church afterwards; other sources date the day of death to 15 December 1315 and name the Basilica of Székesfehérvár as the place of burial. The church was then located near today's Carmen Sylva National Pedagogical College. It was converted into a mosque during the Ottoman occupation.

After Timișoara was liberated by Prince Eugene of Savoy in 1716, the building was first used as a salt depot and later as a gunpowder magazine. In 1722 it came into the possession of the Reformed Franciscans of the Salvatorian Order (Patres Ordinis Minores Reformatorum S.P. Francisci Provinciae Hungariae S.S. Salvatoris), who maintained a monastery nearby, and could thus once again serve its original purpose as a church. The Franciscan church ad Sanctam Catharinam offered asylum seekers a place of refuge.

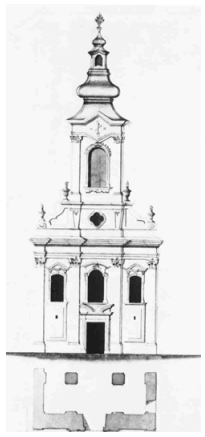
Church plan after Johann Lechner

In the course of the reconstruction of the fortress, the church was demolished in 1723 and a triangular obelisk made of sandstone with an iron cross on top was erected in its place in 1763 to commemorate the personalities buried here. Severely damaged during the siege of 1849, the obelisk was restored in 1851 and moved to the Heroes' Cemetery in Calea Lipovei in 1963, where it can still be seen today.

Between 1753 and 1756 the new St. Catherine Church was built on the site of a former mill, on today's János Bolyai Street; master builder was Johann Lechner. The building, like most in the area, due to the marshy terrain, was built on oak pillars. But due to drainage and fortification works, the groundwater kept coming down. The pillars in contact with the air have deteriorated sharply, weakening the whole ensemble. The earthquake of 1882 caused irreparable damage to the church. The tower fell inwards, large pieces reaching as far as the crypt in the cellar. The municipality, as the owner, considered that the renovation of the place would be too expensive and decided to dismantle everything and build a new church. The construction of the new church began in 1887, and on 25 November 1889 it was inaugurated by Pastor Josef Brand.

== Architecture ==
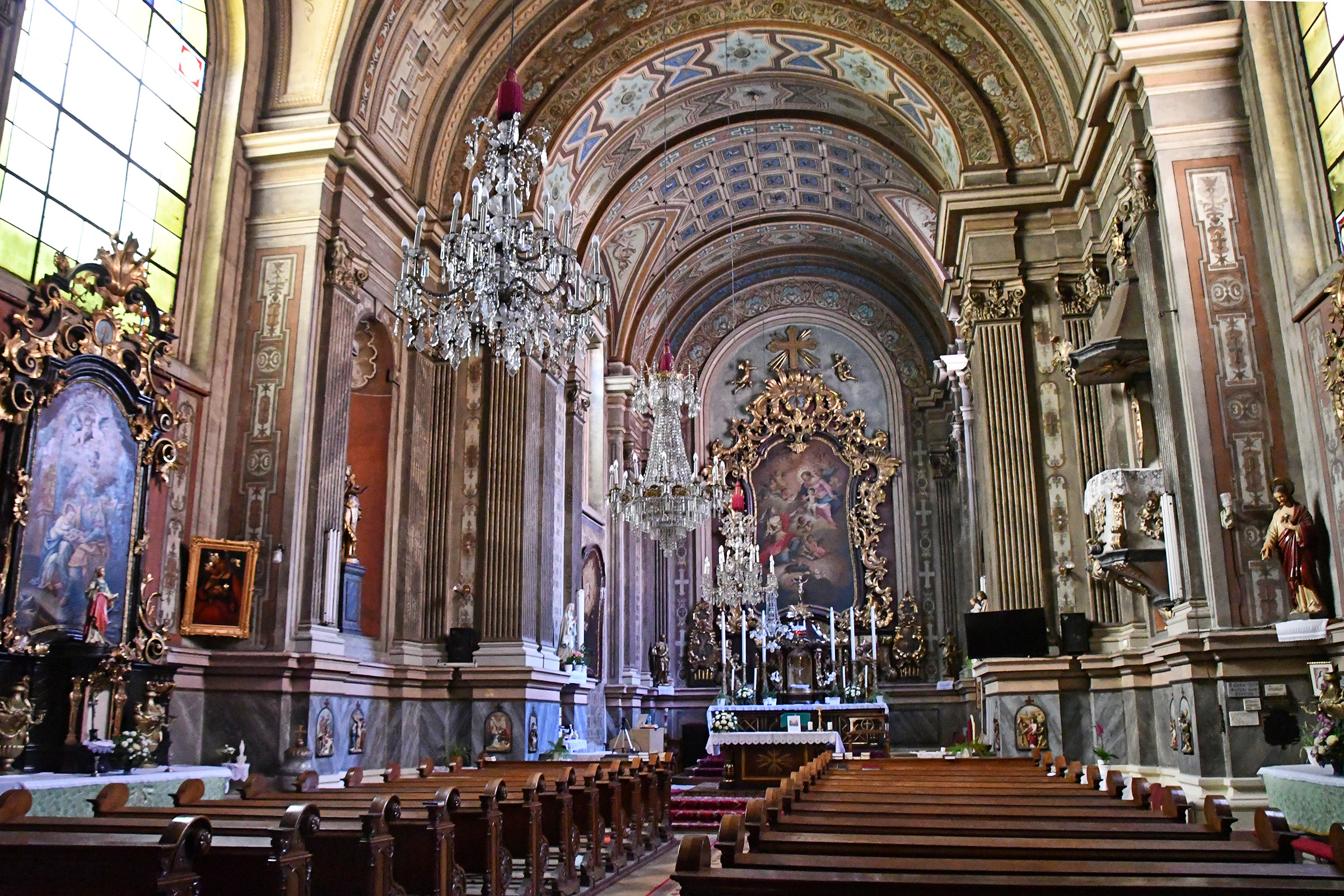
The interior of the church

The current church was completely rebuilt at the end of the 19th century, according to the plans of the architect Camillo Sitte, the period from which the current tower dates. The building has been adapted to the neoclassical style, but also retains many baroque elements of the old church. The arch in the center, as well as the Corinthian pilasters on the first floor are typical elements of the neoclassical style. Despite all the subsequent transformations, the main altar preserves the original painting from 1761, made by the Viennese painter Ferdinand Schiessl. The pulpit and the furniture of the sacristy come from the old church, demolished in 1723. It is believed that the Black Madonna, a figure of Mary and Child carved from black wood and decorated with rich gold brocade, also dates from this period.
