= Josef Max =

German-Czech sculptor

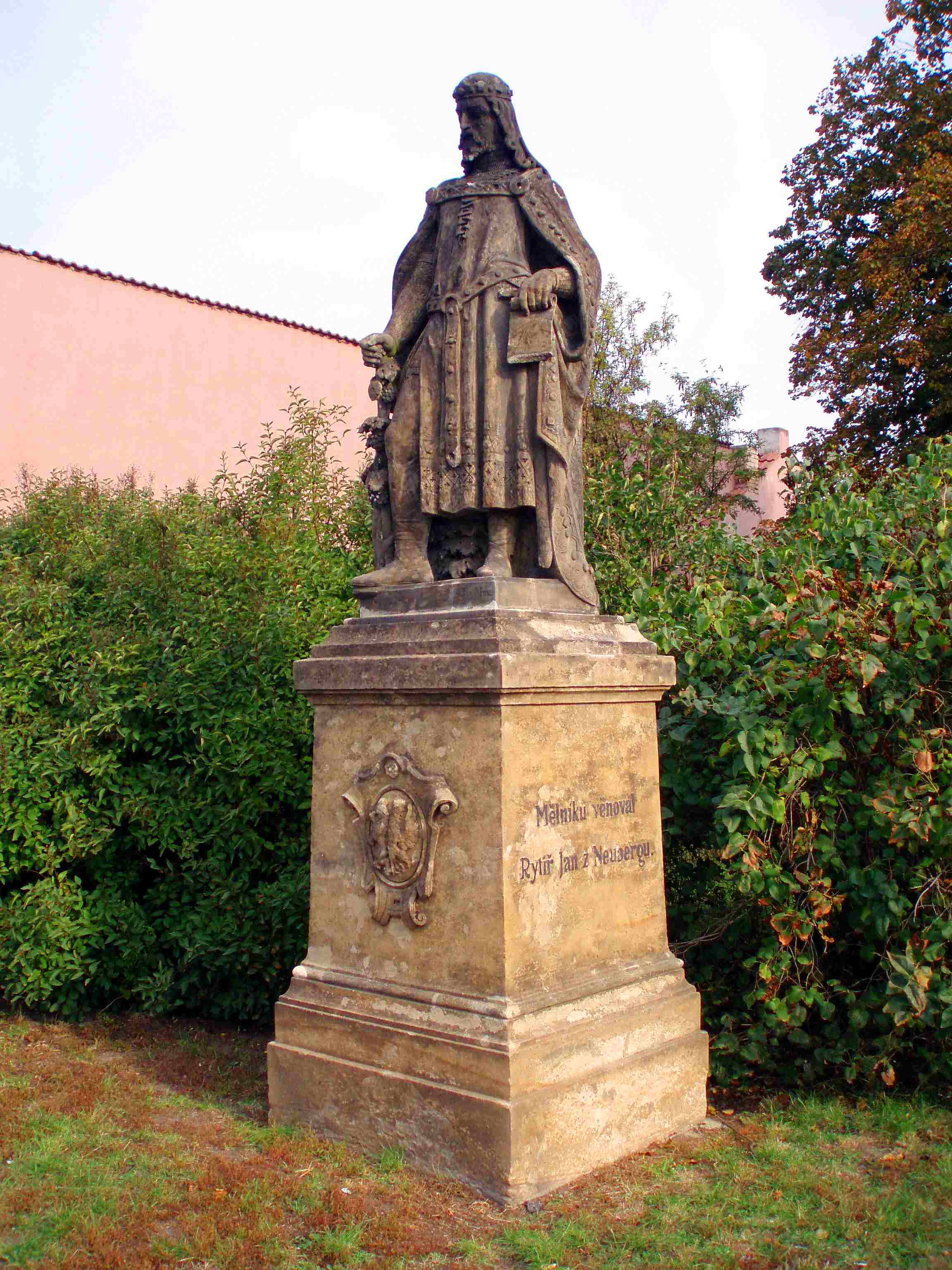
Monument to Charles IV in Mělník

Josef Calanza Max (16 January 1804 – 18 June 1855) was a German-Czech sculptor. His brother was the sculptor Emanuel Max.

== Life ==
Max was born on 16 January 1804 in Janov, Bohemia, Austrian Empire (today part of Nový Bor, Czech Republic). He came from a family of sculptors and woodcarvers and received his first lessons from his father. In 1822, encouraged by letters from one of his father's former students, he moved to Prague, where he found employment in a woodcarving workshop. From 1823 to 1824, he studied at the Academy of Fine Arts under Joseph Bergler. He continued working for the woodcarving shop and married the owner's daughter, Anna Maria Schuhmann, in 1834. They had seven children, including the painter Gabriel Max and the photographer/painter Jindřich Břetislav Max (1847–1900). He began to exhibit as early as 1826, but received little recognition except for an award from the Academy for his statue of Germanicus. He applied for a position in the sculpture studios of Václav Prachner, but was rejected.

In 1830, he opened his own studios. His first major contract was for a series of tombstones in Chrastava, which was obtained through the influence of a friend from the Academy, Joseph von Führich. Another important client was Prince Rudolf Kinský and his wife Vilhelmína. During the 1840s and 50s, he joined with his brother Emanuel to create several important monuments. He often collaborated with the architect Josef Kranner, most notably executing the figures on the monumental fountain dedicated to Francis I, from designs by Kranner.

He died of cholera on 18 June 1855 in Prague, at the age of 51.

== Selected works ==
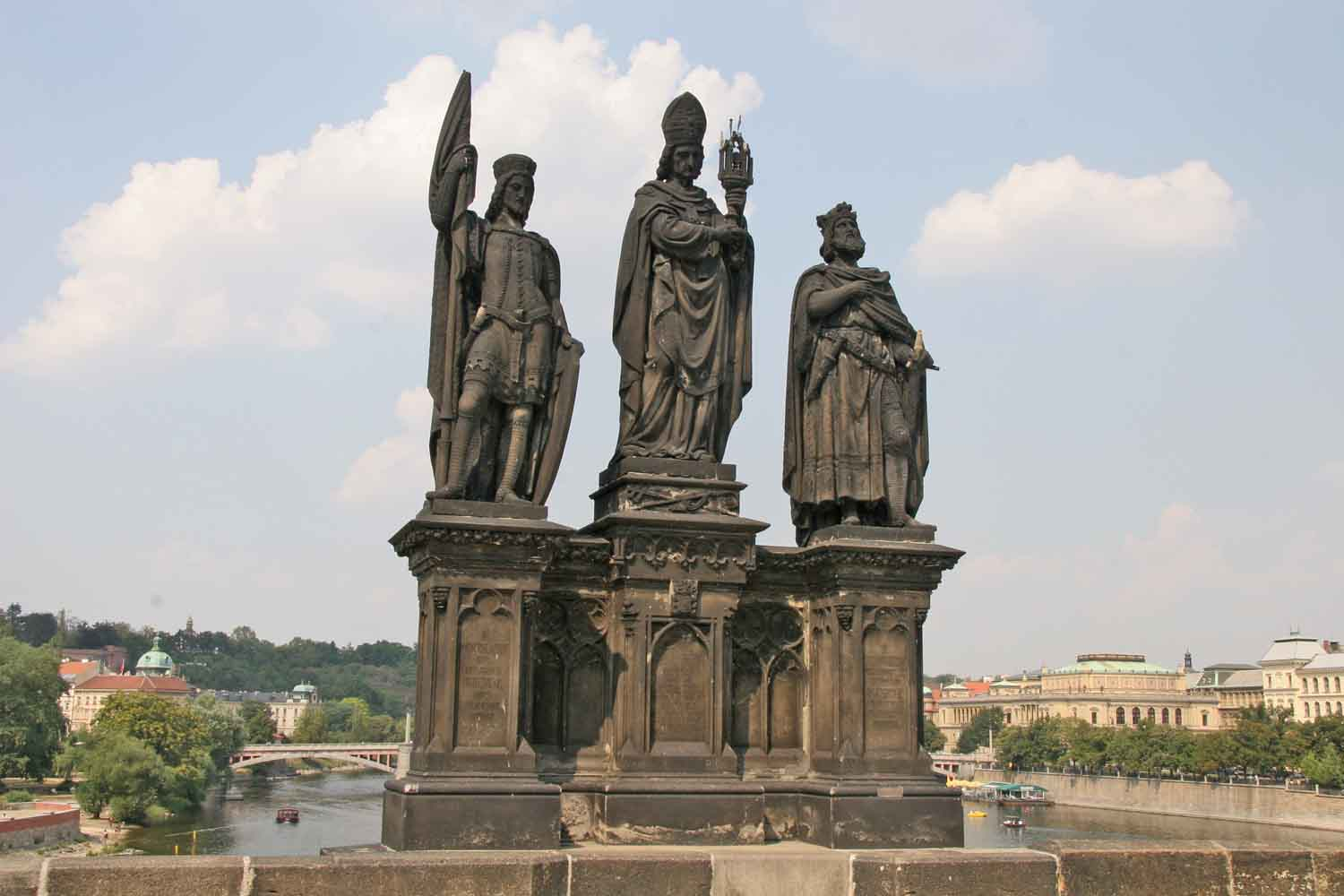
Statues of Saints Norbert, Wenceslaus and Sigismund, Charles Bridge

- Tomb for Joseph Bergler, depicting the resurrection of Lazarus, in the Malostranský Cemetery, Prague
- Figures for the tomb of Prince Rudolf Kinsky in Zlonice
- Tomb of Joseph Max, senior, at the cemetery in Sloup v Čechách
- Monuments to Charles IV, Holy Roman Emperor, in Mělník and Karlovy Vary
- Monument to Přemysl the Ploughman in Královské pole, donated by the Nostitz family
- Six sculptures of Czech rulers for the new wing of the Old Town Hall. The figures of Ferdinand I and Francis I were seriously damaged during World War II and are in the Municipal Museum. The other four (Spytihněv I, Ottakar II, Charles IV and Ferdinand III) were transferred to the new building of the Research Institute for Rheumatic Diseases in the 1980s.
- Parts of the Radetzky Monument in Prague (together with his brother Emanuel).
- Sculptures on the Charles Bridge. (Statues of Saints Norbert, Wenceslaus and Sigismund; John the Baptist; Saint Joseph with Jesus)
- Kranner's Fountain
