= Joseph Bergler the Elder =

Austrian sculptor

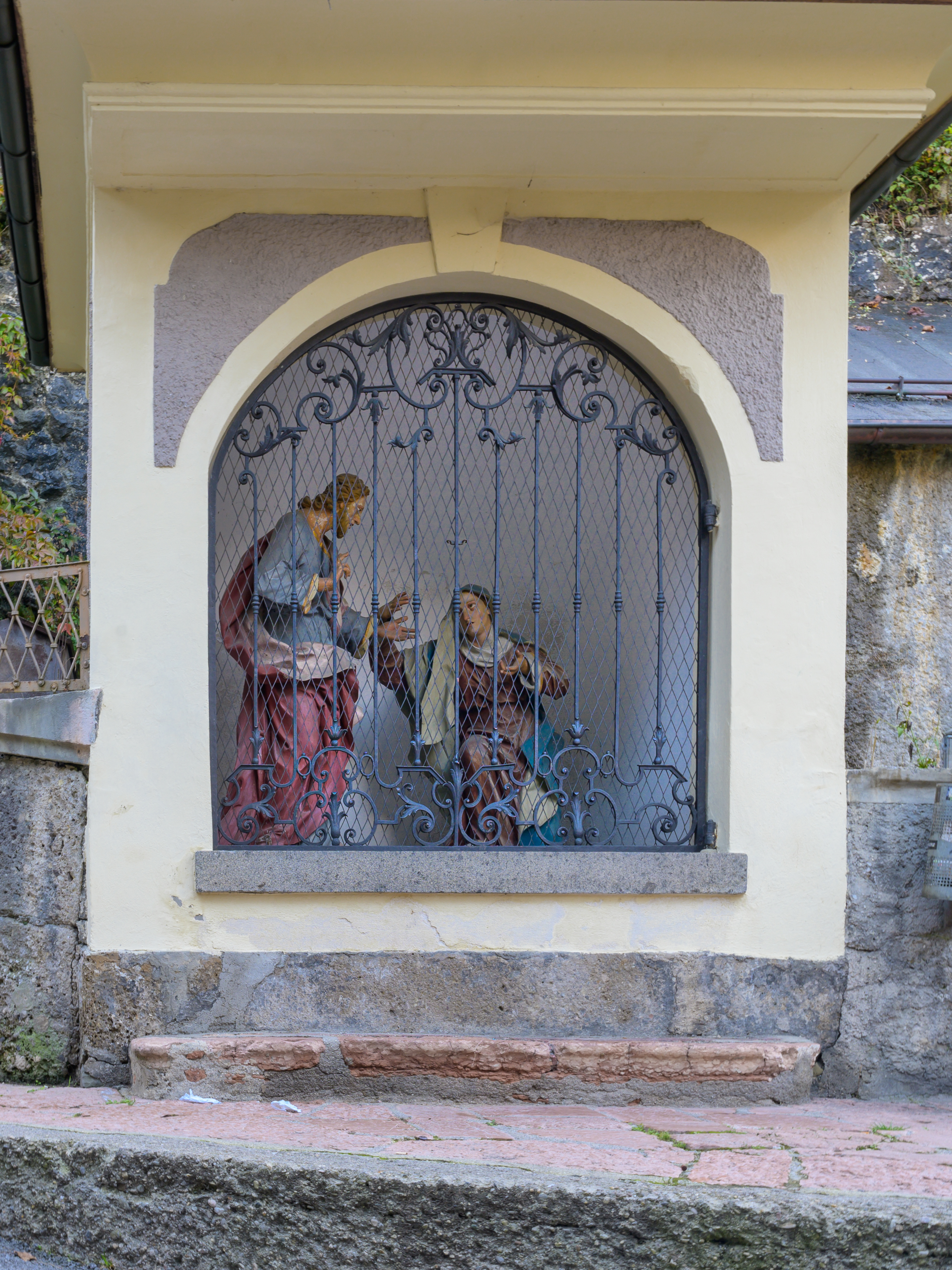
Salzburg Kapuzinerberg

Joseph Bergler the Elder (1718–1788) was an Austrian sculptor of the Baroque era.

== Life ==
Bergler was born in 1718, either in Windischgarsten or in Matrei in Osttirol. His father, Johann Georg Bergler, was also a sculptor and arranged for him to receive a sculpture education by Lorenz Hörmbler in Passau in Lower Bavaria. Joseph Bergler was the father of painter Joseph Bergler the Younger (1753–1829).

Bergler died in Passau in 1788.

== Work ==
Bergler was a representative of Baroque sculpture. The Kapuzinerberg is a hill on the eastern bank of the Salzach river in the city of Salzburg in Austria, and the site of a Capuchin cloister built in 1599–1605 on the site of a medieval fortress. On the way of the Linzergasse to the monastery stand 13 oratories with the way of the cross, which were built up between 1736 and 1744, by Bergler as well as Lorenz Hörmbler.

Bergler often devoted himself to creating altarpieces, especially for churches in Bavaria. A notable work of Bergler is The Sacrifice of Abraham, a 62 cm high statue created in 1753. It is exhibited in Gartenpalais Liechtenstein in Vienna.
