= Statue of Francis of Assisi, Charles Bridge =

Statue in Prague, Czech Republic

Statue of Francis of Assisi
- Sousoší svatého Františka Serafinského (Czech)
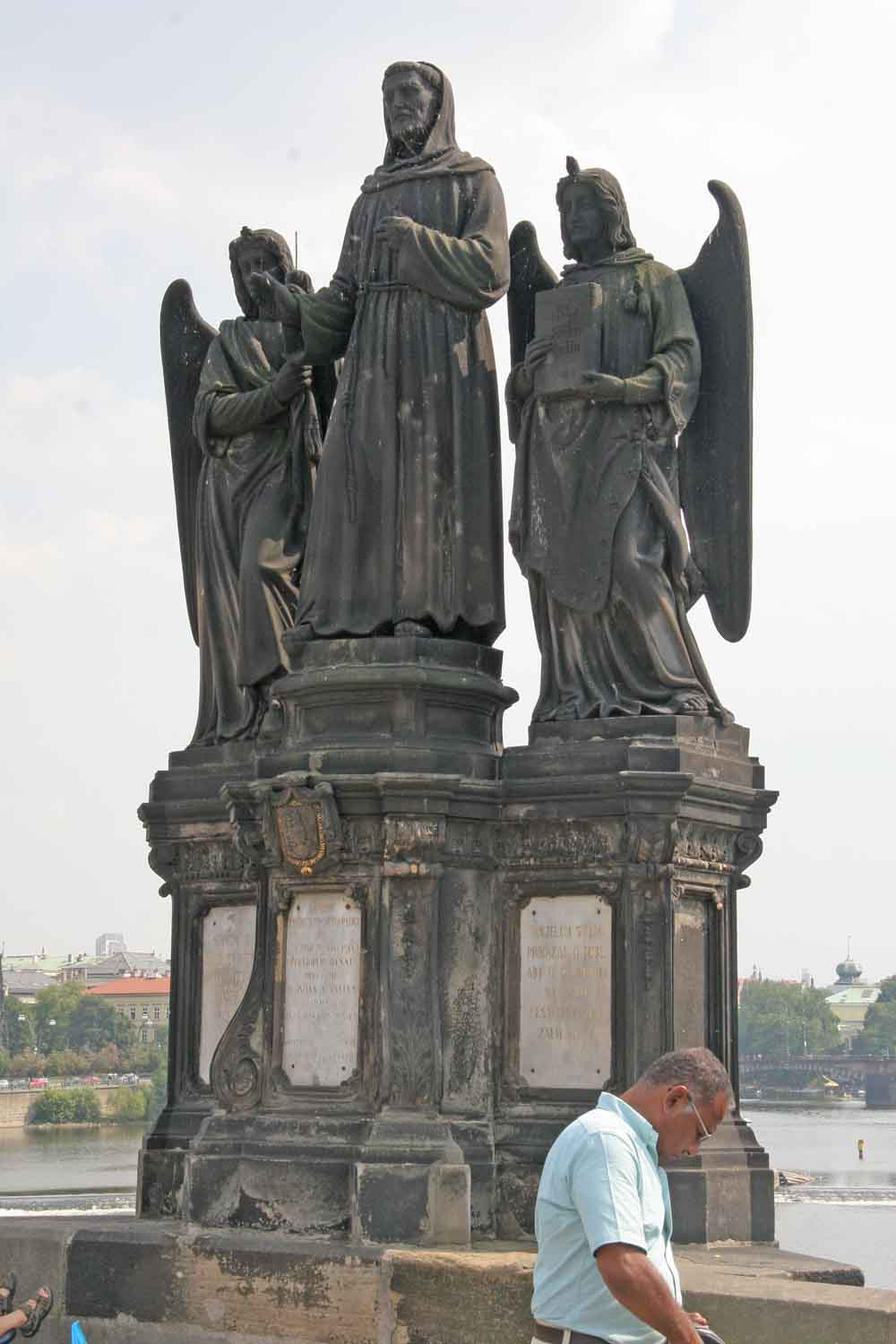
- The statue in 2006
- Artist: Emanuel Max
- Type: Sculpture
- Subject: Francis of Assisi
- Location: Prague, Czech Republic; 50°05′12″N 14°24′35″E

A statue of Francis of Assisi (Czech: Sousoší svatého Františka Serafinského) by Emanuel Max is installed on the south side of the Charles Bridge in Prague, Czech Republic.

== History ==
The statue was consctructed to commemorate Austrian Emperor Franz Joseph's survival of an assassination attempt in 1853. It was donated by Austrian Minister-President Count Franz Anton von Kolowrat-Liebsteinsky
