= Statues of Saints Norbert, Wenceslaus and Sigismund =

Statues in Prague, Czech Republic

Coordinates: 50°05′12″N 14°24′38″E

- Sousoší svatého Norberta, Václava a Zikmunda (Czech)
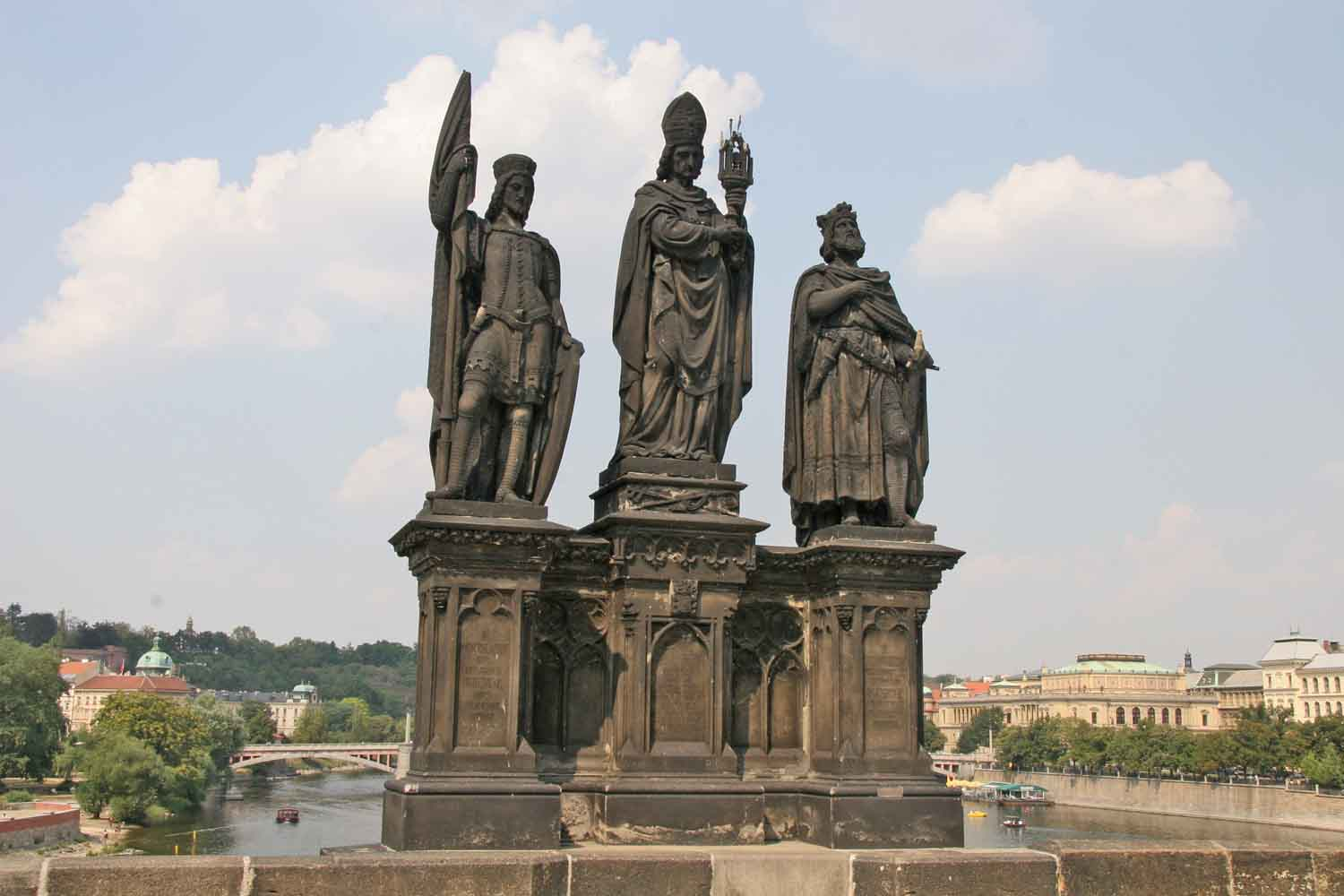
- The statues, 2006
- Artist: Josef Max
- Subject: Norbert of Xanten; Wenceslaus I, Duke of Bohemia; Sigismund of Burgundy
- Location: Prague, Czech Republic

The statues of Saints Norbert, Wenceslaus and Sigismund (Czech: Sousoší svatého Norberta, Václava a Zikmunda) are installed on the north side of the Charles Bridge in Prague, Czech Republic.

These sandstone sculptures feature the Saint Sigismund I of Burgundy (left), Norbert of Xanten (middle), and Saint Wenceslaus of Bohemia (right). They have been created by Josef Max and commissioned by the patron Jeronym Zeidler of the Strahov Monastery.

== Inscriptions ==
The inscriptions beneath them read the following:

"St. Sigismund, martyr, king of Burgundy, patron of Bohemia and eternal warrior of the Kingdom of Christ."

"In memory of St. Norbert, a holy patriarch and canon of the Order of Premonstratensians and a patron of the Kingdom of Bohemia, in the year 1853, placed for the third time, with the statues of the venerable kings St. Wenceslas and St. Sigismund, under auspices of Jeroným Zeidler, abbot of Strahov."

"St. Wenceslas, martyr, prince and patron of Bohemia. The grace and consolation of the land."

These statues are among 30 baroque statues of saints and patron saints that were prominent around the years between 1683 and 1714 along the Charles Bridge.
