= Statue of John the Baptist, Charles Bridge =

Statue in Prague, Czech Republic

Statue of John the Baptist
- Socha svatého Jana Křtitele (Czech)
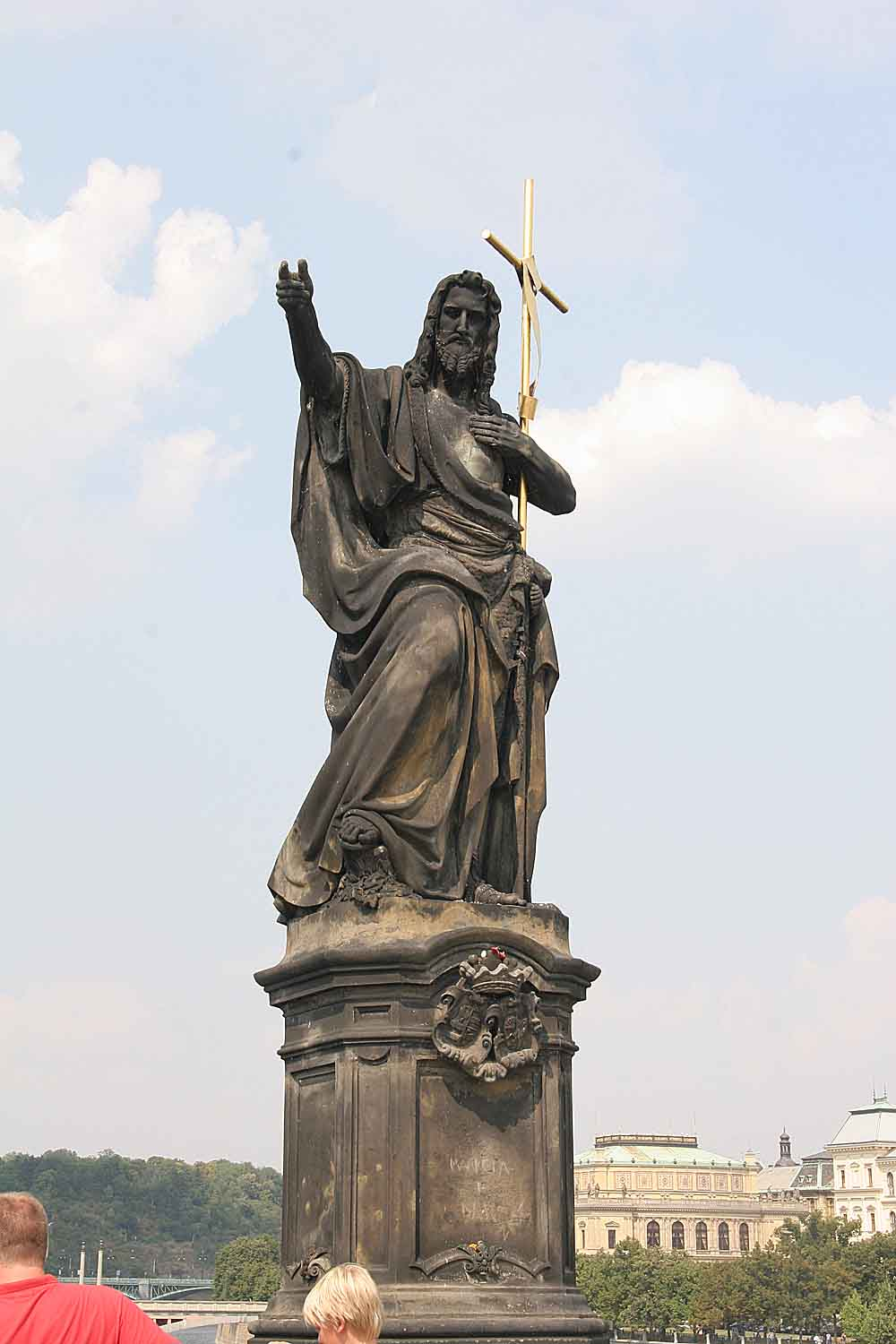
- The statue in 2006
- Artist: Josef Max
- Type: Sculpture
- Subject: John the Baptist
- Location: Prague, Czech Republic; 50°5′11.65″N 14°24′39.9″E

The statue of John the Baptist (Czech: Socha svatého Jana Křtitele) is an outdoor sculpture by Josef Max, installed on the north side of the Charles Bridge in Prague, Czech Republic.
