= Statue of Saint Joseph, Charles Bridge =

Statue in Prague, Czech Republic

Statue of Saint Joseph
- Socha svatého Josefa (Czech)
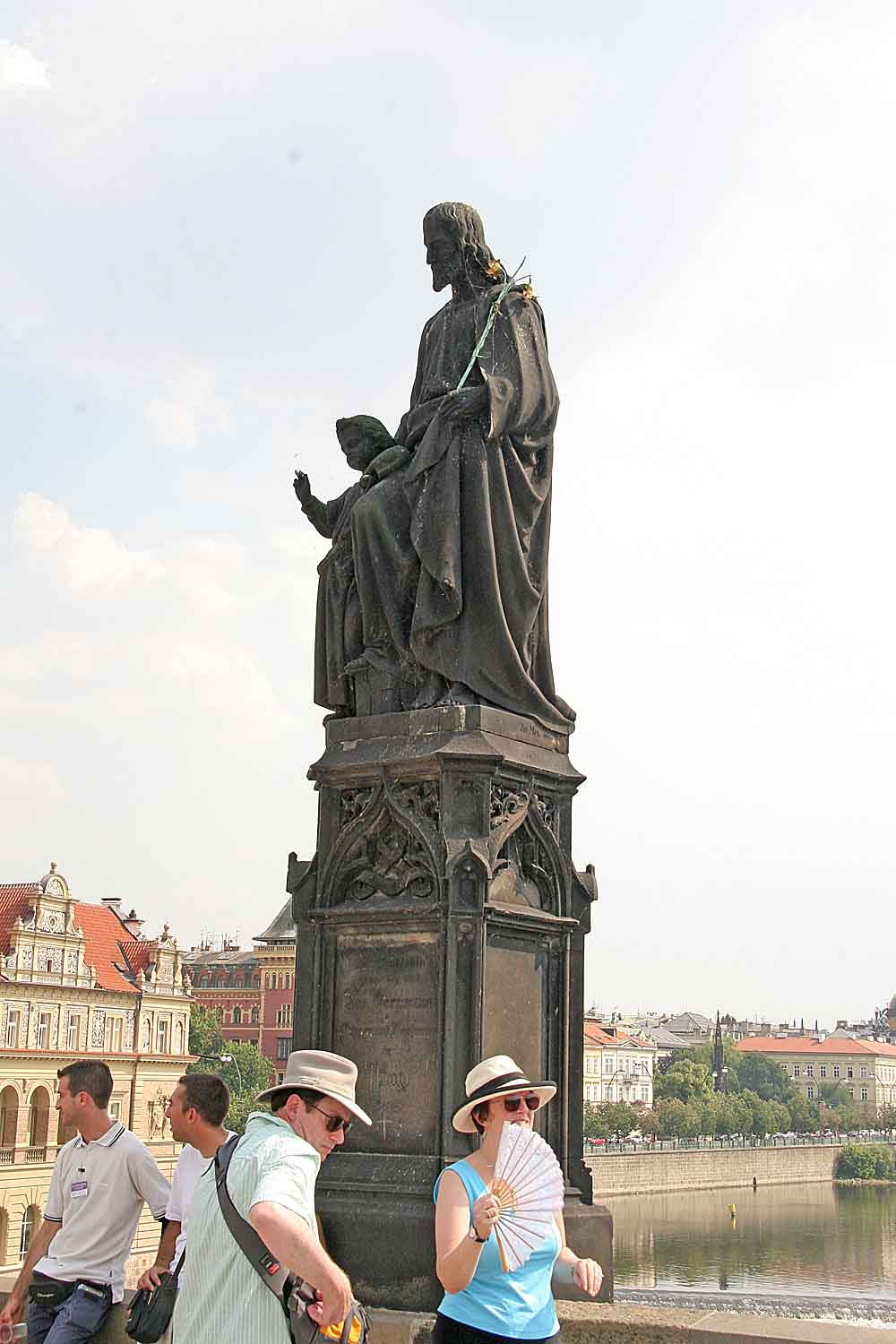
- The statue in 2006
- Artist: Josef Max
- Subject: Saint Joseph
- Location: Prague, Czech Republic; 50°05′11″N 14°24′43″E

The statue of Saint Joseph (Czech: Socha svatého Josefa) with a young Jesus is an outdoor sculpture designed by Josef Max, installed on the south side of the Charles Bridge in Prague, Czech Republic.
