= Statue of Saint Christopher, Charles Bridge =

Statue in Prague, Czech Republic

Statue of Saint Christopher
- Socha svatého Kryštofa (Czech)
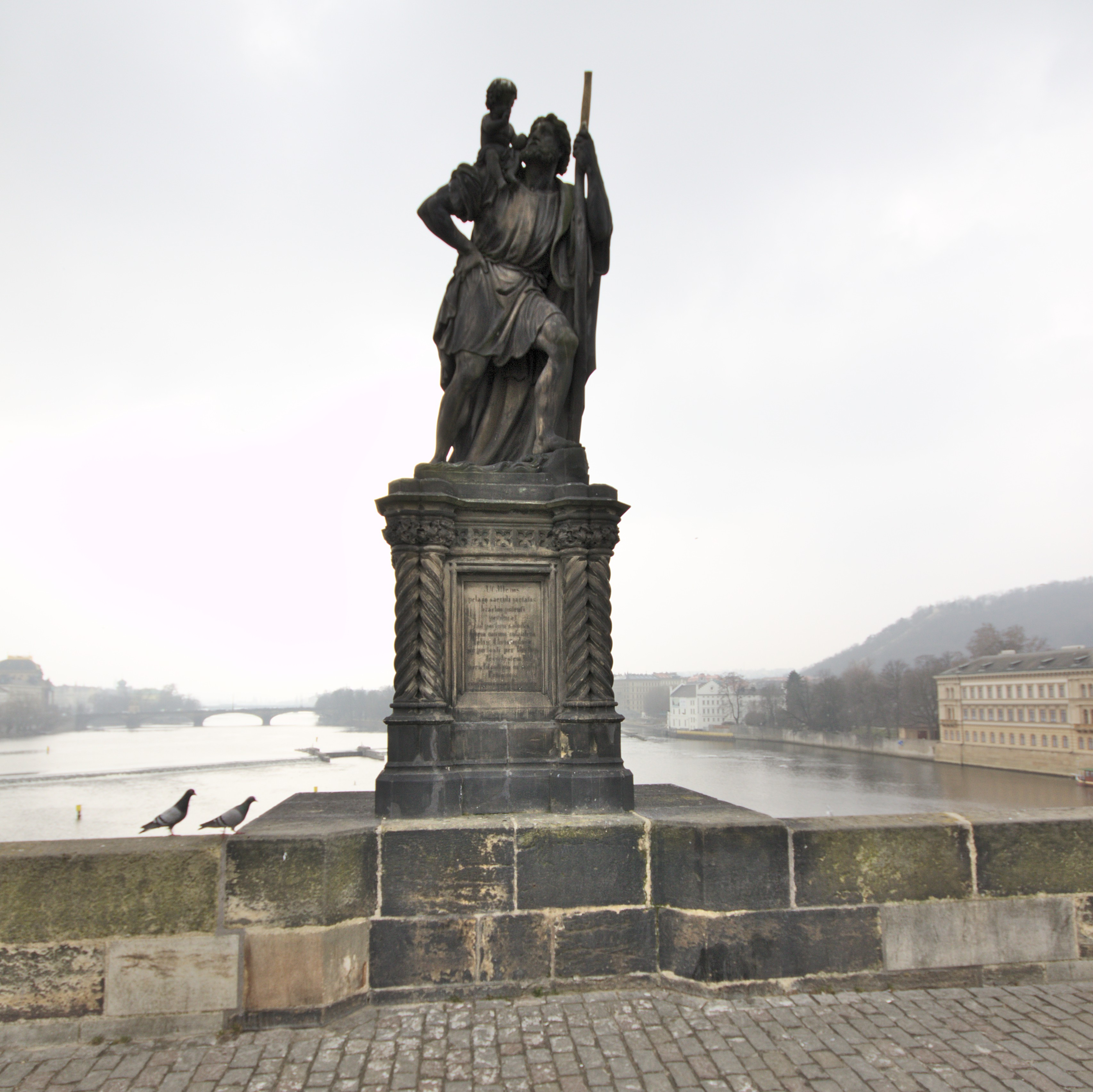
- The statue, 2014
- Artist: Emanuel Max
- Subject: Saint Christopher
- Location: Prague, Czech Republic; 50°05′11″N 14°24′40″E

The statue of Saint Christopher (Czech: Socha svatého Kryštofa) is an outdoor sculpture by Emanuel Max, installed on the south side of the Charles Bridge in Prague, Czech Republic.
