= Royal field with the monument to Přemysl the Ploughman =

Czech national cultural monument

Coordinates: 50°36′51″N 13°57′47″E

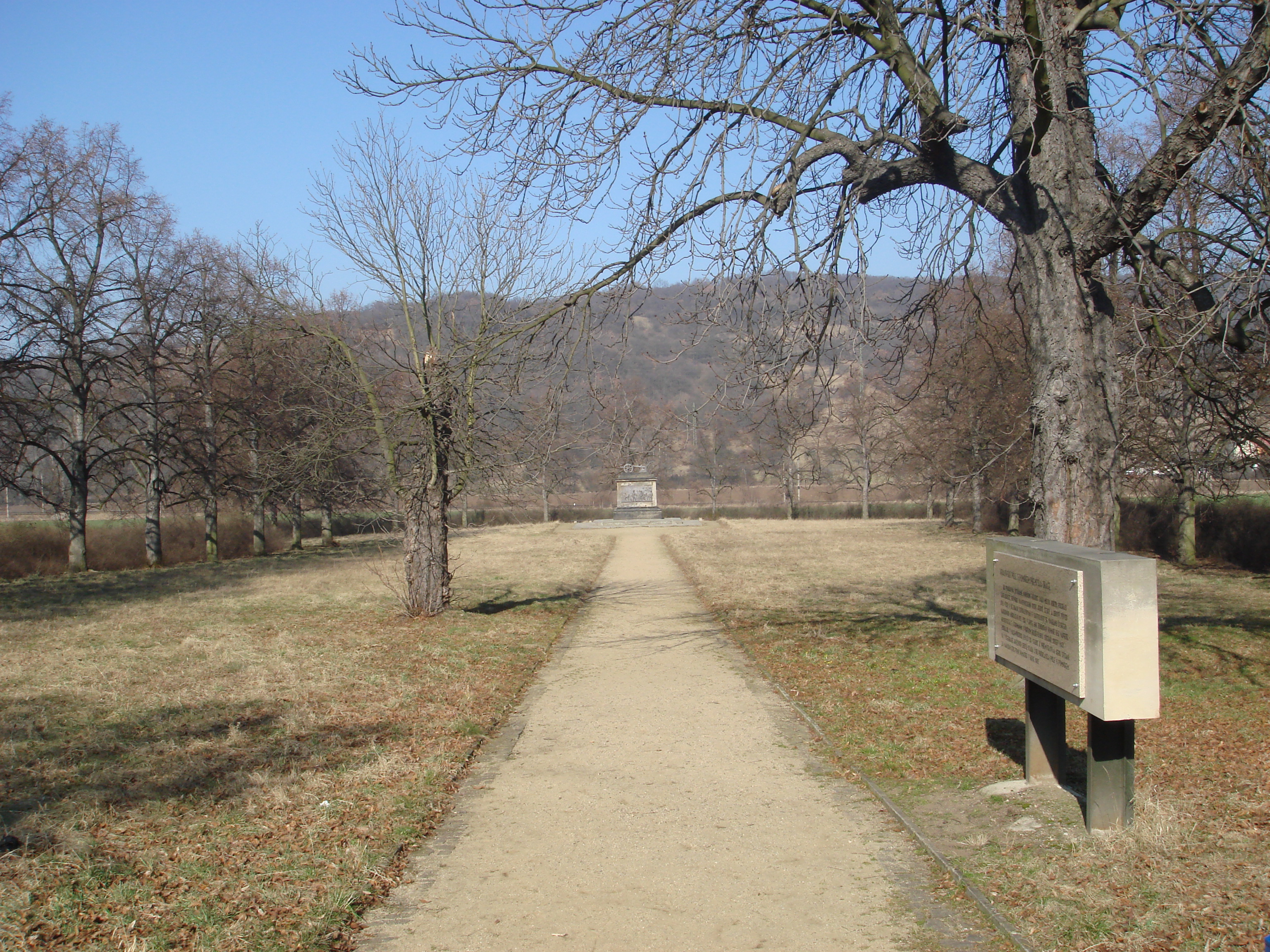
Royal field with monument to Přemysl the Ploughman

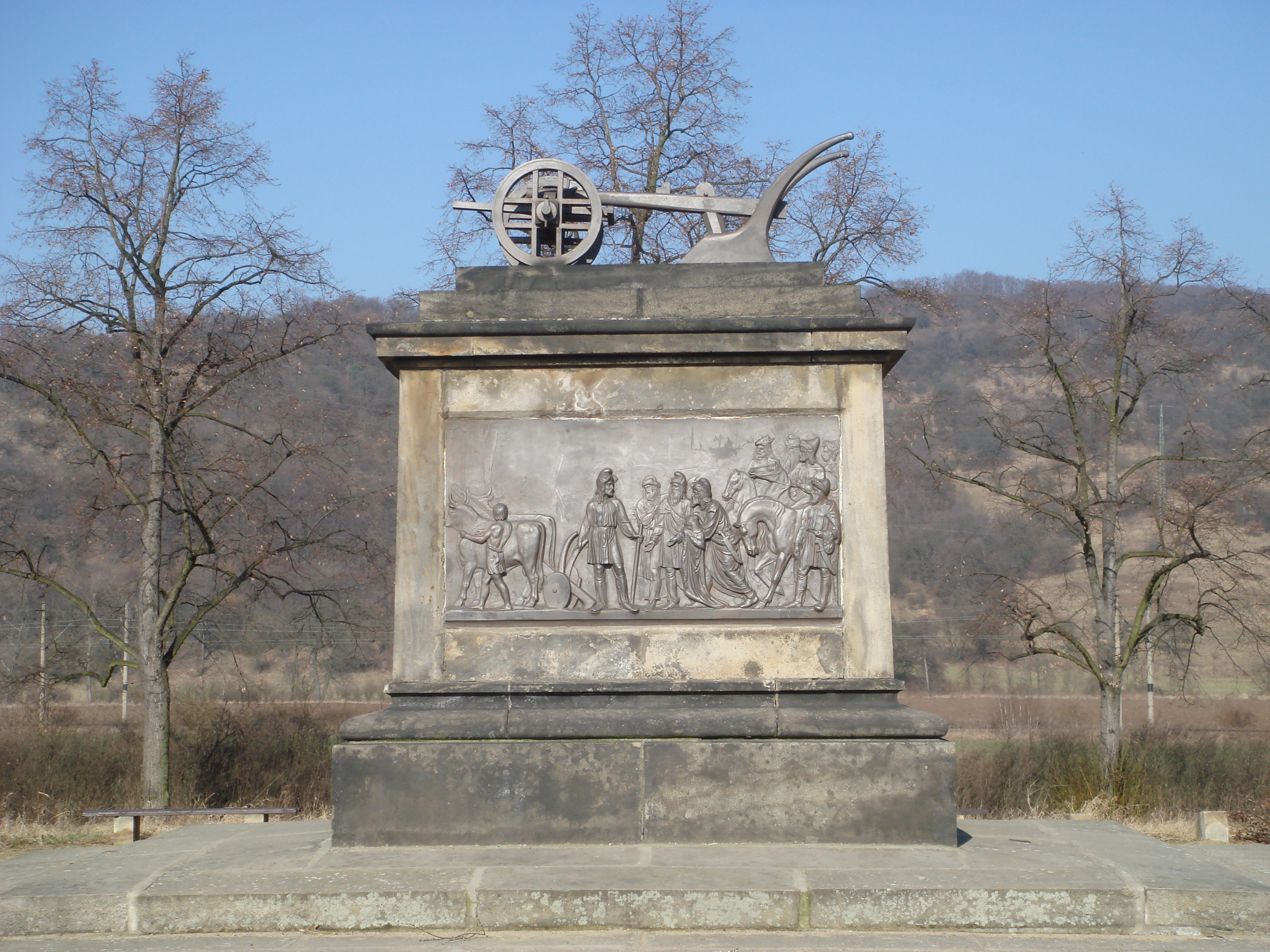
Monument commemorating Přemysl the Ploughman on the Royal field

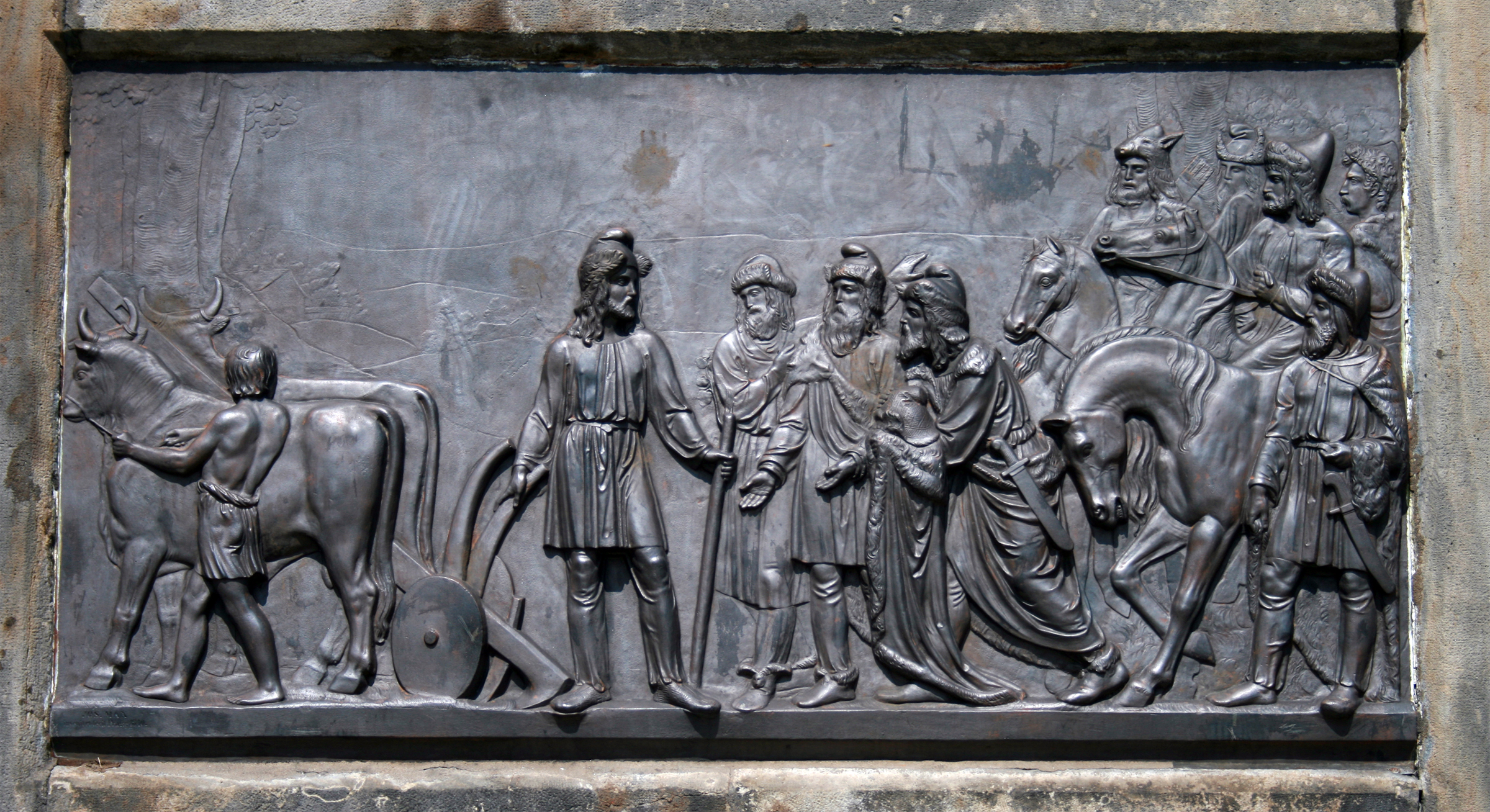
Iron relief on the monument, depicting encounter of Přemysl the Ploughman with the delegation of princess Libuše

Royal field with the monument to Přemysl the Ploughman (Czech: Královské pole s pomníkem Přemysla Oráče) is a Czech national cultural monument (declared as such in 1962). It is composed of the Royal field and the monument to Přemysl the Ploughman erected on the Royal field. It is located near the village Stadice, six kilometres southwest of Ústí nad Labem.

== Royal field ==
The Royal field is a historical place on which according to the legend Přemysl the Ploughman was called to become the ruler of the Czech state. Measurements of the Royal field served in the Middle Ages as a basis of the Czech field pole (Czech: česká polní míra).

== Monument to Přemysl the Ploughman ==
In 1841 count Nostitz erected on the Royal field the monument to Přemysl the Ploughman. The monument was proposed by architect F. Staumann. It is composed of a stone pedestal on the top of which a plough made of cast iron is situated. In the front and the back of the pedestal there are iron reliefs by Josef Max depicting encounter of Přemysl the Ploughman with the delegation of princess Libuše and his arrival to Vyšehrad. On the left side of the pedestal there is an inscription „ZDE OD PLUHU PŘEMYSL k WÉWODSTWJ POWOLÁN. WZDĚLANY MDCCCXLI.“ ("Here from the plough Přemysl called to rule. Done MDCCCXLI."). In 1945, an inscription was added on the right side of the pedestal: „VLÁDA VRÁTILA SE DO RUKOU TVÝCH, Ó LIDE ČESKÝ. 1945“ ("The rule has returned to your hands, O Czech people. 1945").
