= Stadice =

- Village
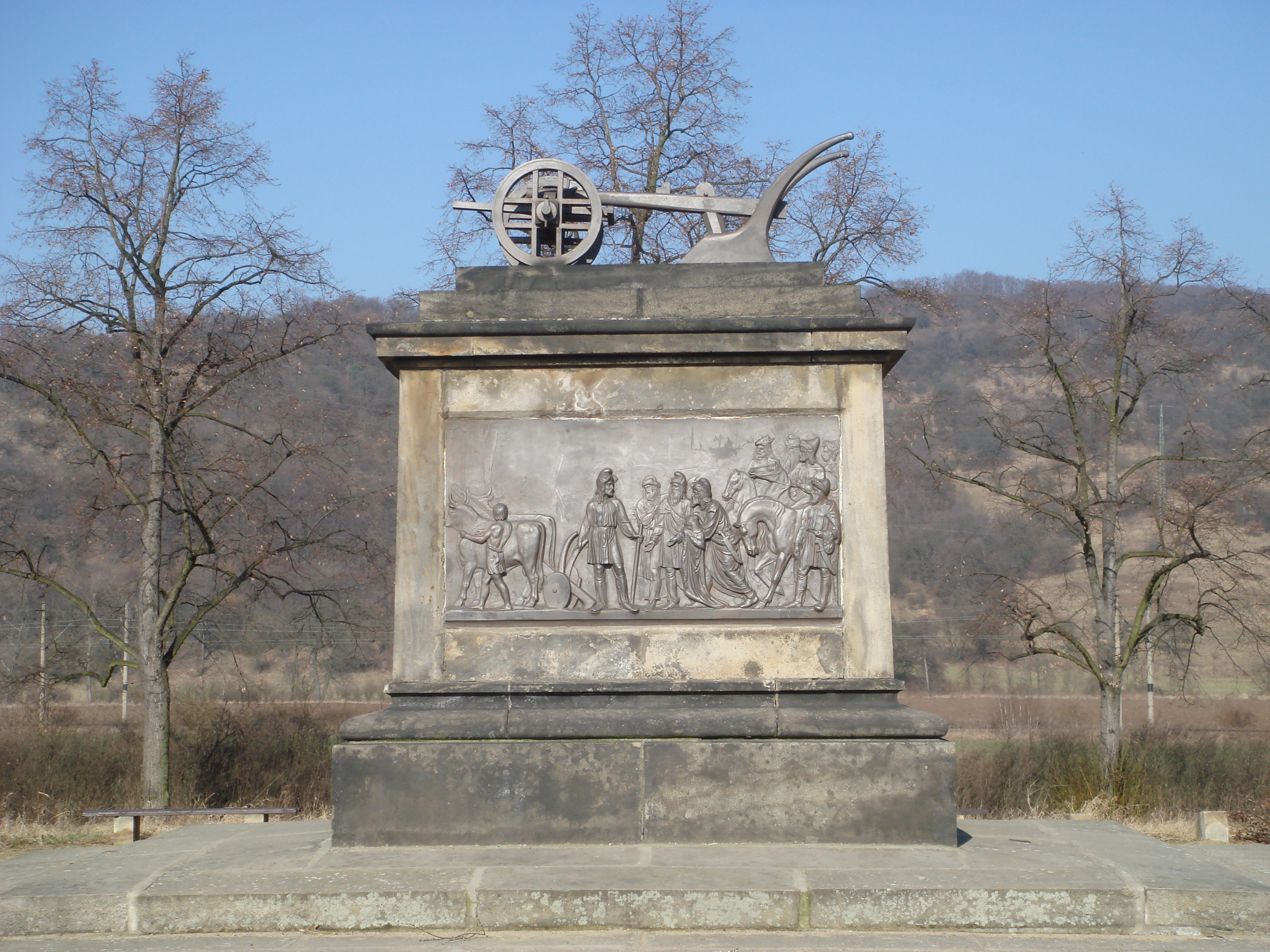
- Royal field with the monument to Přemysl the Ploughman

- Location within Czech Republic
- Coordinates: 50°37′0″N 13°58′0″E
- Country: Czech Republic
- Region: Ústí nad Labem
- District: Ústí nad Labem
- Postal code: 403 13

Stadice (German: Staditz) is a village and administrative part of Řehlovice in Ústí nad Labem District in the Ústí nad Labem Region of the Czech Republic. It was the home of the legendary ruler Přemysl the Ploughman.

== Sights ==
Stadice has a ruined 14th-century Gothic Castle, as well as nearby Royal field with the monument to Přemysl the Ploughman.
