= Florentin Cârpanu =

Romanian public administrator

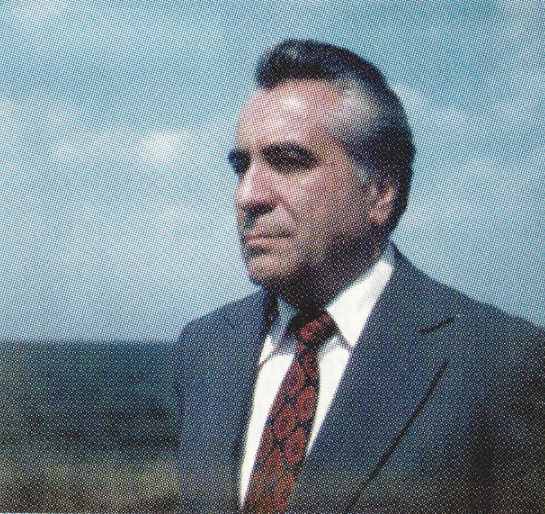

Prefect of Timiș County
- In office 1990–1991

Personal details
- Born: January 29, 1934 Caransebeș, Romania
- Died: February 24, 2022 (aged 88) Caransebeș, Romania
- Profession: Zootechnical engineer

Florentin Cârpanu (29 January 1934 – 24 February 2022) was a Romanian zootechnical engineer, agribusiness executive and public administrator. He served as the first Prefect of Timiș County following the Romanian Revolution of December 1989 and was the long-time general director of Comtim Timișoara, one of the largest agro-industrial enterprises in Romania during the communist period.

== Early life and education ==
Cârpanu was born in Caransebeș, Romania, on 29 January 1934. He graduated from the Institute of Zootechnics and Veterinary Medicine in Arad, earning a degree as a zootechnical engineer.

== Career ==
=== Comtim Timișoara ===
Between 1967 and 1995, Cârpanu served as general director of Comtim Timișoara, a state-owned integrated agro-industrial complex specializing in livestock breeding, meat processing and distribution.

At its peak, Comtim operated 26 subsidiaries organized into four major pig-breeding complexes and three cattle-fattening units, employing approximately 15,000 people. The company processed approximately 1.5 million pigs annually and maintained export operations to several foreign markets.

=== Public office ===
Following the Romanian Revolution of December 1989, Cârpanu was appointed Prefect of Timiș County, serving from 1990 to 1991. He was the first individual to hold this office in the post-communist administrative structure of the county.

== Honours ==
In 1995, Cârpanu was awarded the title of Doctor Honoris Causa by the Banat University of Agricultural Sciences and Veterinary Medicine in Timișoara. In 2010, he was named an honorary citizen of the municipality of Caransebeș.
