= Kranner's Fountain =

Fountain and sculpture in Prague, Czech Republic

- Czech: Krannerova kašna
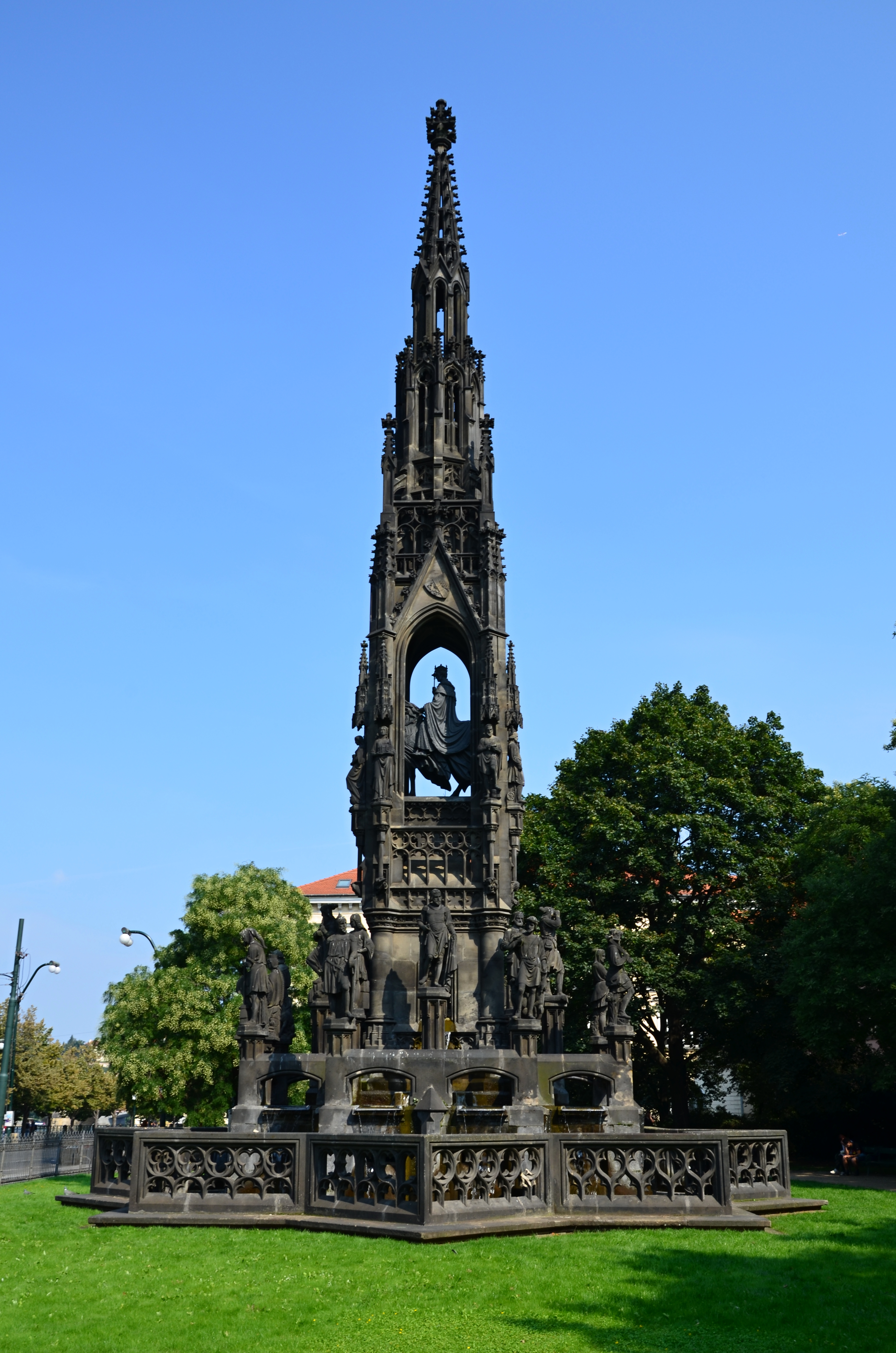
- The fountain in 2013
- Location: Prague, Czech Republic
- 50°4′58.7″N 14°24′48.74″E

Kranner's Fountain, or Kranner Fountain (Czech: Krannerova kašna), is a fountain and neo-gothic monument to Emperor Francis I of Austria, installed in Prague, Czech Republic. It features allegorical sculptures created by Josef Max.
