= Joseph Bergler =

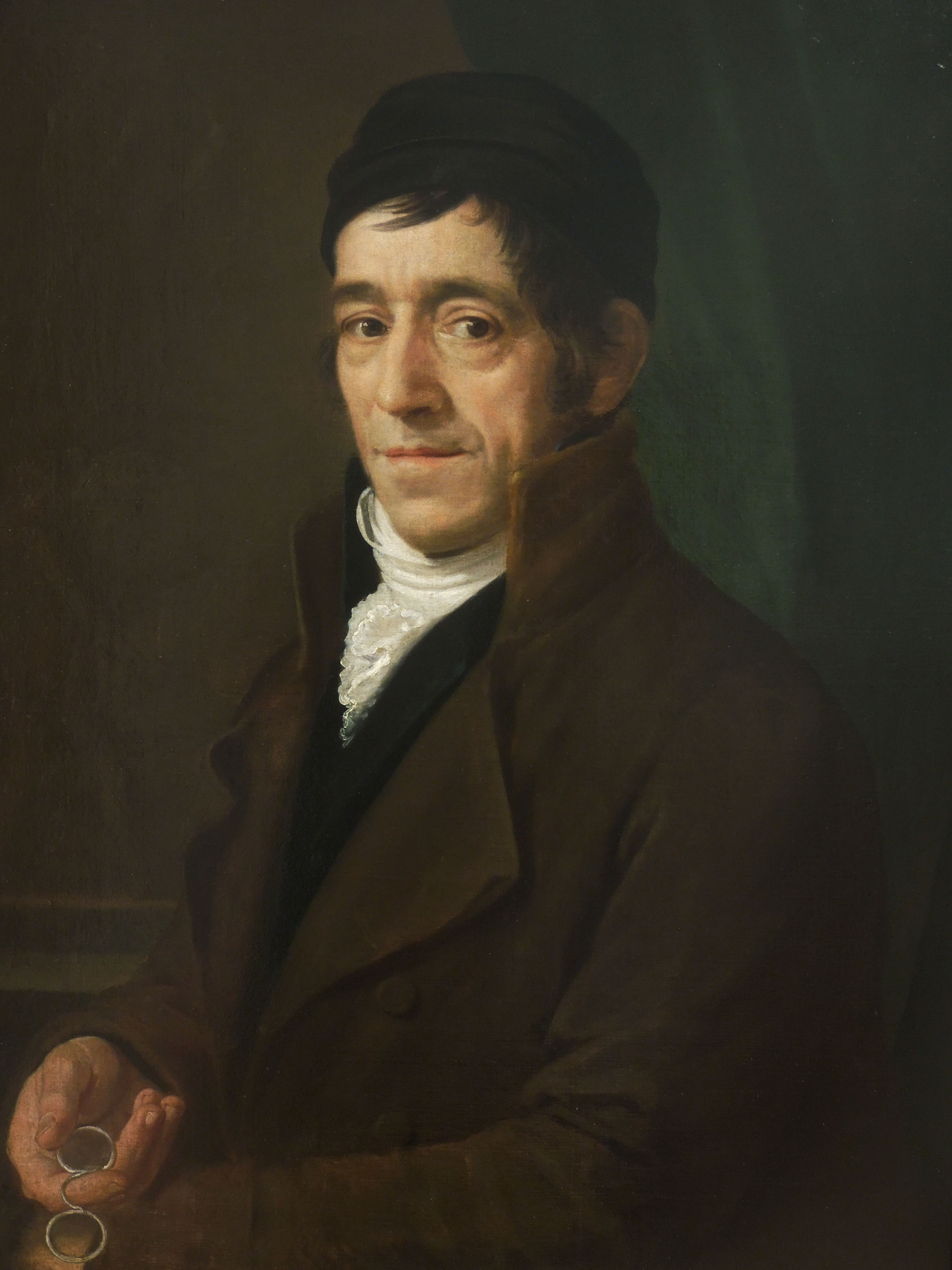
Joseph Bergler by Franz Nadorp, 1823

Joseph Bergler the Younger (1 May 1753 – 25 June 1829) was an Austrian painter and etcher. He was director of the Prague Academy.

== Life ==
Bergler was born in Salzburg, the son of sculptor Joseph Bergler the Elder (1718–1788) who instructed his son. He moved to Italy in 1776 and studied under Martin Knoller in Milan and Anton von Maron in Rome. He lived at the Piazza di Spagna, sharing a place with Felice Giani, Franz Caucig, and others.

He also became acquainted with Maron's brother-in-law, Anton Raphael Mengs, as well as Gavin Hamilton and Giovanni Volpato. In 1786, he returned to live with his parents in Passau. In 1800, he moved to Prague in Bohemia, where he helped to found the Academy of Fine Arts at the Clementinum, and became its first director. Bergler taught Antonín Machek lithography and other graphic techniques. Friedrich von Amerling was also a student. The sculptor Wenzel Prahner became a close friend.

During his sojourn in Rome he made a particular study of the works of Raphael. He was patronized by Count Thun and became chamber painter to Cardinal Auersperg, prince bishop of Passau. Bergler created altar-pieces for a number of churches in Prague and the vicinity. In 1774, he created works for the side altars in the "Mariahilf" pilgrim church in Passau.

He died in Prague on 25 June 1829, aged 76.

== Works ==
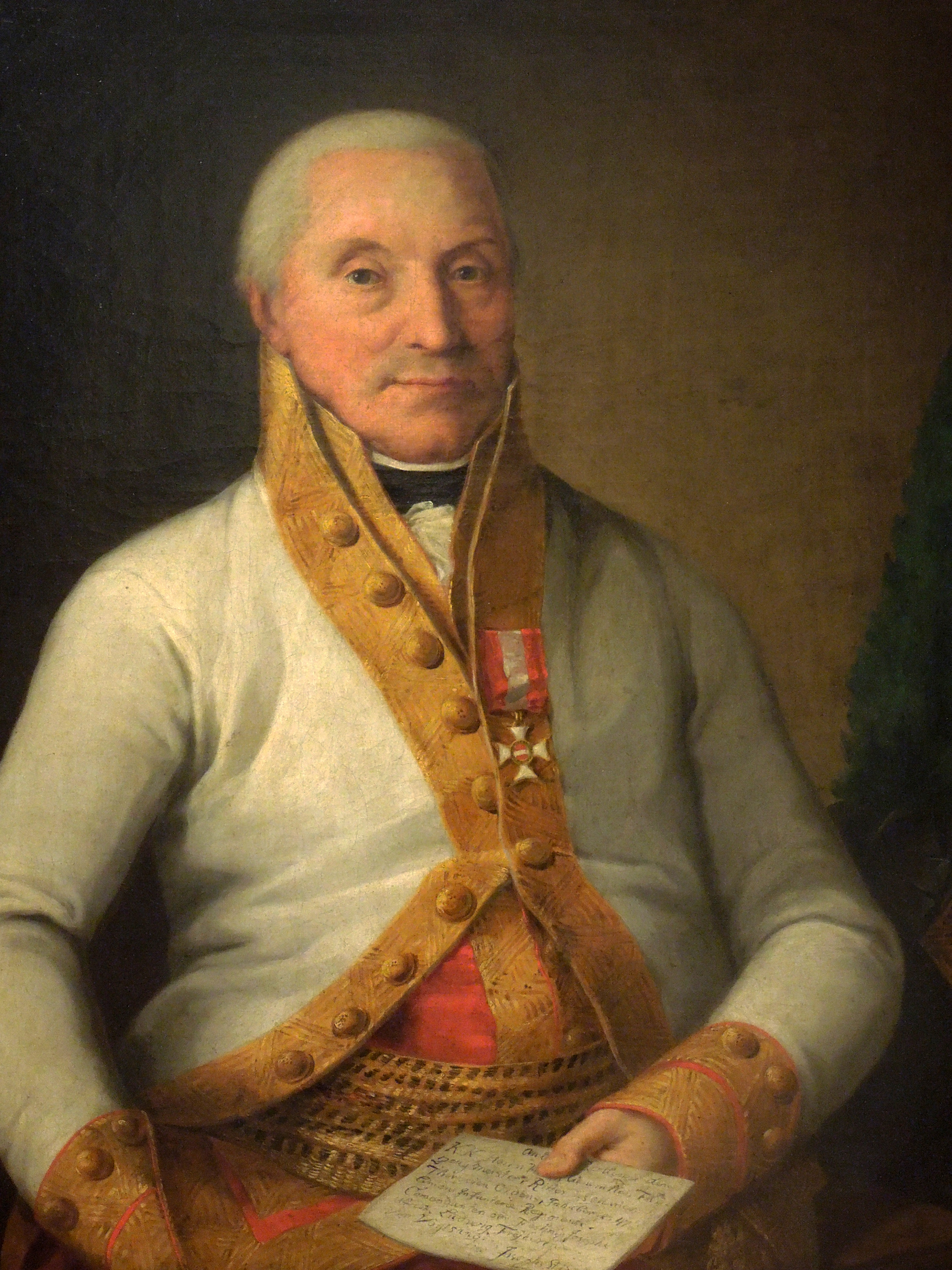
Portrait of General Ludwig von Vogelsang, 1810/1811

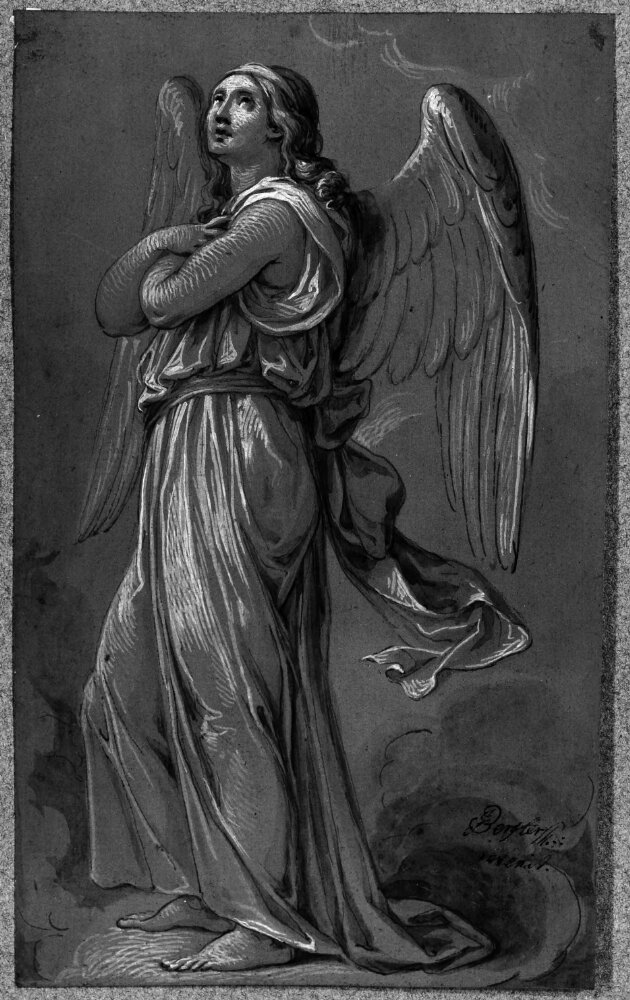
Angel

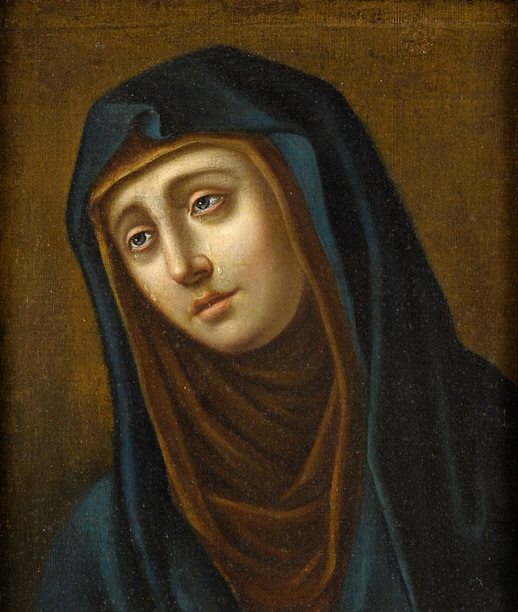
Mater Dolorosa, 1805

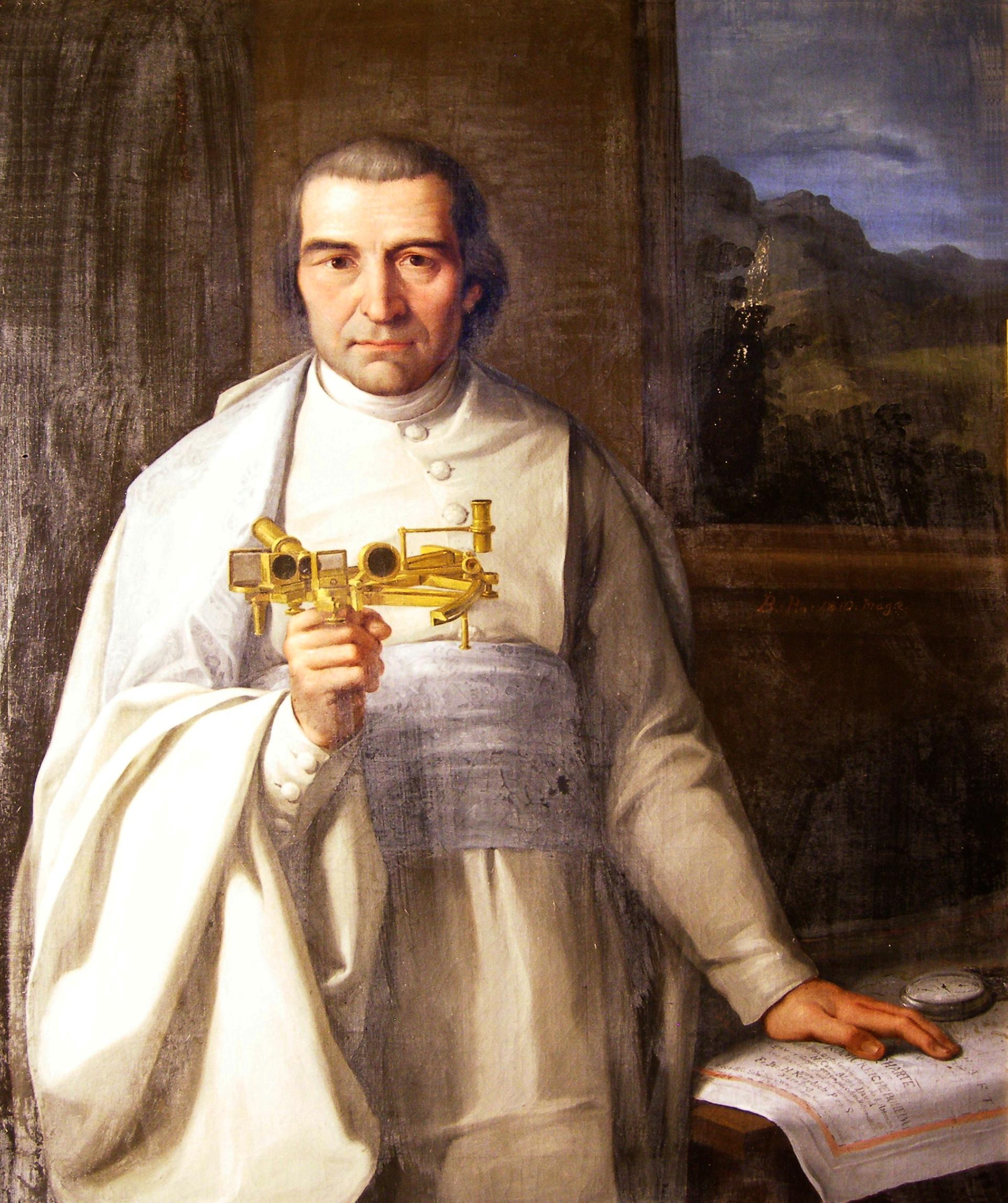
Alois Martin David, 1810

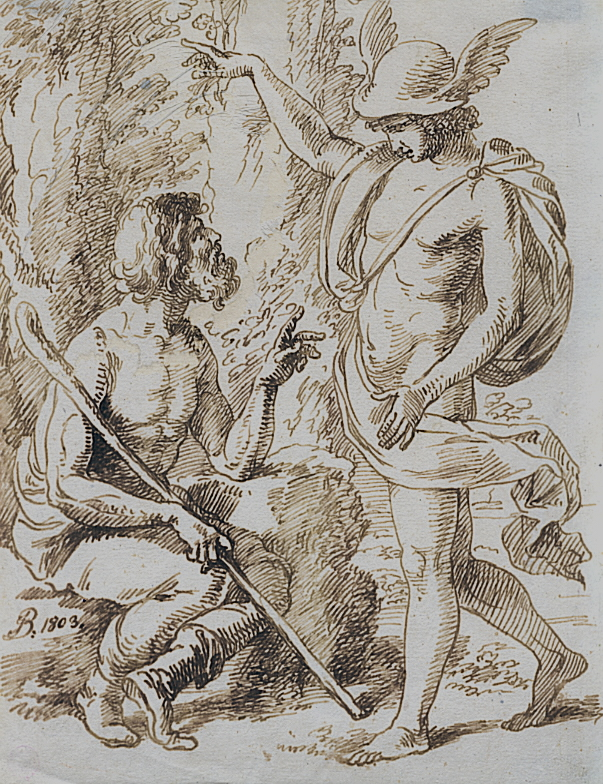
Hermes and the Pilgrim,1803
