= Carmen Sylva National Pedagogical College =

Carmen Sylva National Pedagogical College Colegiul Național Pedagogic „Carmen Sylva”
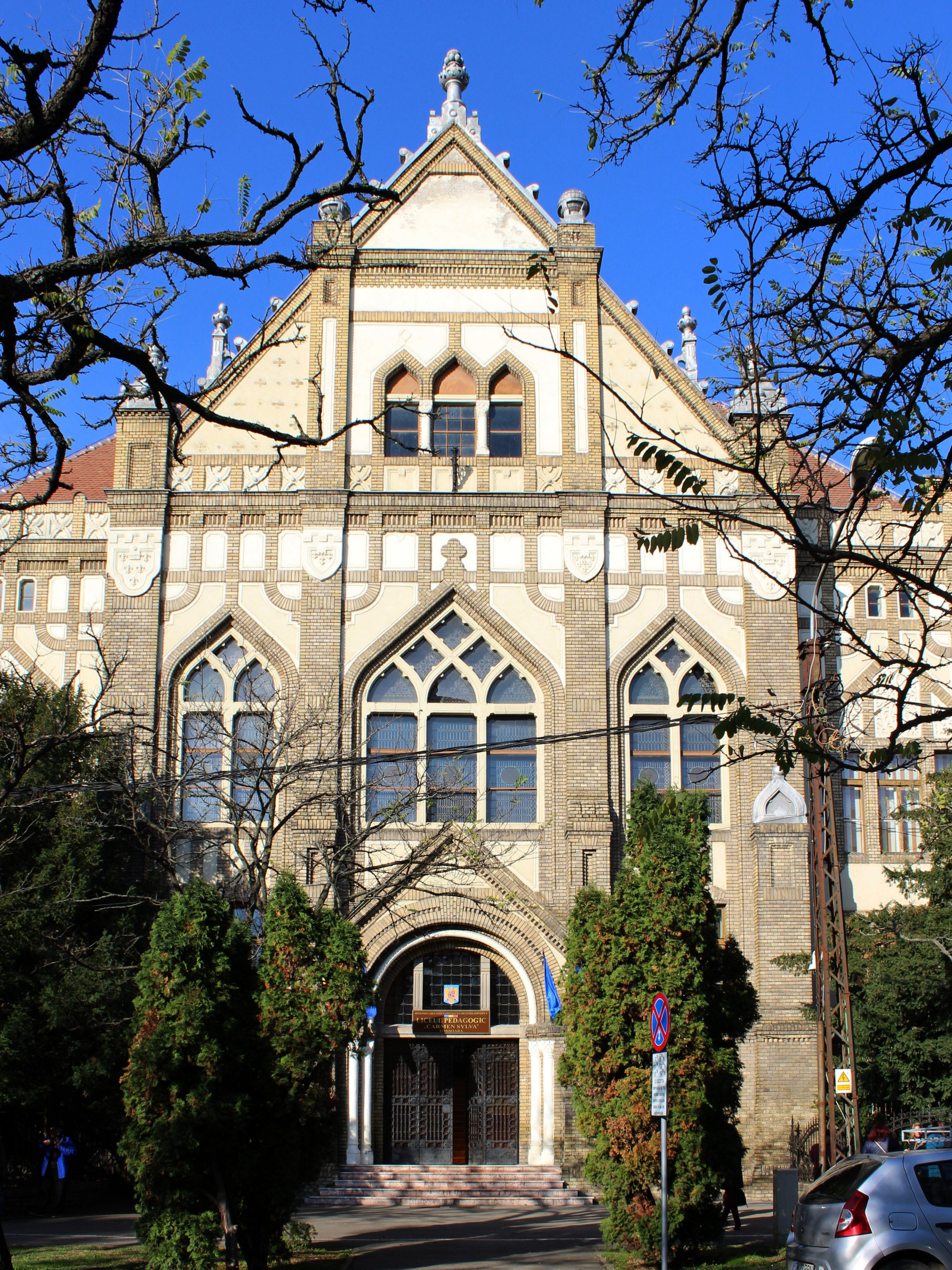

Location
- 45 Constantin Diaconovici Loga Boulevard, Timișoara
- Coordinates: 45°45′15″N 21°14′7″E

Information
- Type: Pedagogical high school
- Established: 1884; 141 years ago
- Authority: Ministry of National Education
- Principal: Claudia Muntean
- Faculty: 92 (2019/2020)
- Enrollment: 1,465 (2019/2020)
- Language: Romanian
- Website: colegiulcarmensylvatimisoara.ro

Carmen Sylva National Pedagogical College is a high school with pedagogical profile in Timișoara, named after Queen Elisabeth of Romania, patroness of the arts bearing the pseudonym Carmen Sylva. The college operates with 43 classrooms, four laboratories, a library with over 50,000 volumes, boarding school and canteen.

== History ==
In 1881, a private girls' low school was established in Timișoara, under the principalship of Mrs. Benedek. The school operated with four middle school classes and a body of five teachers. Three years later, a boarding school opens next to the girls' school, and a fifth grade class is added to the middle school classes. As a result, the institution was transformed into a girls' high school with teaching in Hungarian and became a state school, with Guillem Vallo as its principal between 1884 and 1889. The courses took place in an old palace rented in the Cetate district, Bersuder Palace, located on the current George Coșbuc Street.

From 1889, the school was taken over by Rosina Marsits, who ran it until 1912. During her term as principal, the new premises were built. For the construction, the Timișoara City Hall provided a plot of 8,703 m^{2} on which the current building was built between 1902 and 1903. Built in English neo-Gothic, Victorian style, according to the plans of architects Jacob Klein from Timișoara and Lipót Baumhorn from Budapest, the building cost 385,000 kronen. On September 1, 1903, the first classes were held in the new building. It was originally called the Girls' High School and had six grades, and in 1916, it was transformed into a high school with eight grades. There was also a field hospital in the building during the war.

After the union of Banat with Romania, the Romanian Girls' High School began to function in the same building. The courses were opened on 15 October 1919 by Ioan Fodor, a Romanian language teacher who came from Blaj, appointed principal. In 1919–1920, the Romanian Girls' High School operated with only five classes and 136 students. Due to a lack of higher education teachers who could teach high school subjects in Romanian, teachers from the Old Kingdom were hired. Right from the first year of operation, at the unanimous request of the teaching staff, the Education Minister decided that the institution should be called the Carmen Sylva Girls' High School.

In 1929, the high school assimilated the girls' middle school in the city. Many other spaces and schools are being built in this decade. Between 1941 and 1944 the building was used as a hospital by the Romanian army, and between 1944 and 1946 by the Soviet army. The courses are held in various other places. In 1948 the name of the school changed to the Girls' High School, until 1955. In that year, it becomes the Middle School no. 3, and the classes become mixed. In March 1957, the school was named after 1848 revolutionary Eftimie Murgu. During this period, in addition to the high school courses, the Textile Technical High School and the Mixed Commercial Vocational School also operated in the building. The lithography also functioned here, and in the wing of the boarding school functioned the ICPPD and the Camp Administration.

Since 1969, ninth grade and post-secondary classes with a pedagogical profile have been built for the specializations of teacher and educator. It was not until 2002 that the high school was renamed Carmen Sylva. It got its current name in 2018.
