= Josef Kranner =

Czech architect

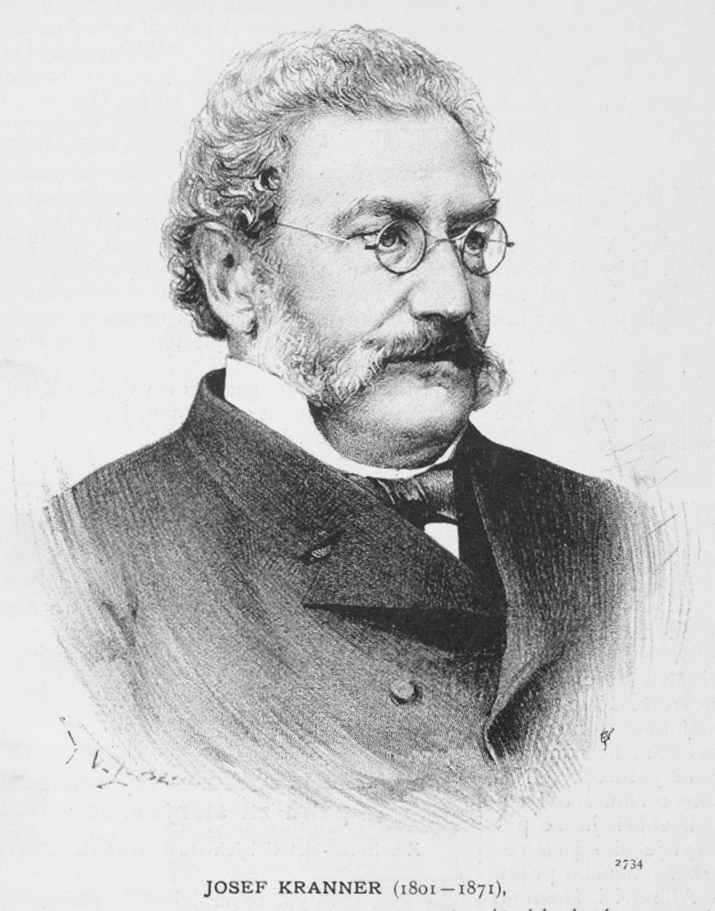
Josef Kranner, portrayed by Jan Vilímek (1888)

Josef Ondřej Kranner, or Joseph Andreas Kranner (13 June 1801 – 20 October 1871) was a Czech architect. He became the first Master Builder at St. Vitus Cathedral when construction resumed there in 1861.

== Life and work ==
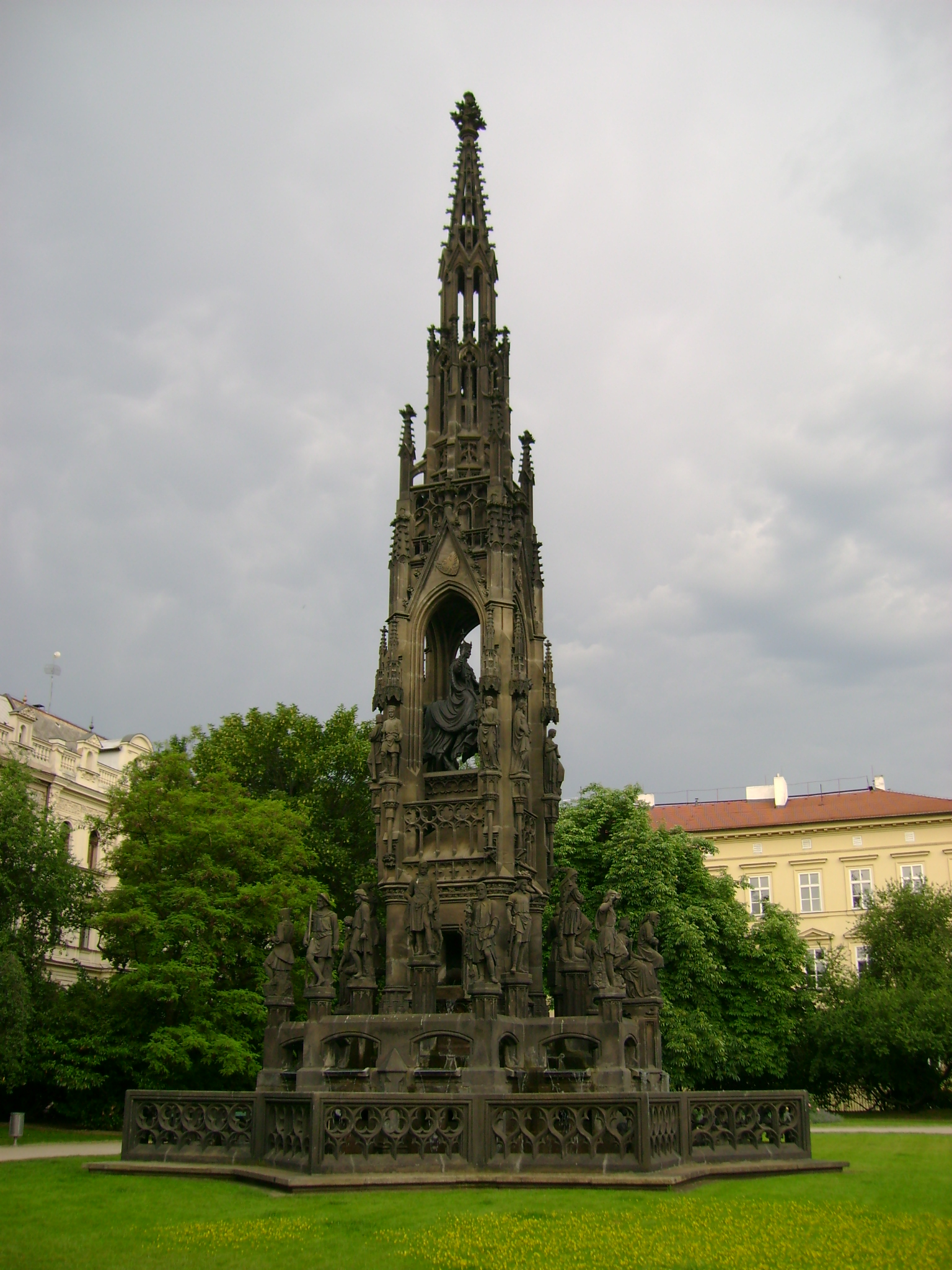
Monument/Fountain to Emperor Francis I, Prague

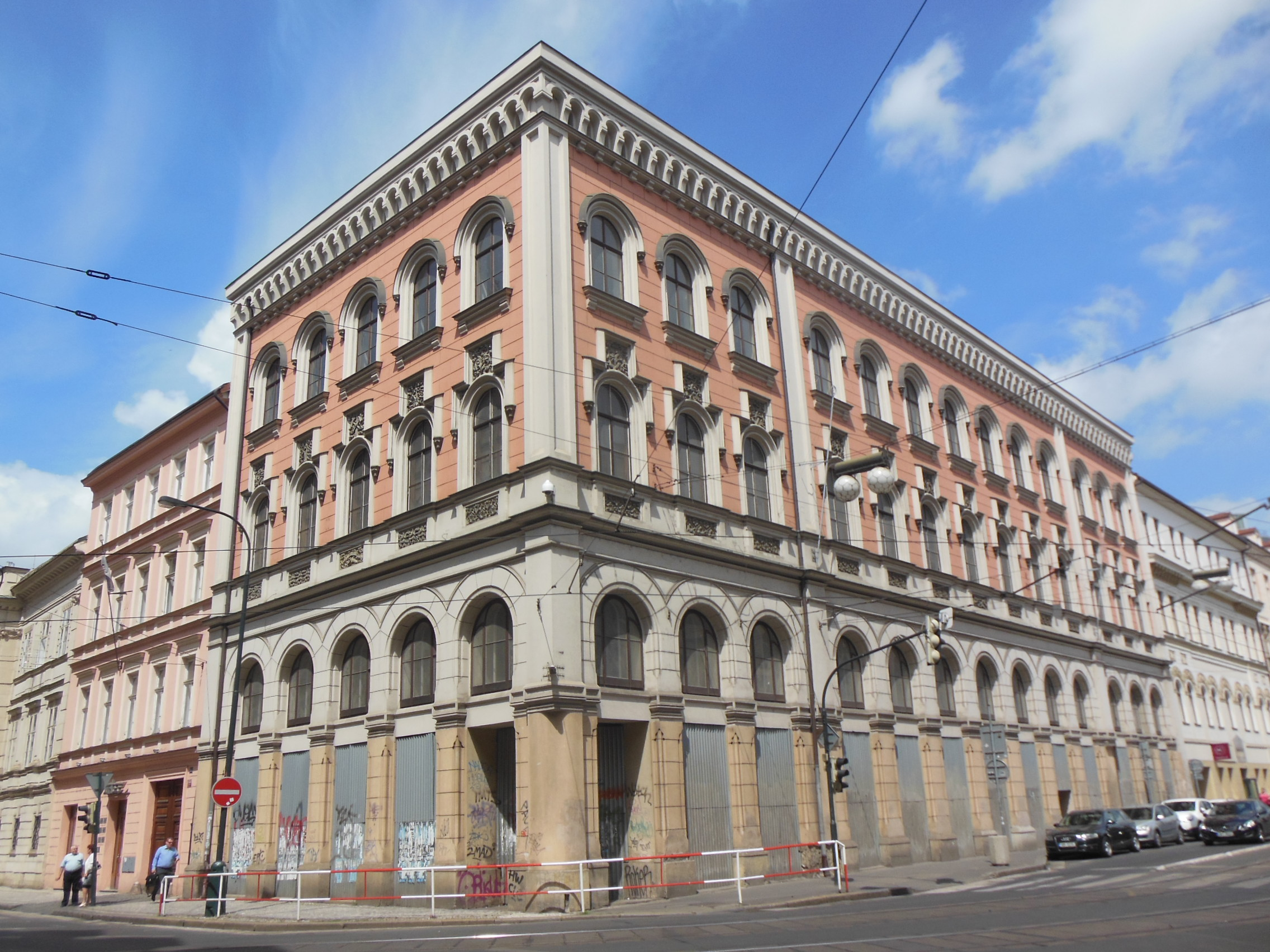
Lanna Palace in the New Town of Prague, designed by Kranner in the 1850s

Kranner was born on 13 June 1801 in Prague. He was the tenth child born to Jan Ludvík Kranner (1764–1828), an Imperial Master Builder and stonemason. He completed his apprenticeship as a stonemason while attending Prague Polytechnic. This was followed by studies at the Academy of Fine Arts, Vienna. In 1822, he made study trips to Venice and Rome. Two years later he travelled to Paris, via Marseille.

His first project as a Master Builder involved designing a family crypt for the Austrian State Chancellor, Prince Klemens von Metternich at his castle in Plasy. When this was completed in 1828, he took over his recently deceased father's studio; introducing modern methods he had observed in France. In 1830, he received his certificate as a Master Builder for Prague, followed in 1835 by that city's recognition of his status as a Master Stonemason.

He was deeply interested in the Medieval buildings of his homeland. Together with the historian František Palacký, the painter Josef Vojtěch Hellich, and the architect Hermann Bergmann, he created a book on ancient Bohemia. It was edited by Hellich and the cultural revivalist, Jan Erazim Vocel, and published in 1845 under the title "Grundzüge der böhmischen Alterthumskunde" (Basics of Bohemian Antiquity).

Later, he became interested in a proposal by Václav Michal Pešina, the Canon of St. Vitus Cathedral, to resume construction, which had been paused since the 1770s, and expand the building. In 1844, they presented a program for renovation. While these plans were being considered, he entered a competition for designing a church dedicated to Saints Cyril and Methodius, but his design was rejected for being "Too German". Beginning around 1855, he was involved in managing construction of the Votivkirche in Vienna.

In the 1850s, Kranner designed the Lanna Palace in New Town of Prague for the South Bohemian industrialist Adalbert Lanna the Elder.

The first meeting of the Cathedral Building Association would not take place until 1859. At the second meeting, in 1860, it was proposed that he be given the official position of Master Builder for the project. Kranner would head the work from 1861 to 1866; consisting mostly of repairs. In 1867, he presented complete plans for a three-aisle expansion of the cathedral. He died on 20 October 1871 in Vienna, before that phase of the project was completed, and Josef Mocker was appointed to replace him as manager.

== Sources ==
- Constantin von Wurzbach: "Kranner, Joseph." In: Biographisches Lexikon des Kaiserthums Oesterreich (Biographical Lexicon of the Empire of Austria). Part 13 Kaiserlich-königliche Hof- und Staatsdruckerei, Vienna 1865, p. 129 f. (digitalised).
- Rudolf Müller (1883). "Kranner, Joseph A." . Allgemeine Deutsche Biographie (in German). Vol. 17. Leipzig: Duncker & Humblot. pp. 33–43.
- Josef Kranner. In: Architektenlexikon Wien 1770–1945. Published by the Vienna Architecture Centre. Vienna 2007.
