= Lipovei =

District in Timișoara

Lipovei is a district of Timișoara. It is located in the northern part of the city and is crossed by Calea Lipovei, hence the name. It is bounded by Calea Sever Bocu (commonly Lipovei), Divizia 9 Calaverie Street, Aristide Demetriade Street and Măcin Street.

In the past, it was occupied by Viile Fabric, an old colony on the outskirts of the Timișoara Fortress that also bore the name of Rudolfsheim or Rezsőföld – after crown prince Rudolf. The colony, which stretched from the Green Forest, UMT–Continental area, Calea Sever Bocu and Calea Aradului, used to cultivate vines. In the 1870s–1880s, approximately 100 hectares were planted with vines, with an annual production of 2,000–2,500 hectoliters of wine. It covered a large part of the consumption needs of wealthy Timișoara residents, even reaching restaurants. The vineyards, however, were destroyed over time, and so the land was suitable for agriculture and housebuilding. After World War I, many poor residents of the city were allocated house lots and thus the territory began to populate. Viile Fabric was transformed during the years of socialism into a large neighborhood of workers' blocks.
