= Chrást =

Chrast is a town in the Pardubice Region of the Czech Republic.

Chrast or Chrást may also refer to places in the Czech Republic:

- Chrást (Nymburk District), a municipality and village in the Central Bohemian Region
- Chrást (Plzeň-City District), a municipality and village in the Plzeň Region
- Chrást (Příbram District), a municipality and village in the Central Bohemian Region
- Chrast, a village and part of Dolní Krupá (Havlíčkův Brod District) in the Vysočina Region
- Chrást, a village and part of Kovářov in the South Bohemian Region
- Chrást, a village and part of Křesetice in the Central Bohemian Region
- Chrást, a village and part of Mladá Boleslav in the Central Bohemian Region
- Chrást, a village and part of Pivkovice in the South Bohemian Region
- Chrást, a village and part of Tišice in the Central Bohemian Region
- Chrást, a village and part of Týnec nad Sázavou in the Central Bohemian Region

== See also ==
- Chrasť nad Hornádom, a municipality and village in Slovakia
