= Procopius of Sázava =

Czech hermit

Saint Procopius of Sázava
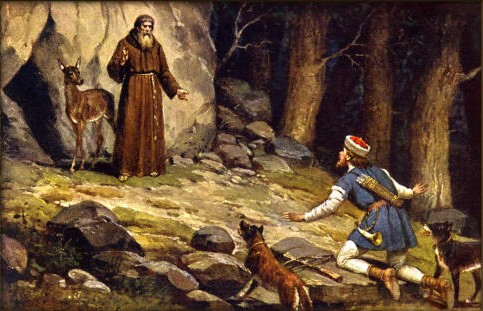
- Duke Oldřich meets Procopius during a hunt by Josef Mathauser (1846–1917)

Abbot of Sázava, Venerable
- Born: c. 970; Chotouň, Bohemia
- Died: 25 March 1053; Sázava, Bohemia
- Venerated in: Eastern Orthodox Church; Roman Catholic Church; Apostolic Exarchate of the Greek Catholic Church in the Czech Republic
- Canonized: 2 June 1204 (Roman Catholic); 9 March 2017 (Eastern Orthodox) by Pope Innocent III or by a liturgical elevation and translation of his body to the altar in Sázava and the Holy Synod of the Russian Orthodox Church respectively
- Feast: 14 July (Roman Catholic); 16 September (Eastern Orthodox)
- Attributes: devil ploughing before him; depicted as an abbot with a book and whip, devil at his feet; with a stag (or hind) near him; with Saints Adalbert, Ludmila, and Vitus; hermit with a skull and a girdle of leaves
- Patronage: Bohemia

Saint Procopius of Sázava (Latin: Procopius Sazavensis, Czech: Prokop Sázavský; died 25 March 1053) was a Czech Christian canon and hermit, who is venerated as a saint in the Eastern Orthodox Church and Roman Catholic church.

== Life ==
Little about his life is known with certainty. According to hagiographical tradition, he was born in 970, in a Central Bohemian village of Chotouň near Kouřim. He studied in Prague and was ordained there.

He was married and had a son, called Jimram (Emmeram), but later entered the Benedictine order, presumably at Břevnov Monastery, and eventually retired to the wilderness as a hermit, living in a cave on the banks of Sázava River, where over time he attracted a group of fellow hermits. The community of hermits was incorporated as a Benedictine monastery by the duke of Bohemia in 1032/3, now known as Sázava Monastery, or St Procopius Monastery, where he served as the first abbot for the span of twenty years until his death.

== Veneration ==
Local veneration of Procopius as a saint is recorded for the 12th century when the first biography Vita minor has been written. He was first canonized by the Roman Catholic church in 1204; however, there is still much debate on how his canonization was performed. It is stated that Pope Innocent III canonized him in 1204 or that during a liturgical elevation and translation of his body to the altar in Sázava his canonization took place. This was at that time the equivalent to canonization

After his canonization, he became greatly venerated throughout Bohemia, to the point of his being considered the national saint of the Kingdom of Bohemia. His life and wonders were described by the Vita antiqua from the second half of the 13th century, and Vita maior from the 14th century. His remains were transferred to All Saints Church in Prague Castle in 1588.

The Cyrillic portion of the Reims Gospel manuscript (since 1554 kept in Reims, France) were attributed to Procopius in the 14th century, and Charles IV commissioned an extension of the manuscript in Glagolitic script.

Sázava Monastery had been destroyed in the Hussite Wars, but the church was re-established in the 17th century, as well as the monastery buildings changed in a castle. The Baroque-era frescos "The Meeting of Hermit Procopius with Prince Oldřich" and "Abbot Procopius Giving Alms" besides other frescos depicting scenes the saint's life and the history of the monastery, were discovered there (under layers of 19th-century paint) in the 2000s.

Hugo Fabricius, a monk at Sázava, wrote a new life of St. Procopius in the 18th century, Požehnaná Památka Welikého Swěta Diwotworce Swatýho Prokopa ("The Blessed Legacy of the Great Miracle Worker of the World, St. Procopius").

Numerous churches in Bohemia are dedicated to him, and many Baroque-era statues and paintings of the saint are extant. Among these is the early 18th century Procopius statue on Charles Bridge by Ferdinand Brokoff. Modern retellings of the saint's life were published by Czech poets Jaroslav Vrchlický and Vítězslav Nezval.

The "Cave of St. Procopius", the supposed site of his original hermitage, was discovered by Method Klement OSB in the 1940s.

On 9 March 2017, by the decision of the Holy Synod of the Russian Orthodox Church, the name of "Venerable Procopius, Abbot of Sázava" was added to the menologium of the Russian Orthodox Church.

== See also ==
- Devil's Furrow – Czech landform legendarily created by St. Procopius
