= Statues of John of Matha, Felix of Valois and Saint Ivan, Charles Bridge =

Statues in Prague, Czech Republic

Coordinates: 50°05′13″N 14°24′28″E

Statues of John of Matha, Felix of Valois and Saint Ivan
- Sousoší svatého Jana z Mathy, Felixe z Valois a Ivana (Czech)
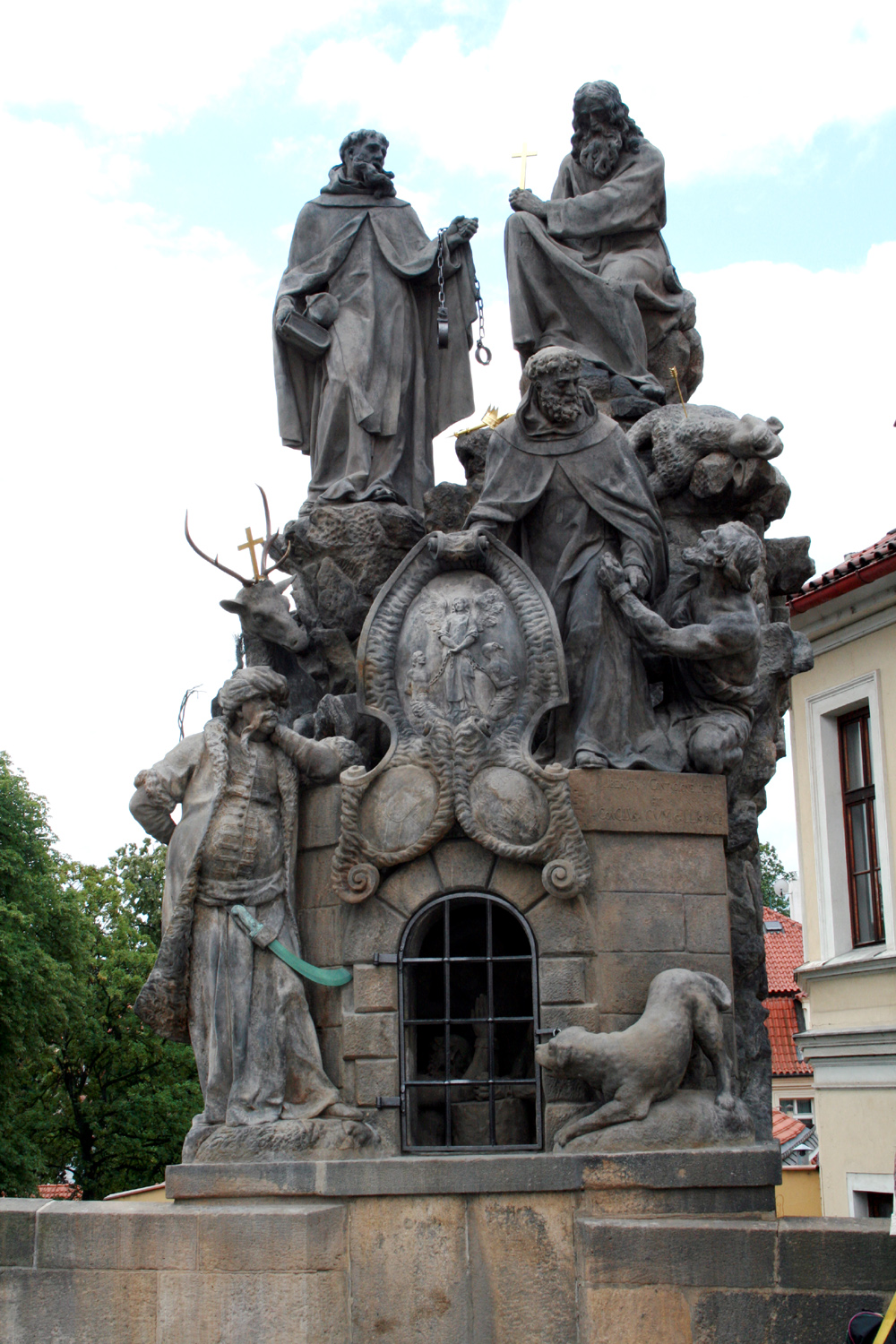
- The statues in 2007
- Artist: Ferdinand Brokoff
- Subject: John of Matha; Felix of Valois; Saint Ivan
- Location: Prague, Czech Republic

The statues of John of Matha, Felix of Valois and Saint Ivan (Czech: Sousoší svatého Jana z Mathy, Felixe z Valois a Ivana) are outdoor sculptures by Ferdinand Brokoff, installed on the south side of the Charles Bridge in Prague, Czech Republic.
