= Chrášťany (Kolín District) =

- Municipality
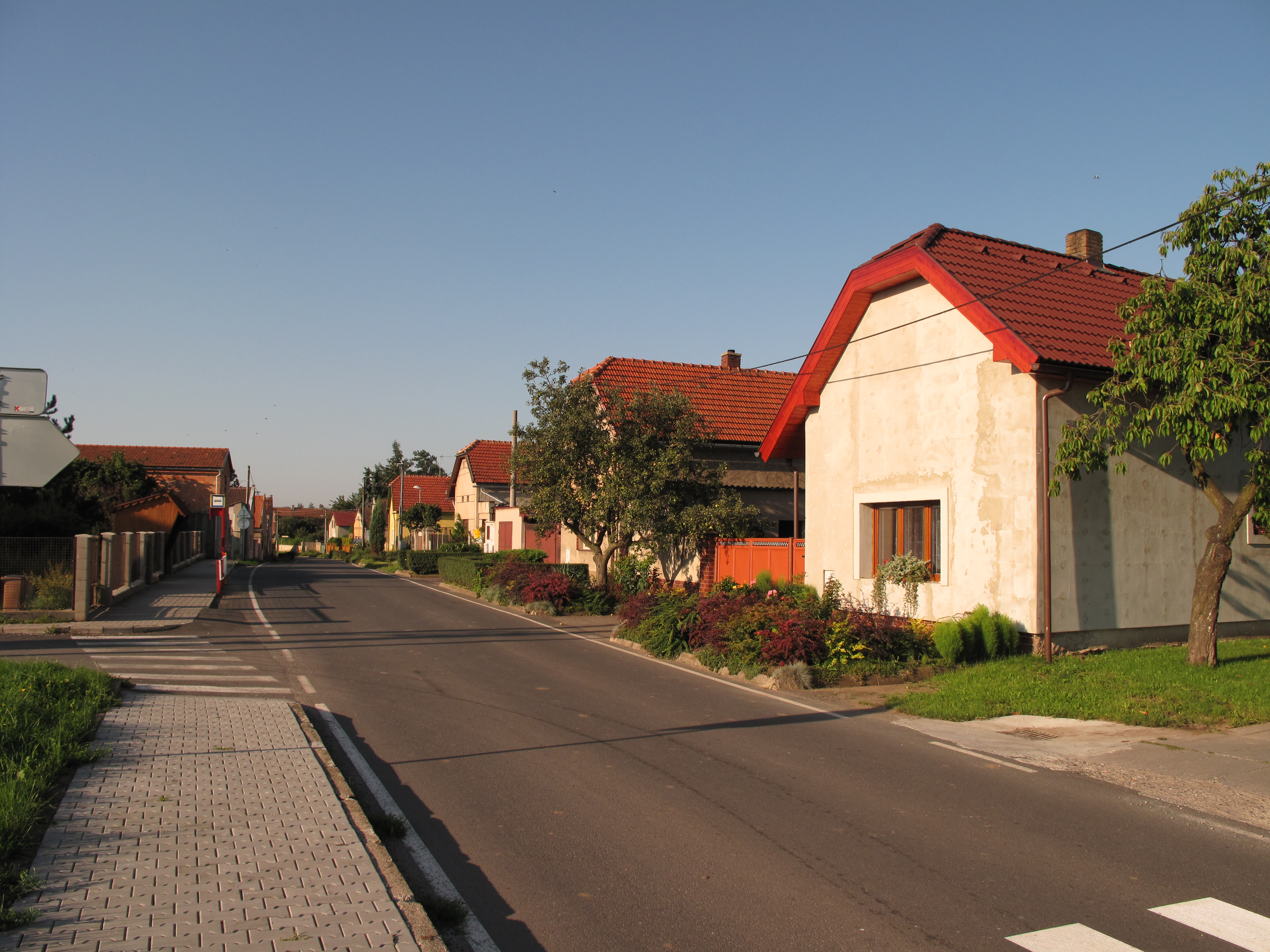
- Bylany, a part of Chrášťany

- Location in the Czech Republic
- Coordinates: 50°3′56″N 14°55′49″E
- Country: Czech Republic
- Region: Central Bohemian
- District: Kolín
- First mentioned: 1306

Area
  - Total: 14.47 km^{2} (5.59 sq mi)
- Elevation: 256 m (840 ft)

Population (2026-01-01)
  - Total: 795
  - Density: 54.9/km^{2} (142/sq mi)
- Time zone: UTC+1 (CET)
  - Summer (DST): UTC+2 (CEST)
- Postal code: 282 01
- Website: obec-chrastany.cz

Chrášťany is a municipality and village in Kolín District in the Central Bohemian Region of the Czech Republic. It has about 800 inhabitants.

== Administrative division ==
Chrášťany consists of three municipal parts (in brackets population according to the 2021 census):

- Chrášťany (234)
- Bylany (317)
- Chotouň (158)

== Etymology ==
The name is derived either from the word Chrášťané (meaning "people who came from Chrást"), or from chrást (i.e. 'shrub') and chrášťané ("people living near a shrub").

== Geography ==
Chrášťany is located about 19 kilometres (12 mi) west of Kolín and 28 km (17 mi) east of Prague. It lies in a flat agricultural landscape of the Central Elbe Table. The highest point is at 268 m (879 ft) above sea level. The Bylanka Stream flows through the municipality.

== History ==
The first written mention of Chrášťany is from 1306, when it was part of the Kouřim estate. In 1614, the village was acquired by the Smiřický noble family and annexed to the Černý Kostelec estate.

The first written mention of Bylany is from 1295. Until the Hussite Wars, it was a church property, then it was owend by various nobles. Before 1558, Bylany became a part of the Černý Kostelec estate.

Chotouň was first mentioned in 1249, when it was a property of the Olomouc bishopric. In the first half of the 15th century, it became part of the Poděbrady estate.

== Demographics ==
Historical population

Year	Pop.	±%
1869	1,072	—
1880	1,239	+15.6%
1890	1,343	+8.4%
1900	1,363	+1.5%
1910	1,240	−9.0%

Year	Pop.	±%
1921	1,154	−6.9%
1930	1,287	+11.5%
1950	910	−29.3%
1961	940	+3.3%
1970	882	−6.2%

Year	Pop.	±%
1980	650	−26.3%
1991	595	−8.5%
2001	622	+4.5%
2011	662	+6.4%
2021	709	+7.1%

Source: Censuses

== Transport ==
The I/12 road from Prague to Kolín runs along the southern municipal border.

== Sights ==
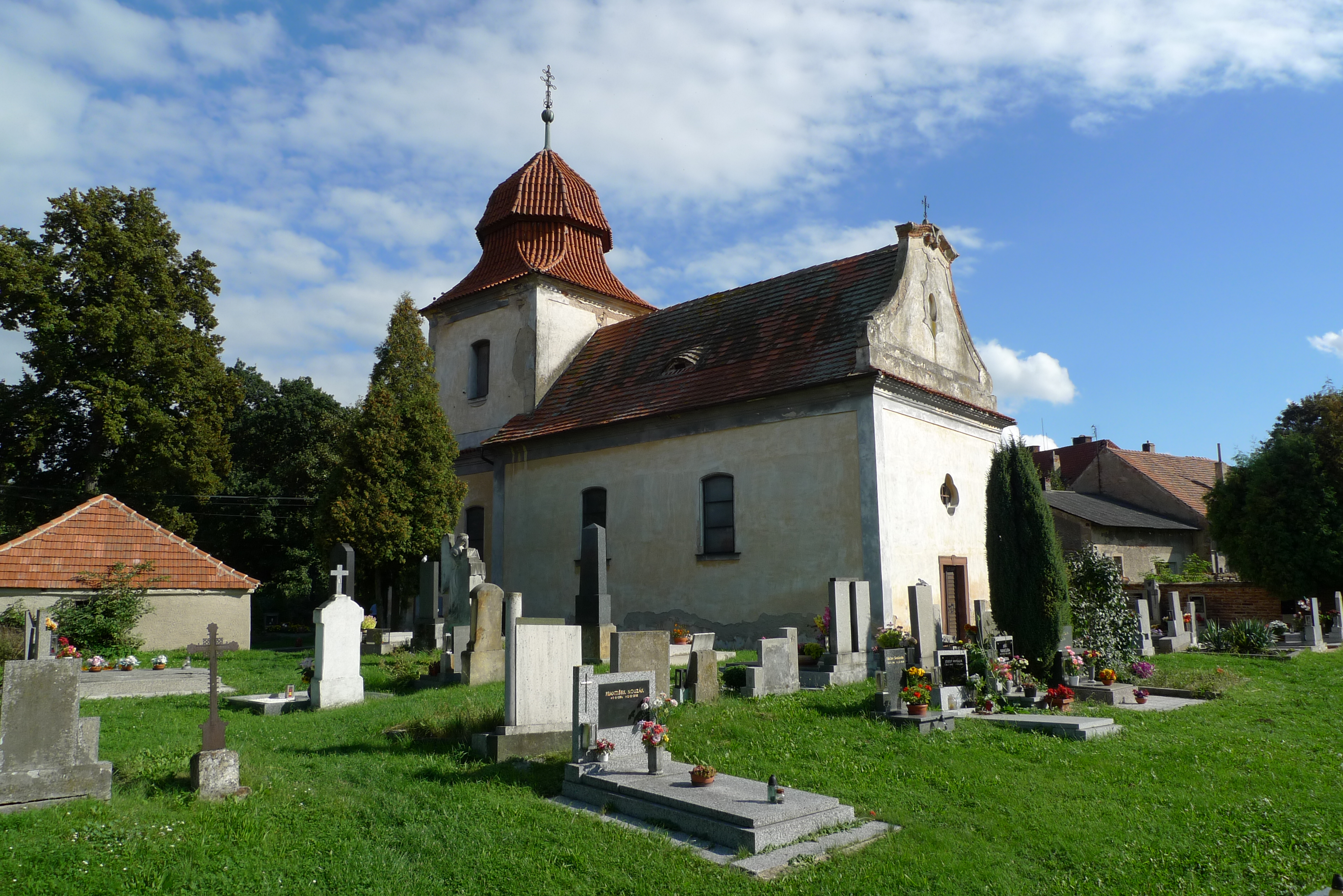
Church of Saint Bartholomew

The main landmarks of the municipality are the two churches. The Church of Saint Procopius is located in Chotouň. It was built in the Baroque style in 1708–1710 according to the design by Jan Santini Aichel.

The Church of Saint Bartholomew is located in Bylany. It is a cemetery church, built in the Baroque style in 1770.

== Notable people ==
- Procopius of Sázava (?–1053), saint; born in Chotouň according to legend
