= Chrášťany (Benešov District) =

- Municipality
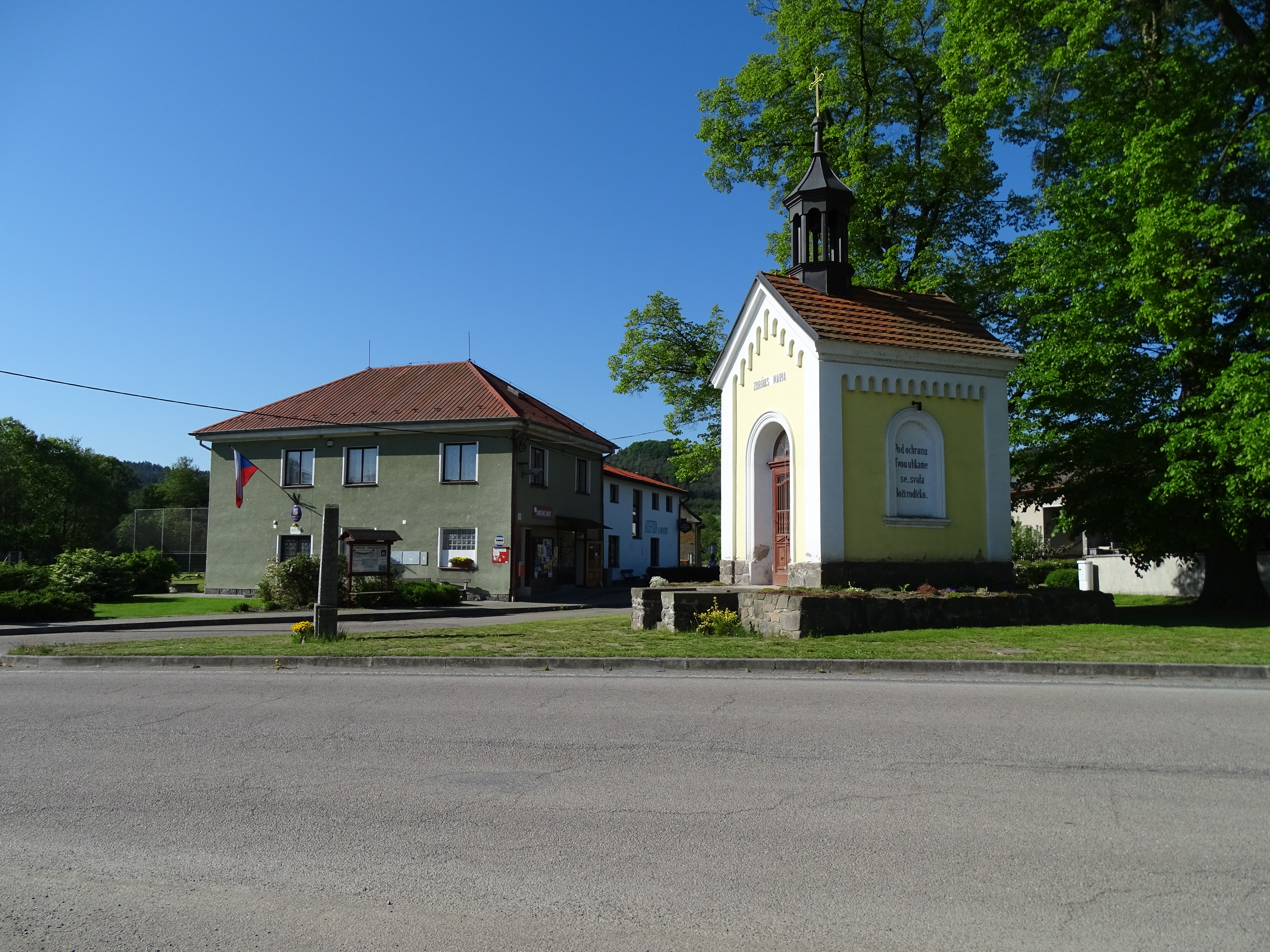
- Centre of Chrášťany with the municipal office

- Location in the Czech Republic
- Coordinates: 49°47′32″N 14°34′55″E
- Country: Czech Republic
- Region: Central Bohemian
- District: Benešov
- First mentioned: 1318

Area
  - Total: 11.54 km^{2} (4.46 sq mi)
- Elevation: 294 m (965 ft)

Population (2026-01-01)
  - Total: 262
  - Density: 22.7/km^{2} (58.8/sq mi)
- Time zone: UTC+1 (CET)
  - Summer (DST): UTC+2 (CEST)
- Postal codes: 256 01, 257 44, 257 56
- Website: chrastany.cz

Chrášťany is a municipality and village in Benešov District in the Central Bohemian Region of the Czech Republic. It has about 300 inhabitants.

== Administrative division ==
Chrášťany consists of four municipal parts (in brackets population according to the 2021 census):

- Chrášťany (159)
- Benice (9)
- Černíkovice (45)
- Soběšovice (31)

== Etymology ==
The name is derived either from the word Chrášťané (meaning "people who came from Chrást"), or from chrást (i.e. 'shrub') and chrášťané ("people living near a shrub").

== Geography ==
Chrášťany is located about 7 kilometres (4 mi) west of Benešov and 28 km (17 mi) south of Prague. It lies in the Benešov Uplands. The highest point is on the slopes of the hill Neštětická hora at 467 m (1,532 ft) above sea level. The stream Tloskovský potok flows through the municipality.

== History ==
The first written mention of Chrášťany is from 1318. From 1597, the village was a part of the Konopiště estate and shared its owners.

== Demographics ==
Historical population

Year	Pop.	±%
1869	550	—
1880	561	+2.0%
1890	549	−2.1%
1900	573	+4.4%
1910	541	−5.6%

Year	Pop.	±%
1921	526	−2.8%
1930	515	−2.1%
1950	338	−34.4%
1961	339	+0.3%
1970	294	−13.3%

Year	Pop.	±%
1980	244	−17.0%
1991	185	−24.2%
2001	184	−0.5%
2011	240	+30.4%
2021	244	+1.7%

Source: Censuses

== Transport ==
There are no railways or major roads passing through the municipality.

== Sights ==
Among the protected cultural monuments in the municipality are the Chapel of the Virgin Mary in the centre of Chrášťany, built in the Neo-Romanesque style in 1887, and a Baroque homestead in Soběšovice from around 1750.
