= Amélie Florimond de Norville =

Illegitimate daughter of Louis XV

- Born: 11 January 1753
- Died: 27 September 1790 (aged 37)
- Spouse: Jacques Pancrace Ange de Faure (m. 1780)
- Issue: 2
- Father: Louis Florimond de Norville (allegedly); Louis XV (likely)

Amélie Florimond de Norville or Amélie Florimond, after her marriage Amélie de Faure (11 January 1753 — 27 September 1790) was likely an illegitimate daughter of Louis XV, King of France.

== Life ==
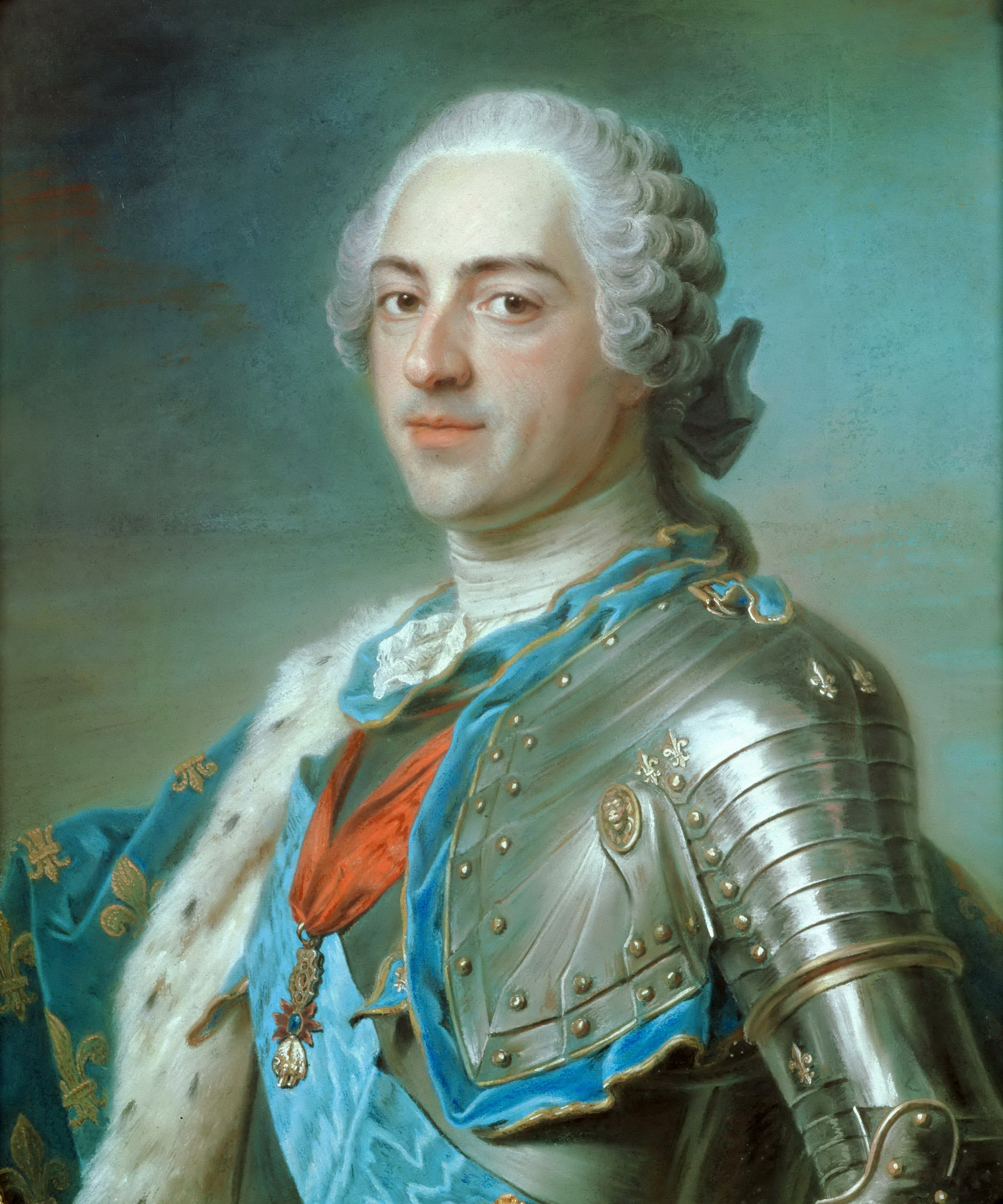
Louis XV (Quentin de La Tour, Maurice, 1748)

Amélie Florimond de Norville was born in Paris on 11 January 1753 to Jeanne Perray. The next day, her birth was registered in the church of Saint-Eustache, Paris, when her father was stated to be a certain bourgeois from Paris called Louis Florimond de Norville. However, no other trace of a man of this name has been found, and the paternity of the king is suggested by later evidence and believed to be proved by students of the life of Louis XV.

Under the reign of the Louis XV, on 12 January 1772, before a notary called Mr. Arnoult, a pension was granted to Amélie Florimond de Norville of 2,000 livres. Under the reign of the next monarch (Louis XVI) on her marriage contract dated 30 June 1780 a pension of 3,000 livres was again granted to Amélie and her future children from the Royal treasury. Under the reign of the same king, a further pension of 30,000 livres was again granted to her and her children after her death. On 4 December 1815, after the Bourbon Restoration in the reign of Louis XVIII, this decision was confirmed.

On 1 June 1780, Amélie Florimond married Jacques Pancrace Ange de Faure (1739–1824), with whom she had two children. She died on 27 September 1790. However it is speculated she actually moved with her lover to England during the revolution. In 1805 her daughter Amélie de Faure (1788—1855) married Anne Joachim François de Melun, Vicomte de Melun, Seigneur of Brumetz (1785—1849), and had two sons and four daughters.
