= Felix of Valois =

French Catholic former Cistercian hermit (1127–1212)

Saint Felix of Valois OSsT
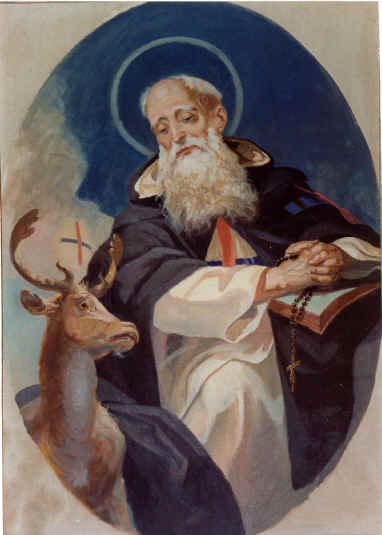
- Born: April 16, 1127 possibly Valois, France
- Died: November 4, 1212 (aged 85); Monastery of Cerfroid, Brumetz, Picardy (now the department of Aisne), France
- Venerated in: Catholic Church
- Canonized: May 1, 1262, Rome by Pope Urban IV
- Major shrine: Monastery of Cerfroid, Brumetz, Department of Aisne, France
- Feast: November 4 November 20 (General Roman Calendar 1679-1969)
- Attributes: white stag with a cross between his horns

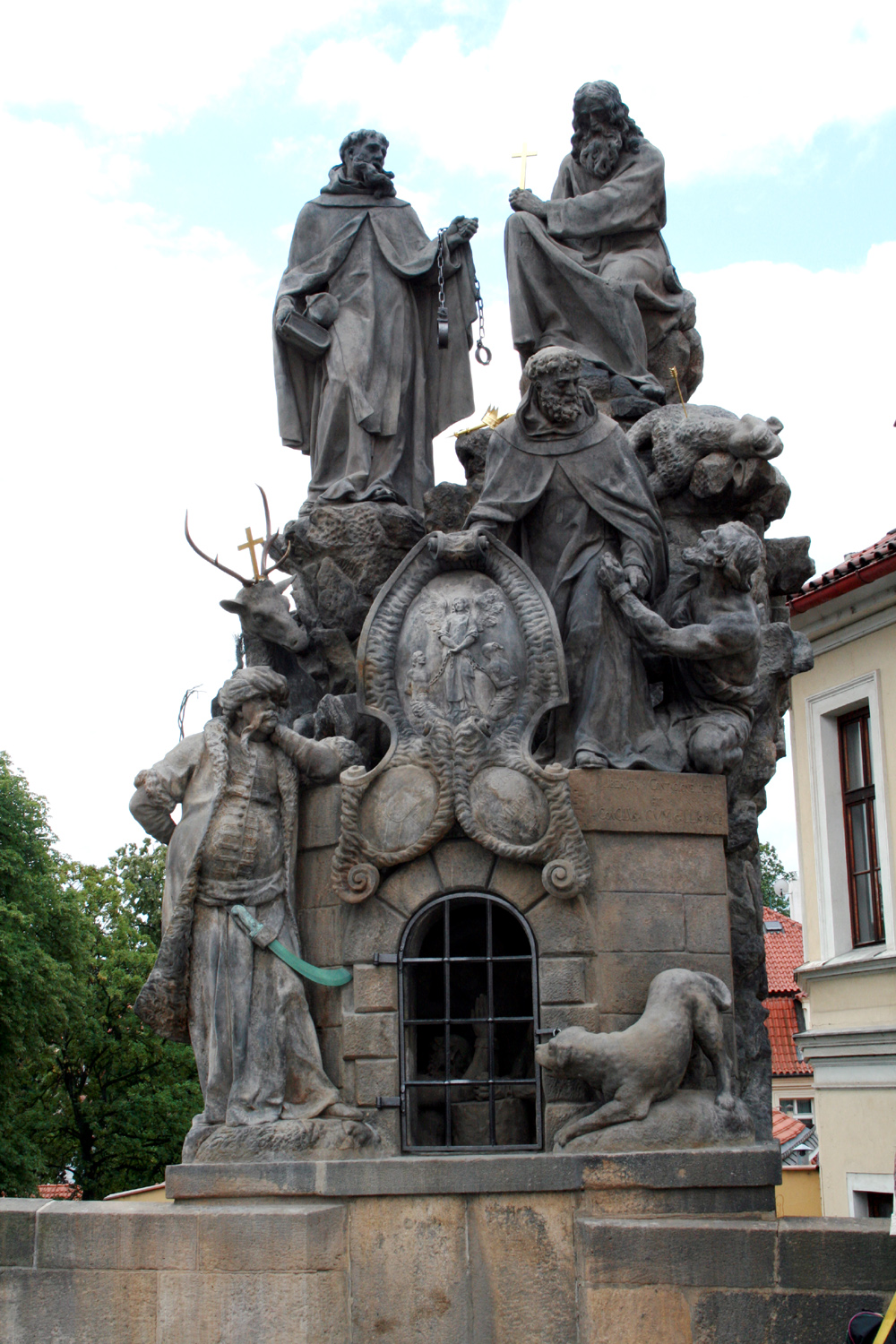
Statues of John of Matha, Felix of Valois and Saint Ivan, Charles Bridge, Prague

Felix of Valois, OSsT (French: Félix de Valois; (April 16, 1127 – November 4, 1212) was a French Catholic former Cistercian hermit and a co-founder (with John of Matha) of the Trinitarian Order.

== Life ==
Butler says that Felix was born in 1127. He was surnamed Valois because he was a native of the province of Valois. Tradition holds that he renounced his possessions and retired to a dense forest in the Diocese of Meaux, where he gave himself to prayer and contemplation.

John of Matha, a young nobleman, a native of Provence, and doctor of divinity, who was later ordained priest, having heard of the holy hermit of Cerfroid, sought him out, and put himself under his direction. John proposed to him the project of founding an order for the redemption of captives. Felix, though seventy years of age, readily agreed.

== The Trinitarians ==
Felix and John set out for Rome in the depth of winter and arrived there in January 1198, the beginning of the pontificate of Innocent III. They had letters of recommendation from the Bishop of Paris, and the new pope received them with kindness and lodged them in his palace. Though little in favor of new orders, Innocent III granted approval to this enterprise in a Bull of 17 December 1198, under the named of the Order of the Holy Trinity for the Redemption of Captives. Innocent appointed John of Matha superior-general and commissioned the Bishop of Paris and the Abbot of Saint Victor to draw up for the institute a rule, which he subsequently confirmed. Felix returned to France to establish the Order. He was received with great enthusiasm, and King Philip Augustus authorized the institute in France and fostered it by signal benefactions.

Margaret of Blois donated 20 acres (81,000 m^{2}) of the wood where Felix had built his first hermitage, and on almost the same spot he erected the famous Monastery of Brumetz, the motherhouse of the Order. Within forty years, the Order possessed six hundred monasteries in every part of Europe. John was obliged to go to Rome to found a house of the Order, the church of which, Santa Maria in Navicella, still stands on the Caelian Hill. Felix remained in France to look after the interests of the congregation. He founded a house in Paris attached to the Church of Saint Maturinus, which afterwards became famous under Robert Guguin, master general of the order.

Felix died amongst his fellow Trinitarians at their motherhouse in Cerfroid on November 4, 1212.

== Veneration ==
Though no bull of his canonization is extant, it is the tradition of his institute that he was canonized by Pope Urban IV on May 1, 1262. Du Plessis tells us that his feast was kept in the Diocese of Meaux as early as the year 1215. On October 21, 1666, Pope Alexander VII confirmed his status as a saint because of his immemorial cult. In 1679 Felix's feast was transferred to November 20 by Pope Innocent XI, where it was placed in the General Roman Calendar because, since 1613, November 4 was the feast day of Charles Borromeo In 1969, his feast was restored to November 4, his dies natalis.

== Legacy ==
Saint-Felix-de-Valois is a village in the province of Quebec. St. Felix de Valois Parish is located in Bankstown, Australia. St. Felix Church in Clifton Springs, New York is named after him. It is now part of Saint Peter's Roman Catholic Parish in the Diocese of Rochester, New York. The current church building was built in 1895 and the name of the parish was changed at that time from St. Agnes to St. Felix by the pastor Felix O'Hanlon.
