= Statue of Adalbert of Prague, Charles Bridge =

Statue in Prague, Czech Republic

Statue of Adalbert of Prague
- Socha svatého Vojtěcha (Czech)
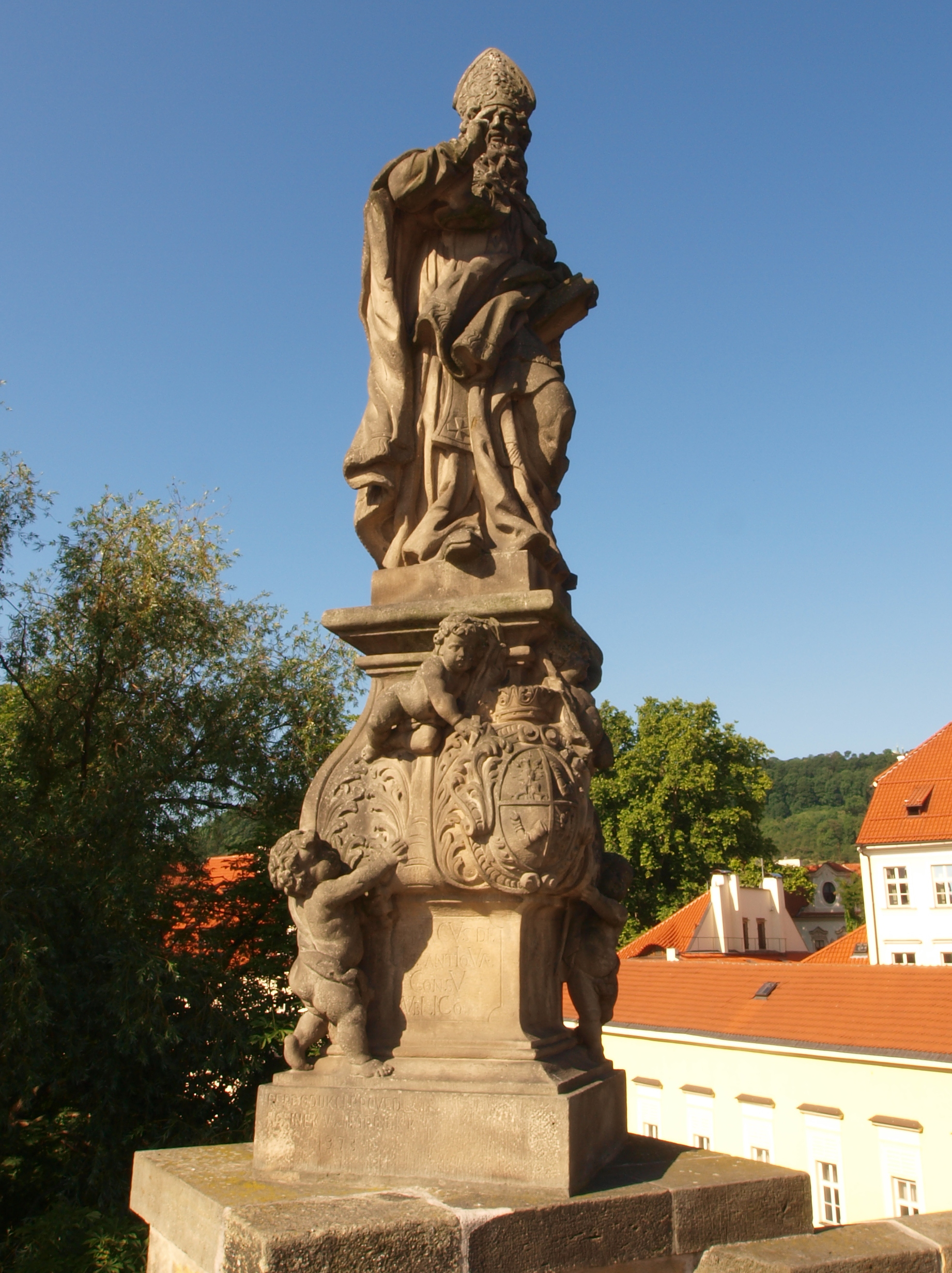
- The sculpture in 2012

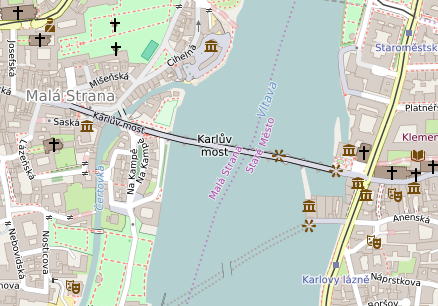
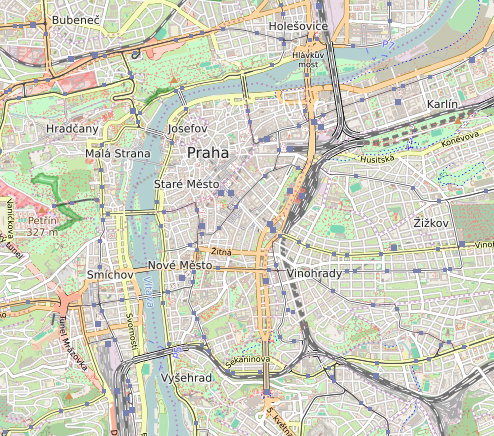
- Location on the Charles Bridge Location in Central Prague
- Artist: Ferdinand Brokoff; Michal Jan Josef Brokoff
- Type: Sculpture
- Subject: Adalbert of Prague
- Location: Prague, Czech Republic; 50°05′13″N 14°24′29″E

The statue of Adalbert of Prague (Czech: Socha svatého Vojtěcha) by Ferdinand Brokoff and Michal Jan Josef Brokoff is installed on the south side of the Charles Bridge in Prague, Czech Republic.

The original statue was moved, and a copy now stands in its place.
