= Statues of Saints Vincent Ferrer and Procopius, Charles Bridge =

Statues in Prague, Czech Republic

Coordinates: 50°05′12″N 14°24′34″E

Statues of Saints Vincent Ferrer and Procopius
- Sousoší svatých Vincence Ferrerského a Prokopa (Czech)
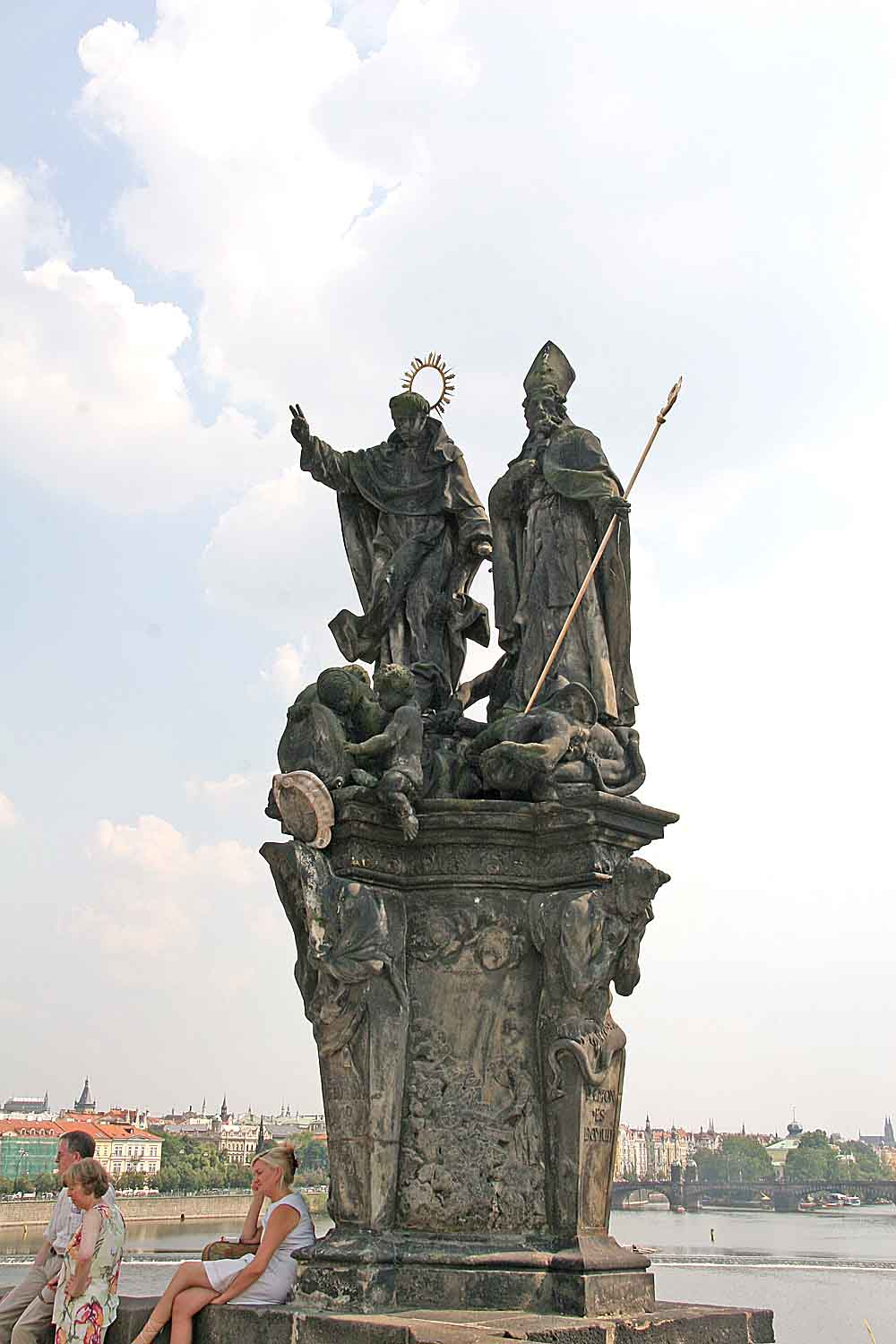
- The statues in 2006
- Artist: Ferdinand Brokoff
- Subject: Saint Vincent Ferrer; Saint Procopius of Sázava
- Location: Prague, Czech Republic

The statues of Saints Vincent Ferrer and Procopius (Czech: Sousoší svatých Vincence Ferrerského a Prokopa) are outdoor sculptures of Saint Vincent Ferrer and Saint Procopius of Sázava by Ferdinand Brokoff, installed on the south side of the Charles Bridge in Prague, Czech Republic.
