= John of Matha =

French priest and saint (1160–1213)

Saint John of Matha OSsT
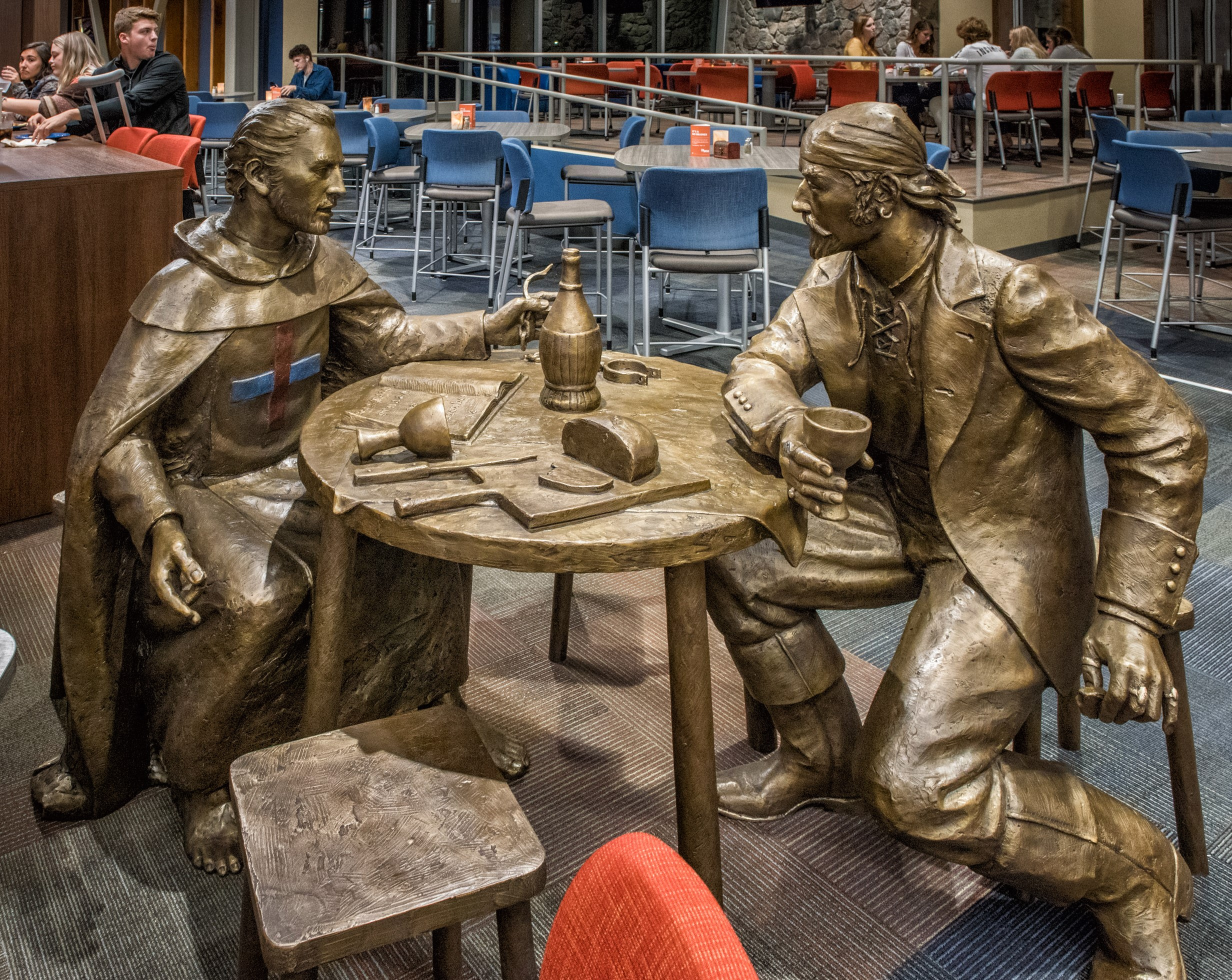
- A statue of Saint John of Matha discussing freedom from slavery and sin with a pirate in the University of Mary's Crow's Nest Campus Restaurant.

Confessor; Founder of the Trinitarians
- Born: 23 June 1160; Faucon-de-Barcelonnette, Provence (now France)
- Died: 17 December 1213 (aged 53); Rome, Papal States
- Venerated in: Catholic Church
- Canonized: Cultus confirmed 21 October 1666 by Pope Alexander VII
- Feast: 17 December (Ordinary Form); 8 February (Extraordinary Form)
- Attributes: purse, man in Trinitarian habit, with the white with blue and red cross on the breast, with chains in his hands or at his feet, captives near him, and his mitre at his feet

John of Matha OSsT (23 June 1160 – 17 December 1213) was a French Catholic priest and co-founder of the Order of the Most Holy Trinity, initially dedicated to ransoming Christians who had been captured by marauders from North Africa.

== Background ==
Between the eighth and the 15th centuries, Medieval Europe was in a state of intermittent warfare between the Christian kingdoms of Southern Europe and the Muslim polities of North Africa, Southern France, Sicily and portions of Spain. According to James William Brodman, the threat of capture or kidnapping, either by Muslim pirates or coastal raiders, or during one of the region's intermittent wars, was a continual concern for residents of Catalonia, Languedoc, and other coastal provinces of mediaeval Christian Europe. Raids by Muslim bands and armies was a near-annual occurrence.

The redemption of captives is listed among the corporal works of mercy. The period of the Crusades, during which so many Christians were in danger of falling into the hands of Muslims, witnessed the rise of religious orders vowed exclusively to this pious work.

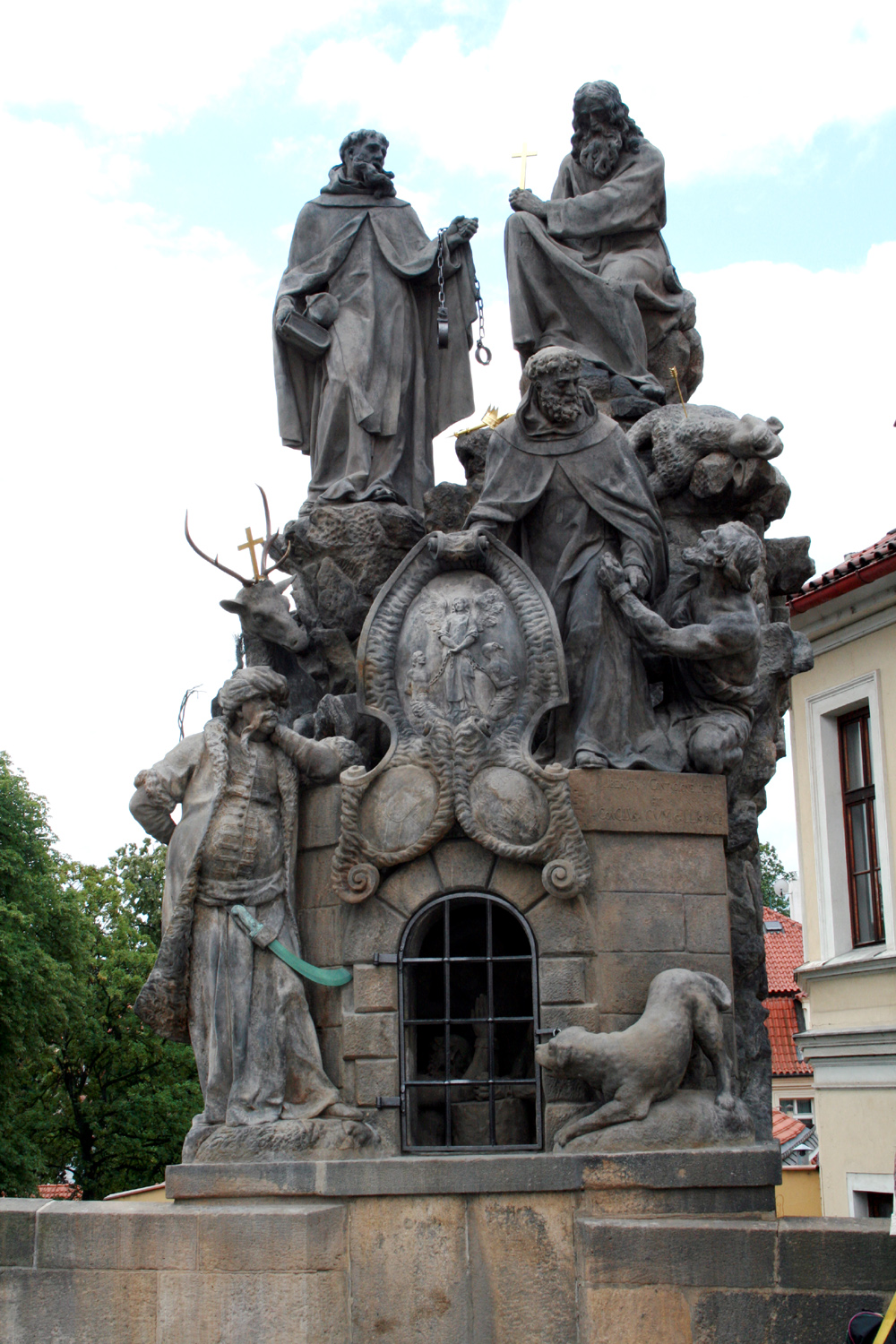
Statues of John of Matha, Felix of Valois and Saint Ivan, on the Charles Bridge, Prague.

== Life and work ==
Most of the story of John of Matha's life is based on legends that circulated after his death. It is reasonably certain that he was born to noble parents Euphemius and Martha at Faucon-de-Barcelonnette, on the borders of Provence on 23 June 1169. He was baptised as John, in honour of John the Baptist. His father Euphemius sent him to Aix-en-Provence, where he learned grammar, fencing, riding, and other skills fit for a young nobleman. It is said that while there, he gave the poor a considerable part of the money his parents sent him, and he visited the hospital every Friday to assist the penniless sick.

He studied theology at the University of Paris and was ordained a priest at the age of 32 in December 1192. According to Trinitarian tradition, John celebrated his first Mass on 28 January 1193. During that Mass, he had a vision of Christ holding by the hand two chained captives, one a Moor, the other a Christian (the Crusades were in full force at the time). The Christian captive carried a staff with a red and blue cross. After the Mass, John decided to devote himself to the task of ransoming Christian captives from the Moors. Before entering upon this work, he thought it needful to spend some time in retirement, prayer, and mortification; having heard of the holy hermit Felix of Valois, who lived in a great wood near Gandelu in the Diocese of Meaux, he went to him and requested instruction in the practice of perfection.

== Order of the Most Holy Trinity ==
One day while walking with Felix, John had another vision—a white stag appeared at a stream with a red and blue cross between its antlers. John disclosed to Felix the plans inspired by the vision during his first Mass of succouring captive Christians under slavery, and Felix offered his help to carry it out. They set out for Rome in the severe winter of 1197, to obtain the Pope's approval.

Emblem of the Trinitarian Order

On 17 December 1198, they obtained the preliminary approval of Pope Innocent III for a new order dedicated in honour of the Blessed Trinity for the redemption of Christian captives. The Order was fully approved in 1209; its first monastery was established at Cerfroid north of Paris (at the site of Felix’s old hermitage), and the second in Rome at the Church of San Tommaso in Formis. Christian slaves were first rescued by the Order in 1201. In 1202 and 1210, John travelled to Tunisia himself and brought back countless Christian slaves.

Before his death, Trinitarian tradition says he met Francis of Assisi and introduced Francis to the Frangipani family, who became benefactors of the Order of Friars Minor. John of Matha died on 17 December 1213 in Rome, in the house of Thomas In Formis on the Caelian Hill.

== Our Lady of Good Remedy ==
John founded the Trinitarians to visit slave markets, buy Christian slaves, and set them free in the name of the Holy Trinity. To do this, the Order needed large amounts of money, so they placed their fundraising efforts under the patronage of the Blessed Virgin Mary, the Mother of God. In gratitude for her assistance, John of Matha honored Mary with the title of "Our Lady of Good Remedy." Devotion to Mary under this ancient title is widely known in Europe and Latin America, and the Catholic Church celebrates her feast day on 8 October. Our Lady of Good Remedy is often depicted as the Virgin Mary handing a bag of money to John of Matha.

== Veneration ==
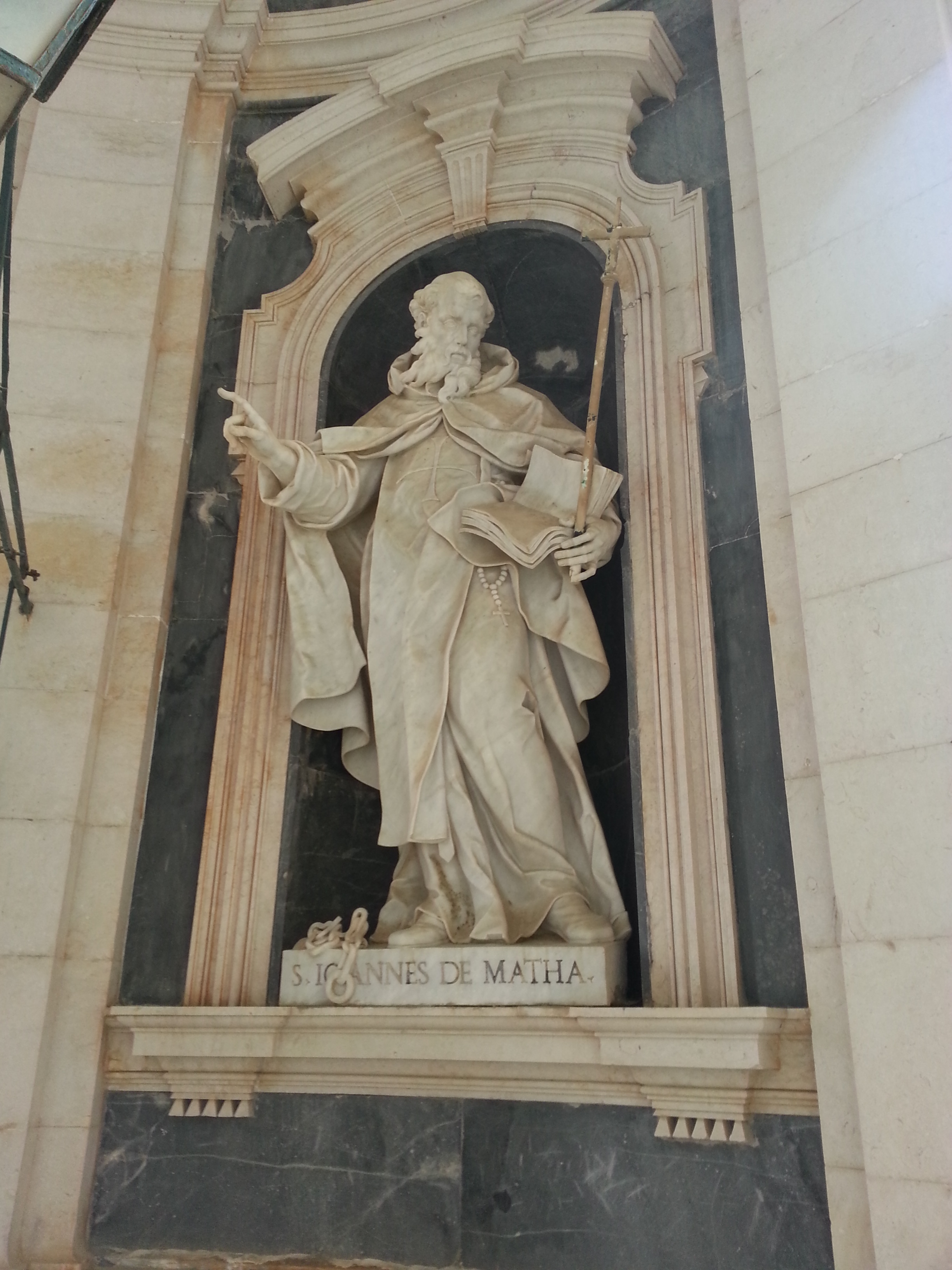
A statue of Saint John of Matha at the main entrance of Mafra Palace, Portugal

In 1655, his relics were translated from Rome to Madrid. His cultus was approved in 1665, and his feast day on the current General Roman Calendar is 17 December. Traditional Catholics that observe the Extraordinary Form of the Mass still observe his old feast day on 8 February.

== Legacy ==
The Order of the Most Holy Trinity is active on five continents and in many countries.

DeMatha Catholic High School located in Hyattsville, Maryland, US is named after him. It is also sponsored by the Trinitarians.

Saint-Jean-de-Matha is a village in the province of Quebec.

In 1865 American poet John Greenleaf Whittier composed an anti-slavery poem entitled "The Mantle of St. John De Matha".

== See also ==
- Felix of Valois
- List of ministers general of the Trinitarian Order

== Sources ==
- Holweck, F. G., A Biographical Dictionary of the Saints. 1924.
