= Devil's Furrow =

Ancient earthwork in the Czech Republic

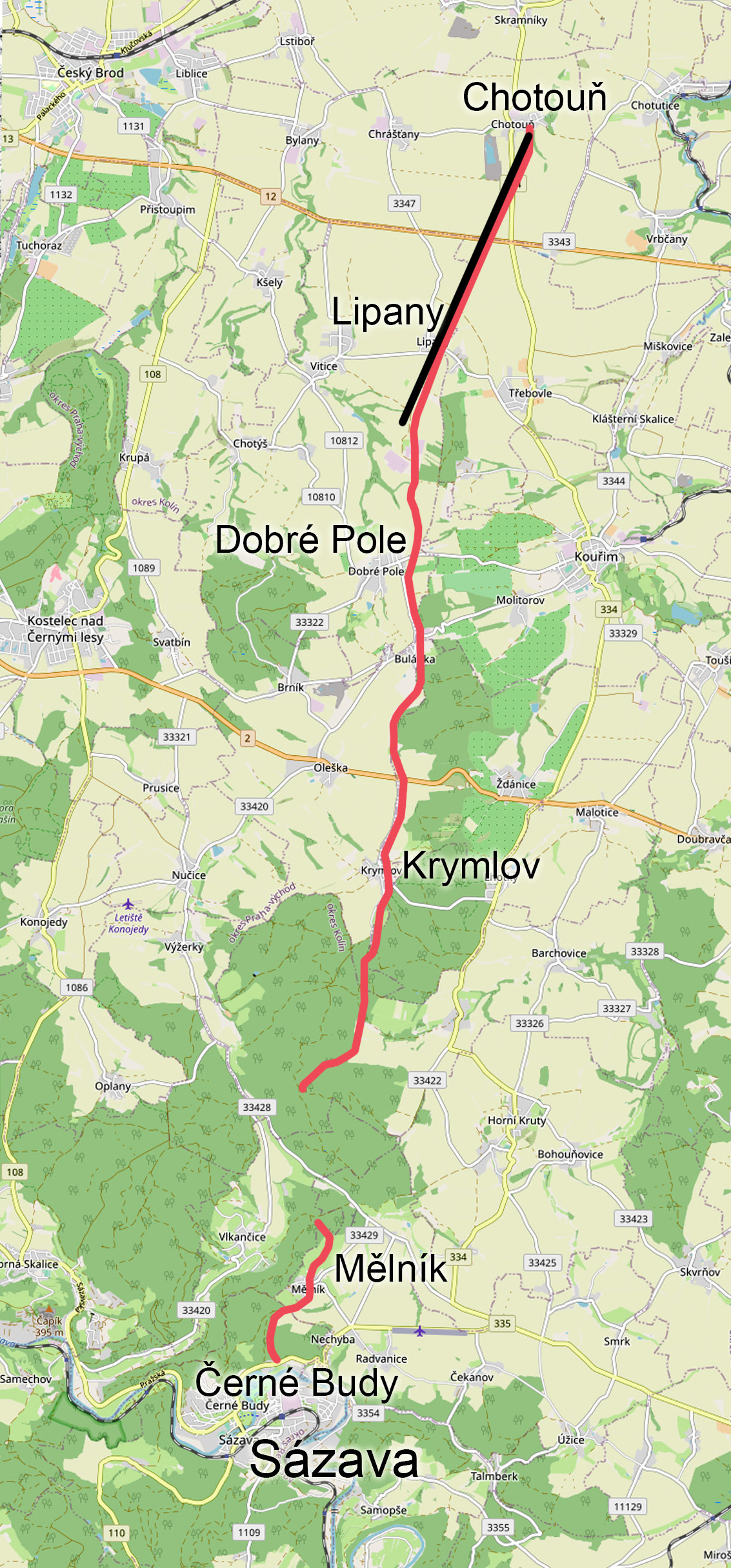
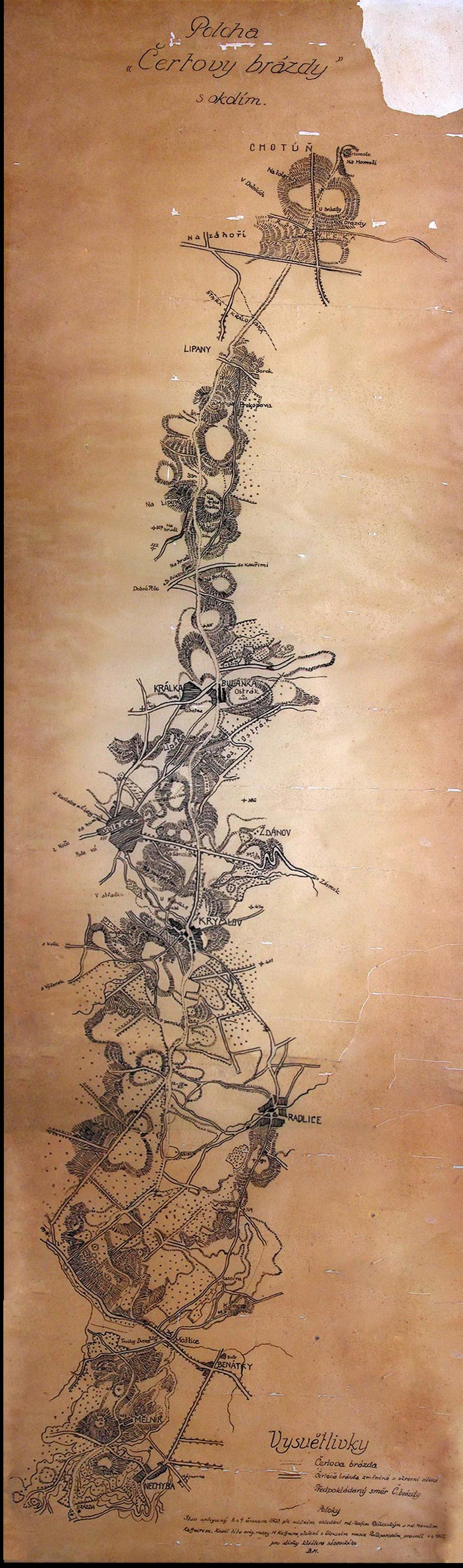
Left: The route of the Devil's Furrow between Chotouň and Sázava as recorded in 1903 by Miškovský and Kuffner. The black line marks the location of the discovered linear earthworks.
Right: The Devil's Wake on Hanuš Kuffner's map (9 June 1903)

According to an old Czech legend, the Devil's Furrow (Czech: Čertova brázda) was a distinct line in the landscape, allegedly connecting the place of St. Procopius's activity in Sázava Monastery with his birthplace, 21 km away in Chotouň. The furrow is no longer visible in the terrain, and the interpretation of the various relics found along its supposed route was a matter of debate.

Based on recent research, it appears that the foundation of the legend lies in a 5.5 km long (completely straight) linear earthwork (rampart with two ditches) that controlled a significant east–west transportation corridor in the early Middle Ages or earlier.

== Location ==
By the beginning of the twentieth century, the route of the Devil's Furrow was no longer visible in the terrain. Therefore, there is only indirect information about most of the route, mainly from the works of Jozef Miškovský and Hanuš Kuffner. It cannot be ruled out that this oral tradition recorded the routes of medieval pilgrimages along the paths of the legendary Devil's Furrow rather than the course of the possible Devil's Furrow itself.

František Borgia Krásl commented on the ambiguous course of the furrow in his book Sv. Prokop, jeho klášter a památka u lidu (1895). He wrote that much imagery is needed to find the path of the furrow.

The exception to this information deficit is the section of the furrow between Chotouň and Lipany. The Devil's Furrow is mentioned here in place names (such as on land cadastre maps), which is not found elsewhere along the assumed route. In addition, due to the fact that the Battle of Lipany took place in this area, descriptions of the battlefield are available, which preserve valuable information about the state and progress of the furrow. This section the Devil's Furrow differs in direction from the rest.

According to the maps and description of Miskovský and Kuffner, the furrow started at the eastern edge of Chotouň. It started from the slope below the preserved Mound of Chotouň and led straight to the top of Lipany Mountain, from where it turns to the south.

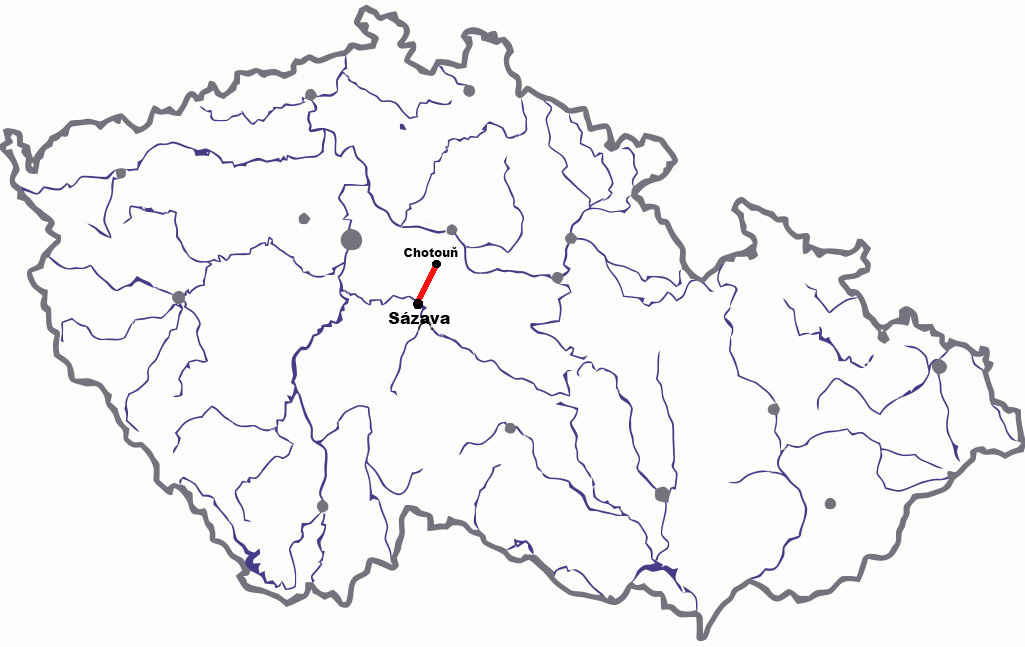
The location of the Devil's Furrow on the map of the Czech Republic

View across the village of Lipany towards Chotouň. The axis of the Devil's Furrow is shown by the road and the boundaries of the fields.

In his work from 1903, Jozef Miškovský describes the deeply incised road – the Devil's Furrow – between Chotouň and Lipany as follows: "The road to Lipská near Chotouň is narrowed into a footpath, but before long it continues all the way to Lipany, but with different measures of its depth and matches. From the Chotouň road itself, the path is 4 to 5 m wide and in places about 2.5 m deep, below the Lipany ravine it is 5 to 5.5 m deep and 15 to 16 m wide. From there it is a straight line to the burial mound of Prokop Holý and along the western slope of the Lipský ridge it stretches fairly straight to Dobré Pole, above which it crosses the new district road."

Before it was leveled by farmers in the 1950s, the furrow here had the form described by Miškovský. On the northeastern edge of Lipany, where the furrow could not be filled in because a local watercourse runs here, the ravine has remained respectable in size. In their work, for example, J. Bernat and M. Štědra comment on this. This section of the furrow was depicted by Marold in his painting Battle of Lipany.

From Lipany Mountain, the trail turns south along a dirt road. From there (according to Miškovský and Kuffner) the trail leads along local roads to Dobré Pole, Bulánka and Krymlov. Bernat and Štědra offer several parallel routes, for which they find compelling features, especially in the form of detours in wooded sections. From Krymlov, the trail (according to Miškovský) leads along roads and forest paths before disappearing by Moštice. It reappears just south of the village of Mělník, from where it turns in an arc to the west and descends the slope along a wide road towards Sázava.

According to legend, the Devil's Furrow ended north of the town of Sázava, in an area called Černé Budy above the Votočnice meadow. A marked tourist route from the Sázava Monastery also leads here. The tourist entrance to the furrow is marked with an imitation of the "Devil's Plow". From there, a footpath with a modern Stations of the Cross climbs steeply up the slope.

However, precisely in this section, which is currently the only one directly connected to the Devil's Furrow, it is no longer the route recorded by Miškovský and Kuffner. The tourist-marked entrance to the furrow is located approximately 100 meters from the original route. Visitors who set out on the tourist-marked "wake" - a footpath with the Stations of the Cross - are in the wrong place, with no indication of what the wake may have looked like.

== Research history ==
The first written mention of the Devil's Wake is given at the beginning of the seventeenth century by Pontanus of Breitenberg in his collection of church songs.

In 1903, Jozef Miškovský, a former employee of the Podlipanske Museum in Český Brod, and his friend, journalist and military topographer Hanuš Kuffner, noticed that there were no traces of the Devil's Furrow in many places in the landscape, and decided to describe the route according to the accounts of eyewitnesses.

In Kuffner's book Bitva u Lipan 30. května 1434 (1899), the furrow is mentioned in the description of the battlefield: "Besides, the so-called 'Devil's Furrow' is particularly noteworthy... it starts at the river Sázava and runs along the edge of the battlefield itself, in a north-easterly direction towards Chotouň, where it ends at a mound and a now dry oak. Originally, it was probably a uniformly deep ditch, but it was plowed up, filled in, and over time overgrown so that today, although it can be traced along its entire length, it is only deeper in places, as, for example, near Lipany. On the Lipany Mountain itself, the 'Devil's Furrow' is really only a tiny furrow today, otherwise many moments indicate that the furrow was still a fairly deep ditch at the time and thus a significant obstacle for chariot troops."

In 2003, Jiří Bernat and Milan Štědra brought attention to the Devil's Wake. Through field research in the area between Chotouň and Sázava, they found a number of locations which they interpreted as alternative sections of the furrow not noticed by Miškovský and Kuffner. They interpreted the furrow as an old north–south trail with a number of parallel branches.

The work of Bernat and Štědra was followed ten years later by Čestmír Štuka and Petr Nový, who investigated the route of the furrow especially in the vicinity of Lipany Mountain using newly available remote sensing technologies. They continued their research in 2021.

== Interpretation ==
=== The work of St. Procopius and the devil ===
The most famous interpretation is the legend of how Saint Procopius plowed the furrow with a demon. Procopius is a historical figure from the turn of the first millennium A.D. His life connects Chotouň (place of birth) and Sázava (where he worked and died), similar to the Devil's Wake.

The tale goes that a demon provoked the saint. However, not wanting to fight, Procopius harnessed the demon and yoked it to a plow, propelling it with the cross in his right hand. He plowed a furrow with it to his native village, where he knocked the dirt from the plow. According to the legend, this is how the Devil's Furrow and the mound at its end in Chotouň was created.

Jan František Beckovský, in the second part of Poselkyně starých příběhův českých, describes the legendary plowing of the furrow in more detail, "... when St. Procopius harnessed the evil spirit in his cave in Sázava to a horse, and rode with him from that cave through forests, through plains, hills, and valleys directly across the road or wagon road, which is used to walk and drive from Prague to Kolín, all the way to the village of Chotouň, and on that hill of Chotouň forced the evil spirit to scrape off the mud or greasy earth from the earth from which the hill was made at that time, and which can be seen from the Prague road today..."

František Jan Vavák furthers the legend in the numbered description of the map of the Lipany battlefield from 1788: "The village of Chotouň, the homeland of St. Procopius... there is a furrow in the form of a trench from St. Procopius driven by evil spirits to the Sázava monastery."

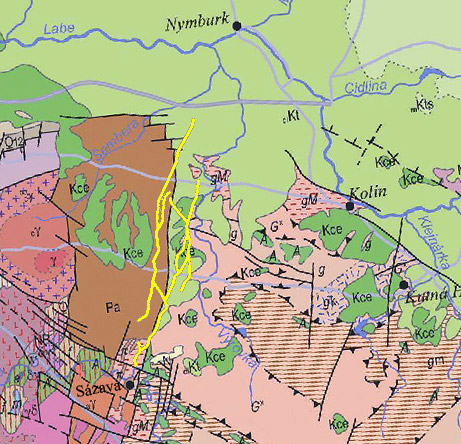
The system of routes of the Devil's Wake (according to Bernat and Štědra) plotted on a map with the Kouřim fault

=== Geological phenomenon ===
The furrow has been interpreted by some authors as a surface manifestation of a geological fault. This interpretation is supported by the fact that the Kouřim fault, belonging to the greater Blanická fault, runs through the landscape parallel to the wake. Geological surveys, however, have suggested that the Devil's Furrow is a surface phenomenon with no connection to faults in deeper layers.

=== Prehistoric trail ===
The interpretation of the furrow as a remnant of a prehistoric trail is compelling, because the route corresponds to the knowledge about the management of prehistoric trails described by geologist Radan Květ in his book Staré stezky v proměnách věků. According to Květ, the management of old paths in the landscape follows the network of faults in the Earth's crust and the hydrographic network, which determine the topography of the landscape. It is the Devil's Wake that runs along the Kouřim fault and connects the fords on the Sázava and the Elbe by a direct route, without crossing other important watercourses. This is a typical example of the natural direction of an old path in the countryside. During a thorough field survey, Bernat and Štědra found a large number of massive drifts, in many cases parallel to the legendary wake direction, which indicate significant traffic in the north–south direction.

However, the topography of the furrow does not lend itself to being an efficient trail along its entire course; the traditional descent of the furrow to Sázava has a slope of more than 30% in some places. If it was a carriageway, this section would be difficult to traverse.

=== Boundary ===
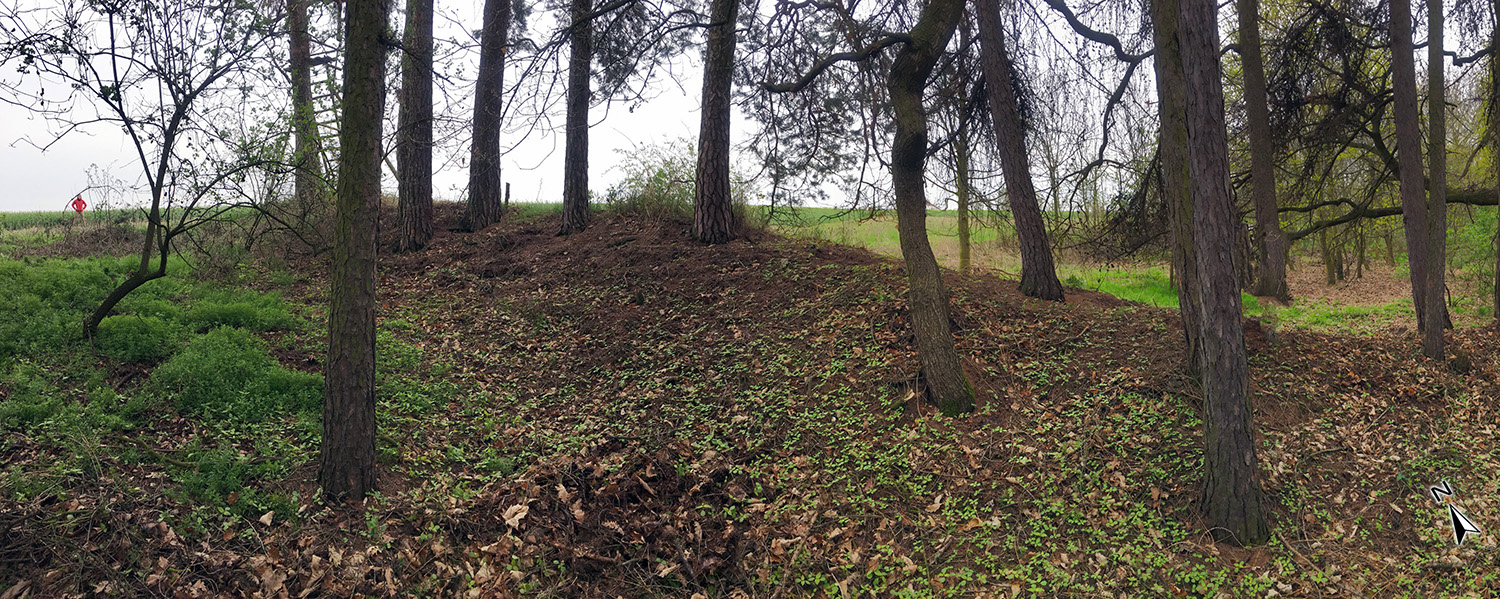
A well-preserved rampart with shallow ditches – the remains of a linear construction along the route of the Devil's Furrow on Lipany Mountain

The opinion that the furrow could be some kind of border appears repeatedly in a number of authors.

Advances in remote sensing methods, especially the use of Lidar, have made it possible to reveal a 5.5 km long linear embankment with trenches in the route of the Devil's Furrow on Lipany Mountain. The survey was based on the study of an unusually direct portion of the furrow between Lipany and Chotouň.

At the southern end of this linear portion, a well-preserved remnant of a rampart accompanied by two shallow ditches on the sides was discovered in a wooded ravine. The earthworks show a number of similarities with some linear structures known from abroad: for example Offa's Dyke or Danevirke. According to the authors, it could have had a similar function and role as its foreign counterparts, i.e. restricting the movement of people and goods and symbolically expressing power.
