= Statue of Francis Borgia, Charles Bridge =

Statue in Prague, Czech Republic

Statue of Francis Borgia
- Sousoší svatého Františka Borgiáše (Czech)
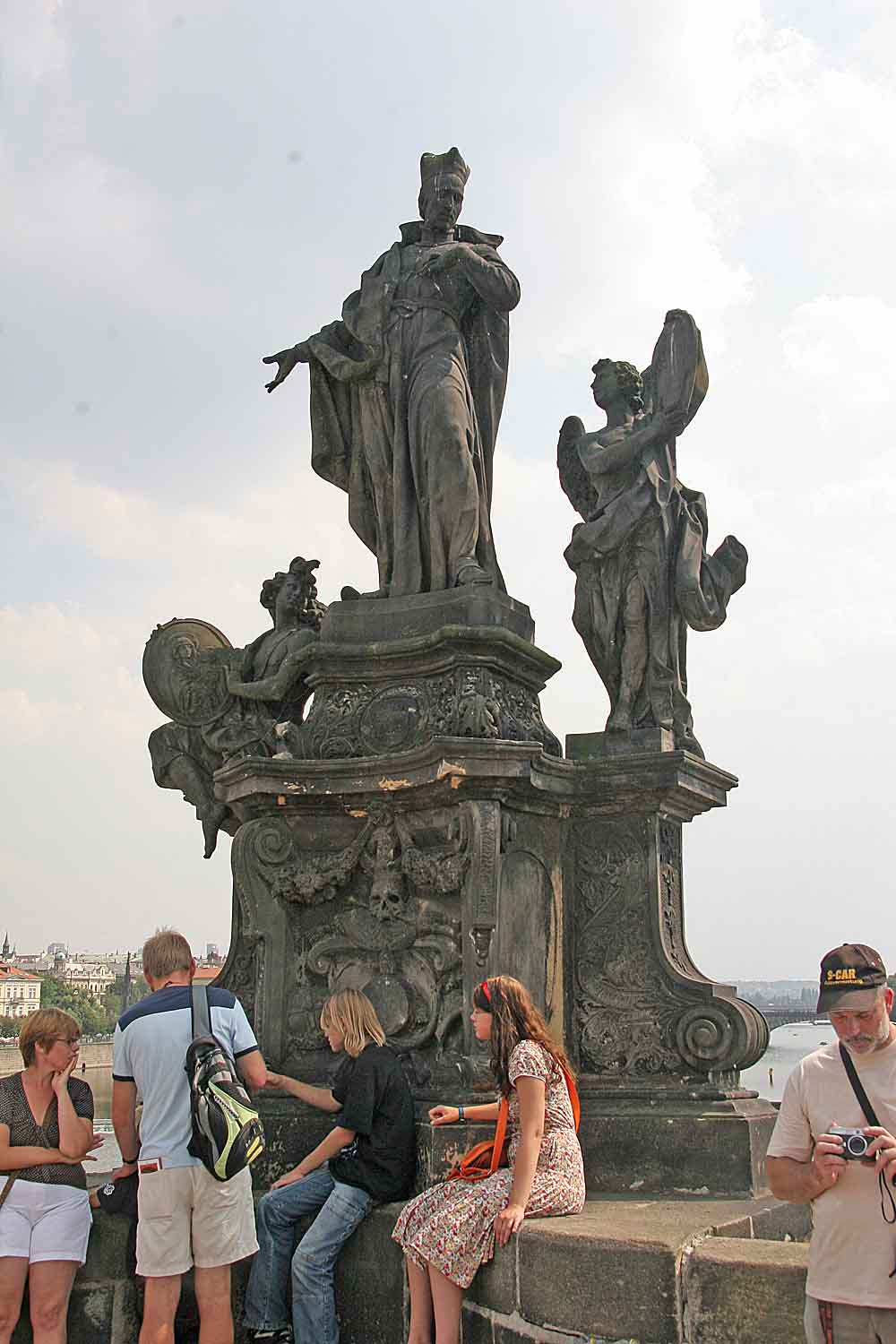
- The statue in 2006
- Artist: Ferdinand Brokoff
- Type: Sculpture
- Subject: Francis Borgia
- Location: Prague, Czech Republic; 50°05′11″N 14°24′38″E

A statue of Francis Borgia (Czech: Sousoší svatého Františka Borgiáše) by Ferdinand Brokoff is installed on the south side of the Charles Bridge in Prague, Czech Republic.
