= Statue of Saint Cajetan, Charles Bridge =

Statue in Prague, Czech Republic

Coordinates: 50°05′13″N 14°24′31″E

Statue of Saint Cajetan
- Socha svatého Kajetána (Czech)
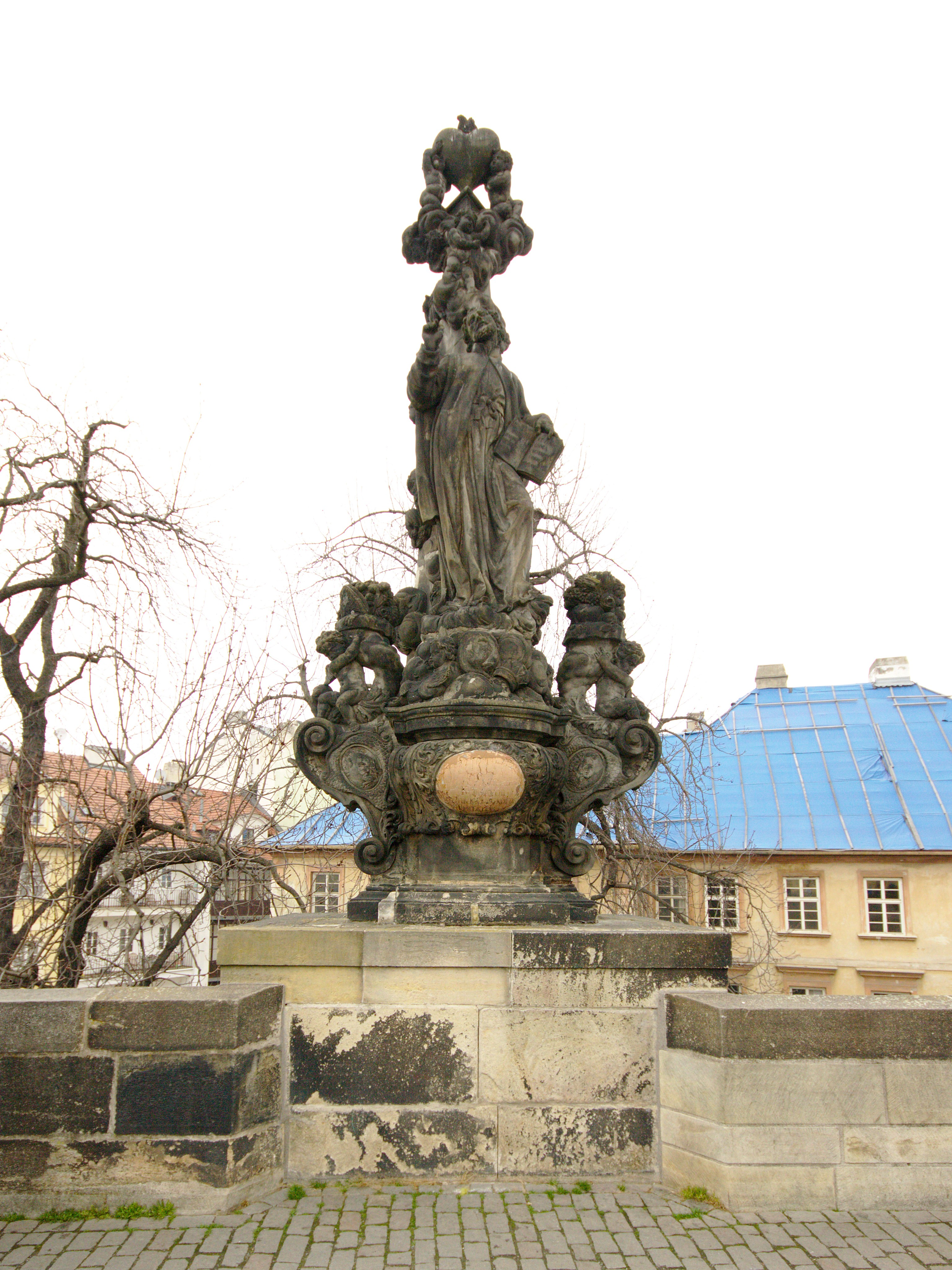
- The sculpture in 2014
- Artist: Ferdinand Brokoff
- Subject: Saint Cajetan
- Location: Prague, Czech Republic

The statue of Saint Cajetan (Czech: Socha svatého Kajetána) is an outdoor sculpture by Ferdinand Brokoff, installed on the north side of the Charles Bridge in Prague, Czech Republic.
