= Statue of Francis Xavier, Charles Bridge =

Statue in Prague, Czech Republic

Statue of Francis Xavier
- Sousoší svatého Františka Xaverského (Czech)
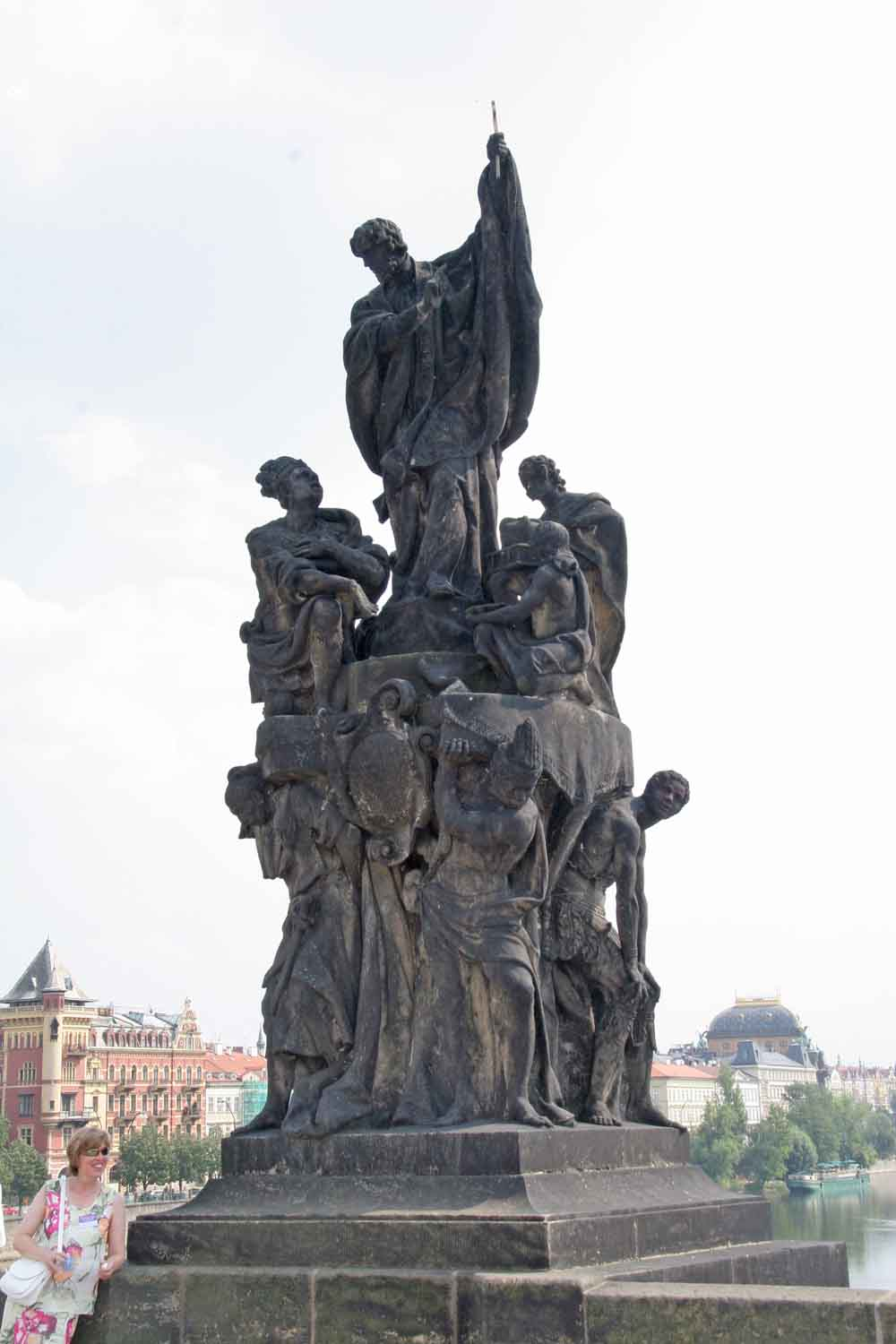
- The statue in 2006
- Artist: Ferdinand Brokoff
- Type: Sculpture
- Subject: Francis Xavier
- Location: Prague, Czech Republic; 50°05′11″N 14°24′41″E

A statue of Francis Xavier (Czech: Sousoší svatého Františka Xaverského) by Ferdinand Brokoff is installed on the south side of the Charles Bridge in Prague, Czech Republic.
