= Pivkovice =

- Municipality
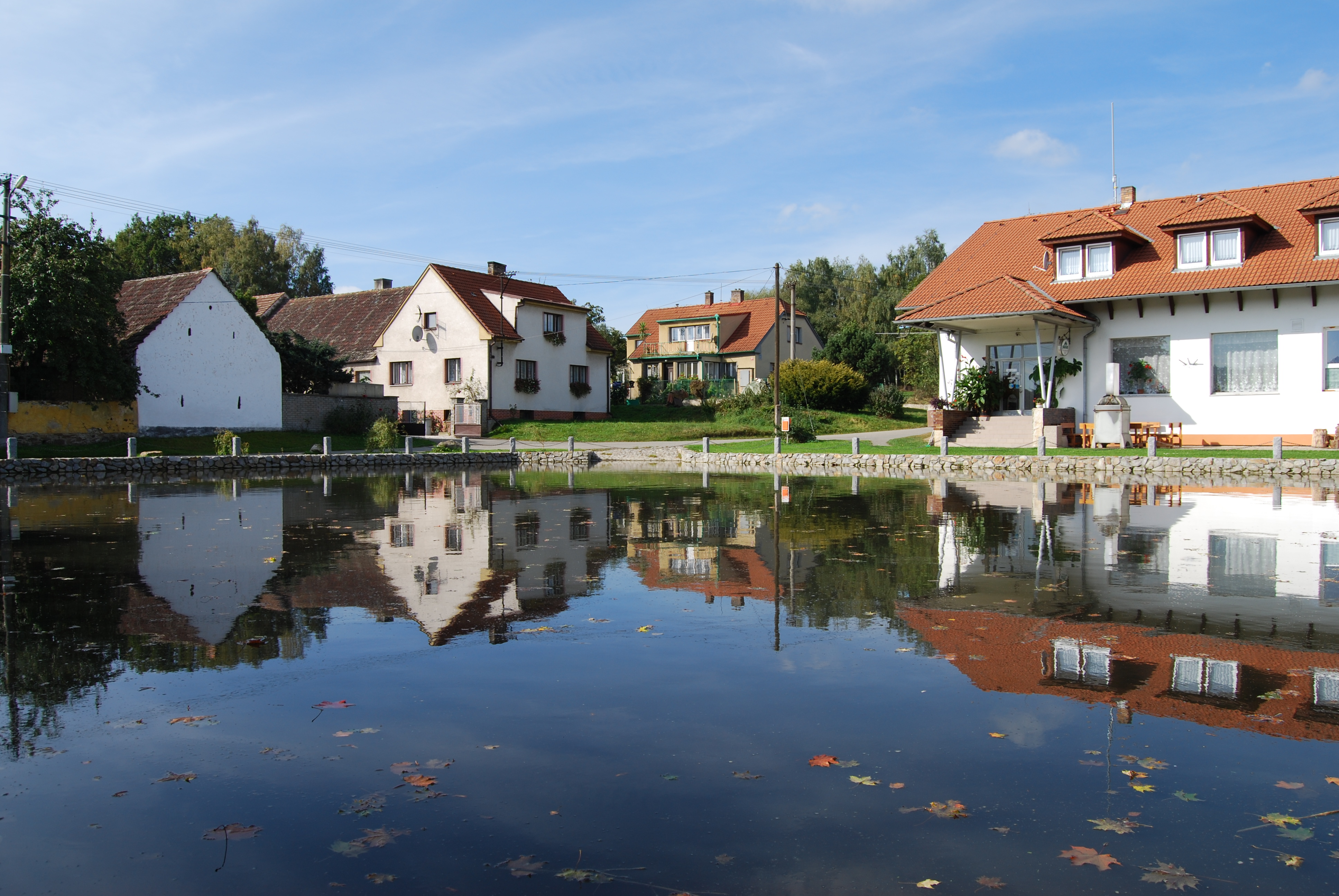
- Centre of Pivkovice

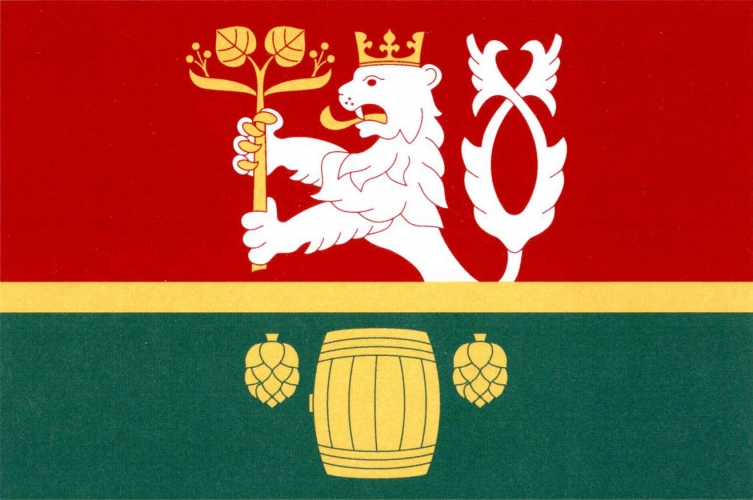
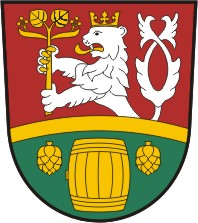
- Flag Coat of arms

- Location in the Czech Republic
- Coordinates: 49°10′39″N 14°4′11″E
- Country: Czech Republic
- Region: South Bohemian
- District: Strakonice
- First mentioned: 1358

Area
  - Total: 3.17 km^{2} (1.22 sq mi)
- Elevation: 513 m (1,683 ft)

Population (2026-01-01)
  - Total: 86
  - Density: 27/km^{2} (70/sq mi)
- Time zone: UTC+1 (CET)
  - Summer (DST): UTC+2 (CEST)
- Postal code: 387 73
- Website: www.pivkovice.cz

Pivkovice is a municipality and village in Strakonice District in the South Bohemian Region of the Czech Republic. It has about 90 inhabitants.

Pivkovice lies approximately 16 kilometres (10 mi) south-east of Strakonice, 37 km (23 mi) north-west of České Budějovice, and 105 km (65 mi) south of Prague.

== Administrative division ==
Pivkovice consists of two municipal parts (in brackets population according to the 2021 census):

- Pivkovice (64)
- Chrást (18)

== Demographics ==
Historical population
Year	Pop.	±%
1869	194	—
1880	200	+3.1%
1890	182	−9.0%
1900	172	−5.5%
1910	167	−2.9%
1921	180	+7.8%
1930	166	−7.8%
1950	124	−25.3%
1961	126	+1.6%
1970	121	−4.0%
1980	115	−5.0%
1991	87	−24.3%
2001	75	−13.8%
2011	80	+6.7%
2021	82	+2.5%
Source: Censuses
