= Dolní Krupá (Havlíčkův Brod District) =

- Municipality
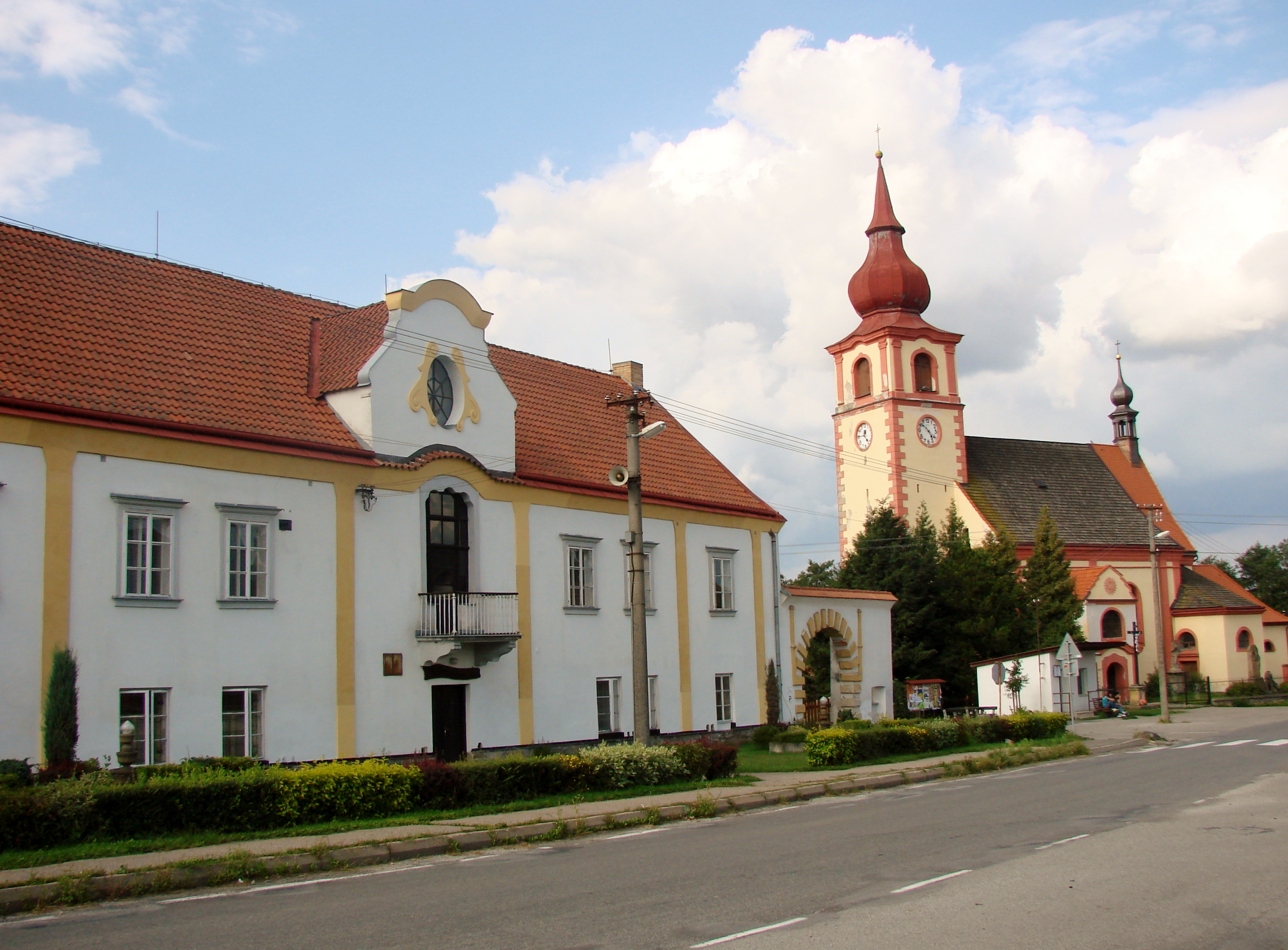
- Chateau and the Church of Saint Vitus

- Flag Coat of arms

- Location in the Czech Republic
- Coordinates: 49°39′38″N 15°36′11″E
- Country: Czech Republic
- Region: Vysočina
- District: Havlíčkův Brod
- First mentioned: 1283

Area
  - Total: 7.92 km^{2} (3.06 sq mi)
- Elevation: 471 m (1,545 ft)

Population (2026-01-01)
  - Total: 443
  - Density: 55.9/km^{2} (145/sq mi)
- Time zone: UTC+1 (CET)
  - Summer (DST): UTC+2 (CEST)
- Postal codes: 580 01, 582 71
- Website: www.dolnikrupa.cz

Dolní Krupá (Czech pronunciation: [ˈdolɲiː ˈkrupaː]; German: Unter Kraupen) is a municipality and village in Havlíčkův Brod District in the Vysočina Region of the Czech Republic. It has about 400 inhabitants.

Dolní Krupá lies approximately 7 kilometres (4 mi) north of Havlíčkův Brod, 30 km (19 mi) north of Jihlava, and 98 km (61 mi) south-east of Prague.

== Administrative division ==
Dolní Krupá consists of two municipal parts (in brackets population according to the 2021 census):

- Dolní Krupá (378)
- Chrast (27)

== Demographics ==
Historical population
Year	Pop.	±%
1869	758	—
1880	762	+0.5%
1890	742	−2.6%
1900	628	−15.4%
1910	674	+7.3%
1921	650	−3.6%
1930	573	−11.8%
1950	505	−11.9%
1961	521	+3.2%
1970	452	−13.2%
1980	400	−11.5%
1991	368	−8.0%
2001	347	−5.7%
2011	415	+19.6%
2021	405	−2.4%
Source: Censuses
