= Chrást (Příbram District) =

- Municipality
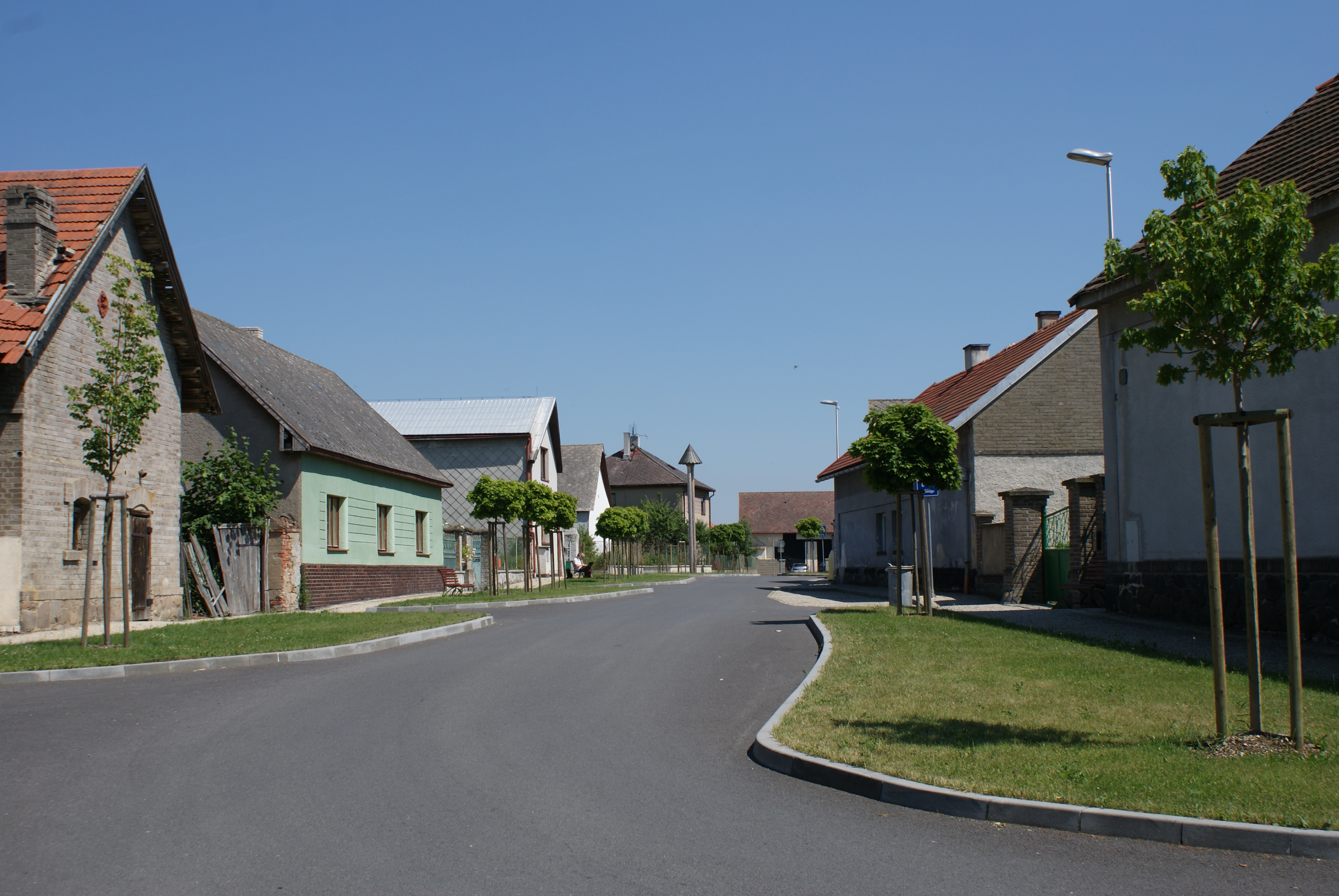
- Centre of Chrást

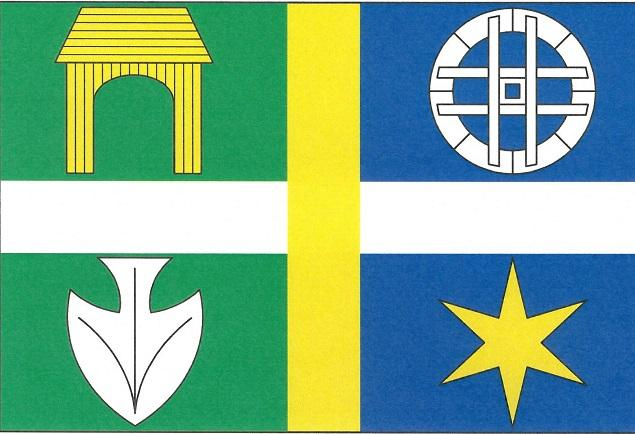
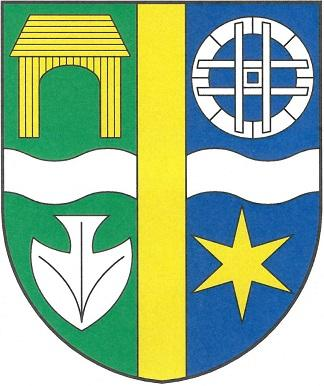
- Flag Coat of arms

- Location in the Czech Republic
- Coordinates: 49°35′41″N 13°57′21″E
- Country: Czech Republic
- Region: Central Bohemian
- District: Příbram
- First mentioned: 1379

Area
  - Total: 7.99 km^{2} (3.08 sq mi)
- Elevation: 507 m (1,663 ft)

Population (2026-01-01)
  - Total: 223
  - Density: 27.9/km^{2} (72.3/sq mi)
- Time zone: UTC+1 (CET)
  - Summer (DST): UTC+2 (CEST)
- Postal codes: 262 42, 262 72
- Website: www.chrast.net

Chrást is a municipality and village in Příbram District in the Central Bohemian Region of the Czech Republic. It has about 200 inhabitants.

== Administrative division ==
Chrást consists of four municipal parts (in brackets population according to the 2021 census):

- Chrást (111)
- Lisovice (47)
- Namnice (15)
- Oslí (21)

== Etymology ==
The name Chrást is a common Czech place name, meaning 'brushwood' or 'shrubs'.

== Demographics ==
Historical population
Year	Pop.	±%
1869	462	—
1880	512	+10.8%
1890	481	−6.1%
1900	467	−2.9%
1910	431	−7.7%
1921	393	−8.8%
1930	342	−13.0%
1950	251	−26.6%
1961	227	−9.6%
1970	240	+5.7%
1980	198	−17.5%
1991	201	+1.5%
2001	205	+2.0%
2011	195	−4.9%
2021	194	−0.5%
Source: Censuses
