= Ferdinand Brokoff =

Czech sculptor

Ferdinand Maxmilian Brokoff
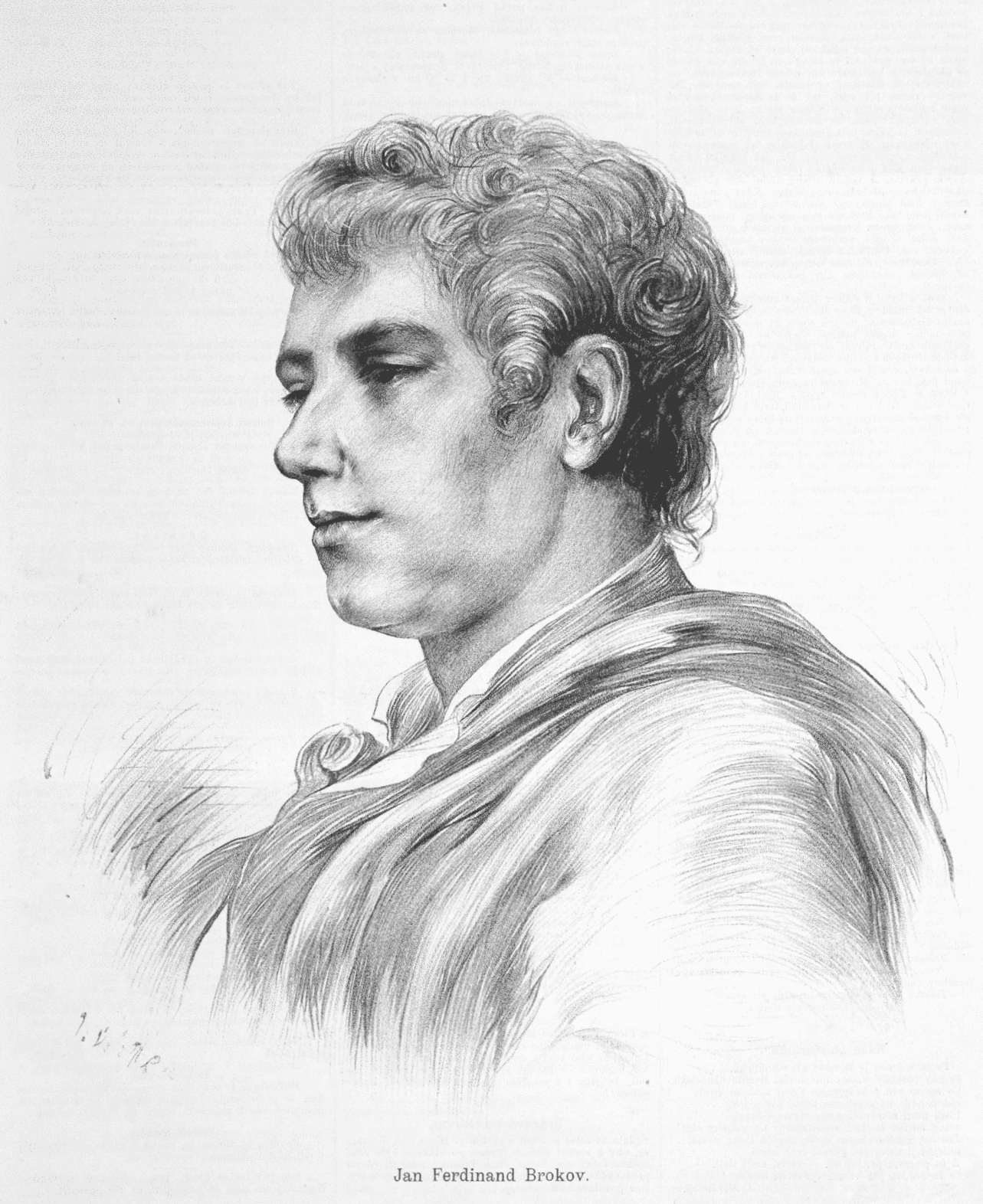
- Portrait of Ferdinand Brokoff by Jan Vilímek
- Born: 12 September 1688; Červený Hrádek, Bohemia
- Died: 8 March 1731 (aged 42); Prague, Bohemia
- Known for: Sculpture
- Notable work: Several statues on Charles Bridge in Prague
- Movement: Baroque

Ferdinand Maxmilian Brokoff (Czech: Ferdinand Maxmilián Brokoff; 12 September 1688 – 8 March 1731) was a Czech sculptor and carver of the Baroque era.

== Life and career ==
Brokoff was born in Červený Hrádek in the Kingdom of Bohemia (today part of Jirkov in the Czech Republic), the second son of Elisabeth and Jan Brokoff. Ferdinand Brokoff's work is often compared with the work of Matthias Braun. Initially he mostly helped his father, but from 1708 he worked independently and two years later, at the age of 22, he became known for his work on several statues on Charles Bridge in Prague, including the statuary of St. Adalbert, the statue of St. Gaetano, the sculpture group of Francis Borgia, the statues of St. Ignatius and Francis Xaverius, and the sculpture group of Saints John of Matha, Felix of Valois and Ivan which depicts in its lower section a dungeon in which emaciated Christians are guarded by a dog and a figure in Turkish costume.

Around 1714 Ferdinand Brokoff began working with the Austrian architect Johann Bernhard Fischer von Erlach and moved to Vienna (while still taking commissions from Prague) where he worked on the church of St. Charles Borromei. He was also active in Silesia (Wrocław), but had to return to Prague soon due to progressing tuberculosis. Nevertheless, he continued to sculpt in Prague and made some significant pieces during the 1720s, such as the monumental statuary and pillar at Hradčany Square in 1726. In 1722 he was also commissioned to create 13 pieces of the Calvary to put in the niches of the New Castle Stairway, a project that was never realized.

Towards the end of his life, the illness gradually prevented him from working alone, thus he only created the designs and models, and had them realized by his younger assistants. He died in Prague.

== Statues on the Charles Bridge ==
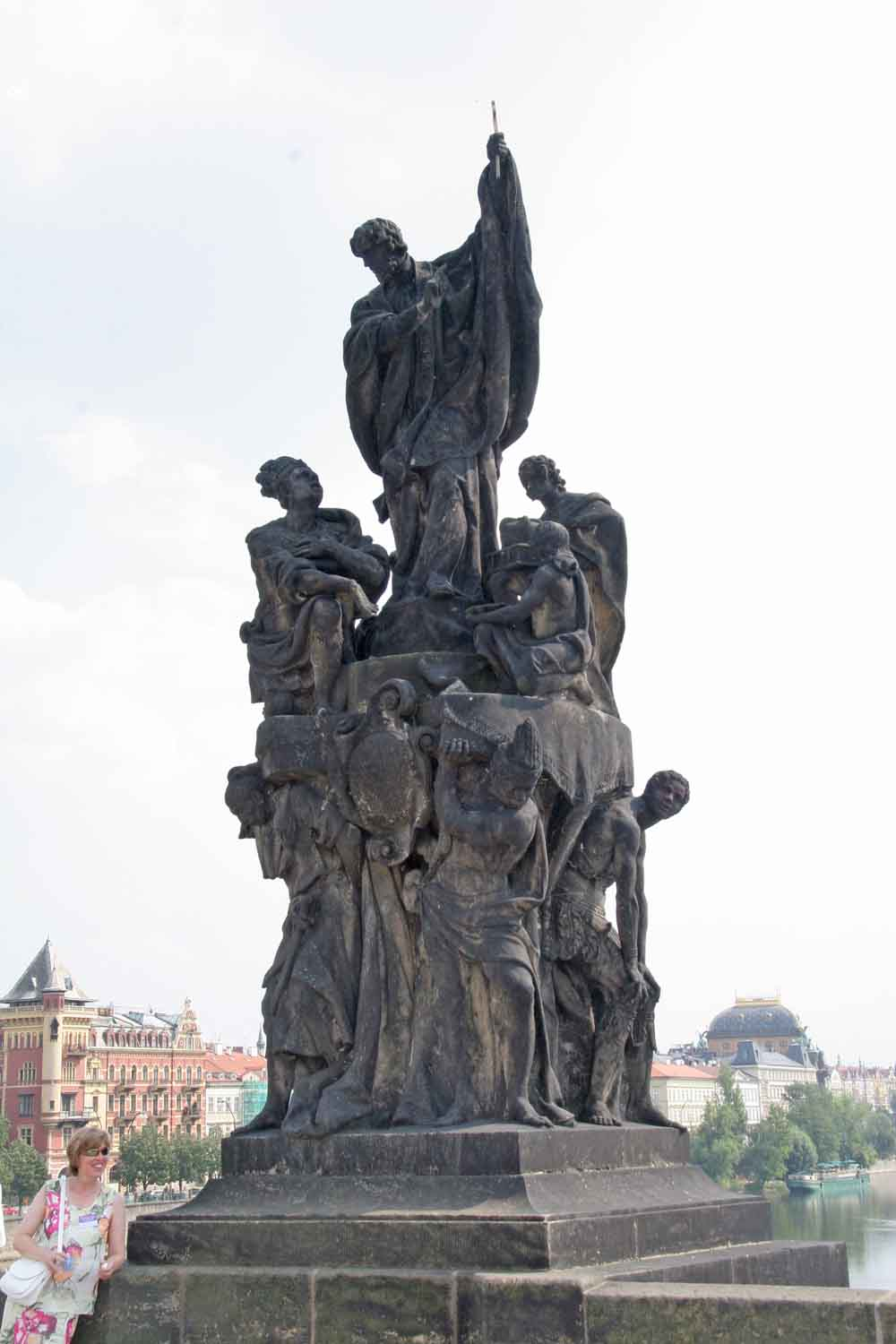
St. Francis Xavier

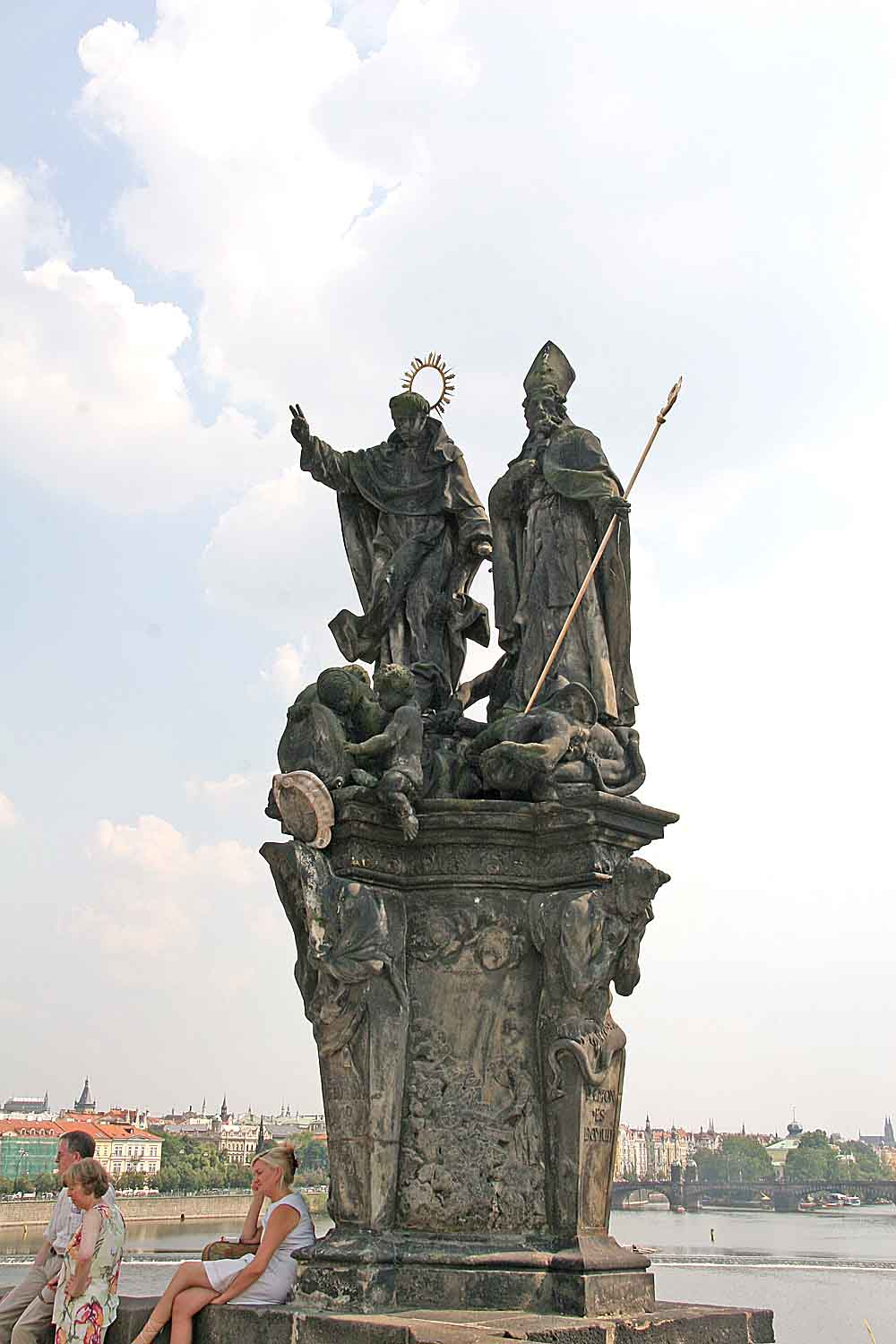
Sts. Vincent Ferrer and Procopius

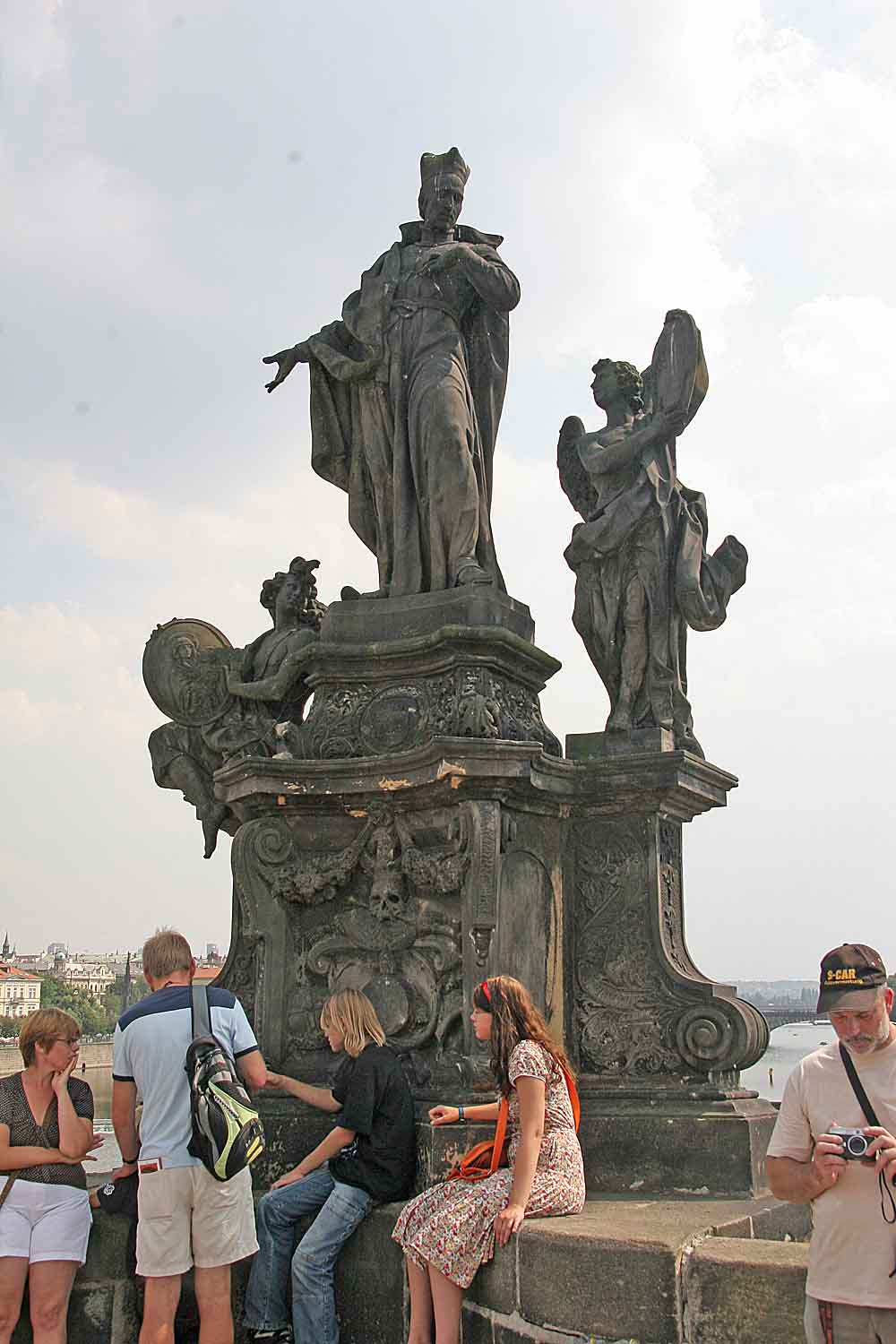
St. Francis Borgia

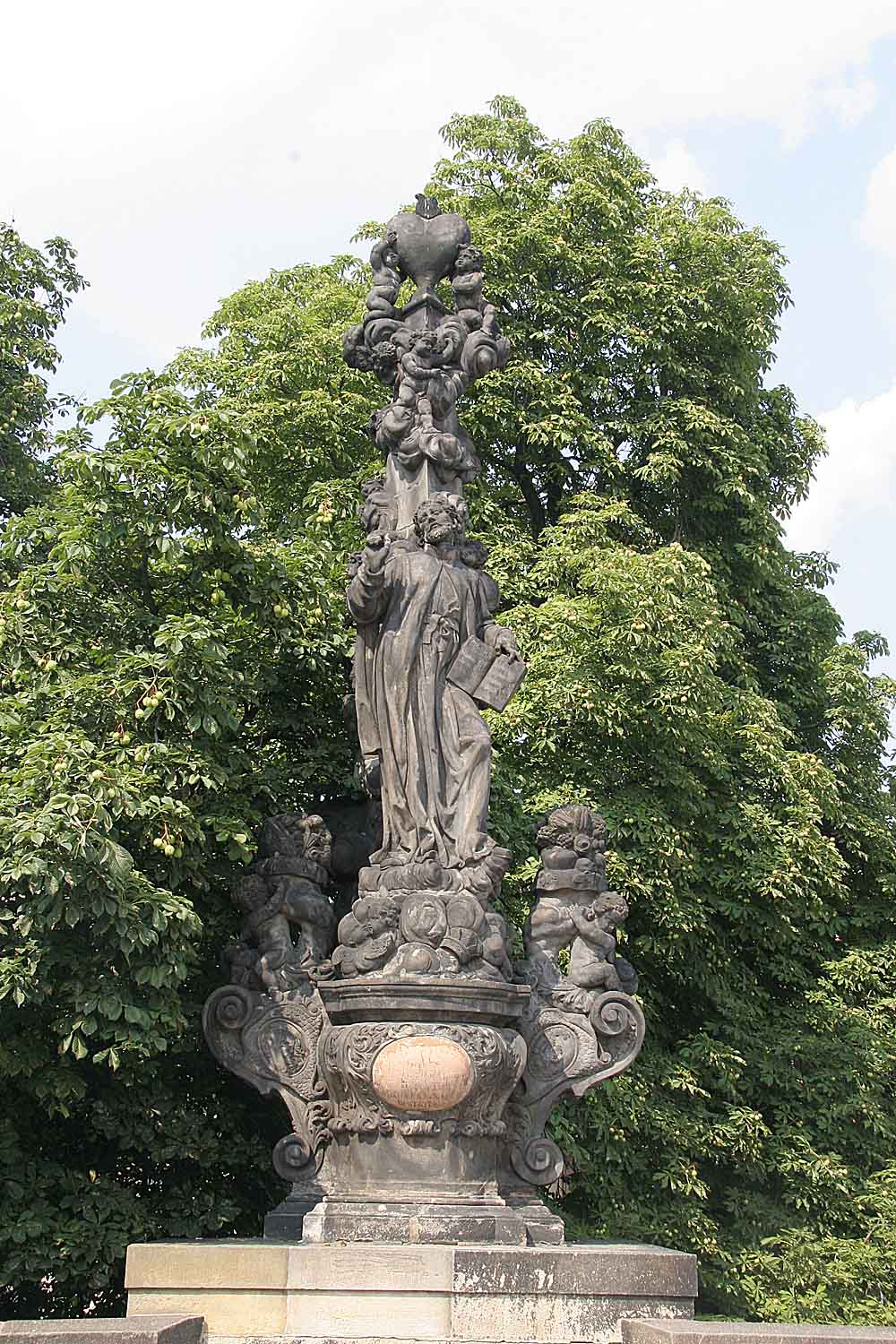
St. Cajetan

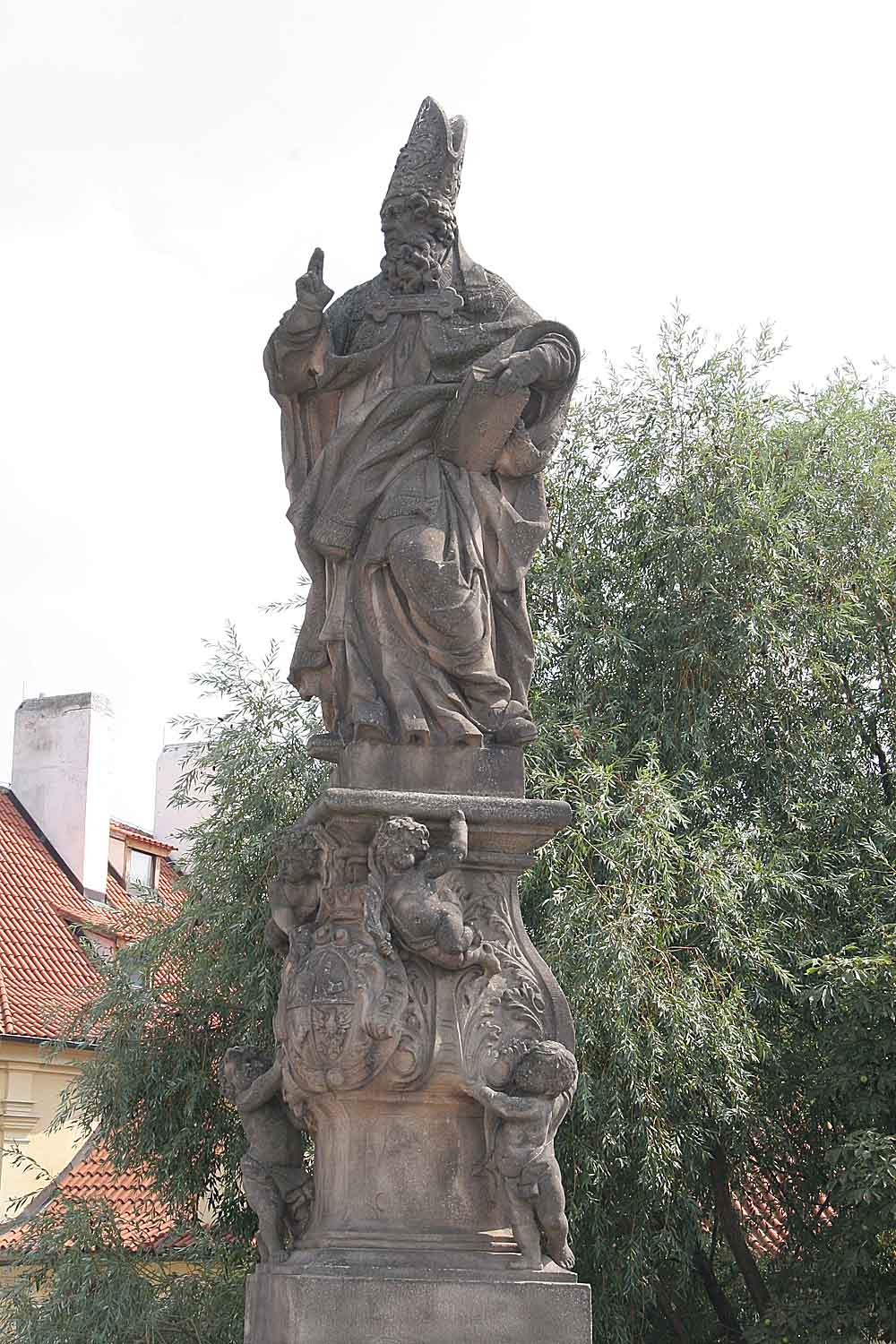
St. Adalbert

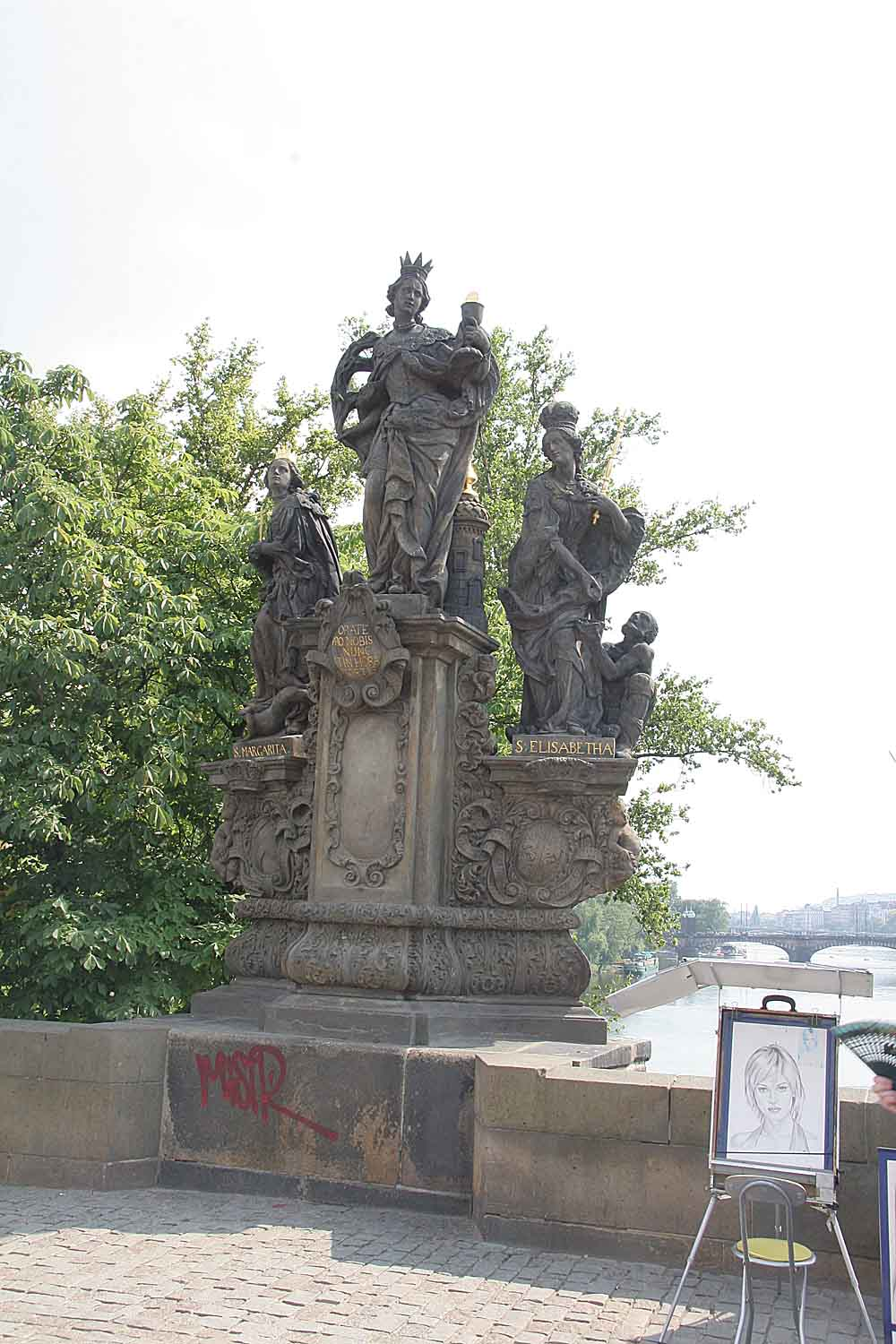
Sts. Barbara, Margaret and Elizabeth

== See also ==
- Statue of Vitus, Charles Bridge
