= Brumetz =

- Commune
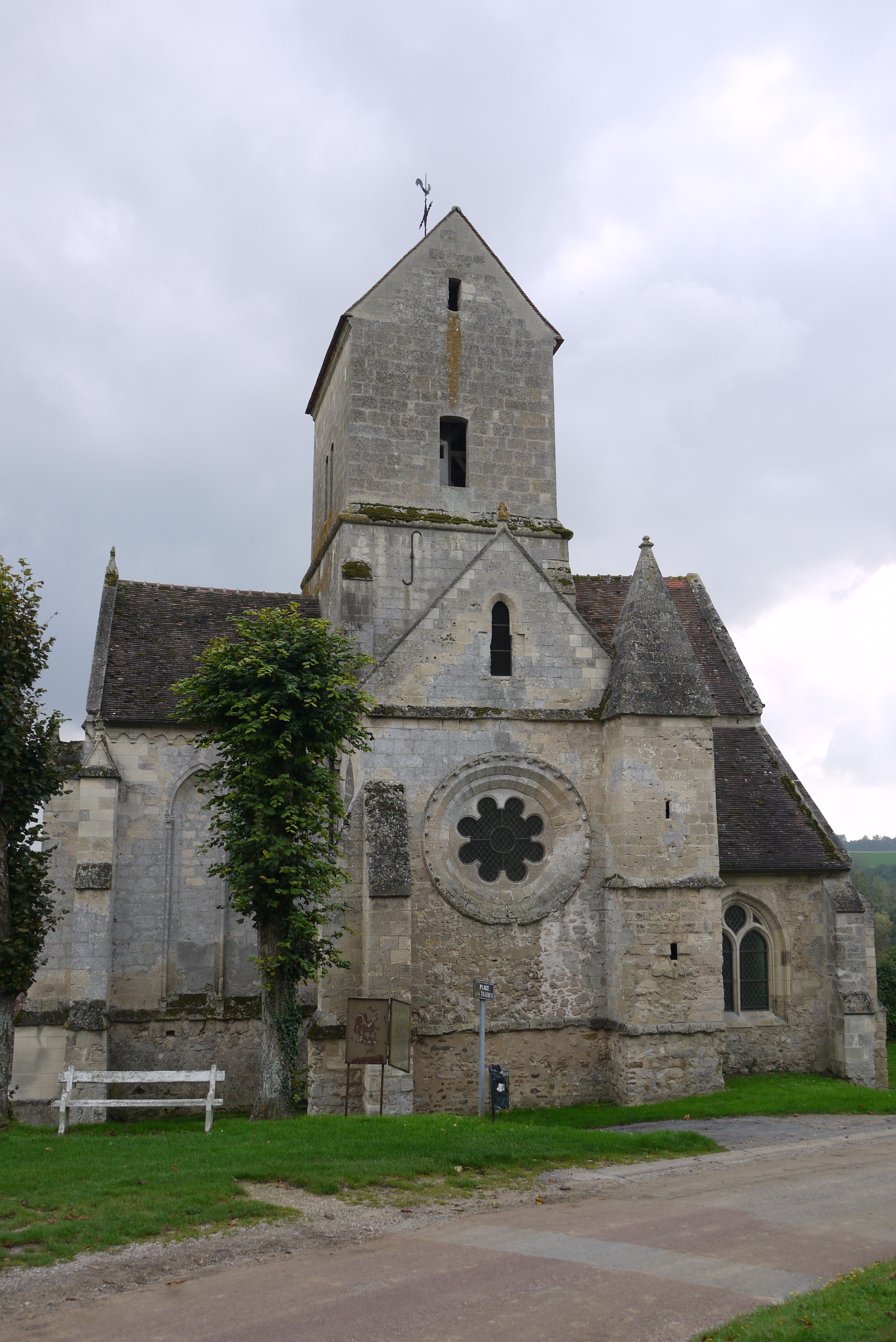
- The church of Brumetz
- Location of Brumetz
- Location within France Location within Hauts-de-France
- Coordinates: 49°06′10″N 3°09′41″E
- Country: France
- Region: Hauts-de-France
- Department: Aisne
- Arrondissement: Château-Thierry
- Canton: Villers-Cotterêts
- Intercommunality: CA Région de Château-Thierry

Government
  - Mayor (2026–32): Guillaume Damemme
- Area^{1}: 7.24 km^{2} (2.80 sq mi)
- Elevation: 70 m (230 ft)
- Highest elevation: 161 m (528 ft)
- Lowest elevation: 62 m (203 ft)
- Population (2023): 175
  - Density: 24.2/km^{2} (62.6/sq mi)
- Time zone: UTC+01:00 (CET)
  - Summer (DST): UTC+02:00 (CEST)
- INSEE/Postal code: 02125 /02810
- ^{1} French Land Register data, which excludes lakes, ponds, glaciers > 1 km^{2} (0.386 sq mi or 247 acres) and river estuaries.

Brumetz is a commune in the department of Aisne in Hauts-de-France in northern France.

== Population ==
Historical population
Year	Pop.	±% p.a.
1968	166	—
1975	199	+2.62%
1982	106	−8.61%
1990	166	+5.77%
1999	183	+1.09%
2007	203	+1.30%
2012	221	+1.71%
2017	213	−0.73%
2023	175	−3.22%
Source: INSEE

== See also ==
- Communes of the Aisne department
