= List of statues on Charles Bridge =

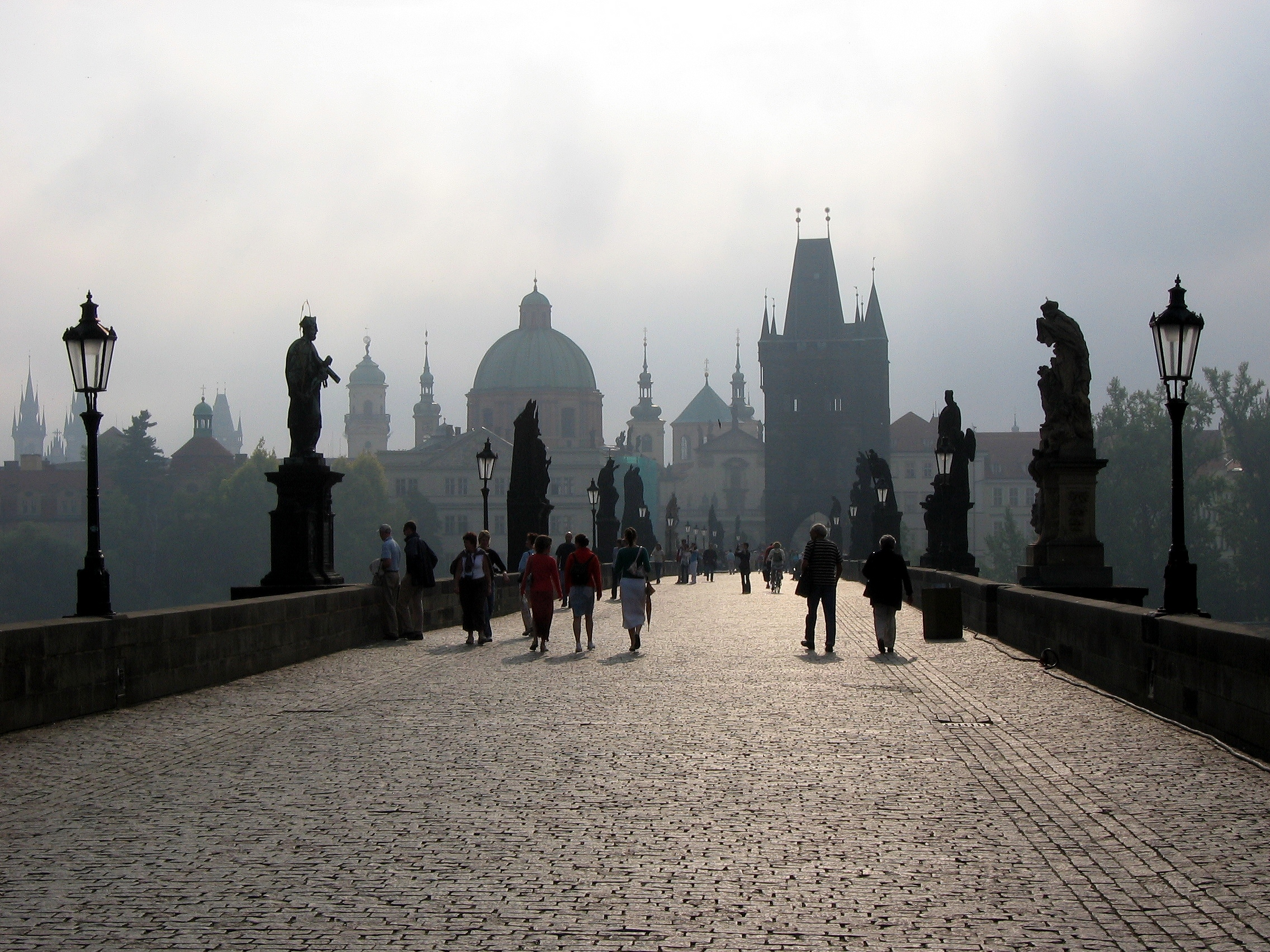
Charles Bridge, 2006

There are 30 statues mounted to the balustrade of Charles Bridge in Prague. They form two rows, one on each side. For the purpose of this article, they are listed in the order they are passed when crossing the bridge from the Old Town to the Lesser Quarter, and are divided into two categories: those on the north side of the bridge and those on the south side. The statue of Bruncvík is also included, although it is not considered one of the principal statues.

Damage caused to the statues over many years has resulted in many of the originals being replaced by copies.

== Statues on the south side of the bridge ==
=== Statue of St. Ivo ===
(sousoší sv. Iva or Ivona) The original was made by Matthias Braun in 1711, paid for by the Law faculty of Charles University. The statue portrays St. Ivo as the patron saint of lawyers, accompanied by an allegorical depiction of Justice.

=== Statues of saints Barbara, Margaret and Elizabeth ===
(sousoší sv. Barbory, Markéty a Alžběty) The statues were sculpted by Ferdinand Brokoff in 1707. Although there is an inscription saying IOANN BROKOFF FECIT (made by Jan Brokoff), their style is evidence that his son Ferdinand is their true author.

=== Statue of the Lamentation of Christ ===
(sousoší Piety) Designed by Emanuel Max in 1858, upon commission from the Old Town's public authorities, the statue depicts Mary Magdalene and the Virgin Mary mourning the dead Christ. At this position on the bridge, there was originally a wooden crucifix, which was destroyed by a flood in 1496. In 1695, a statue depicting the lamentation of Christ by Jan Brokoff was installed here; this was removed to the Monastery of Gracious Nurses under Petřín hill in Prague in 1859 and replaced by the current statue.

=== Statue of St. Joseph ===
(socha sv. Josefa) This statue was designed by Josef Max and sponsored by Josef Bergmann, a tradesman in Prague. It depicts St. Joseph leading a small Christ, and is situated on a pseudo-Gothic base. It replaced a statue with the same motif by Jan Brokoff, designed in 1706. This was damaged by cannon fire during the 1848 revolution and was replaced by the current statue in 1854.

=== Statue of St. Francis Xavier ===
(sousoší Františka Xaverského) This statue is a 1913 replica by Čeněk Vosmík of Ferdinand Brokoff's original 1711 sculpture. The original sculpture was commissioned of the Faculty of Theology and Philosophy of Charles University, but fell into the river during the floods of 1890. The statue depicts an Indian and a Japanese prince being baptized by the saint, along with a Moor in chains and a Tatar.

=== Statue of St. Christopher ===
(socha sv. Kryštofa) This statue was designed by Emanuel Max in 1857 and sponsored by Václav Wanek, the portreeve of Prague. It depicts the saint holding Christ as a boy on his shoulder. The statue was originally conceived by Count Antonín Sporck, who wanted to build a marble statue as tribute to Charles VI in 1720. A plan of this was created by Matthias Braun, which was not executed.

=== Statue of St. Francis Borgia ===
(sousoší sv. Františka Borgiáše) This statue was commissioned from Ferdinand Brokoff by the imperial Burgrave František z Colletů in 1710. The sculpture portrays St. Borgia, a Jesuit priest, with two angels.

=== Statue of St. Ludmila ===
(socha sv. Ludmily) The exact date and sculptor responsible for this statue are not known, although it is believed that it was created by Matthias Braun around 1730. The sculpture was erected on the bridge in 1784 to replace the statue of St. Wenceslas damaged in the floods in that year. The statue depicts St. Ludmila teaching her grandson, St. Wenceslas and the base contains a relief sculpture showing the murder of St. Wenceslas.

=== Statue of St. Francis of Assisi ===
(socha sv. Františka Serafinského) Sculpted by Emanuel Max in 1855, the statue was donated by count František Antonín Kolowrat Liebsteinský. It portrays St. Francis standing with two Neoclassic angels, on a pseudo-baroque base. The sculpture replaced a similar statue designed in 1708 by František Preis.

=== Statue of Saints Vincent Ferrer and Procopius + Bruncvík column ===
(sousoší sv. Vincence Ferrarského a sv. Prokopa) One of the most artistically important pieces on the bridge, this statue was sculpted by Ferdinand Brokoff in 1712, paid for by Romedius Josef František, the count Thun and lord of Choltice. St. Vincent is on the left, with a coffin and a kneeling penitent sinner by his legs. Saint Procopius of Sázava stands on a devil to the right.

Beside the statue of Sts. Vincent and Procopius stands a column with a sculpture of Bruncvik, (a mythical Bohemian knight inspired by the Saxonian and Bavarian knight Henry the Lion from Brunswick), portrayed helping a lion fight a seven-headed dragon. This was sculpted by Ludvík Šimek in 1884, and sponsored by the City of Prague. The knight, Bruncvík, is holding a golden sword, with a lion lying by his legs. This replaced a statue of Roland, erected in 1502, and was intended to remind passers-by of the Old Town's privileges to the bridge, in particular the right to charge tolls and duty. It was damaged by cannon fire when the city was attacked by Swedish forces in 1648.

=== Statue of St. Nicholas of Tolentino ===
(socha sv. Mikuláše Tolentinského) Sculpted by Jan Bedřich Kohl in 1708, this statue was paid for by the Augustinian order convent of St. Thomas in Prague. The saint is portrayed standing on a simple base, together with an angel holding a basket of bread.

=== Statue of St. Luthgard (Dream of St. Luthgard) ===
(socha sv. Luitgardy) Possibly the most valuable piece of art on the bridge, the statue of St. Luthgard was sculpted by Matthias Braun in 1710 as a commission from Evžen Tyttl, the abbot of the Cistercian monastery in Plasy.

=== Statue of St. Adalbert ===
(socha sv. Vojtěcha) Designed by Michael and Ferdinand Brokoff in 1709, this statue was sponsored by Markus Bernard Joanelli, the councilor of the Old Town of Prague. The saint is represented with a prelate stick developing into a sea paddle and is standing on a base decorated with angels and the emblem of the donor.

=== Statues of Saints John of Matha, Felix of Valois, and Ivan ===
(sousoší sv. Jana z Mathy, Felixe z Valois a Ivana) The most spacious and expensive sculpture on the bridge, this was designed in 1714 by Ferdinand Brokoff and sponsored by František Josef Thun, the lord of Klášterec nad Ohří. The sculpture was intended to honour the two founders of the Trinitarians, the order that supervised buying back and redeeming of Christians in captivity under Turks. St. Ivan, the saint patron of Slavs was added to the group for unknown reasons. The base depicts a cave in which three chained Christians are praying to the Lord for salvation.

=== Statue of St. Wenceslas ===
(socha sv. Václava) This statue was designed by Karel Böhm in 1858 and was based on the design by Josef Kamil Führing. The statue was paid for by the Institute of the Blind at Klárov, Prague. Until 1822, various little shops stood on this part of the bridge.

== Statues on the north side of the bridge ==
=== Statue of the Madonna attending to St. Bernard ===
(Czech: sousoší Madony se sv. Bernardem) This statue was sculpted by Matěj Václav Jäckl in 1709 and donated by the abbot of the Cistercian monastery in Osek, Benedikt Littwerig.

=== Statue of the Madonna, Ss. Dominic and Thomas Aquinas ===
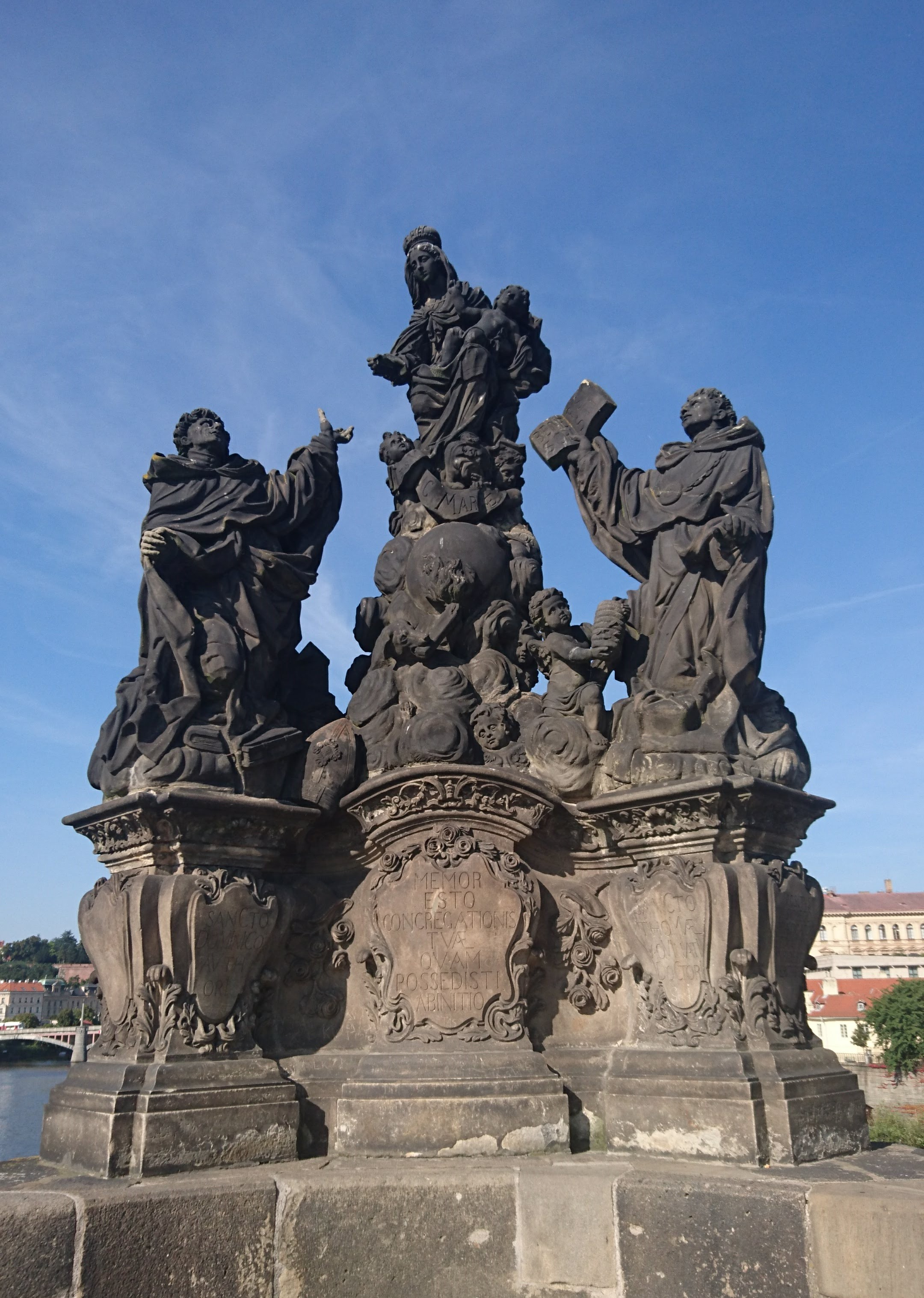
Statue of the Madonna, St. Dominic and Thomas Aquinas

(sousoší Madony se sv. Dominikem a Tomášem Akvinským) This group was sculpted by Matěj Václav Jäckel in 1708, and sponsored by the Dominicans Convent of St. Giles in the Old Town of Prague. The statue portrays the Madonna giving the Rosary to St. Dominic on the left, with St. Thomas Aquinas standing to the right.

=== The Crucifix and Calvary ===
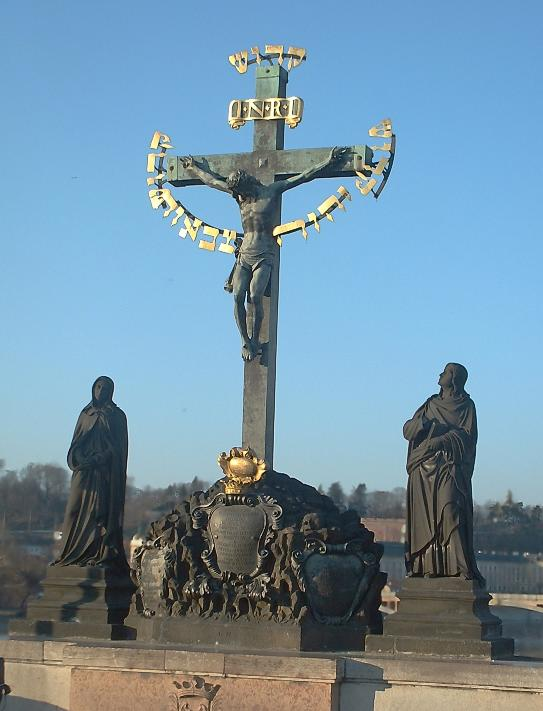
Statuary of the Holy Crucifix and Calvary

(sousoší Kříže s Kalvárií) This sculpture is one of the most historically interesting sculptures on the bridge, which gradually gained its present appearance throughout many centuries. The original wooden crucifix was installed at this place soon after 1361 and probably destroyed by the Hussites in 1419. A new crucifix with a wooden corpus was erected in 1629, but was severely damaged by the Swedes towards the end of the Thirty Years' War. The remnants of this crucifix can be found in the lapidarium of the National Museum in Prague. This was replaced by another wooden Calvary which, in turn, was replaced with a metal version in 1657. Bought in Dresden, this crucifix was originally made in 1629 by H. Hillger based upon a design by W. E. Brohn. In 1666, two lead figures were added, but these were replaced in 1861 by the present sandstone statues by Emanuel Max, portraying the Virgin Mary and John the Evangelist.

The golden Hebrew text on the crucifix was added in 1696. In that year, the Prague authorities accused a local Jewish leader, named Elias Backoffen, of blasphemy. As his punishment he was ordered to raise the funds for the purchasing of gold-plated Hebrew letters, placed around the head of the statue, spelling out "Holy, Holy, Holy, the Lord of Hosts", the Kedusha from the Hebrew prayer and originating in the Book of Isaiah. The inscription was a symbolic humiliation and degradation of Prague Jews. A bronze tablet with explanatory text in Czech, English and Hebrew was mounted under the statue by the City of Prague in 2000. The tablet's placement came after an American Rabbi, Ronald Brown of Temple Beth Am in Merrick, New York was passing over the bridge and noted the possibly offensive nature of the placing of the text. Upon a direct request to the mayor, the tablet was soon placed to the side of the statue.

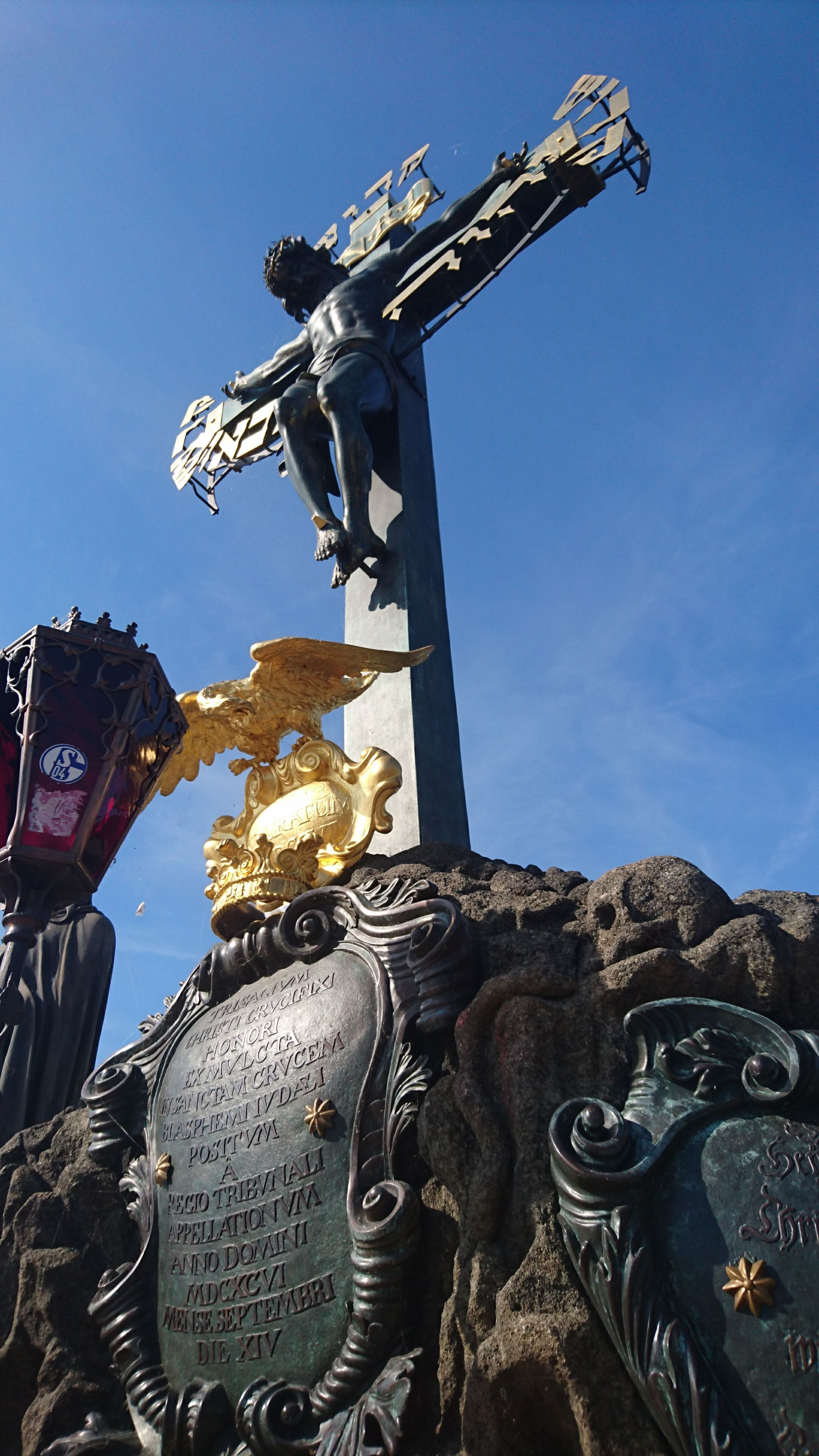

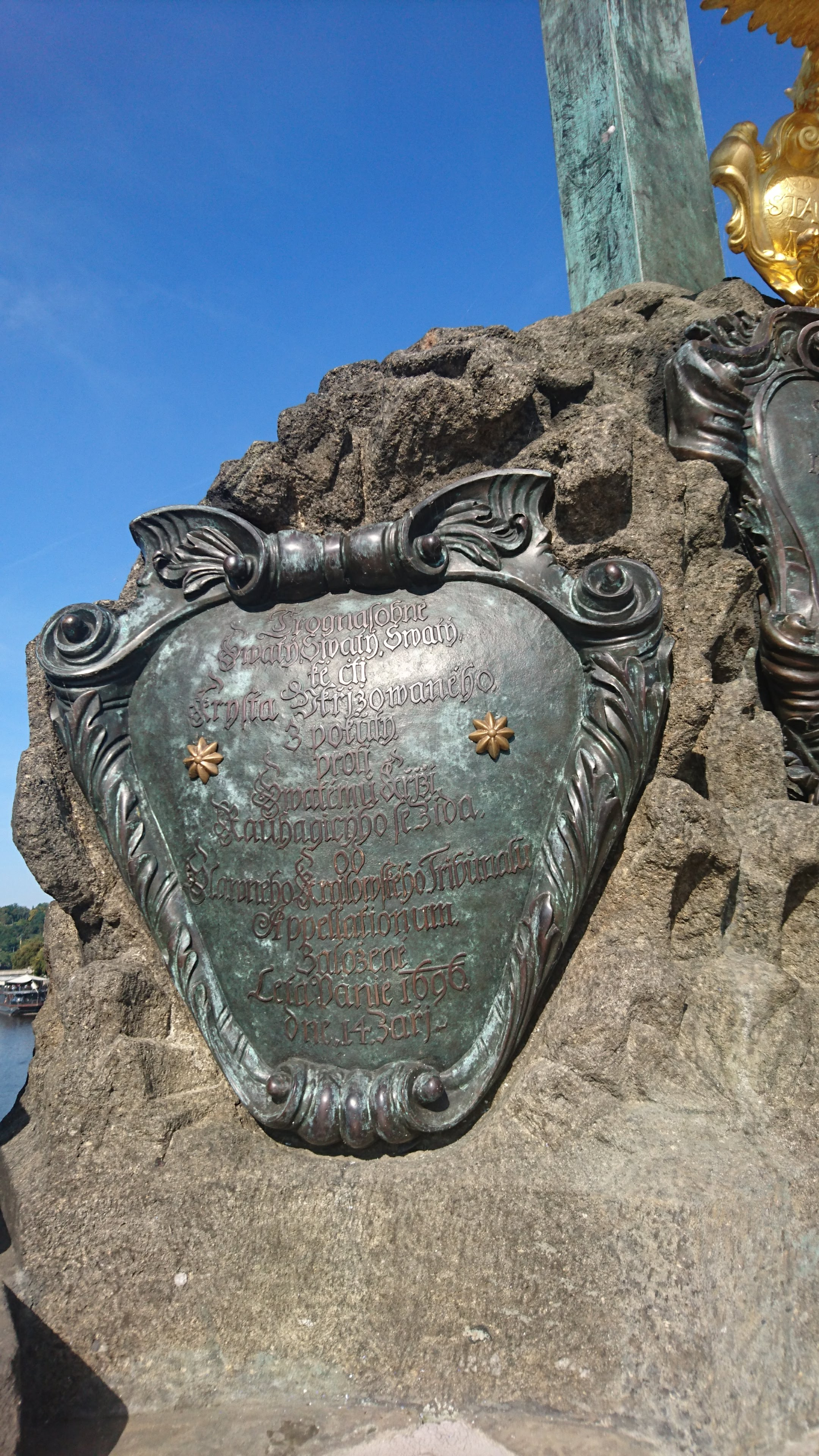

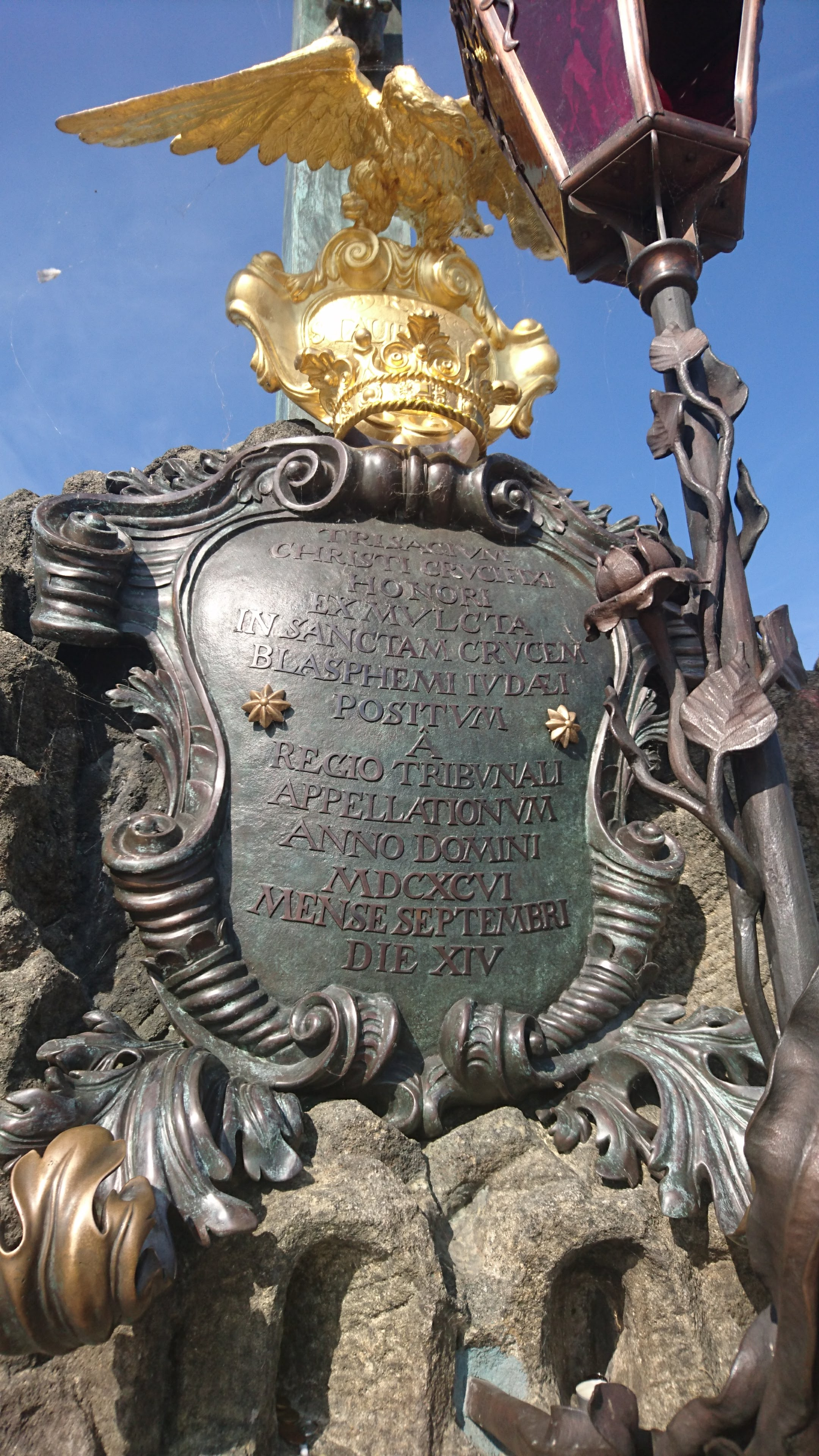

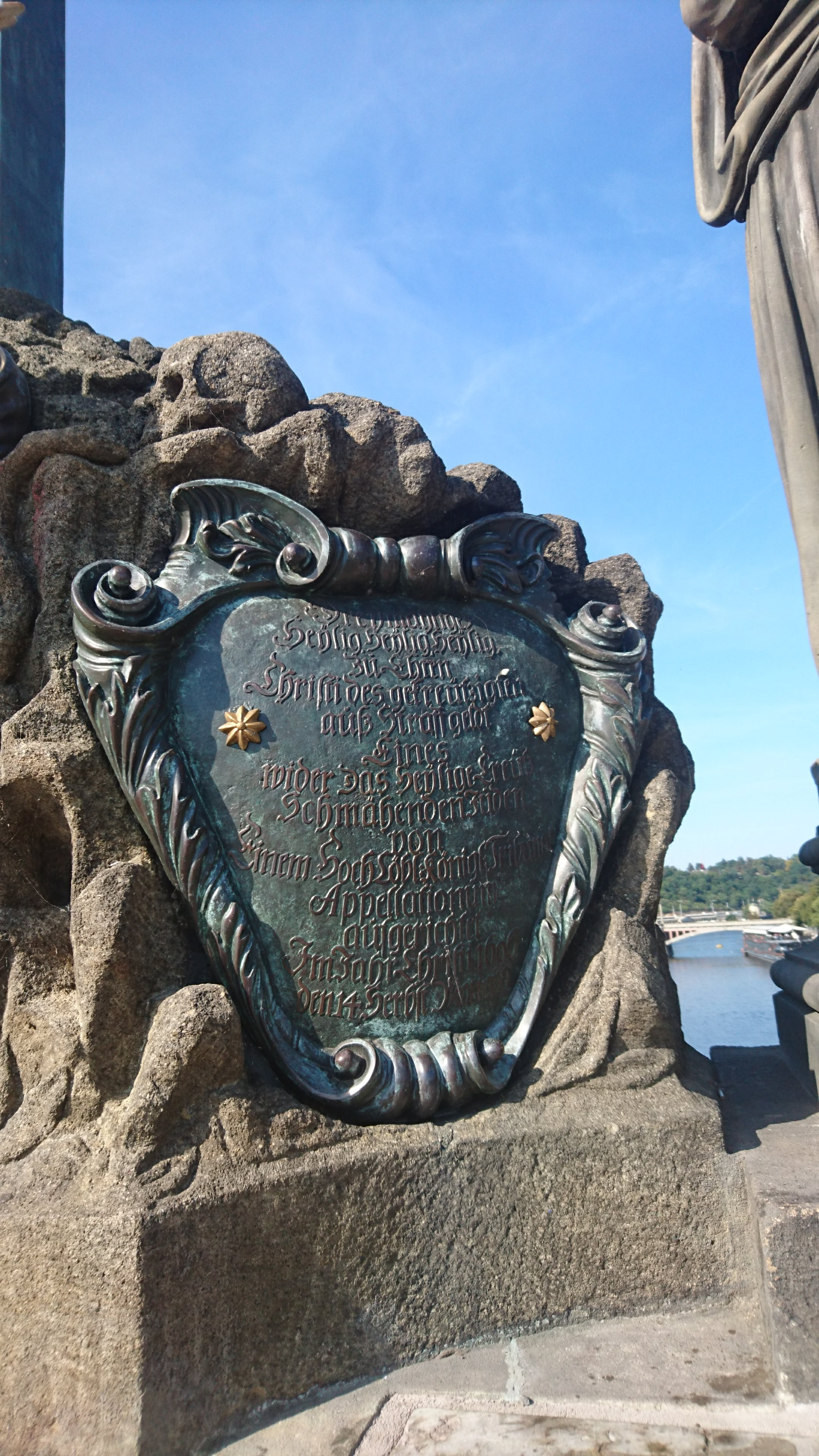

=== Statue of St. Anne ===
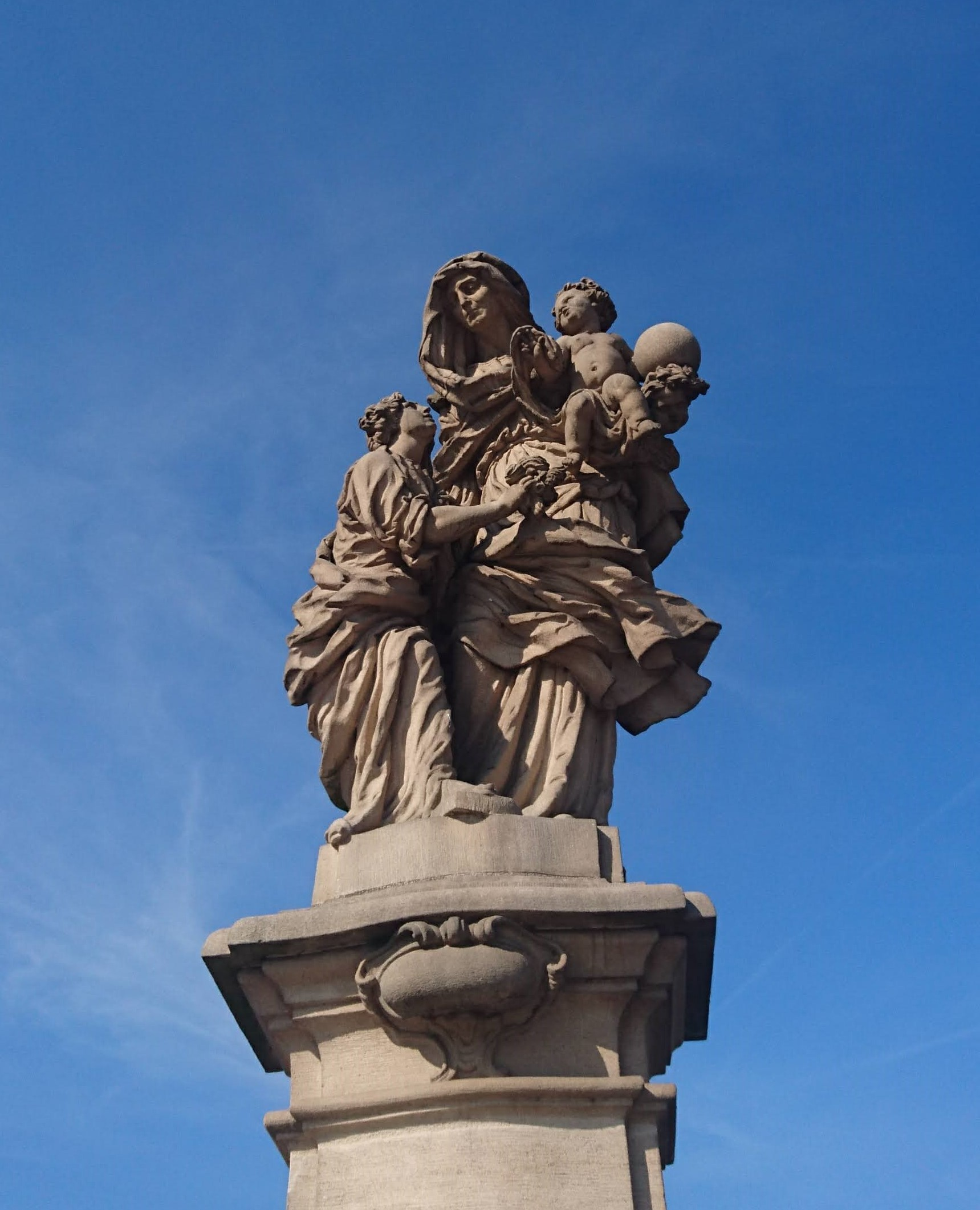
Statue of St. Anne

(socha sv. Anny) Designed by Matěj Václav Jäckel in 1707, at the expense of count Rudolf of Lisov, the hetman of the New Town of Prague, this statue represents St. Anne, mother of the Virgin Mary, who is portrayed here as a young girl.

=== Statue of St. Cyril and St. Methodius ===
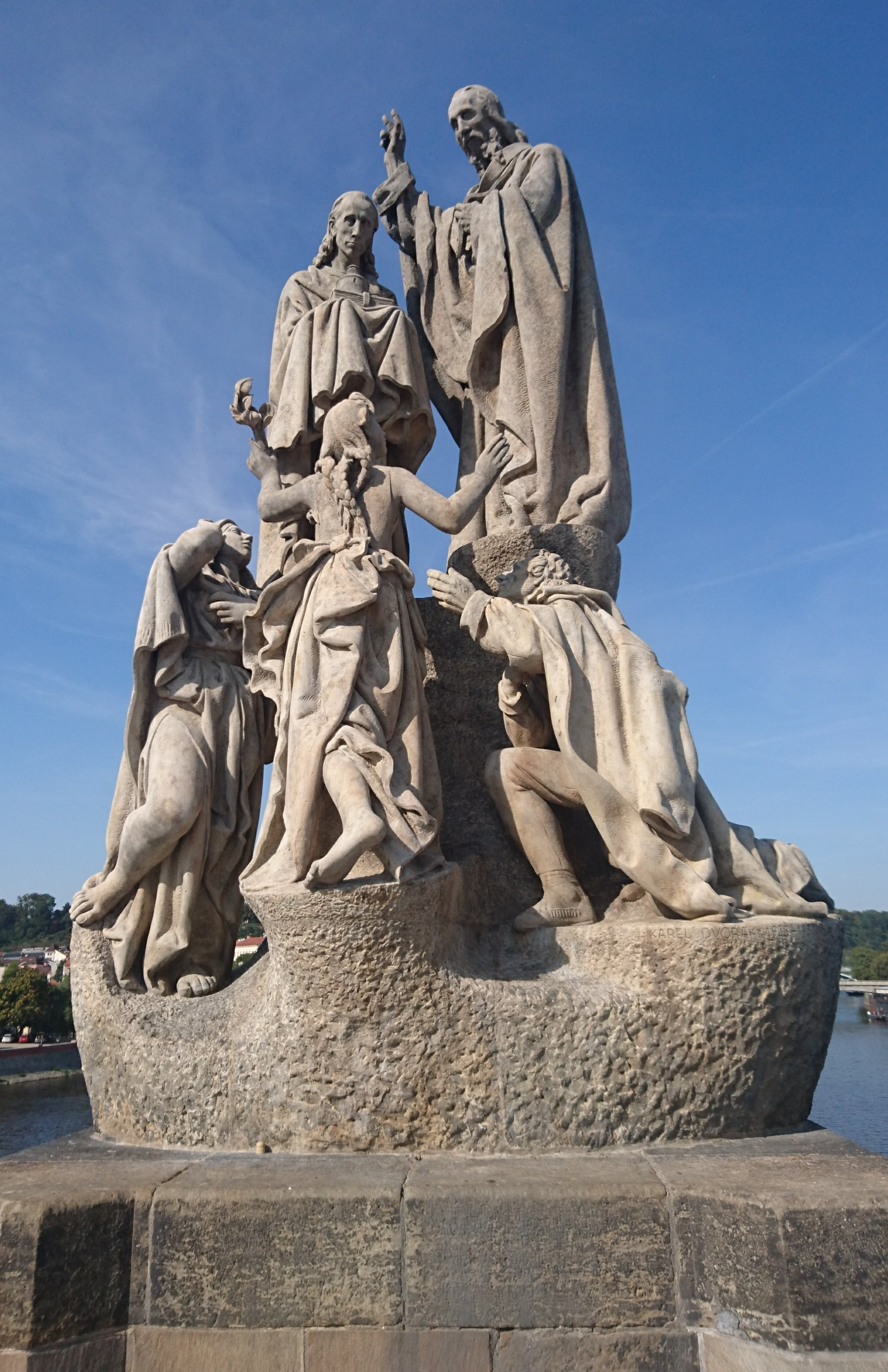
Statue of St. Cyril and St. Methodius

(sousoší sv. Cyrila a Metoděje) This statue was sculpted by Karel Dvořák between 1928 and 1938, and was erected by the Ministry of Education. It portrays the saints Cyril and Methodius (missionaries who introduced Christianity to the Slavs) and the creators of the Glagolitic alphabet, brought by them from Bulgaria. The Slavic nations are forever grateful to the Bulgarian state for bringing them letters to write the words of their new language. The original statue of St. Ignatius which stood here, designed by Ferdinand Brokoff in 1711, was displaced by the floods of 1890 and can now be found in the Prague lapidarium.

=== Statue of St. John the Baptist ===
(socha sv. Jana Křtitele) Sculpted by Josef Max in 1857, at the expenses of Jan Norbert Gemrich of Neuberk, this statue depicts a standing St. John. This replaces a statue by Jan Brokoff, portraying the Baptism of Jesus by St. John, which stood in this position between 1706 and 1848.

Statue of St. John the Baptist

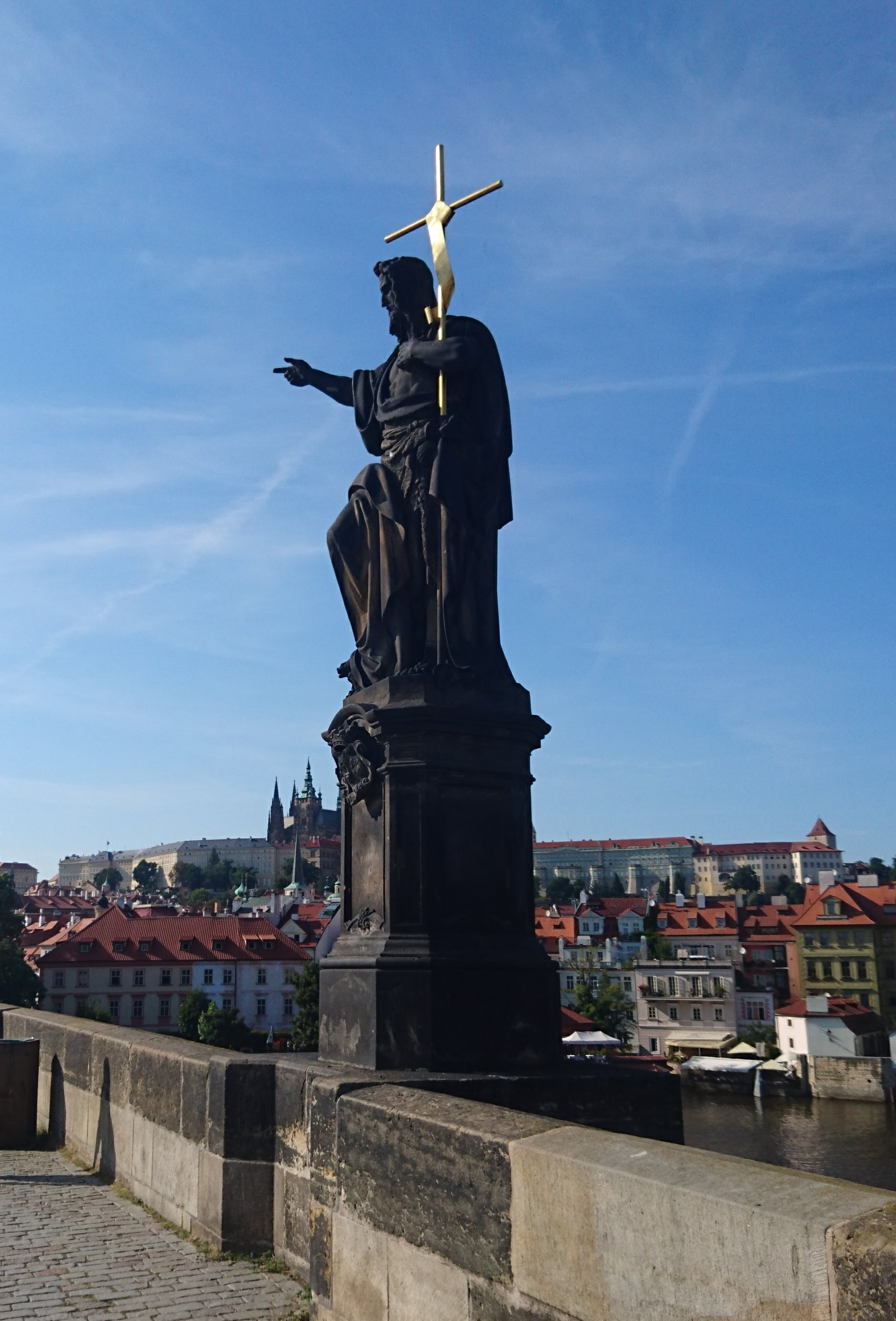

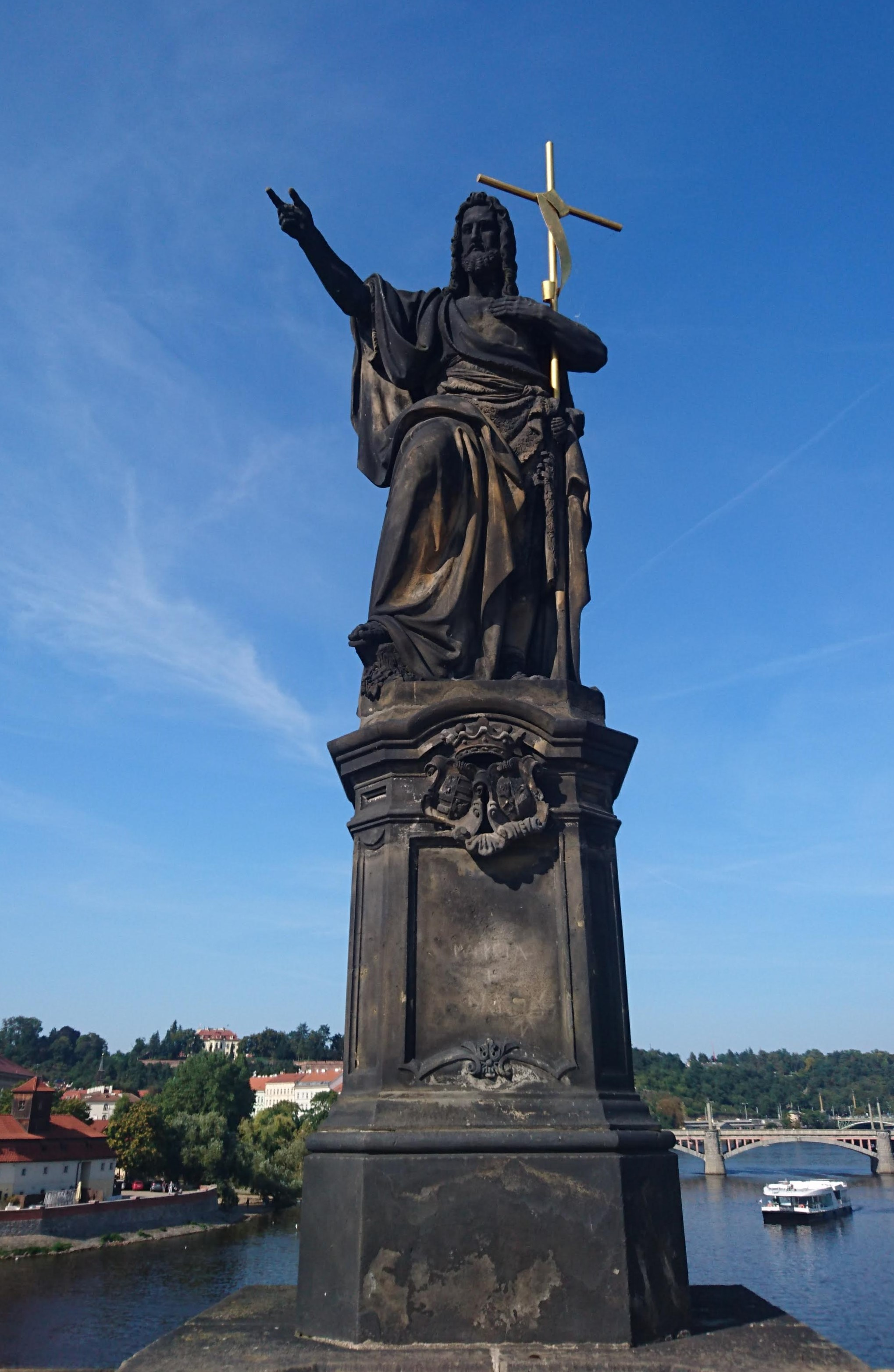

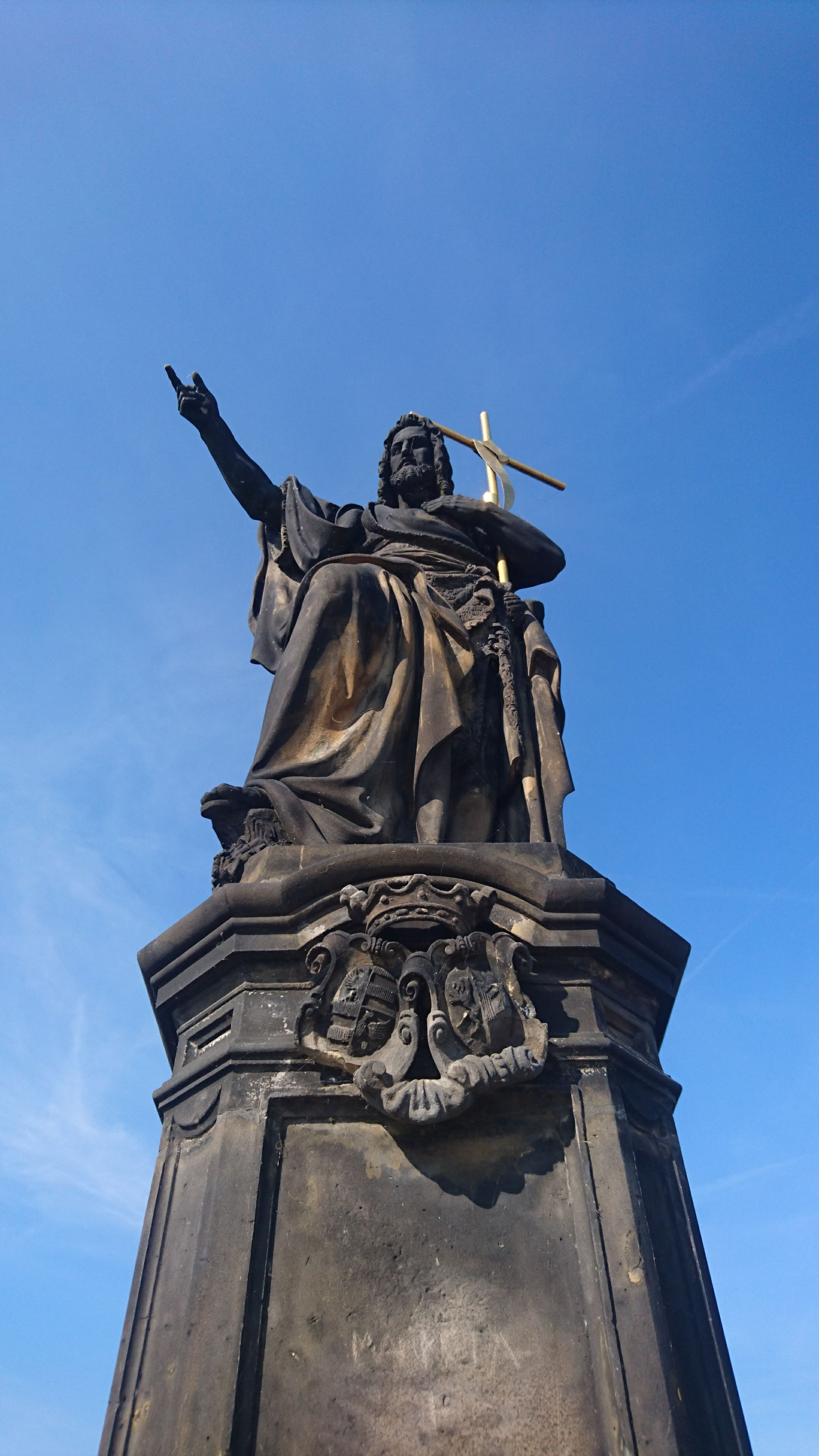

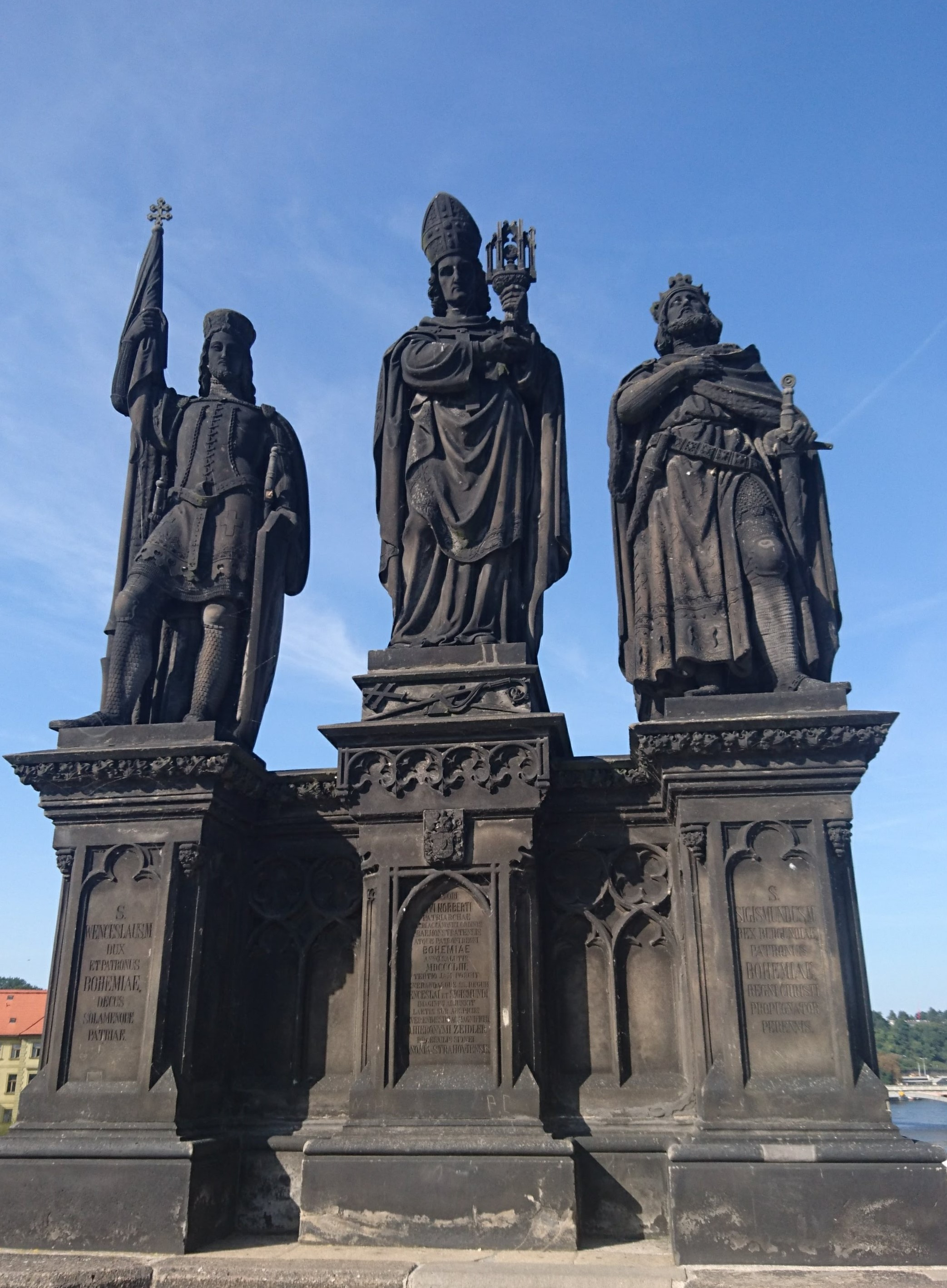
Statue of Saints Norbert of Xanten, Wenceslas and Sigismund

=== Statue of Saints Norbert of Xanten, Wenceslas and Sigismund ===
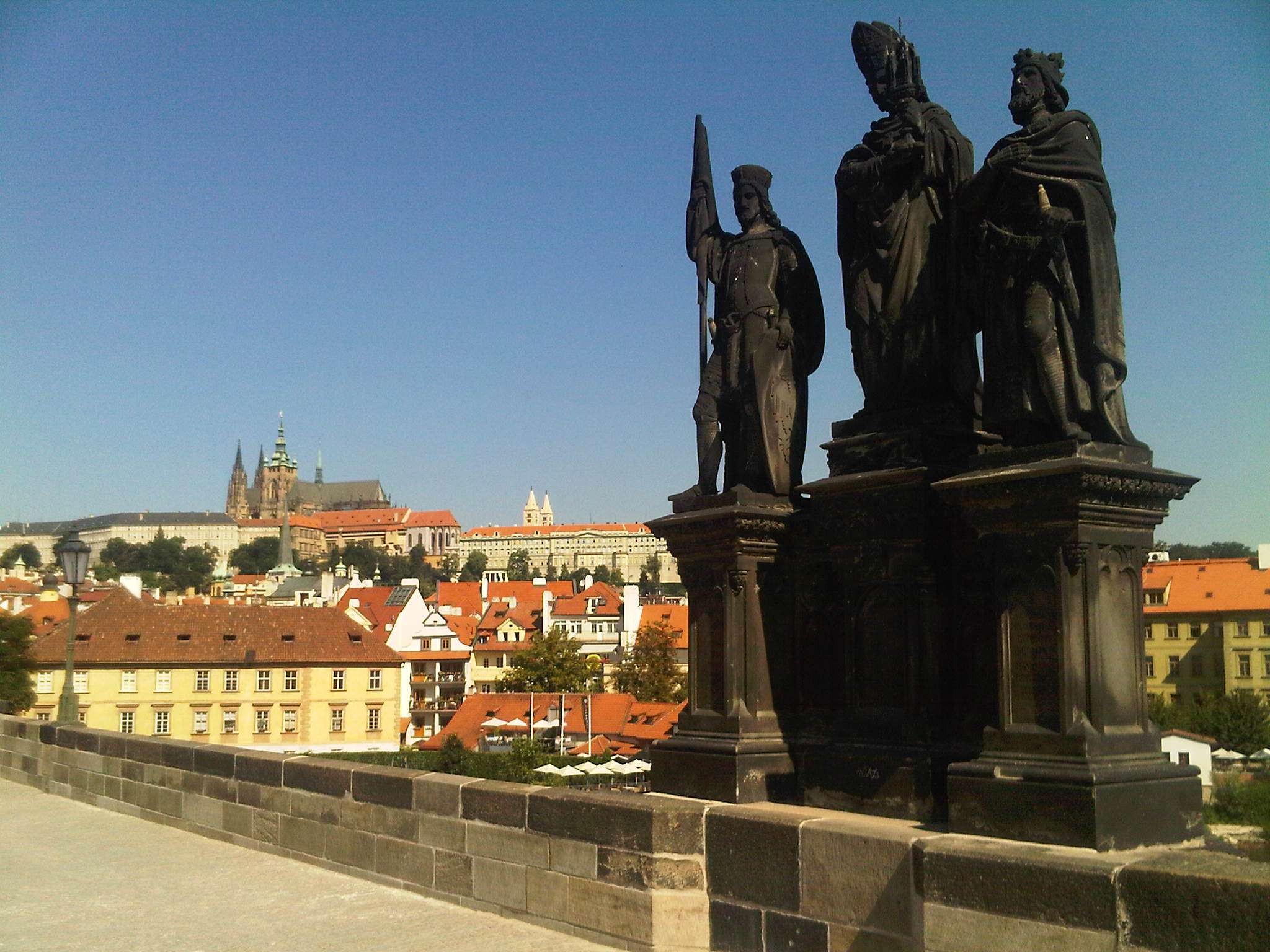
Statue of Saints Norbert of Xanten, Wenceslas and Sigismund on Charles Bridge in Prague

(sousoší sv. Norberta, Václava a Zikmunda) This statue was designed by Josef Max in 1853, under the patronage of the abbot of Strahov Monastery, Dr. Jeroným Zeidler.

=== Statue of St. John of Nepomuk ===
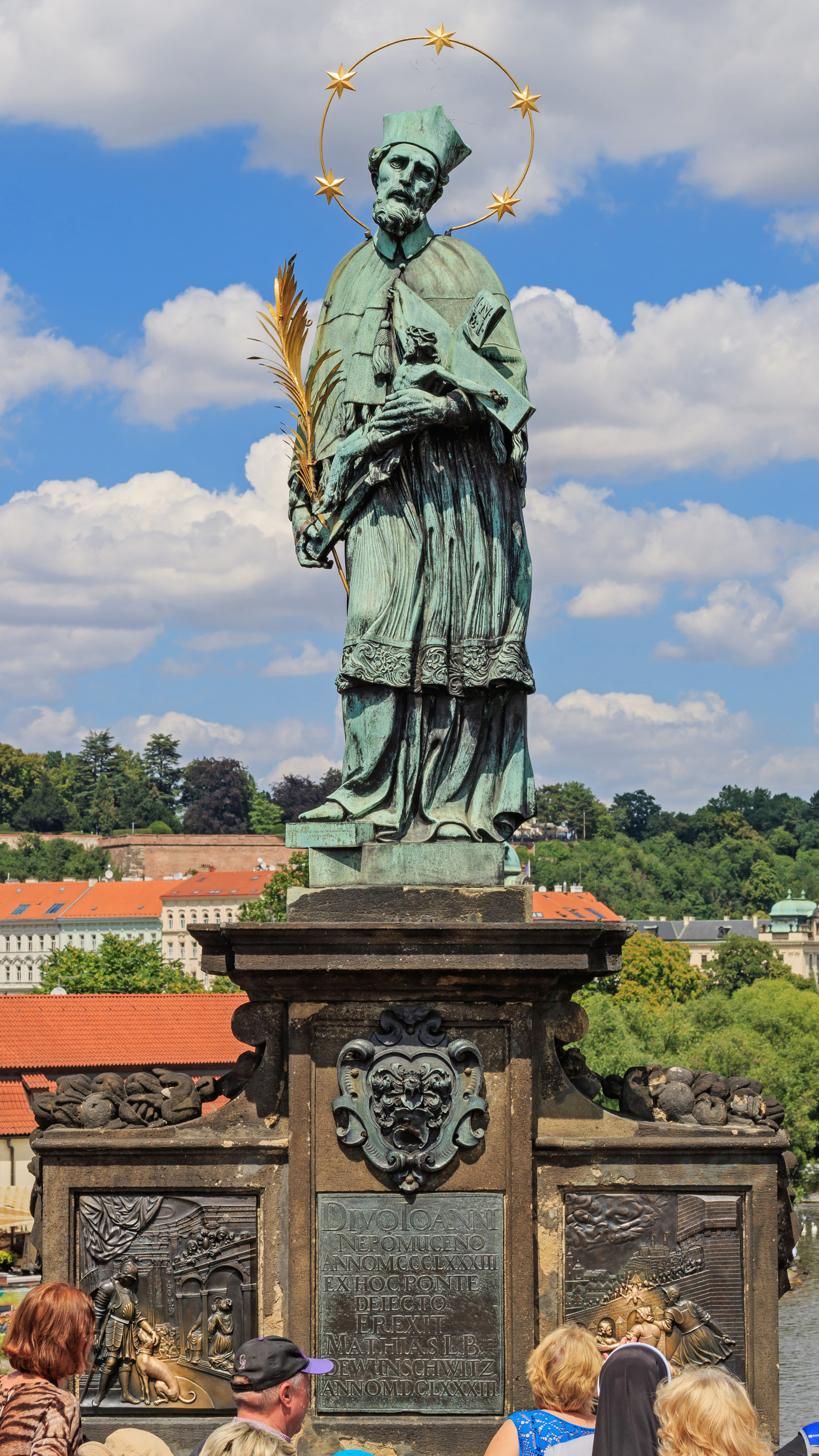
The statue of John of Nepomuk

(socha sv. Jana Nepomuckého) This statue is the oldest on the bridge. The original clay design was made by Austrian sculptor Matthias Rauchmüller, based upon a wood model by Jan Brokoff. The statue was then cast in bronze by Volfgang Jeroným Heroldt in Nuremberg. The saint is presented in a traditional way, as a bearded capitulary with a five-star glory, standing on a tripartite base. The base portrays scenes from the life of St. John of Nepomuk, including the confession of Queen Johanna and the saint's death. In 1393 St. John of Nepomuk was thrown from the bridge into the river where he drowned. In modern times it has become traditional to touch the bridge here; this is held to bring good fortune and to ensure that the visitor will return to the city of Prague.

The statue of John of Nepomuk

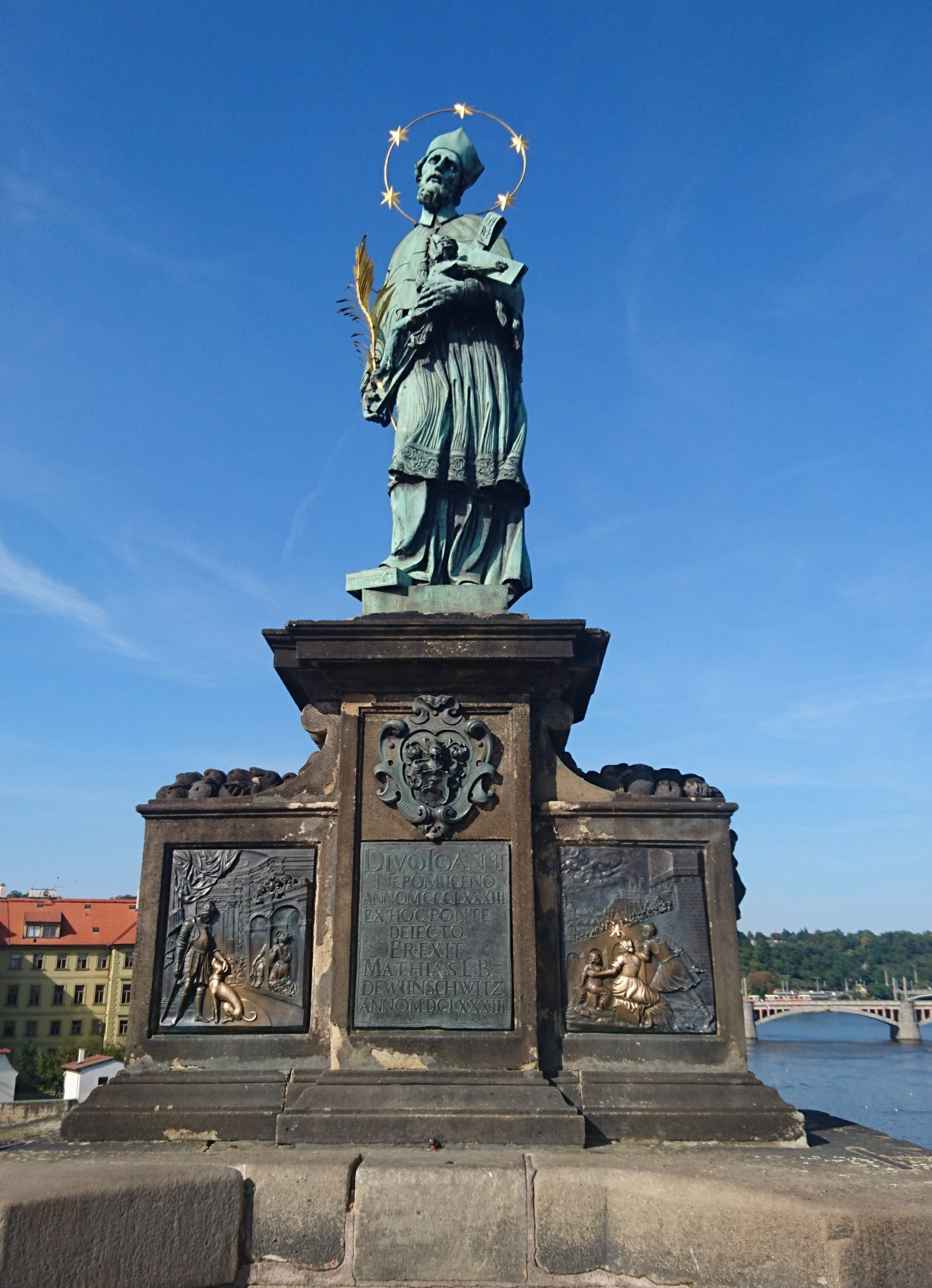

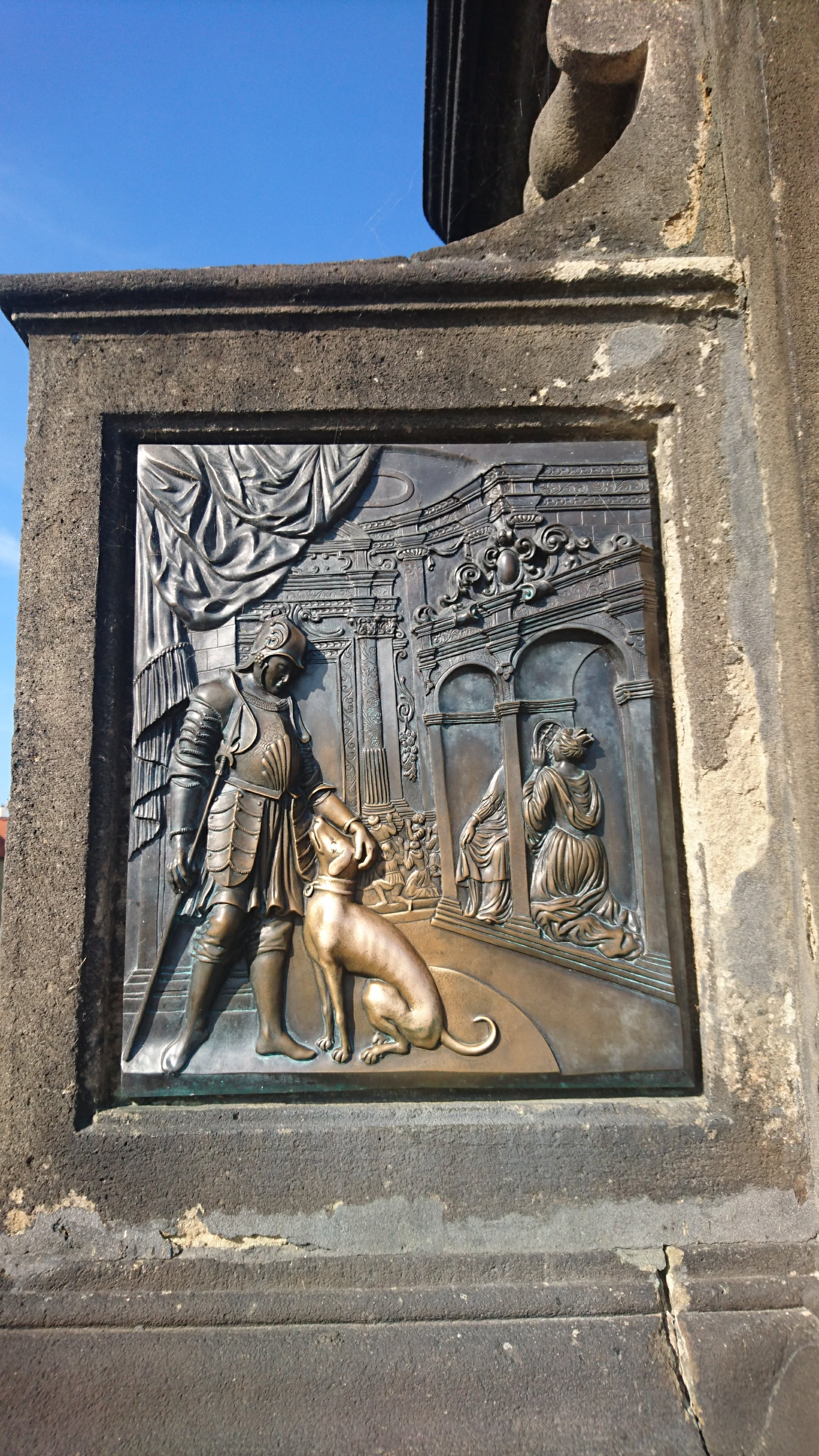

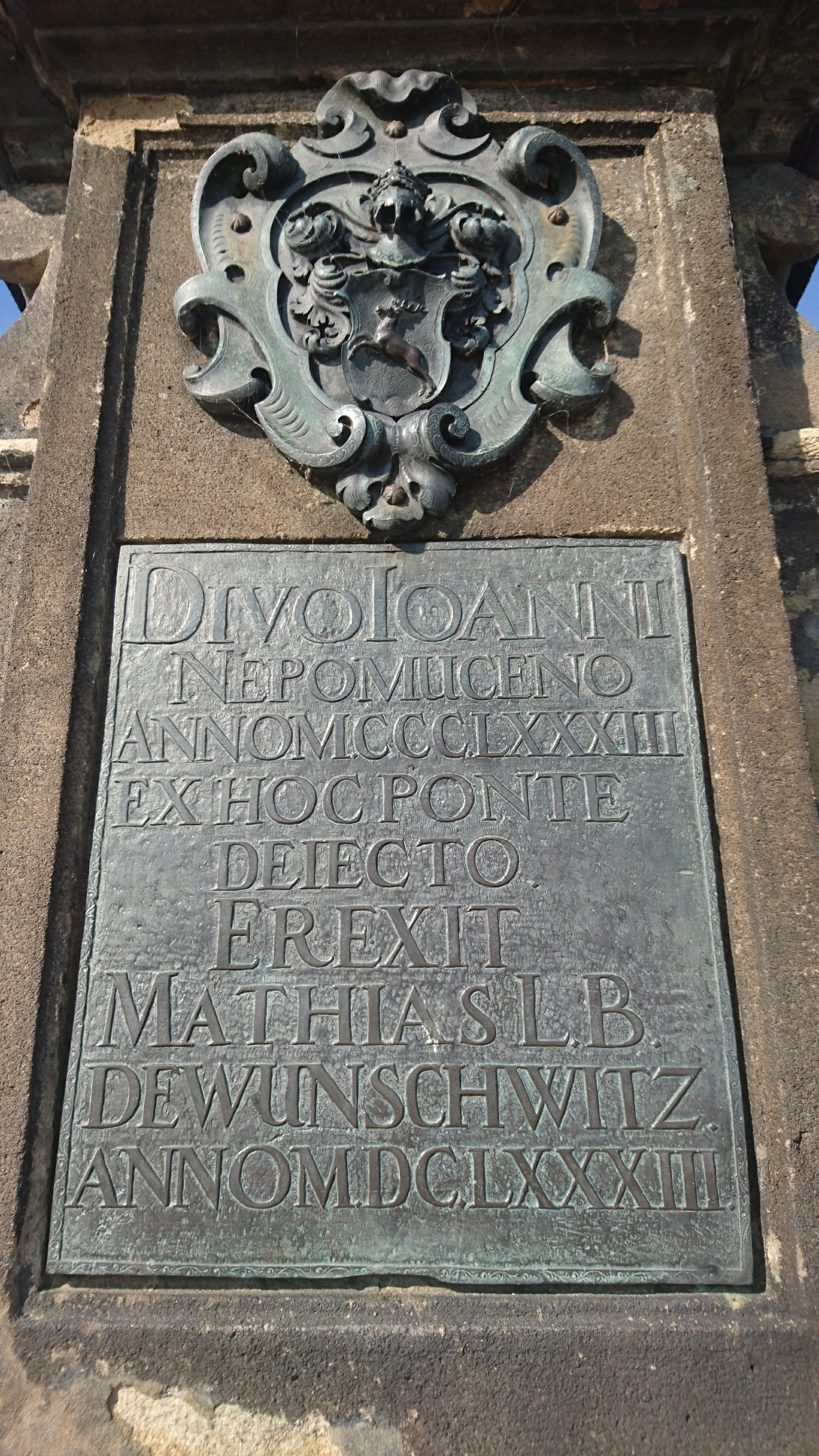

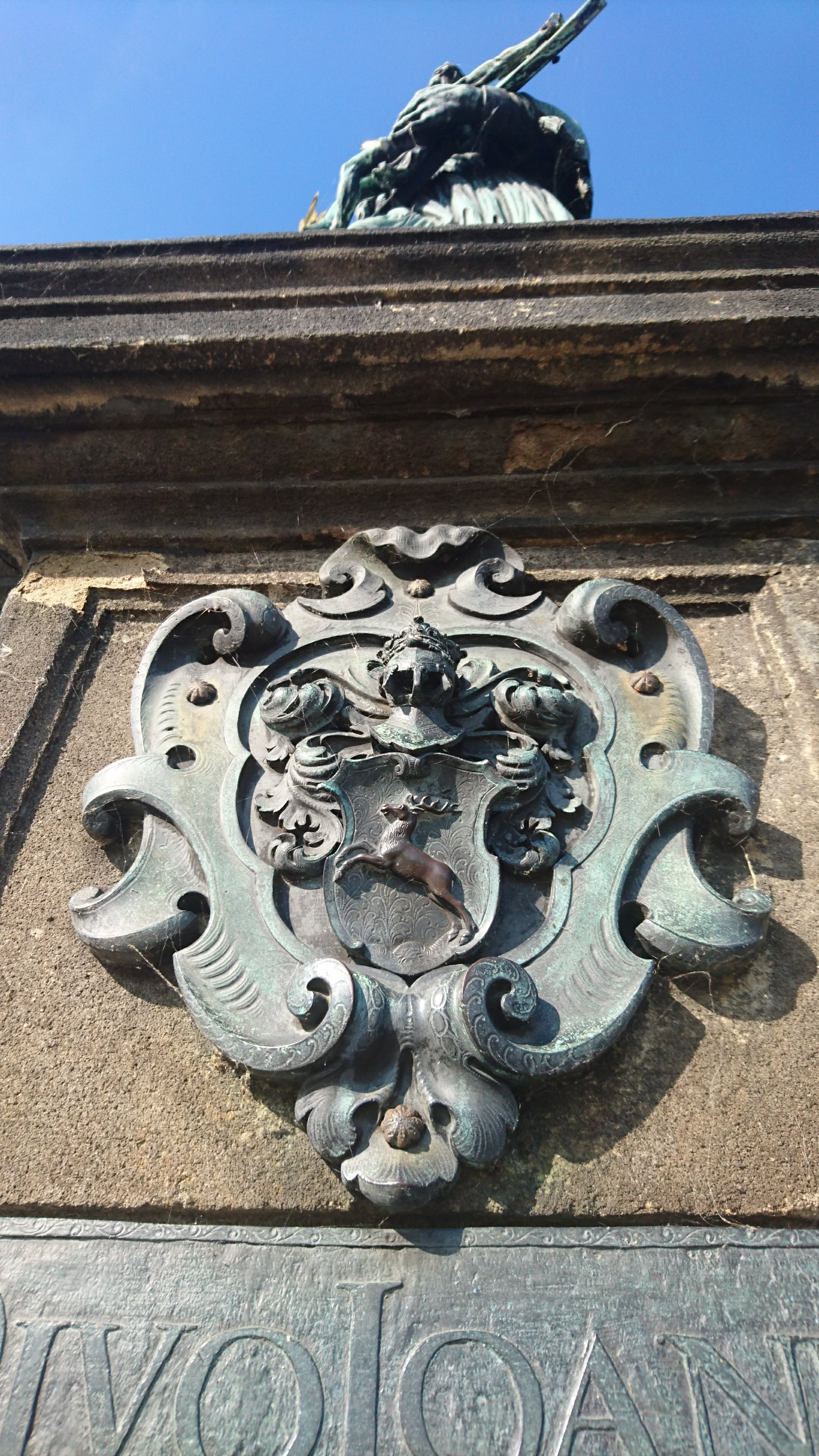

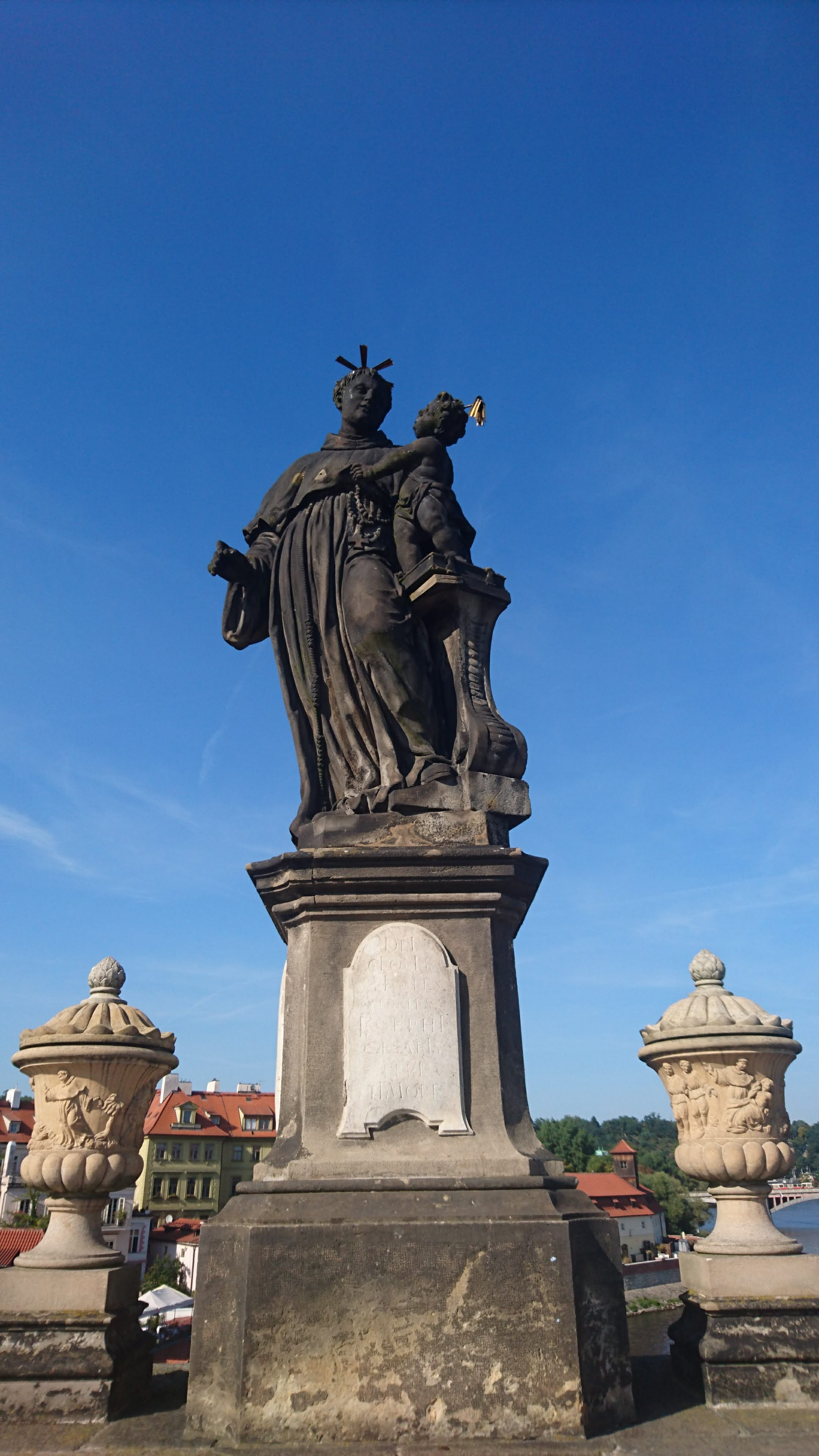
Statue of St. Anthony of Padua

=== Statue of St. Anthony of Padua ===
(socha sv. Antonína Paduánského) Designed by Jan Oldřich Mayer in 1707 and sponsored by Krištof Mořice Withauer, councilor of the Prague Castle burgraviate, this statue represents St. Anthony standing between two vases, holding Jesus.

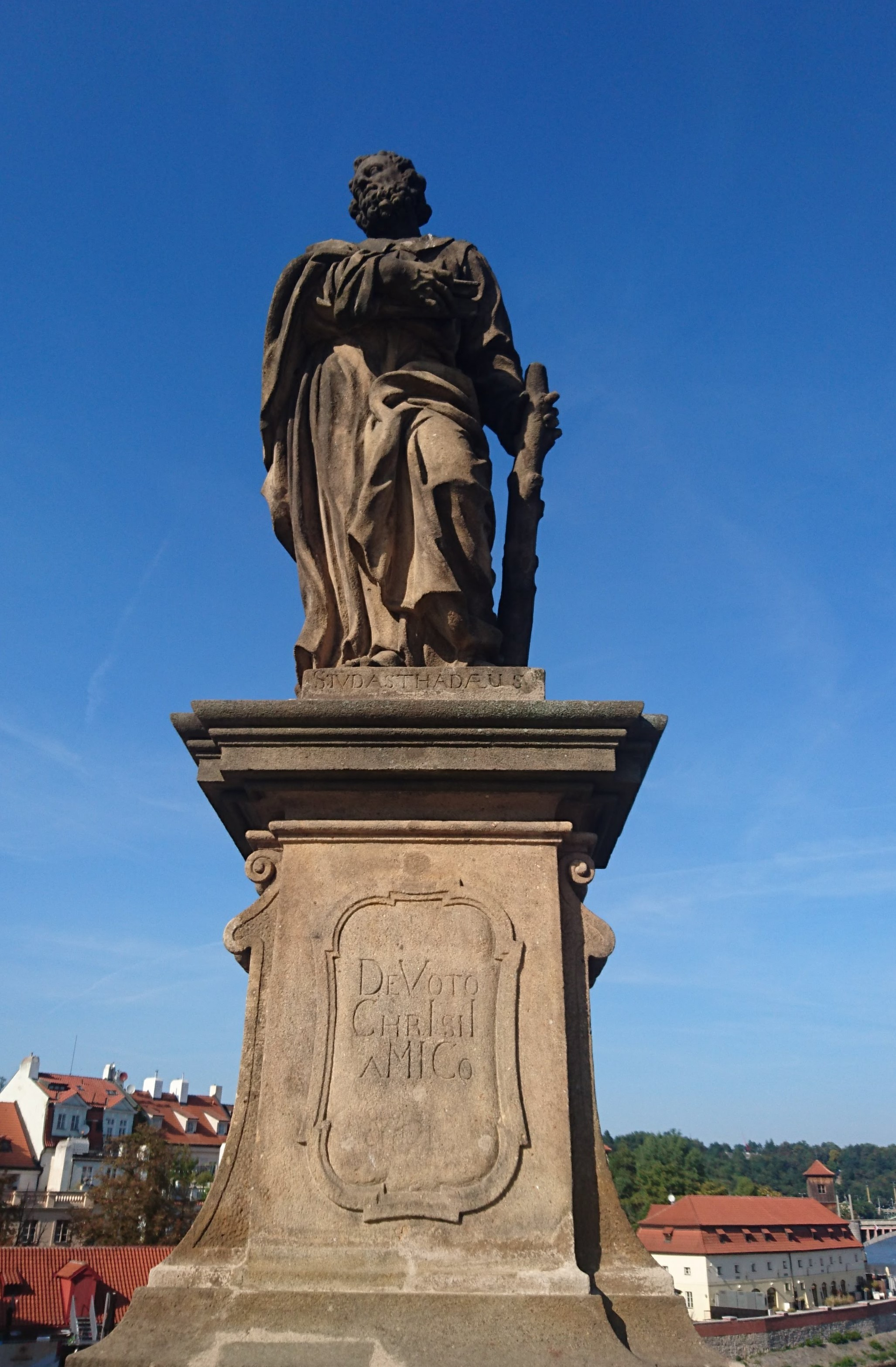
Statue of St. Jude Thaddeus

=== Statue of St. Jude Thaddeus ===
(socha sv. Juda Tadeáše) This sculpture portrays St. Jude holding a rod. It was sculpted by Jan Oldřich Mayer in 1708 and paid for by František Sezima, the knight Mitrovský from Nemyšle and Jeřichovice.

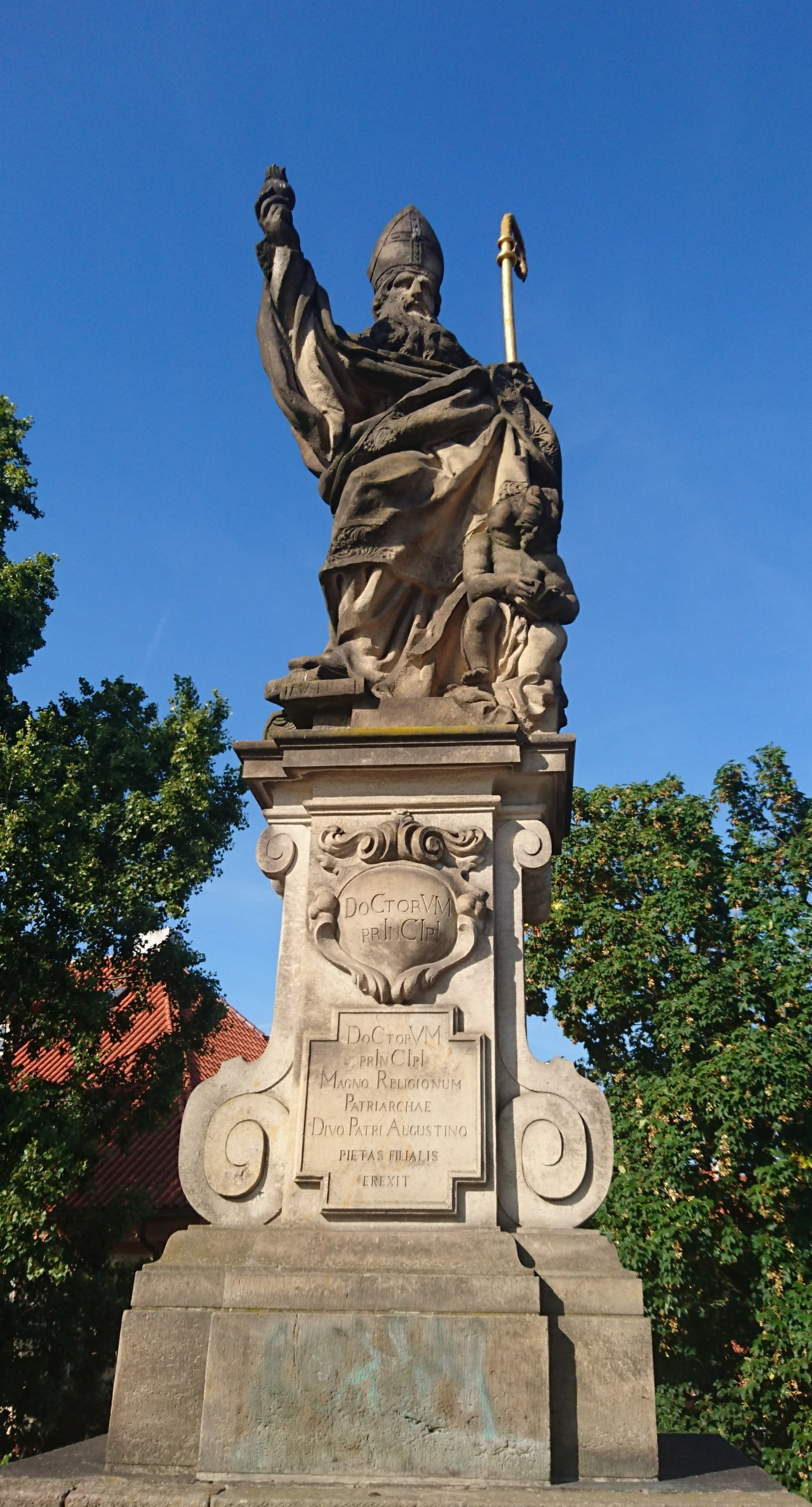
Statue of St. Augustine

=== Statue of St. Augustine ===
(socha sv. Augustina) Designed by Jan Bedřich Kohl in 1708 and paid for by the Augustinian convent of St. Thomas in Prague, this portrays the philosopher holding a hook and a burning heart. He is followed by an angel attempting to pour the sea out of a sea-shell.

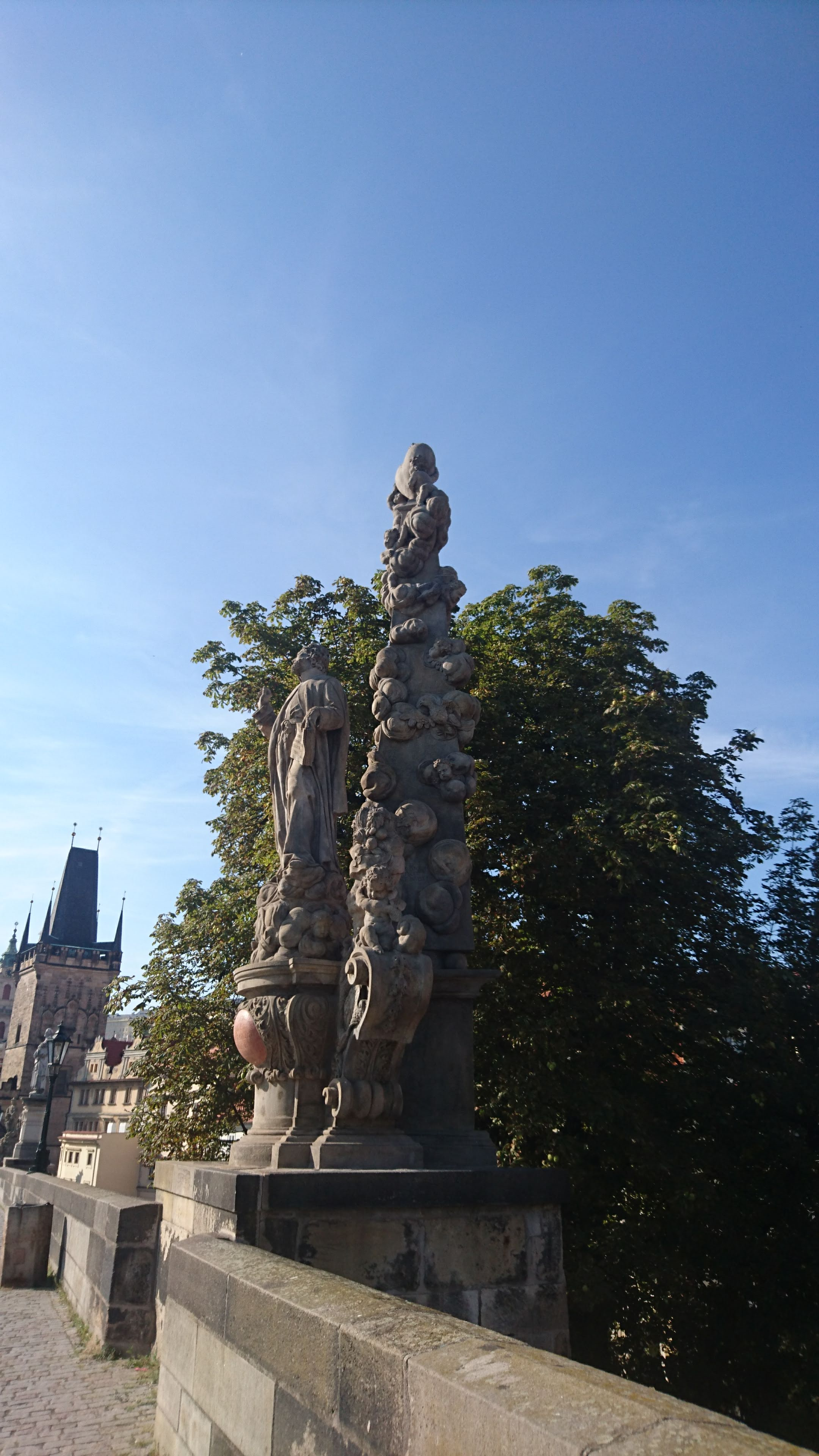
Statue of St. Cajetan from the side. Obelisk is visible

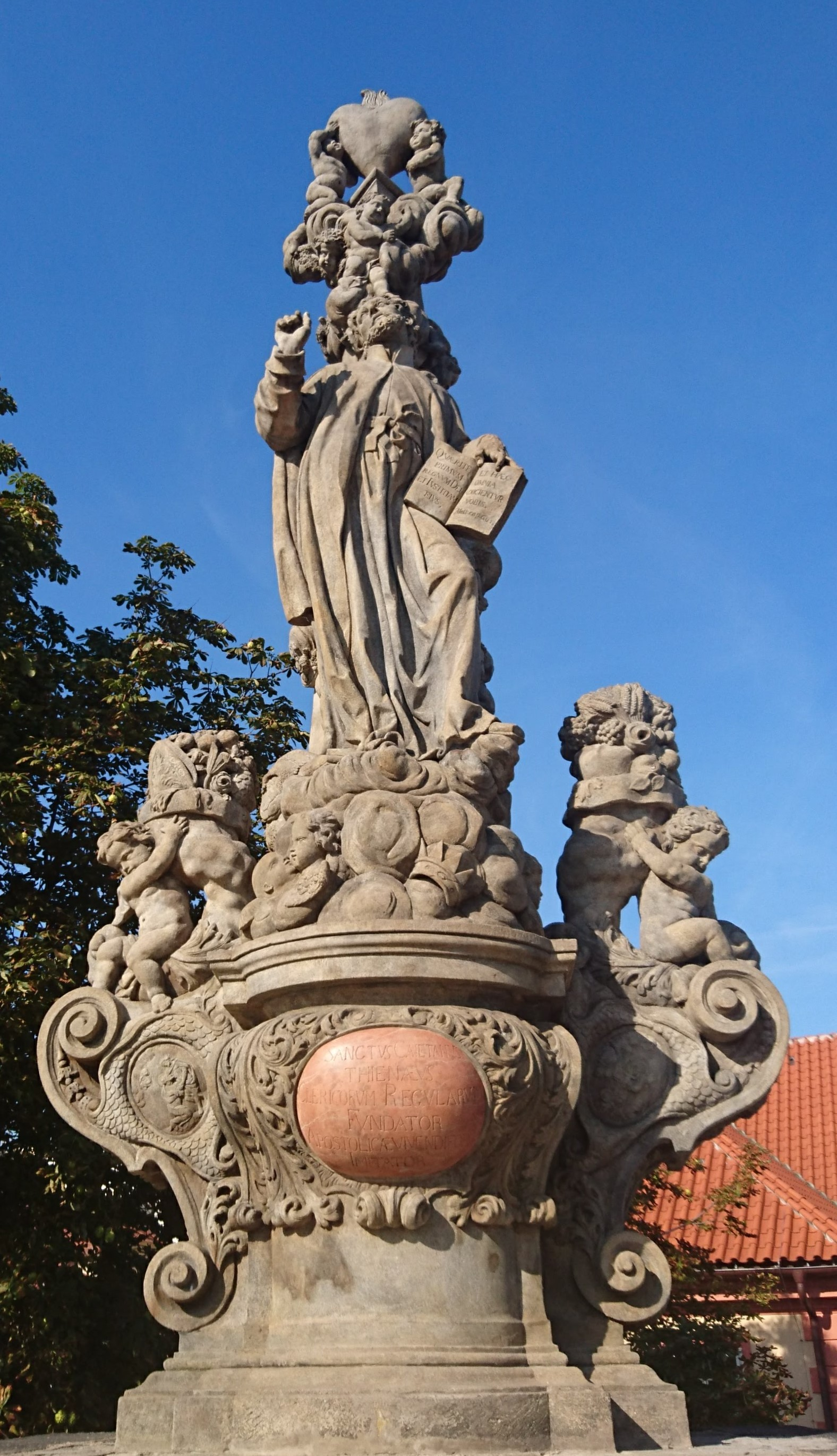
Statue of St. Cajetan

=== Statue of St. Cajetan ===
(socha sv. Kajetána) This statue was sculpted by Ferdinand Brokoff in 1709, and sponsored by the convent of Theatins in Prague. The Saint, founder of the religious order of Theatins, is portrayed holding a book and standing before an obelisk representing the Trinity.

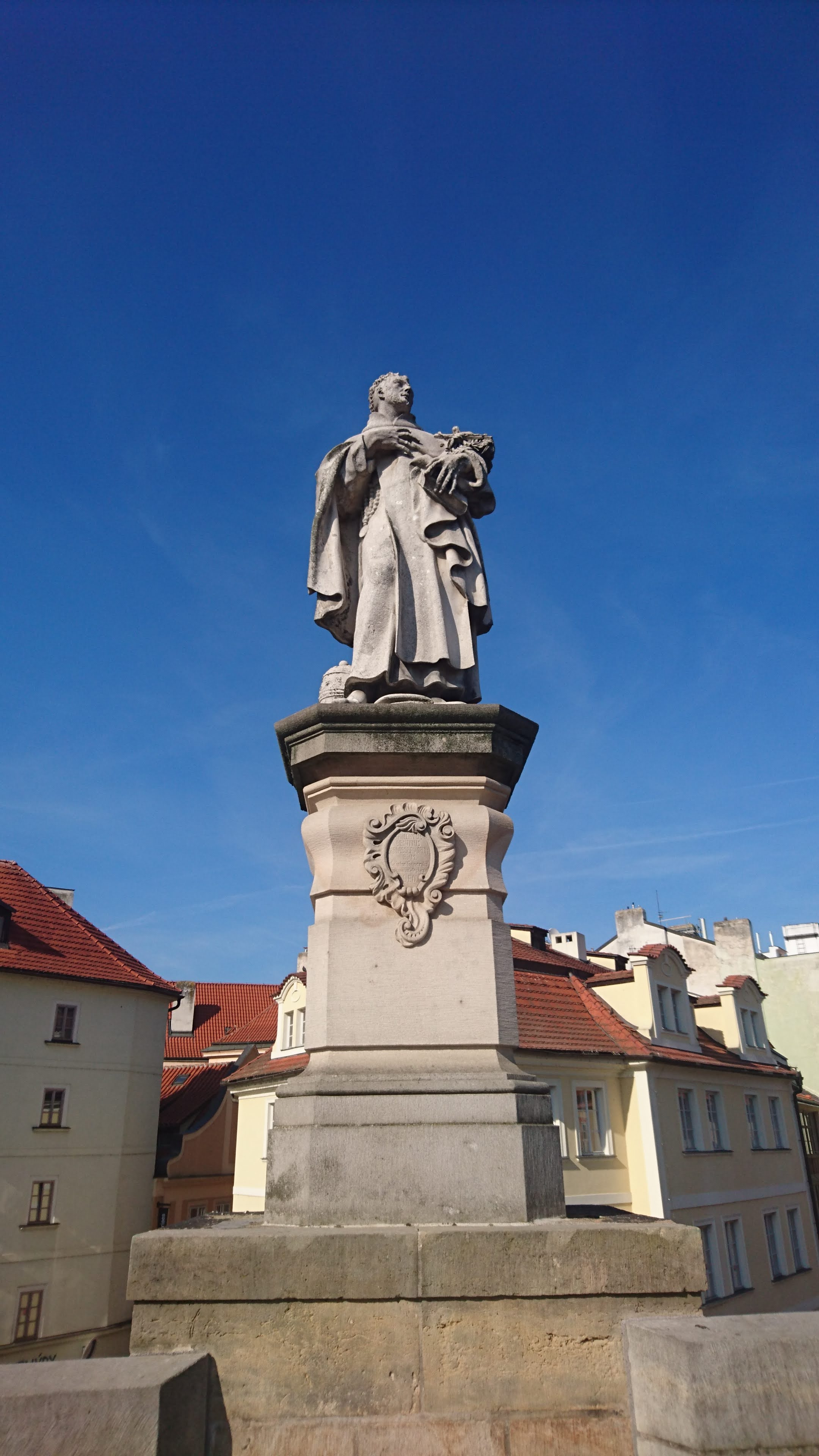
Statue of St. Philip Benitius

=== Statue of St. Philip Benitius ===
(socha sv. Filipa Benicia) Designed by Michal Bernard Mandel in 1714, this statue was made from Salzburg marble and donated by the Servites convent in Prague. The statue portrays St. Philip Benitius, fifth general of the Servites, holding a cross, a book and a spray. By his legs there is the crown of the Pope. A clay model of this statue can be found in the Salzburg museum.

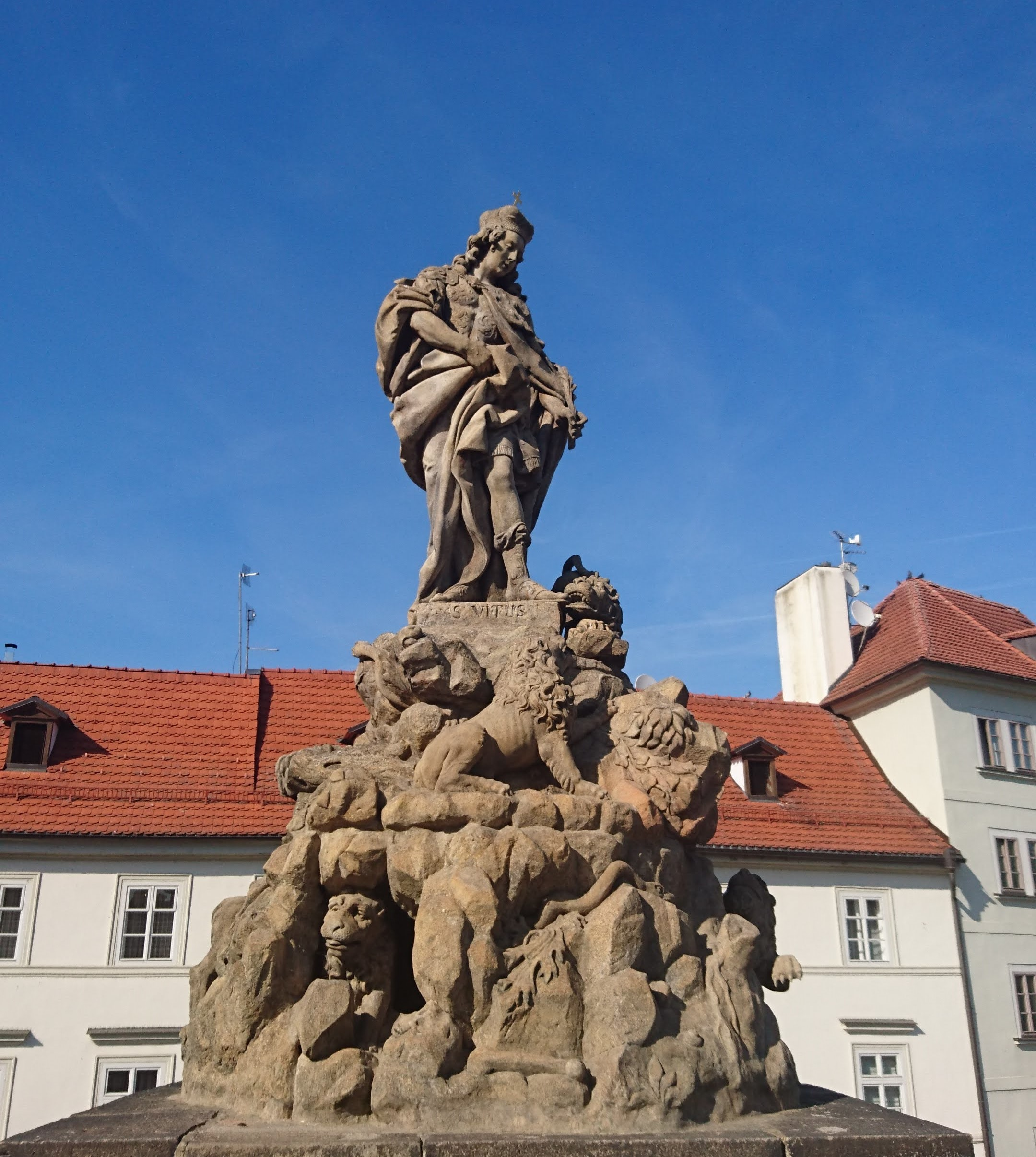

=== Statuary of St. Vitus ===
(socha sv. Víta) Sculpted by Ferdinand Brokoff in 1714, this statue was donated by Matěj Vojtěch Macht of Löwenmacht, the dean of the Vyšehrad canonry. St. Vitus is portrayed standing on a base in the shape of cave, from which lions crawl up. The Saint is depicted as a Roman aristocrat, martyred for his faith. Duke Wenceslas acquired a number of his relics to honor the founding of St. Vitus Cathedral at Prague Castle. These relics, together with others acquired by Charles IV in 1355, are embedded in the cathedral building.

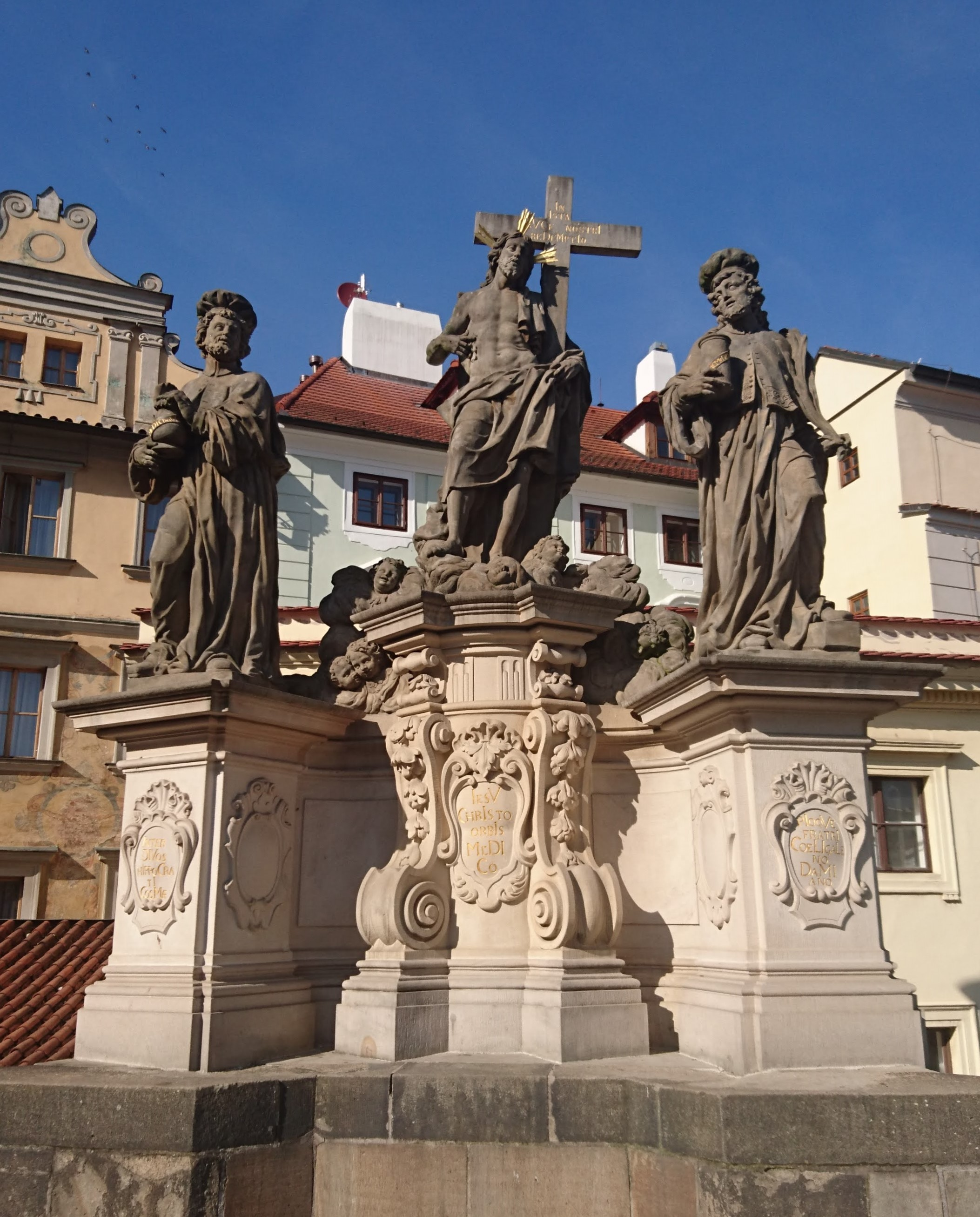
Statue of holy savior with Cosmas and Damian

=== Statue of the Holy Savior with Cosmas and Damian ===
(sousoší sv. Salvatora se sv. Kosmou a Damiánem) Designed by Jan Oldřich Mayer in 1709, at the expense of the faculty of medicine, University of Prague, this statue portrays Jesus with the patron saints of medicine placed on either side.
