= Brokoff =

Brokoff may refer to:

- Jan Brokoff (1652–1718), baroque sculptor
- Michael Brokoff (1686–1721), baroque sculptor, son of Jan Brokoff
- Ferdinand Brokoff (1688–1731), baroque sculptor, son of Jan Brokoff
- 6769 Brokoff, an asteroid
