= Statues of Saints Barbara, Margaret and Elizabeth, Charles Bridge =

Statues in Prague, Czech Republic

Coordinates: 50°05′10″N 14°24′46″E

Statues of Saints Barbara, Margaret and Elizabeth
- Sousoší svaté Barbory, Markéty a Alžběty (Czech)
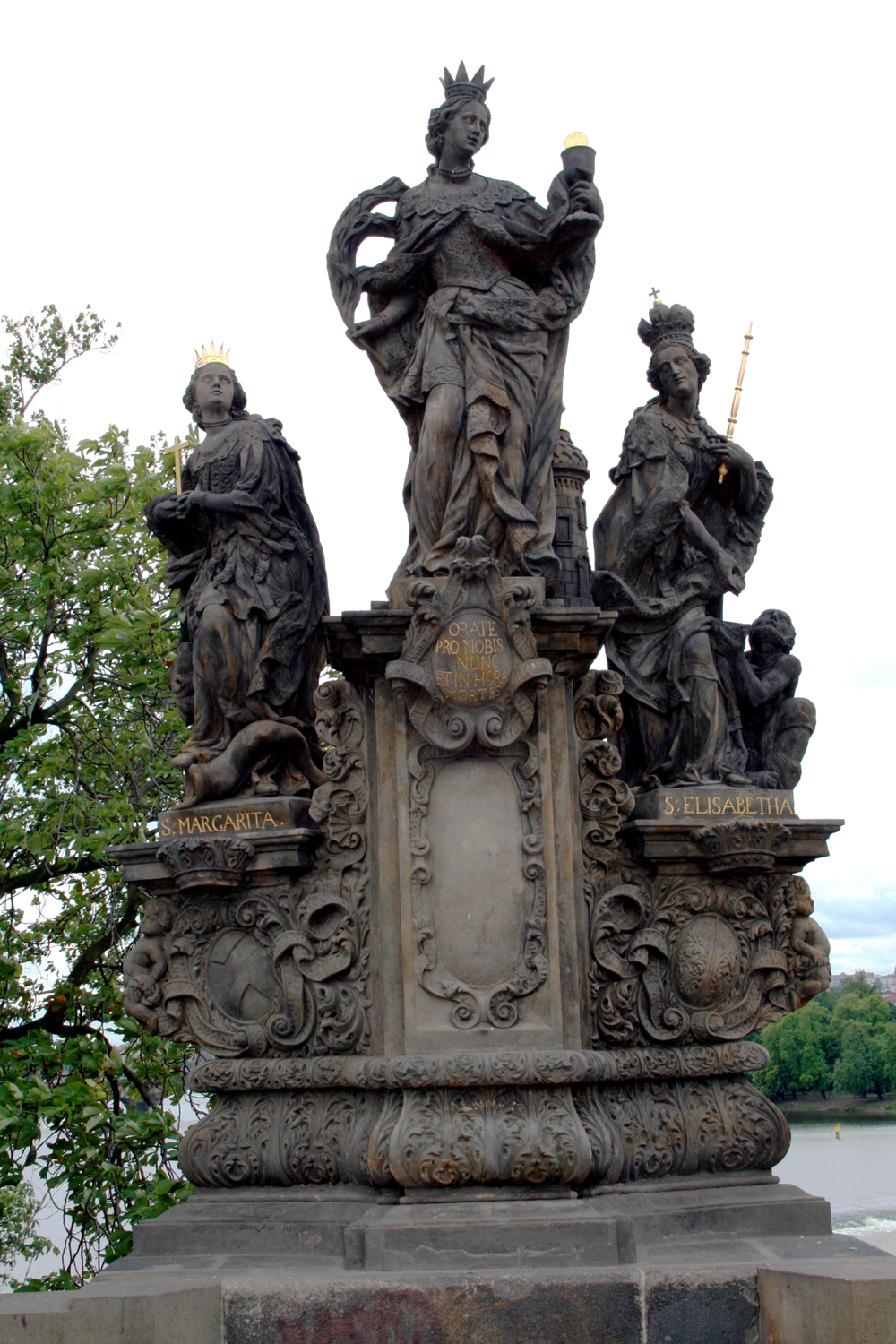
- The statues in 2007
- Artist: Ferdinand Brokoff; Jan Brokoff; Michael Brokoff
- Location: Prague, Czech Republic

The statues of Saints Barbara, Margaret and Elizabeth (Czech: Sousoší svaté Barbory, Markéty a Alžběty) are outdoor sculptures by Ferdinand Brokoff, Jan Brokoff, and Michael Brokoff, installed on the south side of the Charles Bridge in Prague, Czech Republic.
