= Matthias Rauchmiller =

Viennese artist

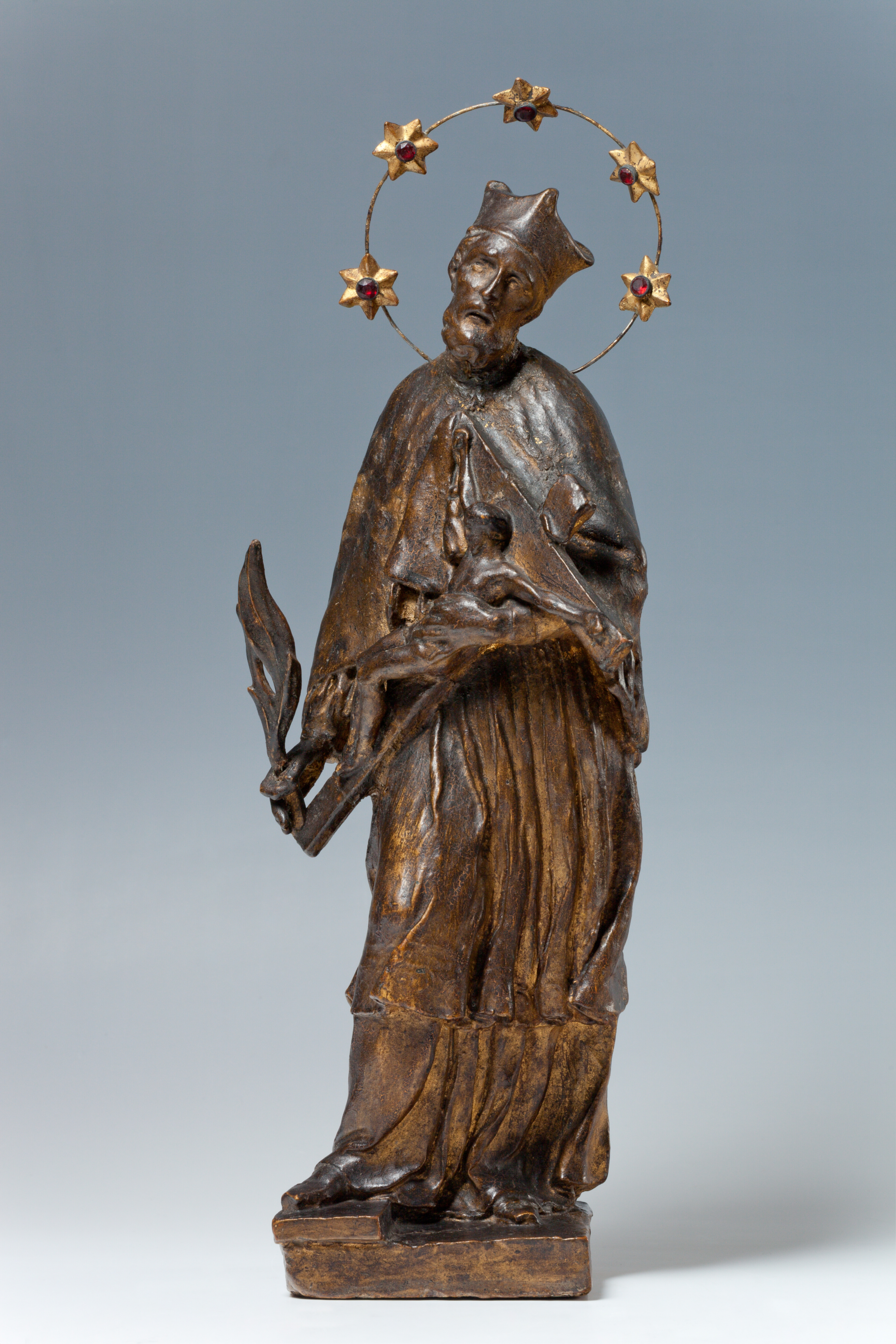
Matthias Rauchmiller's clay model (1681) for the statue of Saint John Nepomuk which was placed on the Charles Bridge in Prague in 1683. Its iconography (bearded priest leaning to one side, wearing biretta, holding crucifix, haloed by five stars) became the archetype for later representations of this saint.

Matthias Rauchmiller (also known as Matthias Rauchmüller) was a painter, sculptor and ivory carver active and influential in Vienna after 1675. Born on 11 January 1645 in Radolfzell (near Lake Constance, in Germany), he died in Vienna on 5 February 1686.

== Life and work ==
Rauchmiller was born in 1645 in Radolfzell, the youngest son of the butcher Mathias Rauchmüller and his wife Agatha Schmid."

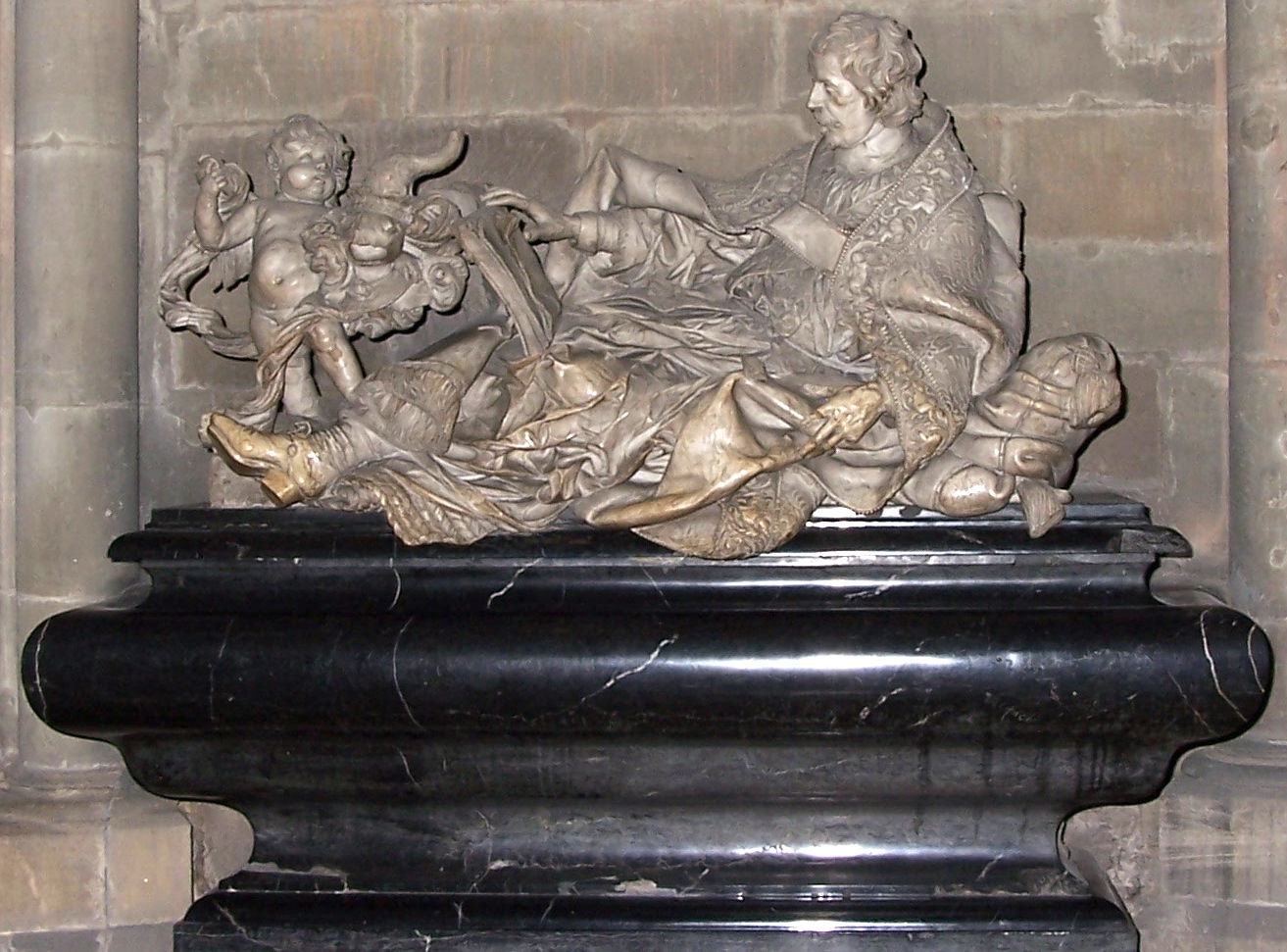
Metternich tomb in the Liebfrauenkirche, Trier, Germany

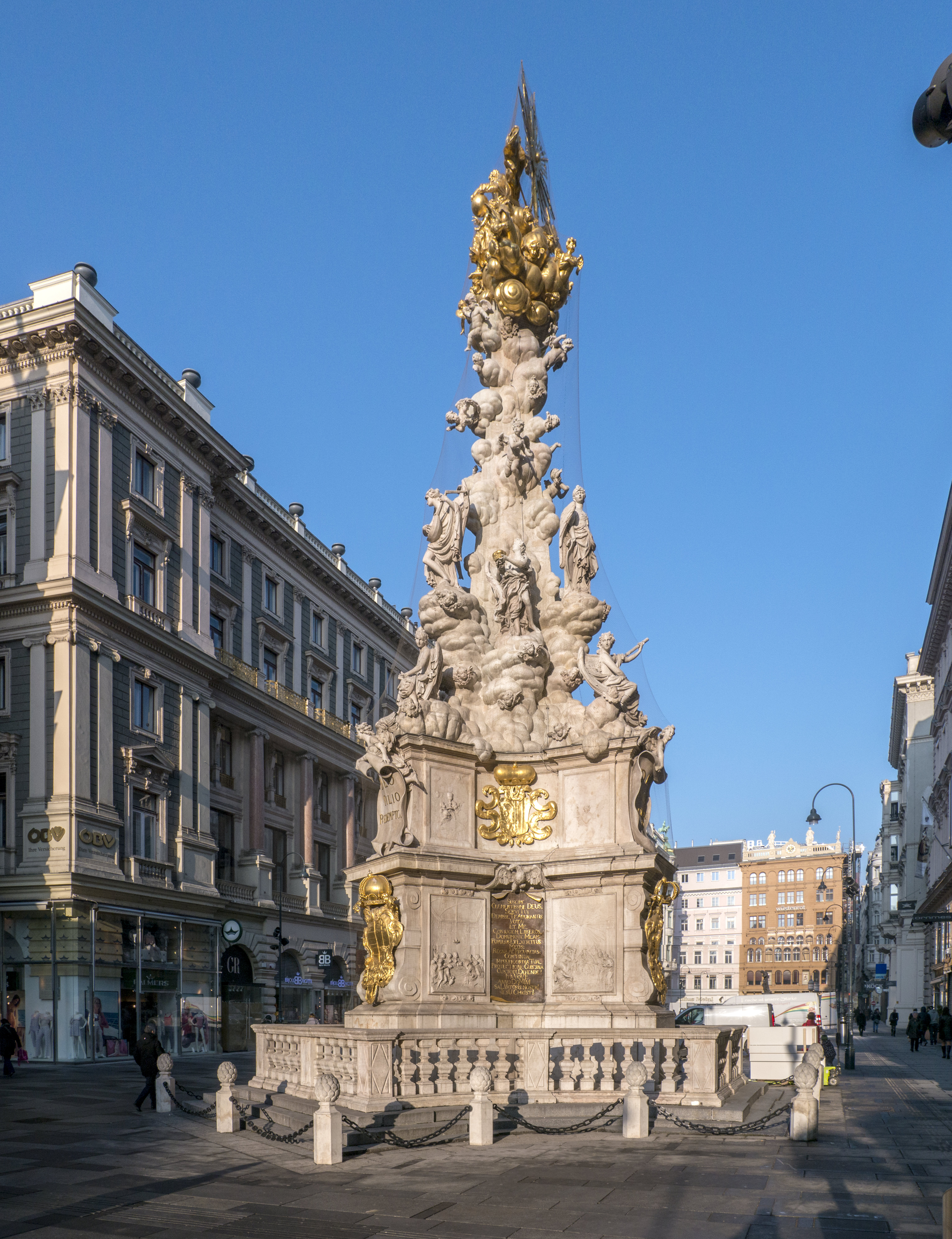
Plague Column in Vienna, based on Rauchmiller's three-sided design

He probably received his earliest artistic training from a sculptor family in nearby Konstanz. During his youth, he also traveled to the Southern Netherlands, where he was influenced by Peter Paul Rubens and his circle, including some whose work has been linked to Rome's greatest Baroque sculptor Gian Lorenzo Bernini.

Rauchmiller worked between 1669 and 1671 in Mainz, where he created a crucifix for the local cathedral. Around 1675 he was commissioned to create a marble tomb for Karl Heinrich von Metternich-Winneburg, who was elected as Archbishop-Elector of Mainz and Bishop of Worms in 1679, but died before he could be consecrated as a bishop. The tomb was erected in the Liebfrauenkirche in Trier, Germany. According to art historian Laura Walew's essay about the tomb, "It is one of the first tombs with a lying figure north of the Alps after the Thirty Years' War." Earlier tombs typically showed the dead person kneeling.

Rauchmiller's Liebfrauenkirche tomb sculpture shows Metternich reclining, reading a book, while a chubby, muscular putto (reminiscent of Rubens) looks on admiringly. According to Walew, "The Metternich tomb gives the impression of a subtle and expressive homage to an intelligent man of strong character."

Some have considered his 1676 ivory tankard with scenes of The Rape of the Sabine Women to be his "masterwork." This tankard is currently in the Princely Collection of Liechtenstein.

In 1679, Rauchmiller was commissioned to design a Vienna monument celebrating the end of an epidemic of bubonic plague; instead of the pillar-shaped "plague column" typical at the time, Rauchmiller conceived a three-sided pyramid, with elaborate sculptured decorations. The monument was later (1694) completed by other artists, but retains Rauchmiler's general design. Three of his sculptures (life-size angels) can also still be seen on the modern plague column in Vienna's Graben.

In 1681 Rauchmiller designed a clay model for the St. John Nepomuk statue, which was installed in 1683 on the Charles Bridge in Prague. The Nepomuk statue was the first of many baroque statues of saints now on the bridge. Rauchmiller's clay model (still on display in the National Gallery of Prague) was executed in wood by sculptor Jan Brokoff, and then cast in bronze by Hieronymus Herold, a bell-maker of Nuremberg. The iconography of Rauchmiller's bozzetto inspired iconography of the saint into the 19th century.
