= Statue of John of Nepomuk, Charles Bridge =

Statue in Prague, Czech Republic

Statue of John of Nepomuk
- Socha svatého Jana Nepomuckého (Czech)
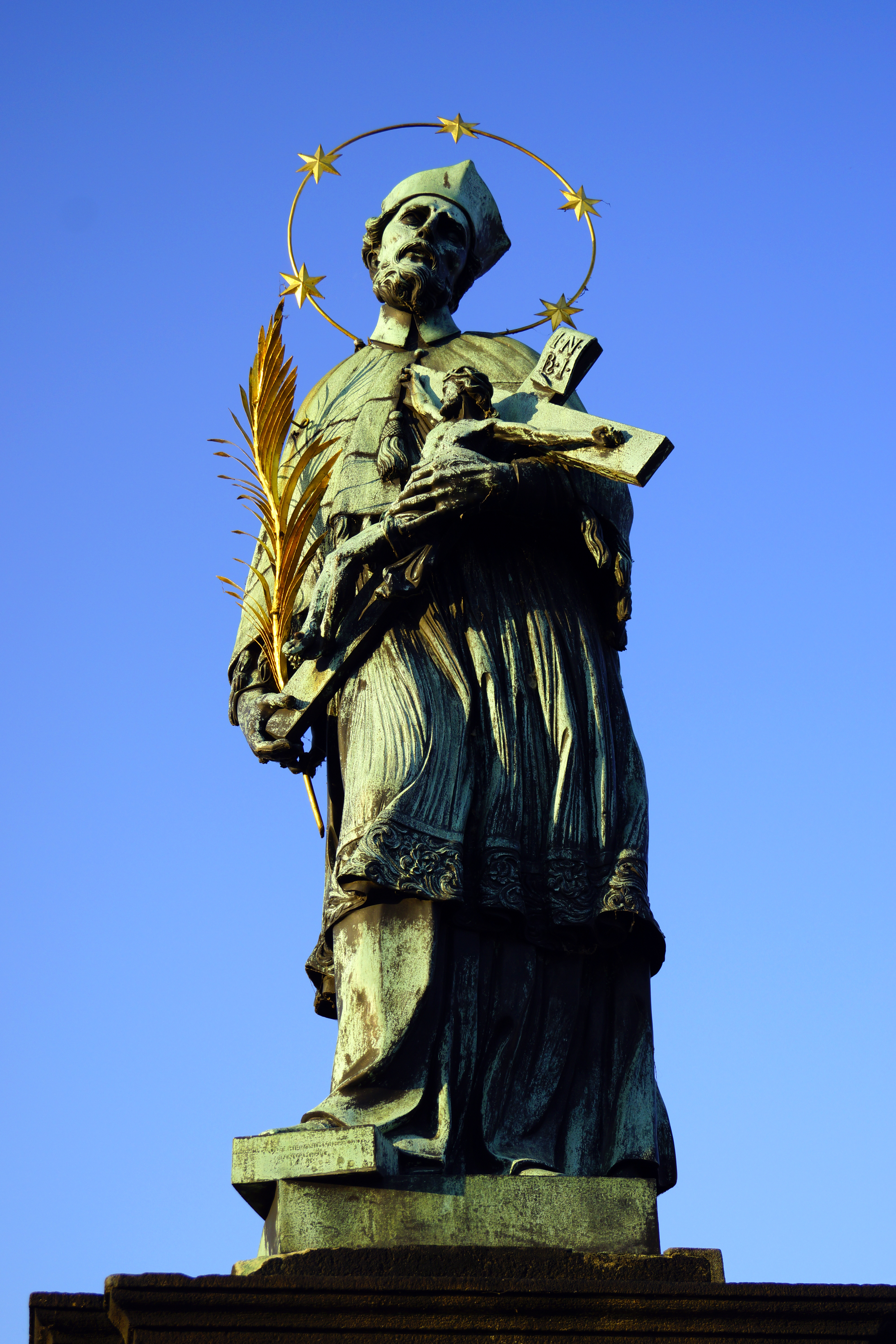
- The statue in 2012
- Artist: Jan Brokoff
- Type: Sculpture
- Subject: John of Nepomuk
- Location: Prague, Czech Republic; 50.08668°N 14.41025°E

The statue of John of Nepomuk (Czech: Socha svatého Jana Nepomuckého) is an outdoor sculpture, installed in 1683 on the north side of the Charles Bridge in Prague, Czech Republic. It was the first of the many Baroque images of saints to be installed on the bridge.

== Description and history ==
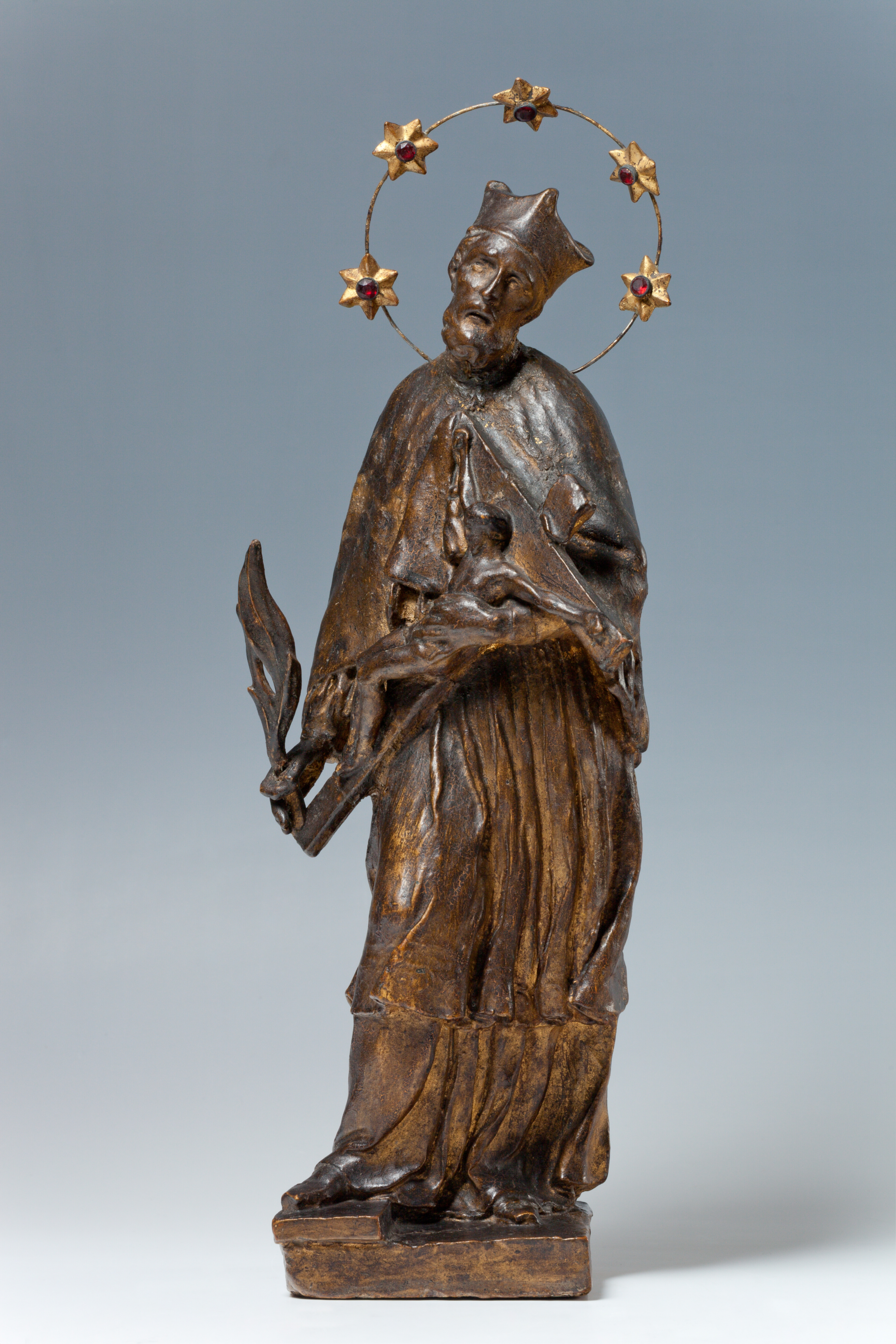
Matthias Rauchmiller's clay model (1681) for the statue of St John of Nepomuk which was placed Charles Bridge in Prague in 1683. Its iconography (bearded priest leaning to one side, wearing biretta, holding crucifix, haloed by five stars) became the archetype for later representations of this saint.

The bronze statue is based on a clay model made in 1681 by Matthias Rauchmiller. The sculptor Jan Brokoff created a large wooden sculpture based on Rauchmiller's model, which was then cast in bronze in Nuremberg.

Rauchmiller's clay model is now in the collection of the National Gallery of Prague.

Brokoff's wooden statue (gilded) has been displayed on the altar of Prague's Church of St. John of Nepomuk On the Rock since 1819.
