= Michael Brokoff =

Michael Johann Joseph Brokoff (Czech: Michal Jan Josef Brokoff; 28 April 1686 – 8 September 1721) was a sculptor of the Baroque era from Bohemia, working with sandstone.

== Biography ==
Michael Brokoff was born in Klášterec nad Ohří as the oldest son of Jan Brokoff, also a sculptor, and apprenticed in his workshop at first. Later he continued his education by Filip Ondřej Quitainer and possibly also Jan Oldřich Mayer, two distinct sculptors and carvers of the time. After his father's death he took over his workshop for a short time in 1718. He is said to surpass the work of his father by technical excellency although he never achieved the supreme style of his younger brother Ferdinand Brokoff, to whom he forwarded leading of the family workshop.

Many important sculptures are attributed to him, at least as a co-author: the statue of St. Adalbert of Prague from 1709 on Charles Bridge, Prague (in collaboration with his brother Ferdinand), statue of St. Ludmila at Vyšehrad, Prague, Herculius at the garden of the Kolowrat Palace in Prague, statuary of Virgin Mary in Police nad Metují, etc.

In contrast to his brother, Michael Brokoff's work is said to be "less exacting"; the expression of the statues is concentrated into the mimics of the heads, with the gestures of the body somewhat tense.

Brokoff died on 8 September 1721 in Prague, at the age of 35.
