= List of public art in Prague =

List of public artworks in Prague, Czech Republic

Public artworks on display in Prague include:

- Babies (Černý)
- Bust of Václav Štulc
- Ctirad and Šárka
- František Palacký Monument, Prague
- Head of Franz Kafka
- Holy Trinity Column, Malá Strana
- Jan Hus Memorial
- Josef Dobrovský Monument
- Kohl's Fountain
- Kranner's Fountain
- Libuše and Přemysl
- Lumír and Píseň
- Marian column Old Town Square
- Memorial to the Victims of Communism
- Obelisk (Prague Castle)
- Piss (Černý)
- Polibek (Petřín)
- Réva
- Slavín
- Stalin Monument (Prague)
- Statue of Alois Jirásek, Prague
- Statue of Bedřich Smetana, Prague
- Statue of Charles IV, Křižovnické Square
- Statue of Franz Kafka
- Statue of Jan Neruda, Prague
- Statue of Jaroslav Hašek
- Statue of John of Nepomuk, Vyšehrad
- Statue of John the Baptist, Maltézské Square
- Statue of Josef Jungmann
- Statue of Judah Loew ben Bezalel
- Statue of Karel Havlíček Borovský, Prague
- Statue of Mikuláš Karlach
- Statue of Milan Rastislav Štefánik, Prague
- Statue of Saint George, Prague Castle
- Statue of Saint Joseph, Charles Square
- Statue of Saint Procopius (Vyšehrad)
- Statue of Saint Sebastian (Vyšehrad)
- Statue of Saint Wenceslas (Bendl)
- Statue of Saint Wenceslas (Vosmík)
- Statue of Saint Wenceslas, Wenceslas Square
- Statue of Taras Shevchenko, Smíchov
- Statue of Tomáš Garrigue Masaryk, Prague
- Trigae (National Theatre)
- Vítězslav Hálek Memorial
- Wimmer's Fountain
- Winged Lion Memorial
- Woodrow Wilson Monument
- Wrestling Titans
- Youth
- Záboj and Slavoj
- Znovuzrození

== Charles Bridge ==
Statues on Charles Bridge include:

- Calvary, Charles Bridge
- Statue of Adalbert of Prague, Charles Bridge
- Statue of Anthony of Padua, Charles Bridge
- Statue of Augustine of Hippo, Charles Bridge
- Statue of Bruncvík, Charles Bridge
- Statue of Francis Borgia, Charles Bridge
- Statue of Francis of Assisi, Charles Bridge
- Statue of Francis Xavier, Charles Bridge
- Statue of Ivo of Kermartin, Charles Bridge
- Statue of John of Nepomuk, Charles Bridge
- Statue of John the Baptist, Charles Bridge
- Statue of Jude the Apostle, Charles Bridge
- Statue of Lutgardis, Charles Bridge
- Statue of Nicholas of Tolentino, Charles Bridge
- Statue of Philip Benizi de Damiani, Charles Bridge
- Statue of Pietà, Charles Bridge
- Statue of Saint Anne, Charles Bridge
- Statue of Saint Cajetan, Charles Bridge
- Statue of Saint Christopher, Charles Bridge
- Statue of Saint Joseph, Charles Bridge
- Statue of Saint Ludmila, Charles Bridge
- Statue of Vitus, Charles Bridge
- Statue of Wenceslaus I, Charles Bridge
- Statues of John of Matha, Felix of Valois and Saint Ivan, Charles Bridge
- Statues of Madonna and Saint Bernard, Charles Bridge
- Statues of Madonna, Saint Dominic and Thomas Aquinas, Charles Bridge
- Statues of Saints Barbara, Margaret and Elizabeth, Charles Bridge
- Statues of Saints Cosmas and Damian, Charles Bridge
- Statues of Saints Cyril and Methodius, Charles Bridge
- Statues of Saints Norbert, Wenceslaus and Sigismund
- Statues of Saints Vincent Ferrer and Procopius, Charles Bridge
