= Triga =

Triga may refer to:

- TRIGA, a class of small nuclear reactor
- Triga (chariot), an ancient three-horse chariot
- Triga Films, a United Kingdom based gay pornography studio
- Giacomo Triga (1674-1746), Italian painter
- Triga, sculpture in Knightsbridge, London, England, UK; see List of public art in Knightsbridge

== See also ==
- Trigae (National Theatre), Prague, Czechia; a set of sculptures
- wild triga (Thinopyrum intermedium), a type of wheatgrass
- Trigga (disambiguation)
