= St Thomas' Church, Prague =

Church in Prague

Coordinates: 50°5′19″N 14°24′21″E

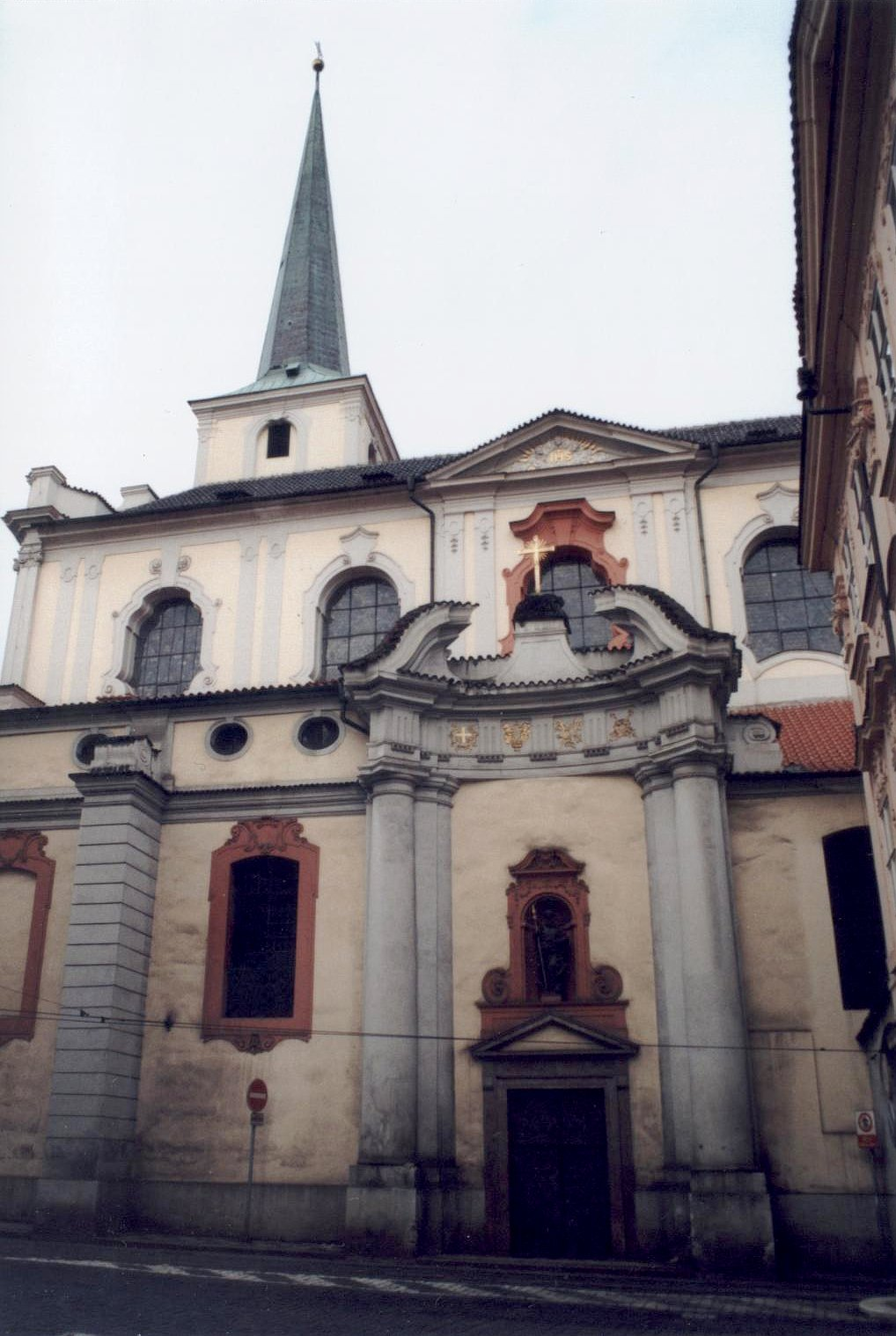
St Thomas' Church, Prague

Saint Thomas Church (Czech: Kostel svatého Tomáše) is an Augustinian church in Malá Strana, Prague, Czech Republic. The address is at Josefská 8. The church is easily recognisable in the Prague skyline. Saint Thomas' Church stands within the vicinity of both Saint Nicholas' Church and the Castle of Prague. In 2003, Saint Thomas Church celebrated its 775 anniversary.

== History ==
The original Church of St. Thomas and its adjoining Chapel of St. Dorothy was constructed in the Romanesque style sometime before 1227 by Benedictine monks from Břevnov Monastery. In 1285 , the property was given to the Augustinian friars. Václav II and his wife Guta built for them a Gothic church on the site of a previous church. A monastery, built next to the church, served as a house of studies for members of the order. The church was consecrated in 1379. The monastery was burned down and the church damaged in 1420 during the Hussite Wars; restoration was delayed for a time by lack of funds. After an accidental fire in 1541, the church and monastery were once again rebuilt during the reign of Rudolf II. St. Thomas served as both a parish church and as Prague's pro-cathedral. It subsequently suffered another fire during which the church gallery collapsed.

In 1708, the Augustinians at St. Thomas commissioned Jan Bedřich Kohl to design the statue of Saint Augustine for the Charles Bridge. Toward the end of the nineteenth century, the Church was restored on the occasion of its 600 year anniversary. The monastery brewed beer until 1951.

== Architecture ==
=== Exterior ===
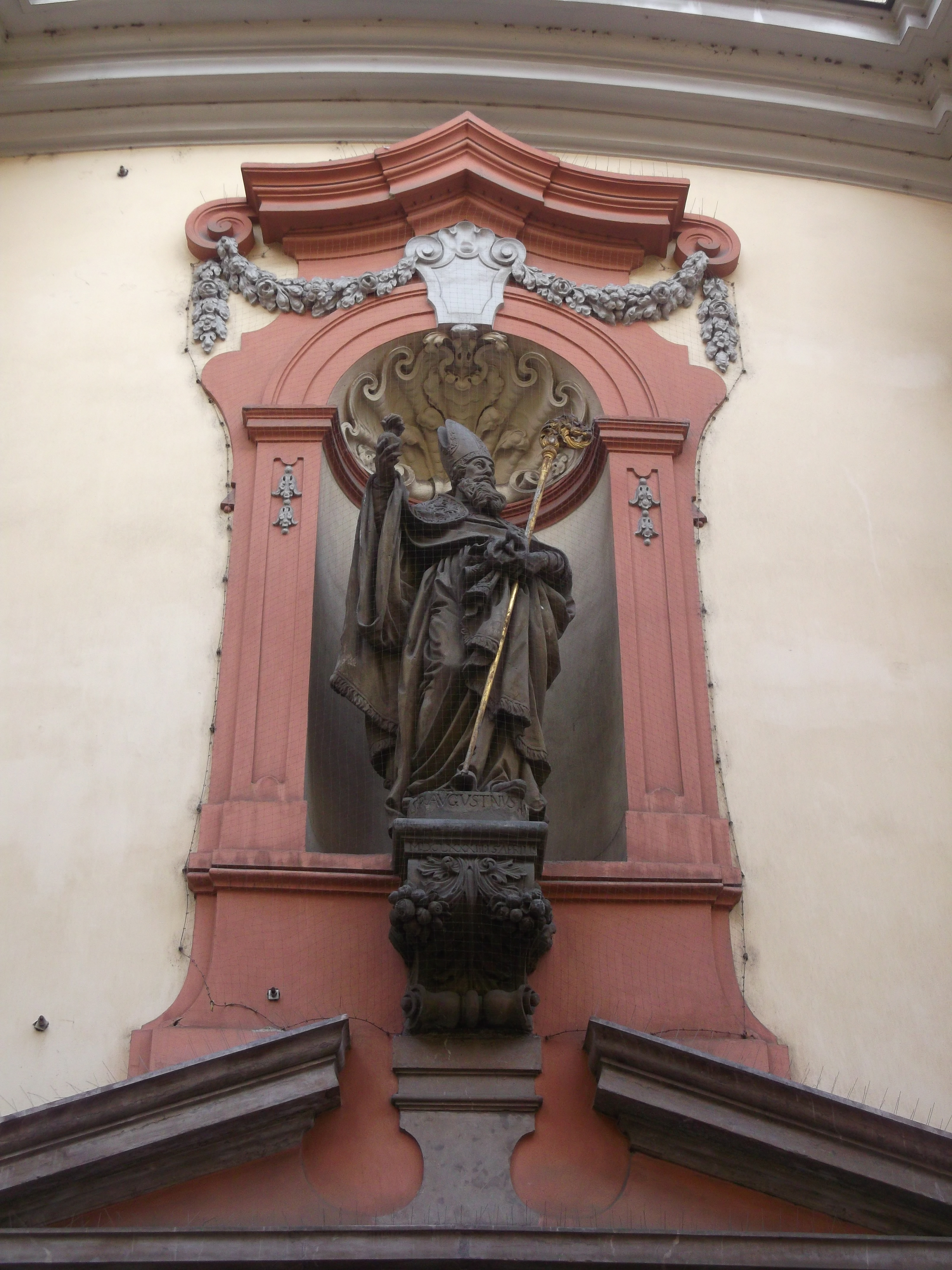
St. Augustin, front facade

After a fire caused by a lightning strike, the church was rebuilt in 1725 in baroque style, according to a design by Kilian Ignaz Dientzenhofer. It features a dome on top of the nave and a bell tower topped with slender spire on the front facade of the structure. To save expense, Dientzenhofer retained the Renaissance portals. Kohl carved a statue of St. Augustine for the niche above the main portal.

=== Interior ===
Frescoes by Václav Vavřinec Reiner, depicting the scenes from the life of St. Augustine, adorn the ceiling of the nave, along with three over the chancel on the life of St. Thomas. The wooden carvings of SS. Augustine, Monica, and Ludmila are by Ferdinand Brokoff.

The chancel contains an altar dedicated to Saint Sebastian with a painting depicting his martyrdom by Bartholomeus Spranger. The altarpiece above Saint Roch's altar is by Franz Xaver Palko. There are altarpieces by Karel Škréta of the Holy Trinity, the Assumption of the Virgin Mary, and Thomas of Villanova, and in the side aisle statues of St. Roch and Sebastian by Johann Georg Bendl.

== Burials ==
It is the burial place of Butautas Kęstutaitis, the son of Kęstutis, Grand Duke of Lithuania. His brother Grand Duke Vytautas donated a large carpet to the church. The sculptor Adriaen de Vries is also buried in St. Barbara's Chapel in the crypt. A fountain designed by him is in the Italian garden of nearby Wallenstein Palace. Also buried at St. Thomas is the noted engraver Aegidius Sadeler, Spanish ambassador Guillen de San Clemente, and the English-Czech poet, Elizabeth Jane Weston.

== Present day ==
In 1637, Peter Paul Rubens painted The Martyrdom of St Thomas for the high altar. Two years later, he did a painting of Saint Augustine. They were moved to the National Gallery Prague. Those above the main altar are copies.

Masses are celebrated in Czech, English, Spanish, and Filipino.

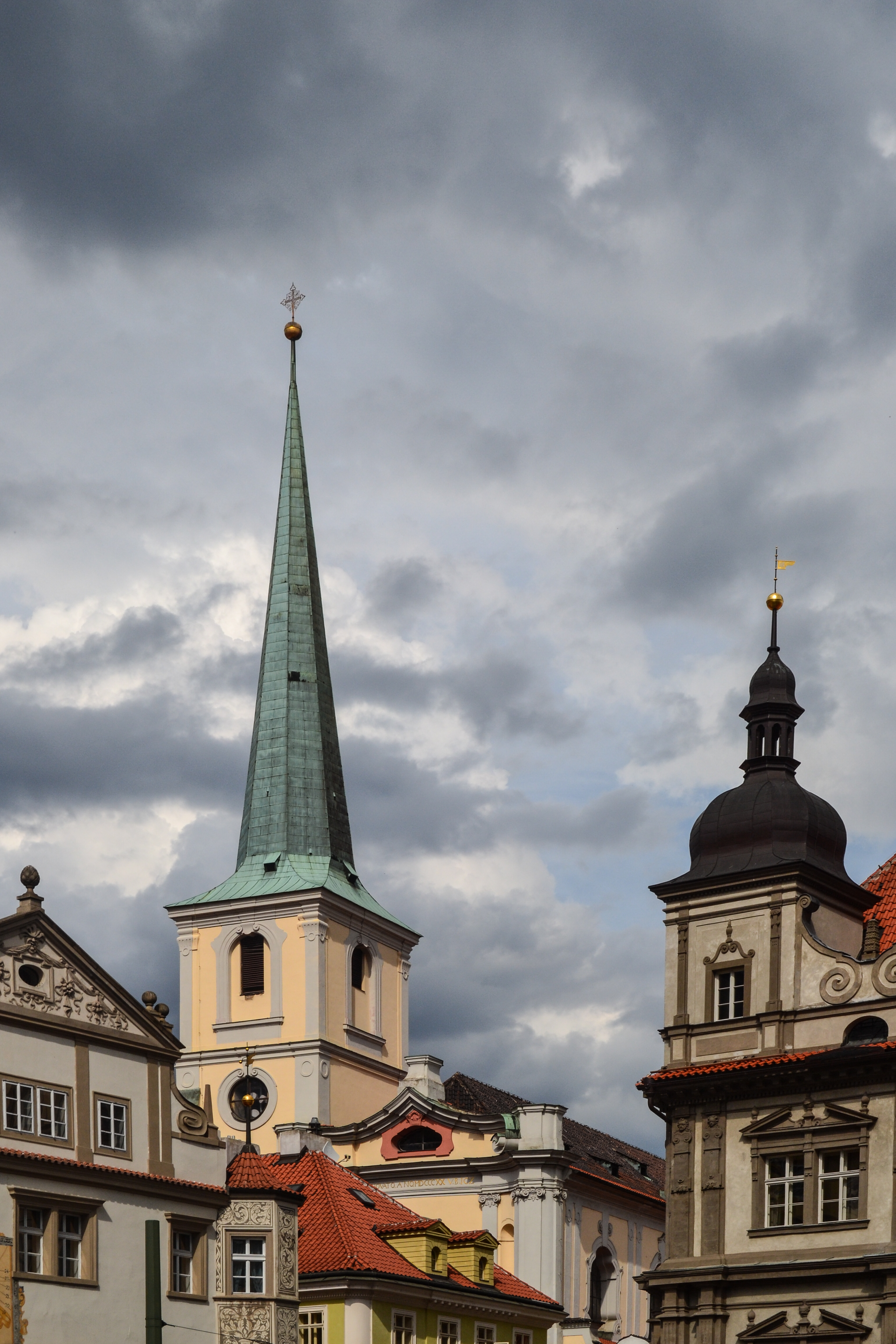
The bell tower of Saint Thomas' Church, Prague

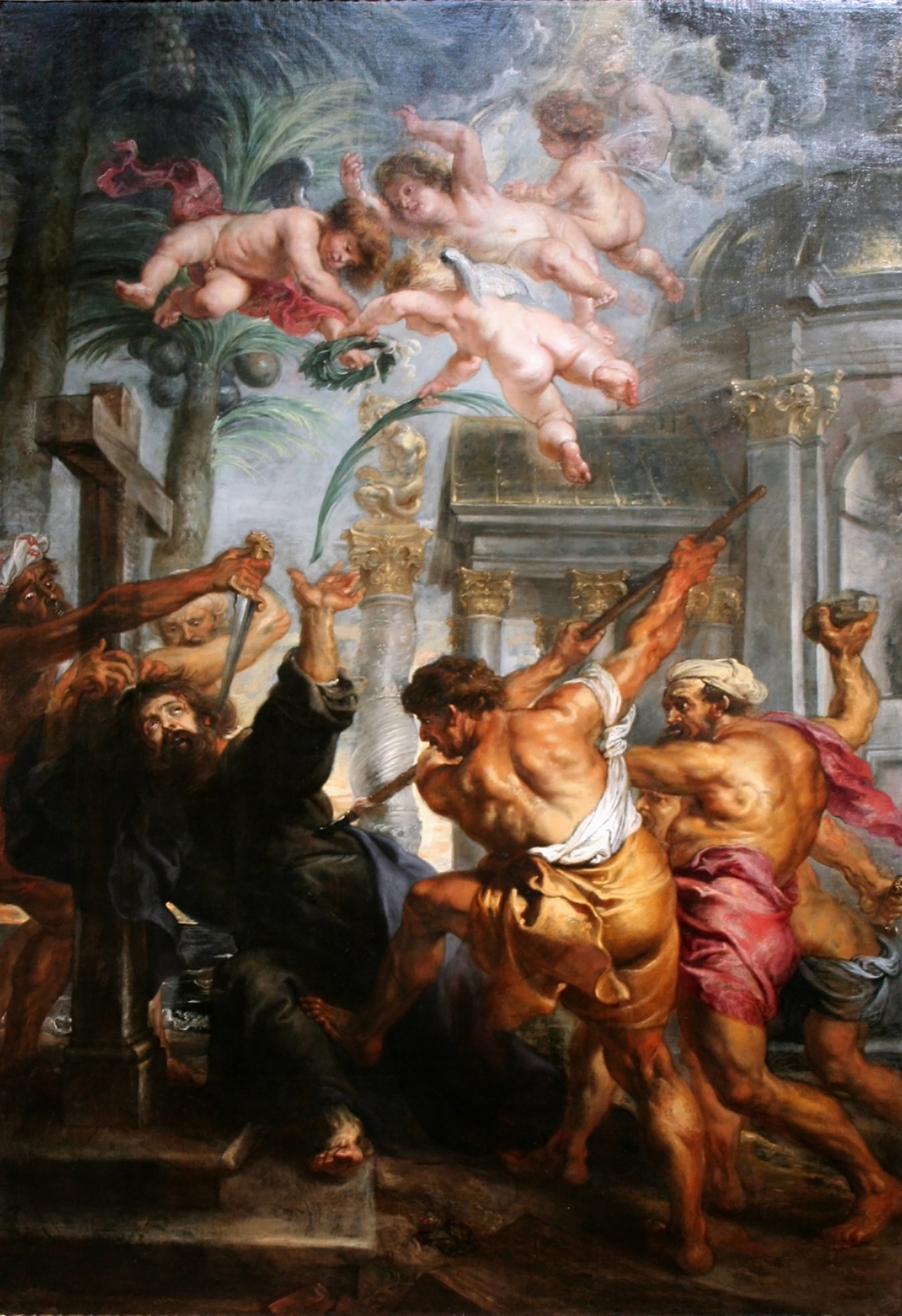
Rubens: Martyrdom of St Thomas

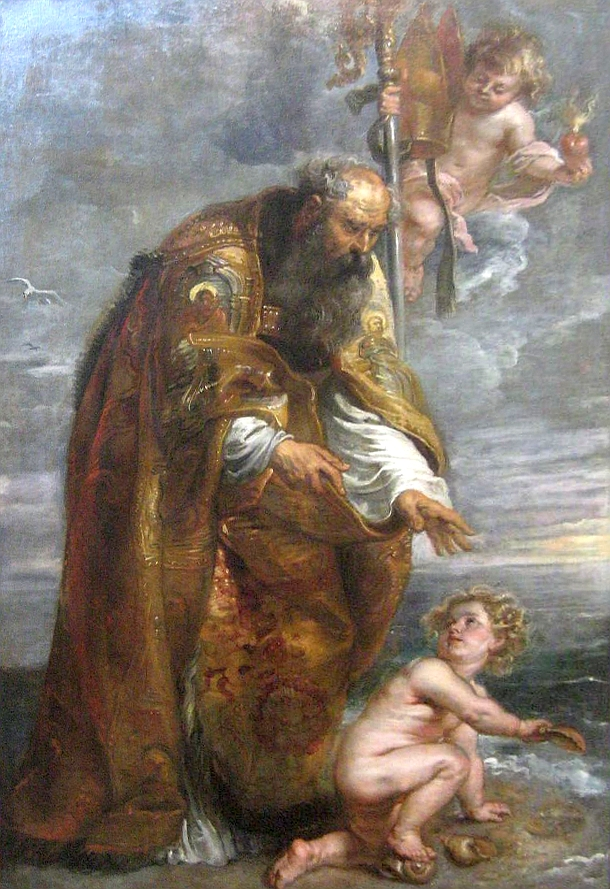
Rubens: St. Augustine

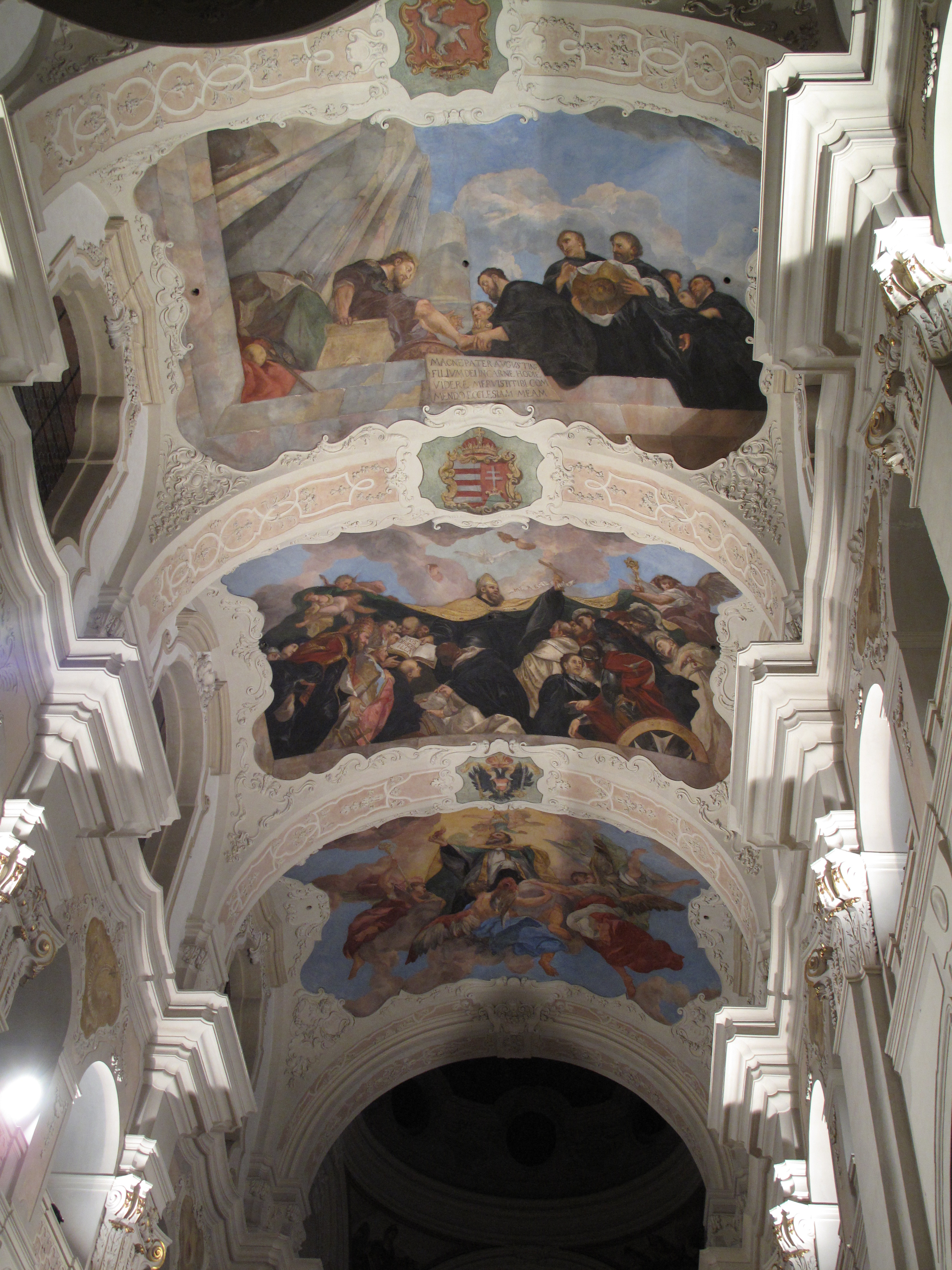
Ceiling frescoes
