= Elizabeth Jane Weston =

English-Czech Neo-Latin poet

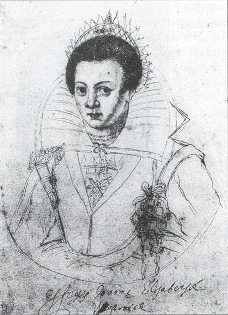
Elizabeth Jane Weston by unknown Dutch artist kept in Hessisches Landesmuseum Darmstadt

Elizabeth Jane Weston (Latin: Elisabetha Ioanna Westonia; Czech: Alžběta Johana Vestonie) (1581 or 1582, in Chipping Norton, Oxfordshire – 23 November 1612, in Prague) was a poet, known for her Neo-Latin poetry. She had the unusual distinction for a woman of the time of having her poetry published. She was born in the Kingdom of England and later moved to Bohemia.

== Biography and early life ==
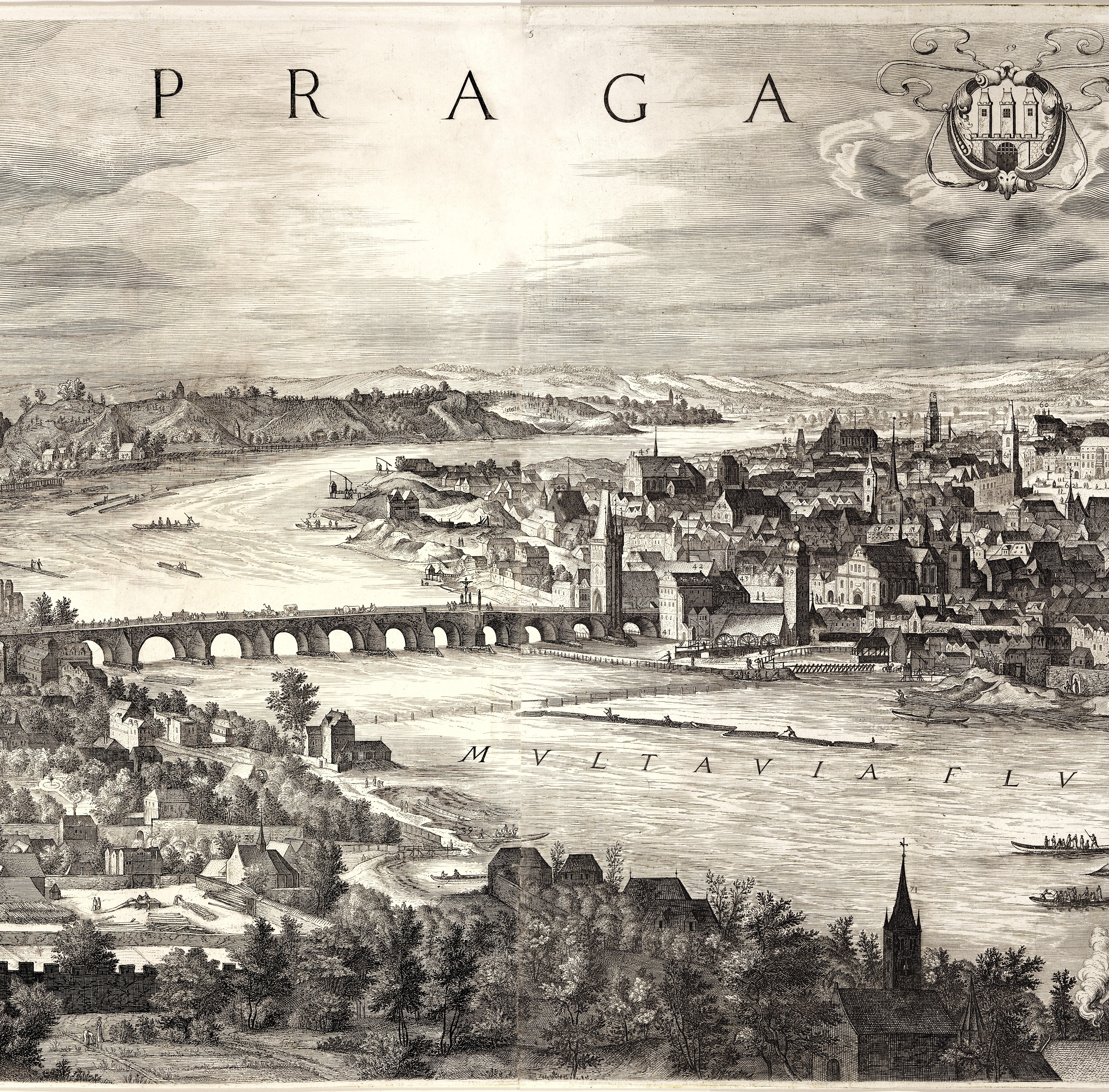
View of Prague's bridge over the Vltava river, 1606. One of Elizabeth Weston's poems was On the flooding of Prague that occurred after continual rains

Weston was born to Joanna Cooper (23 June 1563 in Chipping Norton - 1606) and her first husband, John Weston, about whom almost nothing is known. He died when she was six months old. Soon after, Weston's mother was remarried, to the English renaissance occultist, Edward Kelley, who was a well-known alchemist, and the family left England for Prague in Bohemia. Kelley's interest in alchemical projects drew the attention of the emperor Rudolf II, who became a patron of his work along with that of the alchemist-mathematician John Dee.

Weston was raised in a stable home environment with progressive parents who believed in equal education for their children regardless of sex. Weston's stepfather hired a Latin tutor, John Hammond, for her and she attended university lectures, which led to a formal education. Weston was learned in multiple languages including Czech, English, German, Italian, and Latin.

Early in Weston's adult life, her family fortune turned for the worse. Her stepfather had a falling out of favour with the royal monarch and was imprisoned after being accused of treason. Kelley's imprisonment led Weston to write letters of appeal to the emperor's court. It is not known how much these letters helped her stepfather's sentence.

In 1603, Weston married a jurist, Johannes Leo, with whom she had seven children.

== Weston's work ==
Weston's work gained the attention of many scholars because of her expertise in Latin verse and prose. Among the scholars were Silesian nobles, Georgics Martinius Von Baldhoven and Nicolas Maius, with both of whom she developed friendships. Baldhoven tirelessly supported Weston's work, urging her to publish it. In 1602, Baldhoven published Weston's work, Poemata, in two volumes, out of his own money. The volume included epitaphs, idyllic reveries, odes to Emperor Rudolf II (originally sent to him with the intention of convincing him to lend money), and odes to herself. In 1606, her second volume of work, Parthenicon Libri III, which means "maidenly writings", was published in three volumes. It included epigrams, elegies, letters of appeals to officials, poems about the flood in Prague, and fables of Aesop. This work also includes a large section of an exchange of letters written to and by Weston. Weston made a name for herself by being one of the best neo-Latin poets of her time but also by having her work published in her own name. Weston's writing included secular verse, classical knowledge, myth, history, and occasional verse, and touched on female traits of chastity and modesty.

While not much more is known about Weston's life after these publications, Ballard posits that her husband was still alive in 1605 because of the epistle she wrote, Prague Nonis Marii, which was published the following year.

== Influence ==
During her lifetime, many humanists across Europe, including Jan Dousa, celebrated her poetic achievement. (Note: These are gathered in Cheney and Hosington, pp. 376-437.) Some decades later, John Evelyn praised Weston as, with Sir Thomas More, the best of neo-Latin poets.

== Death and legacy ==
Weston died in 1612, and contemporary epitaphs say she died of consumption (not in childbirth). She is buried in St. Thomas' Church in Malá Strana in Prague.

Weston was known as Virgo Angla, Latin for "the English Maiden". Her work is referred to as Westonia, which is also her own Latin name.

In 2025, the non-profit press Pixelia Publishing published a Latin commentary on Weston's works called Westonia: Selected Works of Elizabeth Jane Weston under Pixelia's Experrecta Series: Women Latin Authors. The Westonia commentary was compiled by students from Bryn Mawr, Haverford, and Swarthmore College students under the mentorship of Haverford's Bret Mulligan.
