= Second courtyard of Prague Castle =

Courtyard at Prague Castle, Czechia

Coordinates: 50.0903°N 14.3991°E

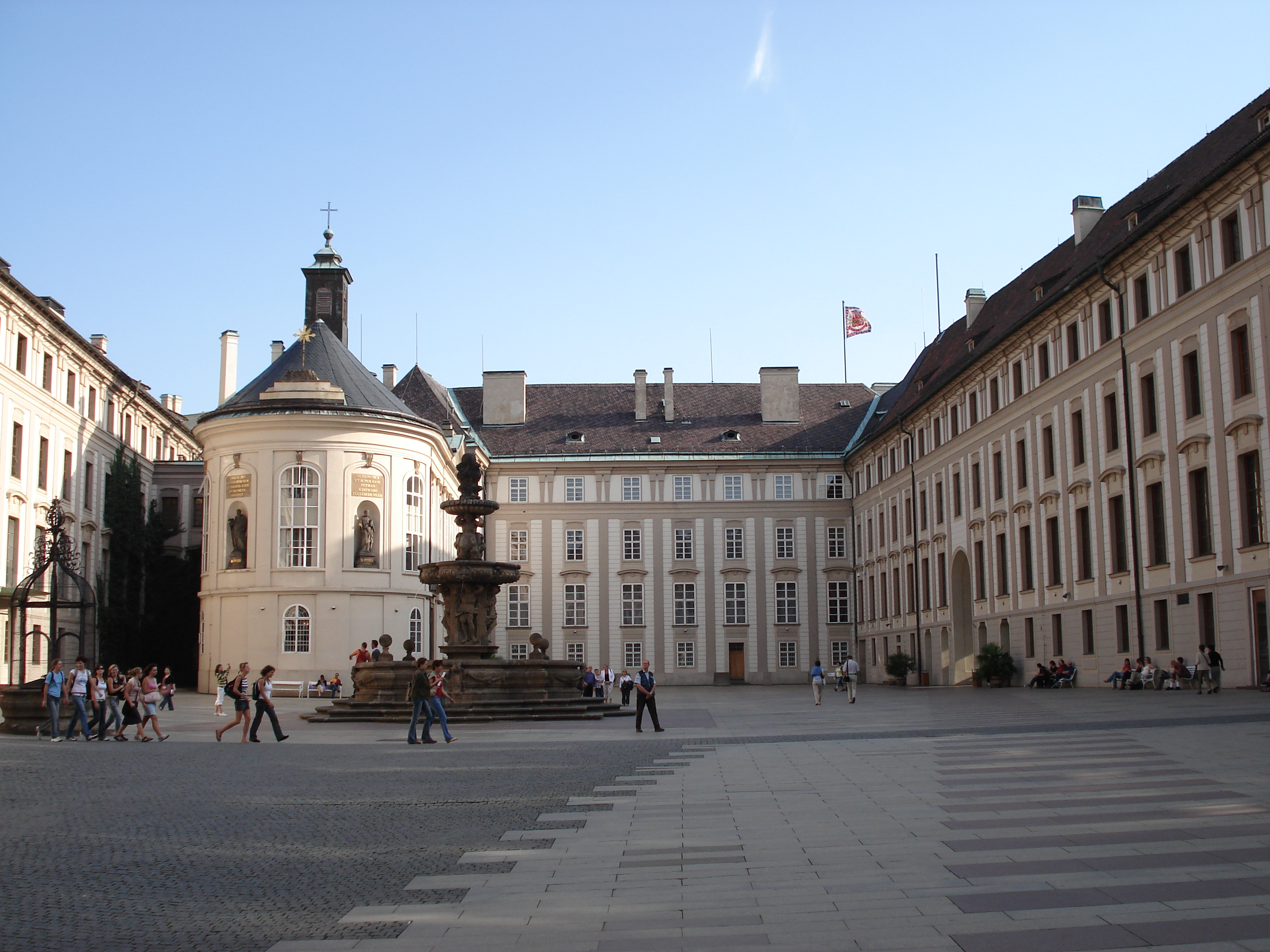
The courtyard in 2006

The second courtyard (Czech: Druhé nádvoří Pražského hradu) is one of four at Prague Castle, in Prague, Czech Republic. It features Kohl's Fountain, St Cross Chapel and a well from the 17th century with a cast iron grille.
