= Hradčany Square =

Square in Prague, Czech Republic

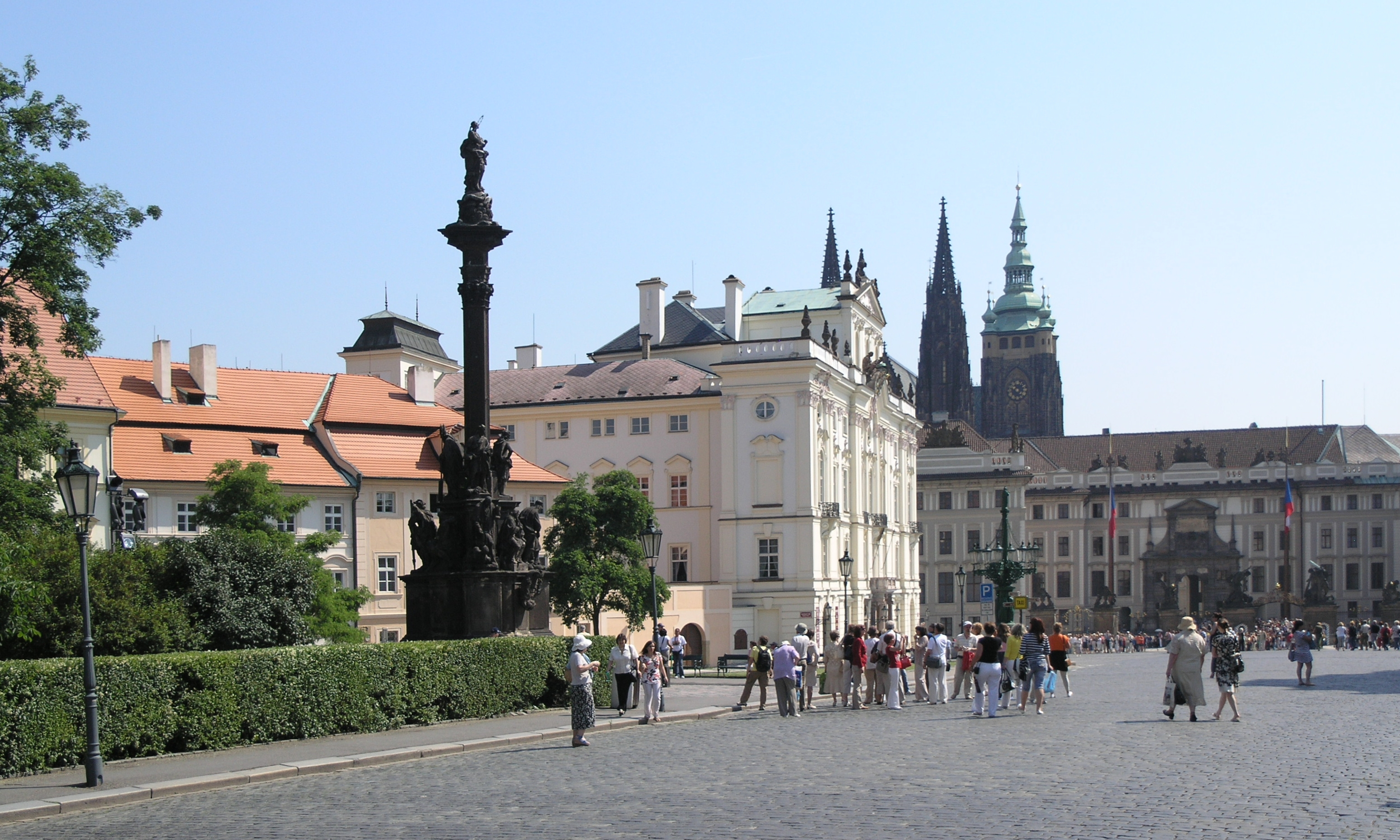
- The square in 2009

- Location within Czech Republic
- Native name: Hradčanské náměstí (Czech)
- Type: Square
- Location: Prague, Czech Republic
- Coordinates: 50°5′22″N 14°23′46″E

Hradčany Square (Czech: Hradčanské náměstí) is a square near Prague Castle in Prague, Czech Republic.

== Features ==
- Statue of Saint Wenceslas (Vosmík)
