= Statue of Tomáš Garrigue Masaryk, Prague =

Statue in Prague, Czech Republic

Statue of Tomáš Garrigue Masaryk
- Socha Tomáše Garrigua Masaryka (Czech)
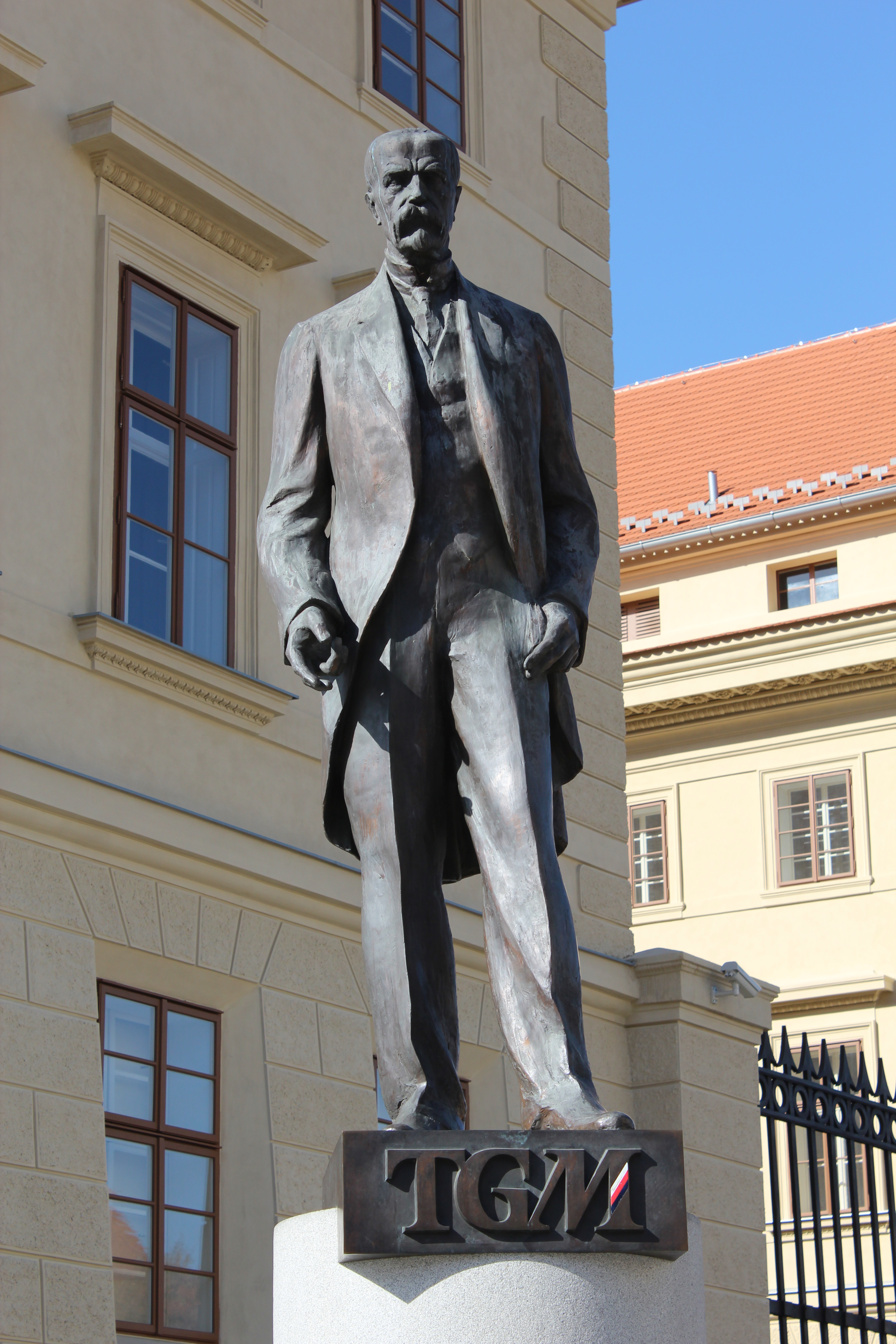
- The statue in 2009
- Year: 2000
- Type: Sculpture
- Medium: Bronze
- Subject: Tomáš Garrigue Masaryk
- Location: Prague, Czech Republic; 50°5′22.16″N 14°23′52.63″E

A bronze sculpture of Tomáš Garrigue Masaryk (Czech: Socha Tomáše Garrigua Masaryka) is installed at Prague Castle in Prague, Czech Republic.

The statue was supported by the Masaryk Democratic Movement, and revealed on 7 March 2000 for Masaryk's 150th birthday anniversary. One of the main personalities who advocated for the building of the monument was Zdeněk Mahler.

== See also ==
- List of public art in Prague
- Statue of Tomáš Garrigue Masaryk (Washington, D.C.)
