= Trigga =

Trigga may refer to:

== People ==
- Trey Songz, American R&B artist popularly known as Trigga
- Trigga tha Gambler, also Trigga, New York rapper
- Trigga, part of crew of Miami-based rapper JT Money
- Trigga, Nigerian rapper on "Koma Roll Remix", Tillaman featuring Iyanya and others
- Lae D-Trigga, rapper on "Never Ending Saga" from Guru album Baldhead Slick & da Click
- Trigga, British MC on Wiley album Race Against Time

== Other uses ==
- Trigga (album), Trey Songz 2014 album

== See also ==
- Trigger (disambiguation)
- Triga (disambiguation)
