= Statue of Pietà, Charles Bridge =

Statue in Prague, Czech Republic

Statue of Pietà
- Sousoší Piety (Czech)
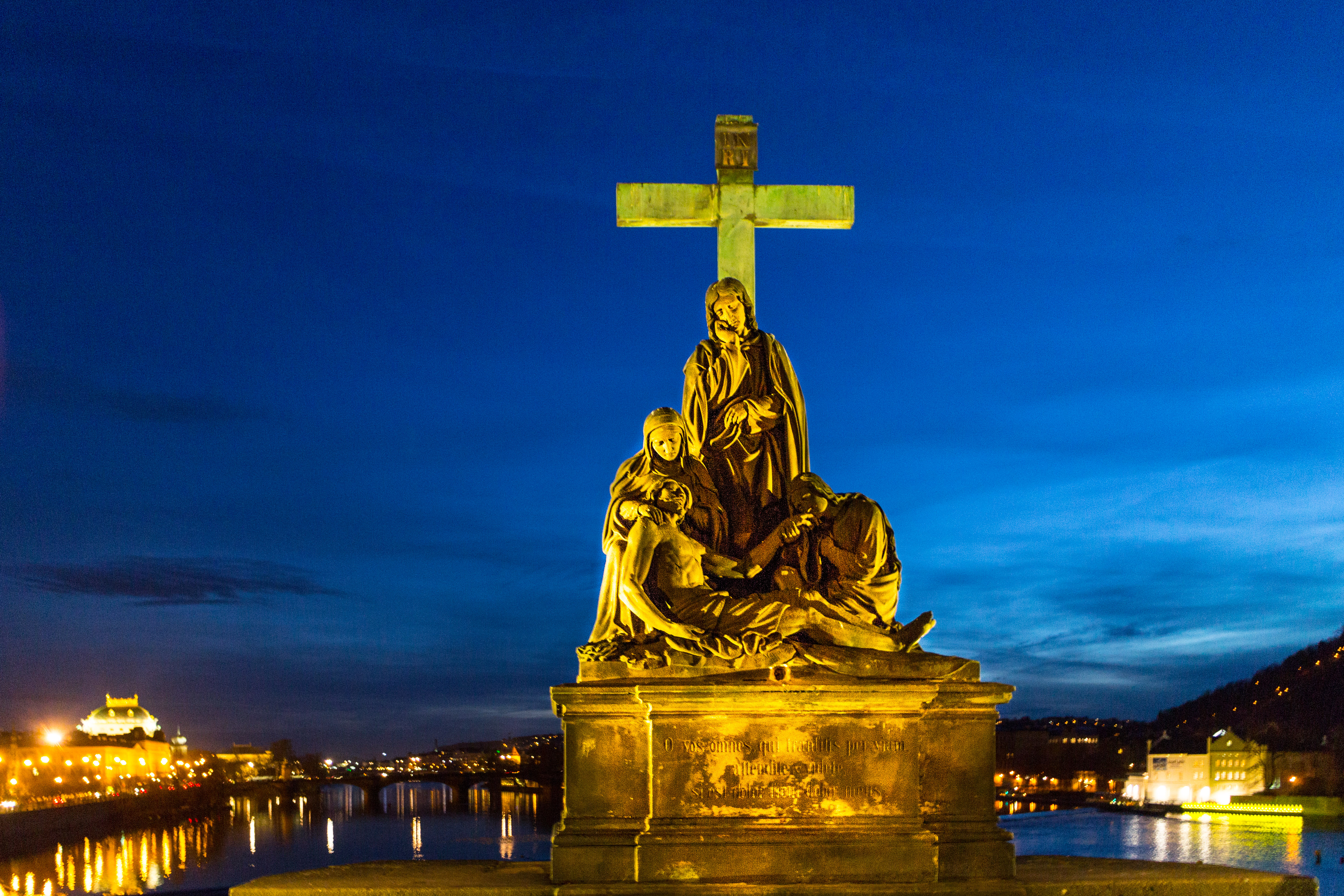
- The statue in 2014
- Artist: Emanuel Max
- Type: Sculpture
- Subject: Pietà
- Location: Prague, Czech Republic; 50°05′11″N 14°24′44″E

The statue of Pietà (Czech: Sousoší Piety) is an outdoor sculpture by Emanuel Max, installed on the south side of the Charles Bridge in Prague, Czech Republic.

The statue is a popular tourist site among fans of English electronic band Depeche Mode. Fans of the band visit the site to re-create a photograph of band members Dave Gahan and Martin Gore by the statue that was taken in 1988 after performing behind the Iron Curtain.
