= Statue of Charles IV, Křižovnické Square =

Statue in Prague, Czech Republic

Statue of Charles IV
- Socha Karla IV. (Czech)
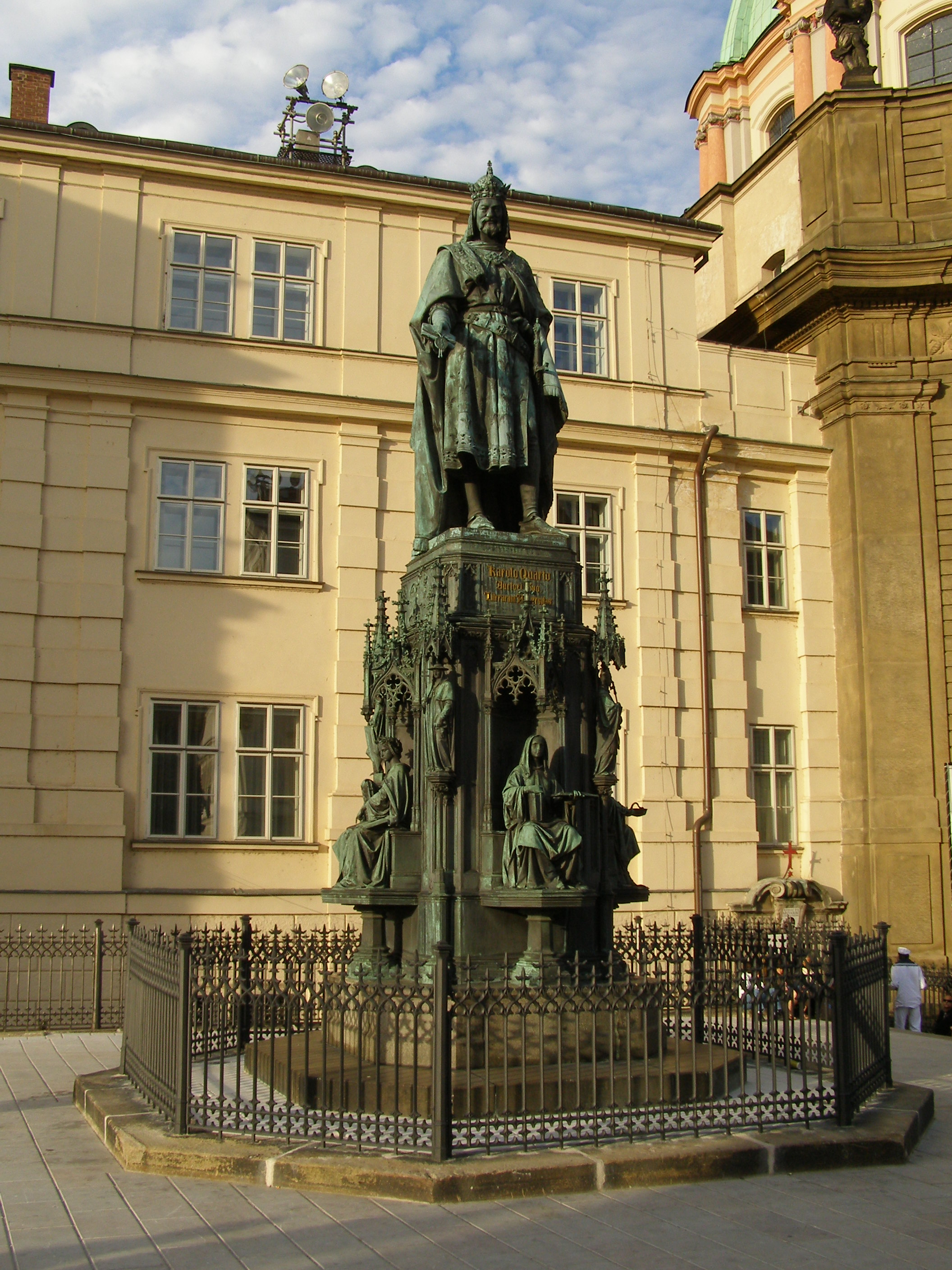
- The statue in 2012
- Type: Sculpture
- Location: Prague, Czech Republic; 50°5′10.7″N 14°24′50.05″E

The statue of Charles IV (Czech: Socha Karla IV.) is an outdoor sculpture of Charles IV, Holy Roman Emperor, located at Křižovnické Square in Prague, Czech Republic. It was designed by Ernst Hähnel in 1844 and was completed in 1849.
