= Statue of John the Baptist, Maltézské Square =

Statue in Prague, Czech Republic

Statue of John the Baptist
- Sousoší svatého Jana Křtitele (Czech)
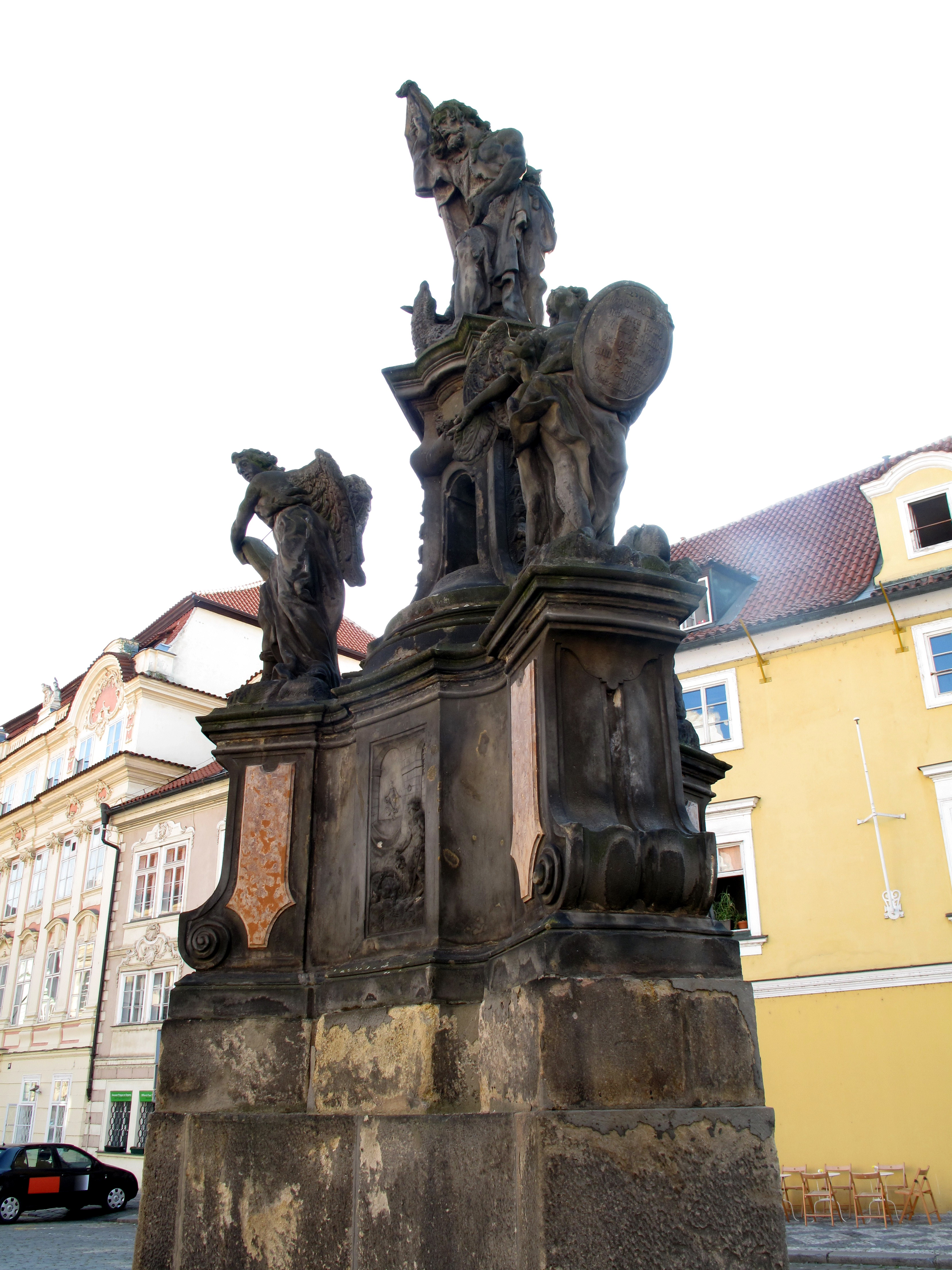
- The statue in 2011
- Type: Sculpture
- Location: Prague, Czech Republic; 50.086352°N 14.405144°E

The statue of John the Baptist (Czech: Sousoší svatého Jana Křtitele) is an outdoor sculpture by Ferdinand Maxmilián Brokoff, installed at Maltézské Square in Malá Strana, Prague, Czech Republic.
