= Statue of Saint Wenceslas (Vosmík) =

Statue in Prague, Czech Republic

- Socha svatého Václava (Czech)
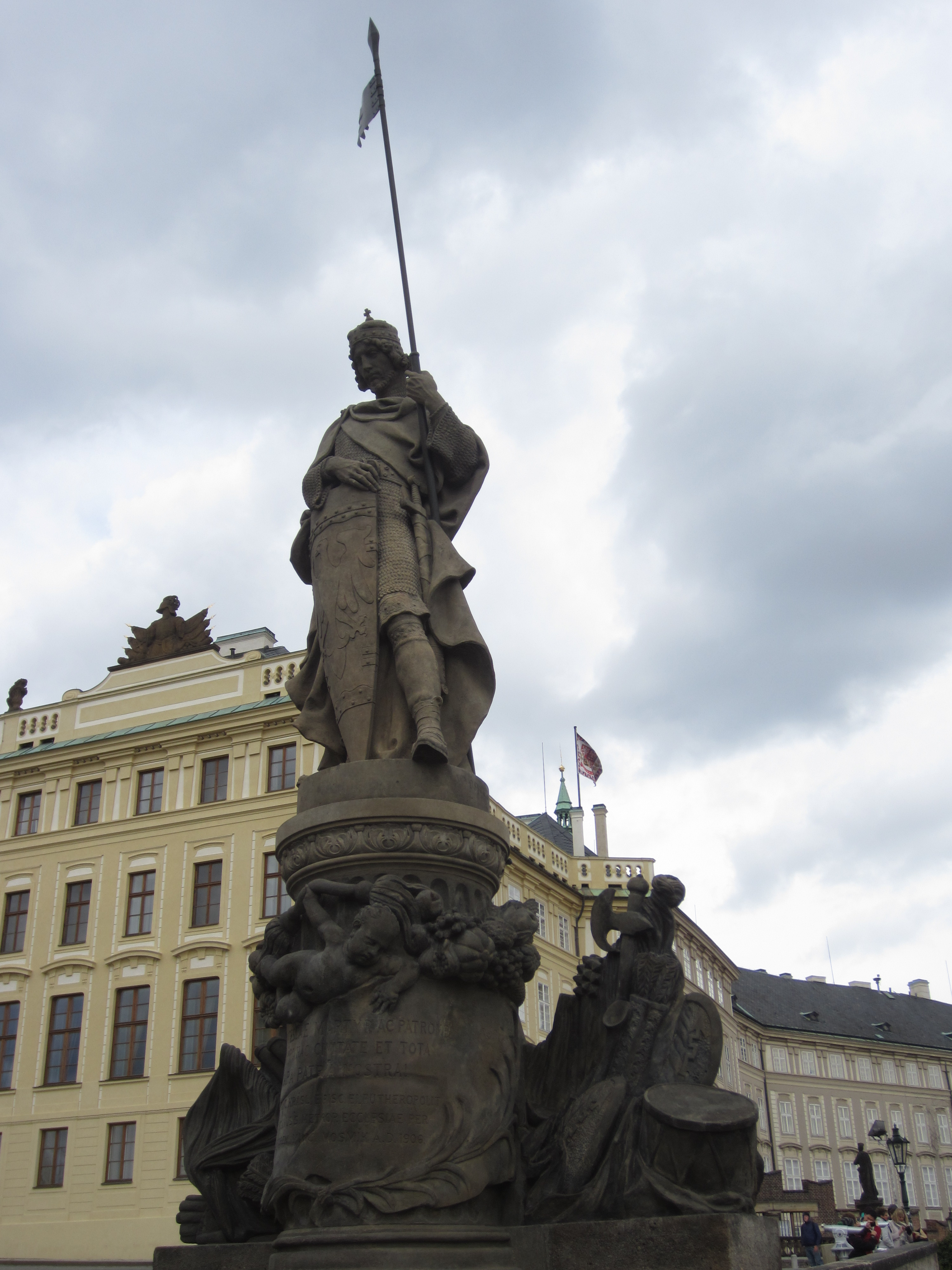
- The statue in 2016
- Type: Sculpture
- Location: Prague, Czech Republic; 50°5′20.76″N 14°23′54.07″E

A statue of Saint Wenceslas (Czech: Socha svatého Václava) by Josef Václav Myslbek is installed at Wenceslas Square near Prague Castle in Prague, Czech Republic.
