= Statue of Nicholas of Tolentino, Charles Bridge =

Statue in Prague, Czech Republic

Statue of Nicholas of Tolentino
- Socha svatého Mikuláše Tolentinského (Czech)
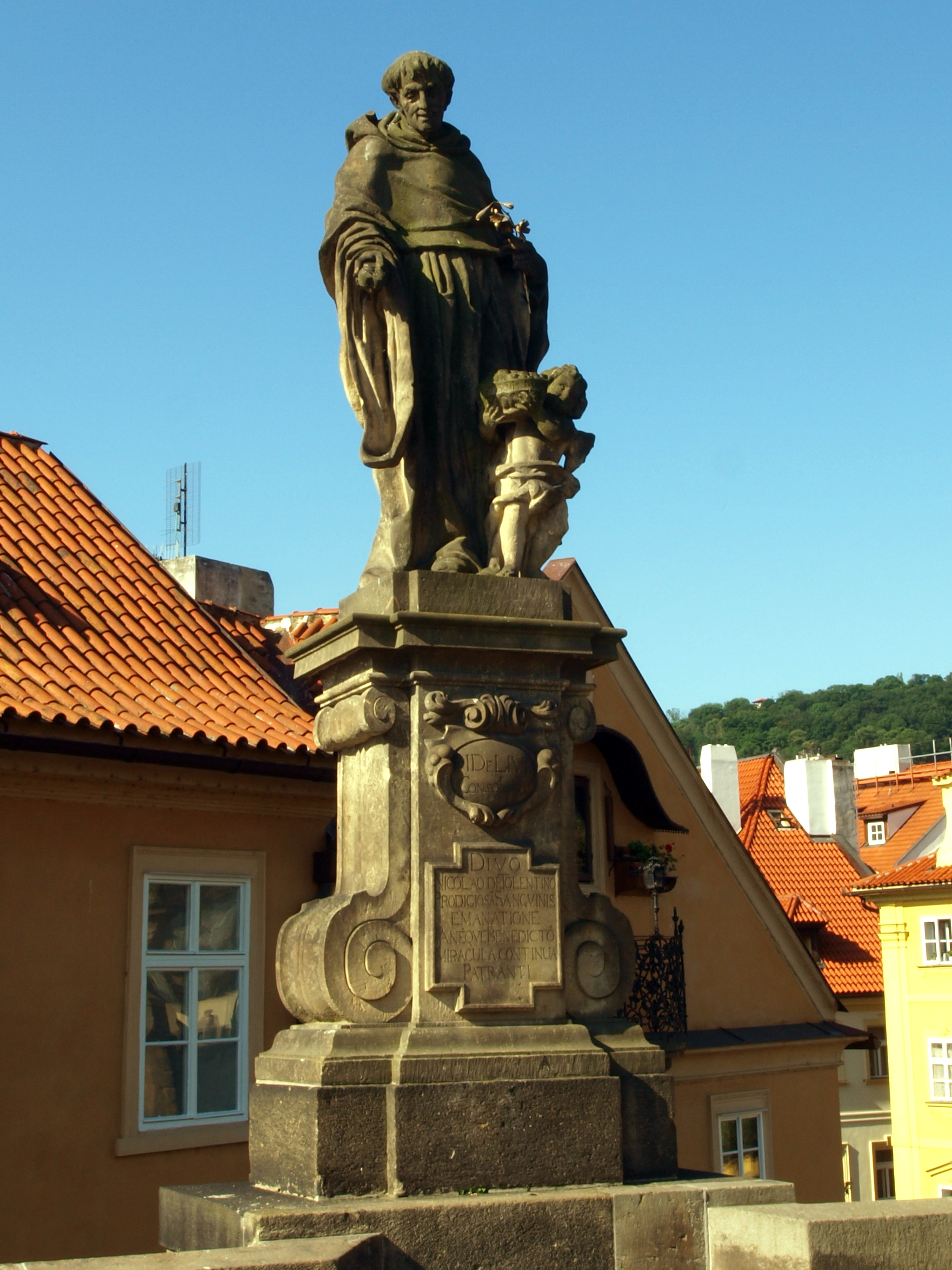
- The statue in 2012
- Artist: Jeroným Kohl
- Type: Sculpture
- Subject: Nicholas of Tolentino
- Location: Prague, Czech Republic; 50°05′12″N 14°24′32″E

The statue of Nicholas of Tolentino (Czech: Socha svatého Mikuláše Tolentinského) is an outdoor sculpture by Jeroným Kohl, installed on the south side of the Charles Bridge in Prague, Czech Republic.
