= Vítězslav Hálek Memorial =

Sculpture in Prague, Czech Republic

- Pomník Vítězslava Hálka (Czech)
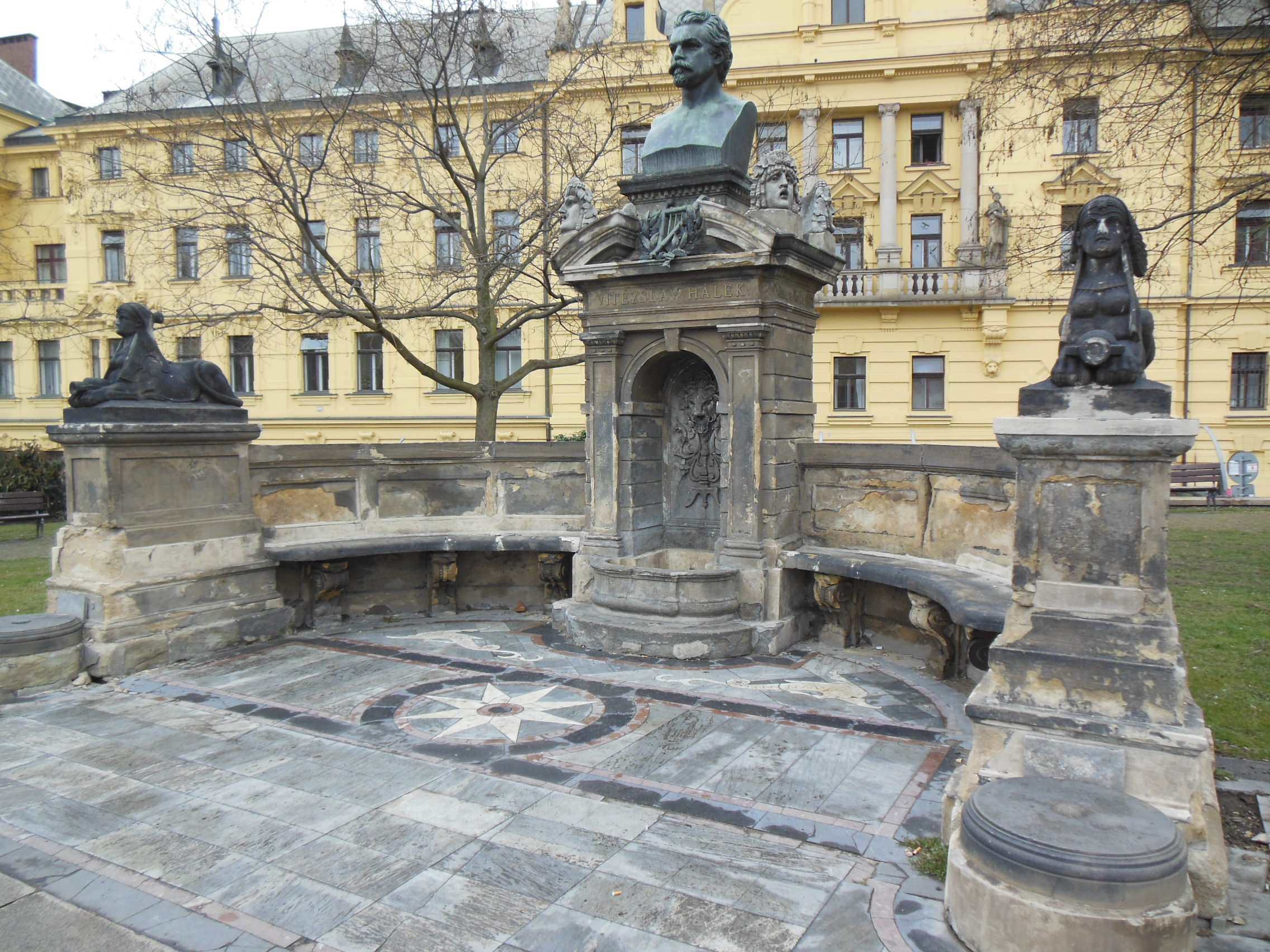
- The memorial in 2013
- Artist: Bohuslav Schnirch
- Year: 1881
- Location: Prague, Czech Republic; 50°4′40.08″N 14°25′13.44″E

The Vítězslav Hálek Memorial (Czech: Pomník Vítězslava Hálka) is an outdoor monument to Vítězslav Hálek, located at the Charles Square in Prague, Czech Republic.
