= Wimmer's Fountain =

Fountain and sculpture in Prague, Czech Republic

- Wimmerova kašna (Czech)
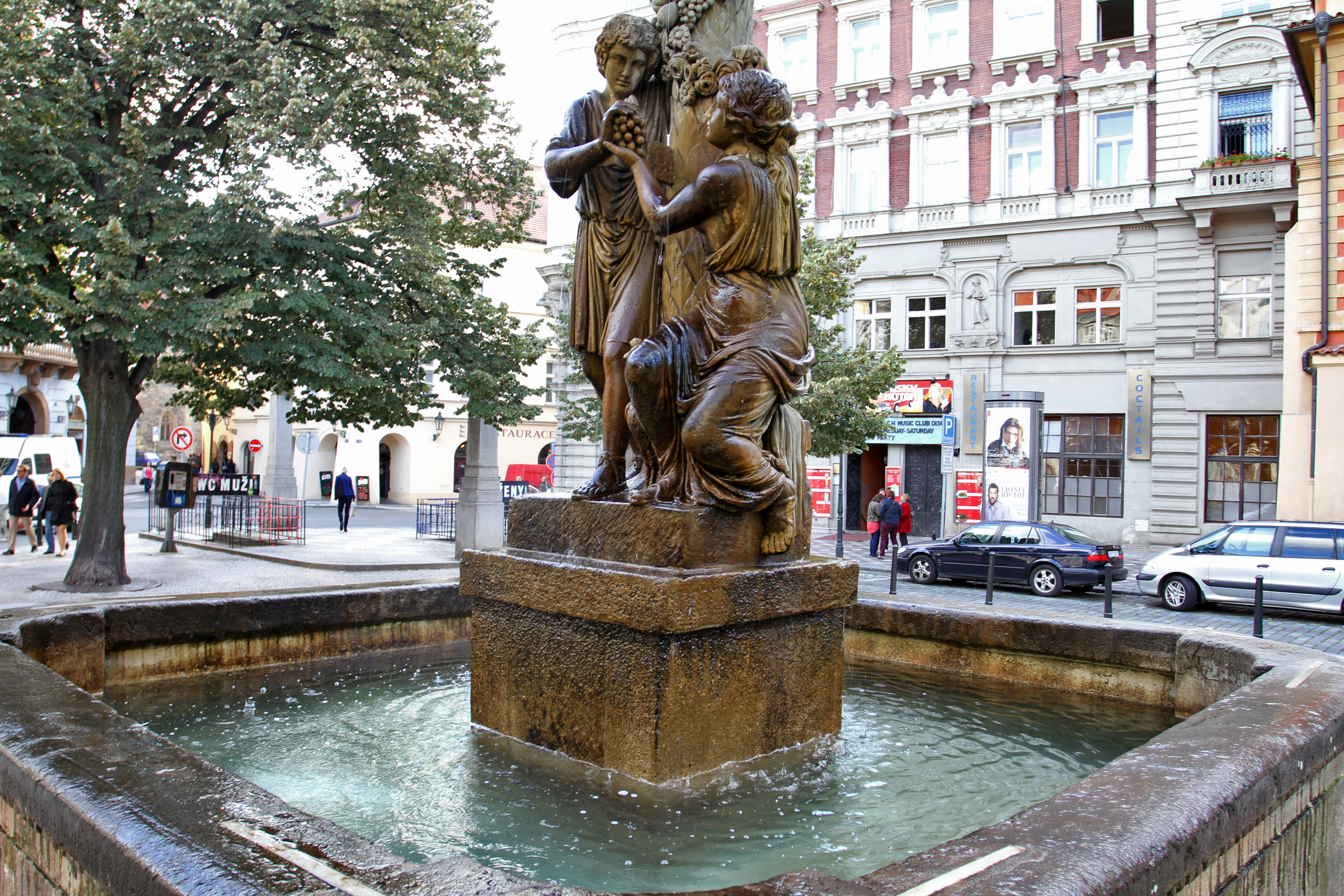
- The fountain in 2012
- Location: Prague, Czech Republic; 50°5′2.18″N 14°25′13.49″E

Wimmer's Fountain (Czech: Wimmerova kašna), or Wimmer Fountain, is an outdoor fountain and sculpture in Old Town, Prague, Czech Republic.
