= Statues of Saints Cosmas and Damian, Charles Bridge =

Statues in Prague, Czech Republic

Coordinates: 50°05′14″N 14°24′27″E

Statues of Saints Cosmas and Damian
- Sousoší svatého Salvátora, Kosmy a Damiána (Czech)
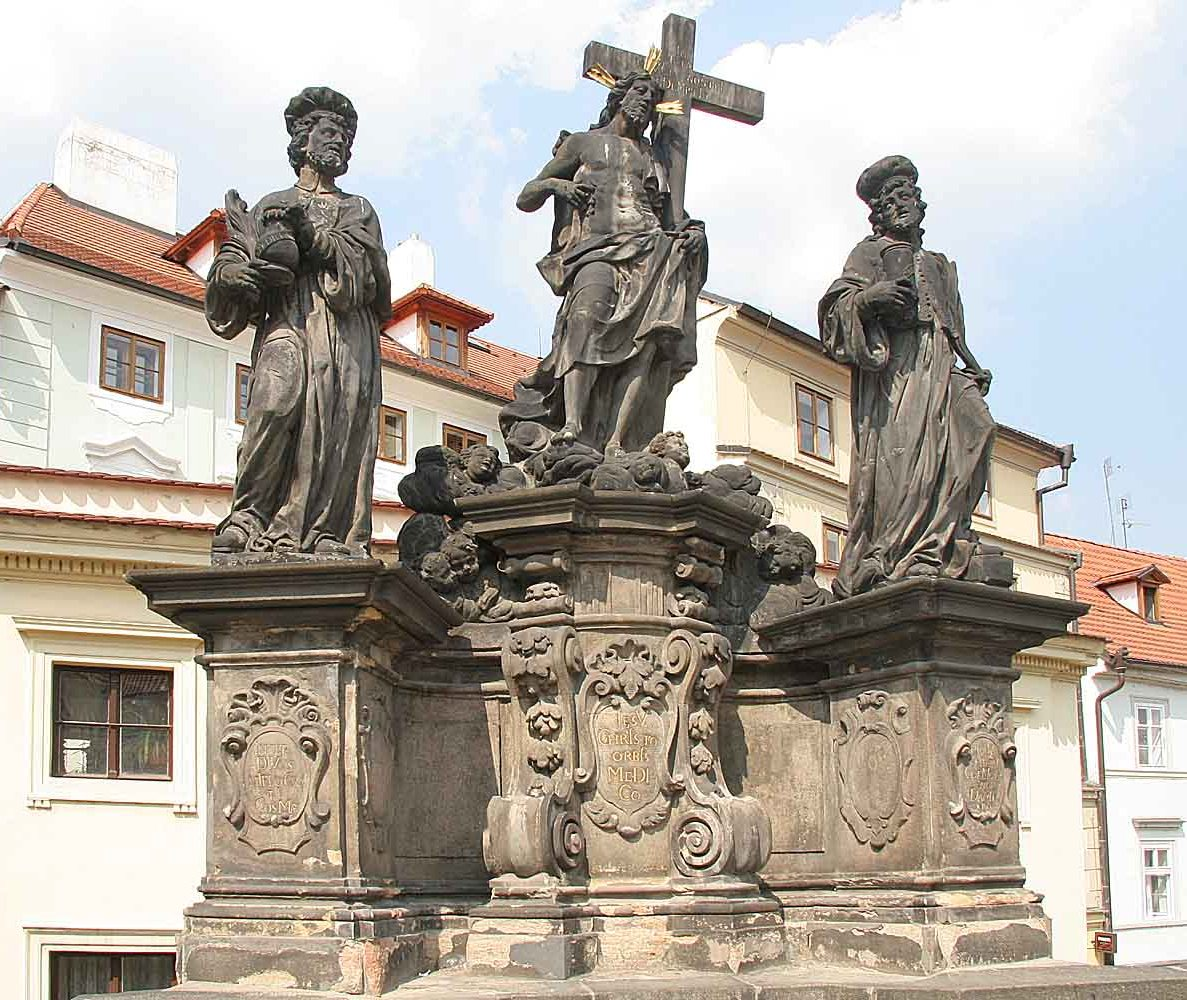
- The statues, 2006
- Artist: Jan Oldřich Mayer
- Location: Prague, Czech Republic

Statues of Saints Cosmas and Damian (Czech: Sousoší svatého Salvátora, Kosmy a Damiána) by Jan Oldřich Mayer are installed on the north side of the Charles Bridge in Prague, Czech Republic.
