= Statues of Madonna, Saint Dominic and Thomas Aquinas, Charles Bridge =

Statues in Prague, Czech Republic

Statues of Madonna, Saint Dominic and Thomas Aquinas
- Sousoší Madony, svatého Dominika a Tomáše Akvinského (Czech)
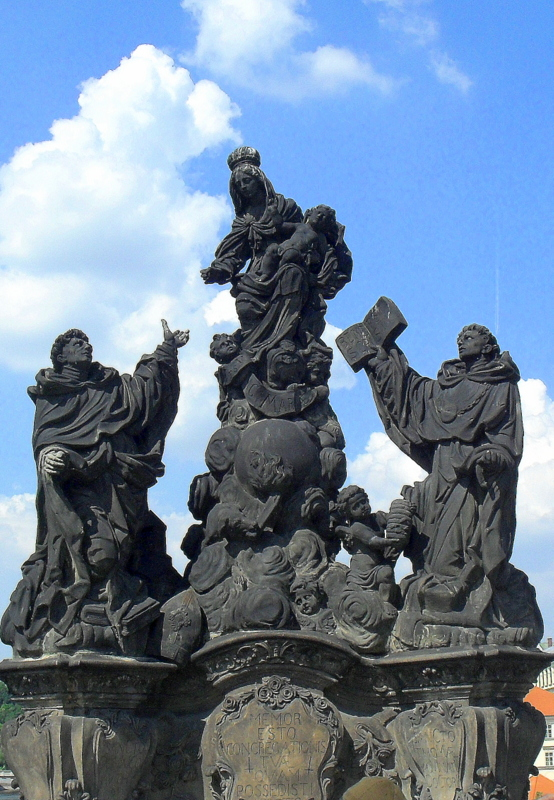
- The statues in 2011
- Location: Prague, Czech Republic; 50°5′10.89″N 14°24′45.78″E

The statues of Madonna, Saint Dominic and Thomas Aquinas (Czech: Sousoší Madony, svatého Dominika a Tomáše Akvinského) are outdoor sculptures by Matěj Václav Jäckel, installed on the north side of the Charles Bridge in Prague, Czech Republic. Later, these statues were moved to the Lapidarium of the National Museum of the Czech Republic.
