= Statue of Wenceslaus I, Charles Bridge =

Statue in Prague, Czech Republic

Coordinates: 50°05′13″N 14°24′27″E

Statue of Wenceslaus I
- Socha svatého Václava (Czech)
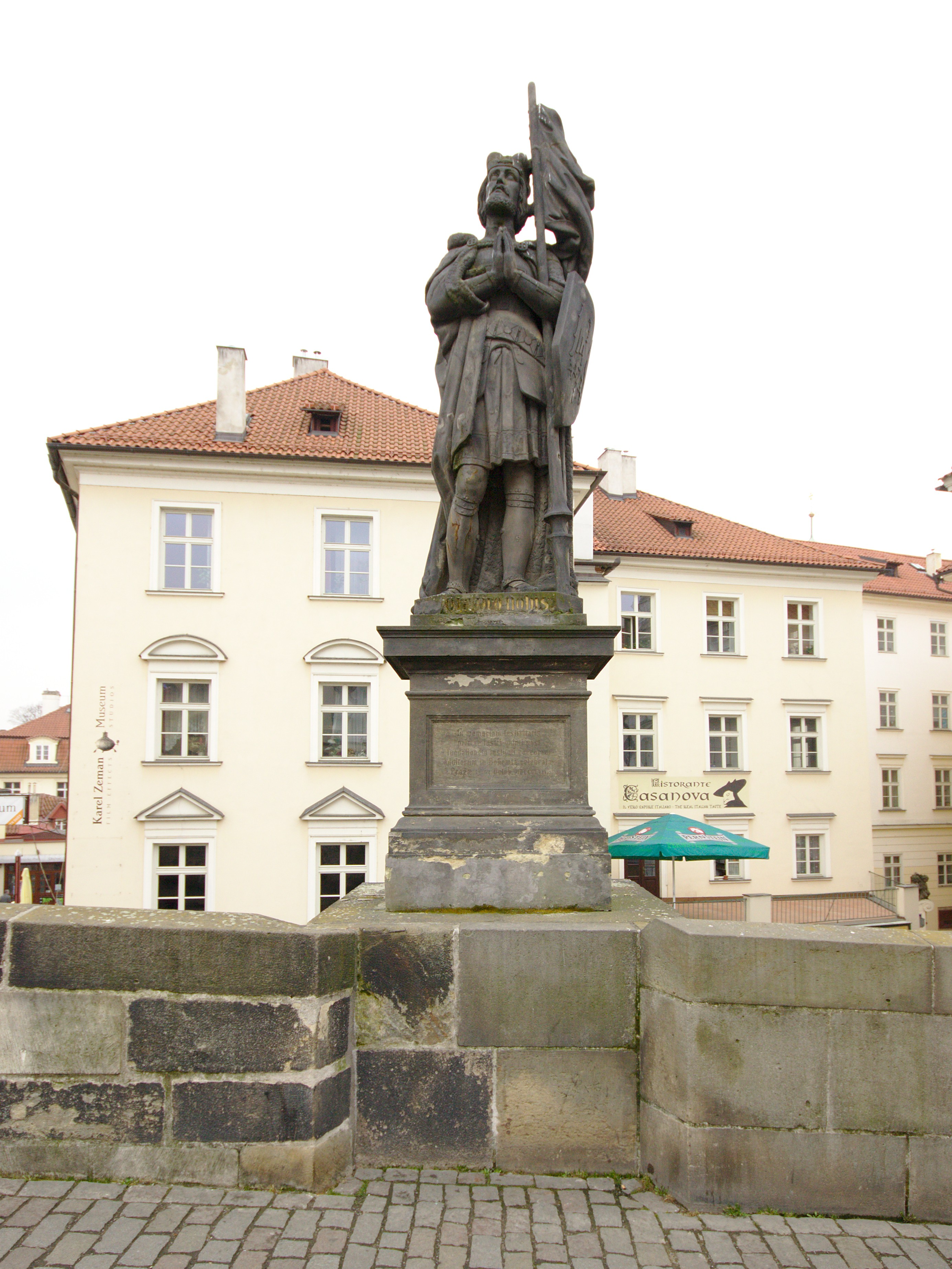
- The statue in 2014
- Artist: Josef Kamil Böhm
- Subject: Wenceslaus I, Duke of Bohemia
- Location: Prague, Czech Republic

The statue of Wenceslaus I (Czech: Socha svatého Václava) is an outdoor sculpture by Josef Kamil Böhm, installed on the south side of the Charles Bridge in Prague, Czech Republic.
