= Statue of Saint Anne, Charles Bridge =

Statue in Prague, Czech Republic

Statue of Saint Anne
- Socha svaté Anny (Czech)
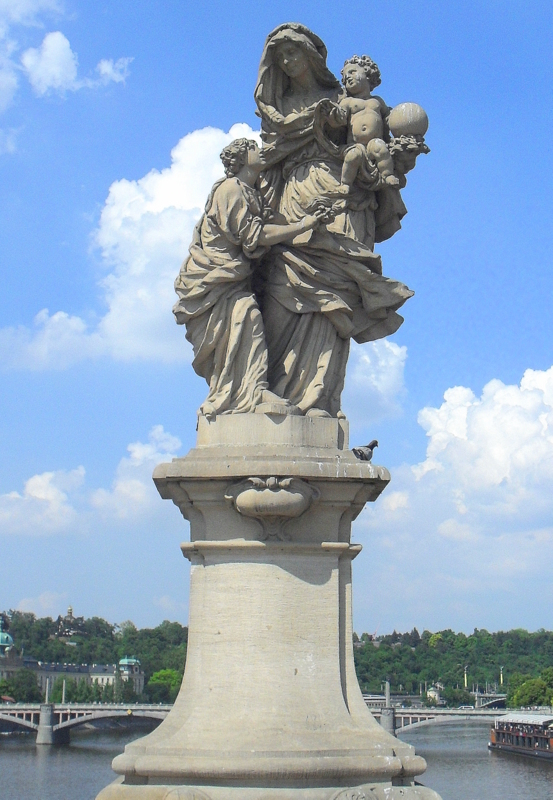
- The statue in 2011
- Location: Prague, Czech Republic; 50°5′11.28″N 14°24′42.97″E

The statue of Saint Anne (Czech: Socha svaté Anny) is an outdoor sculpture which was developed by Matěj Václav Jäckel in 1707. It was installed on the north side of the Charles Bridge in Prague, Czech Republic.
