= Statue of Saint Procopius (Vyšehrad) =

Statue in Prague, Czech Republic

- Socha svatého Prokopa (Czech)
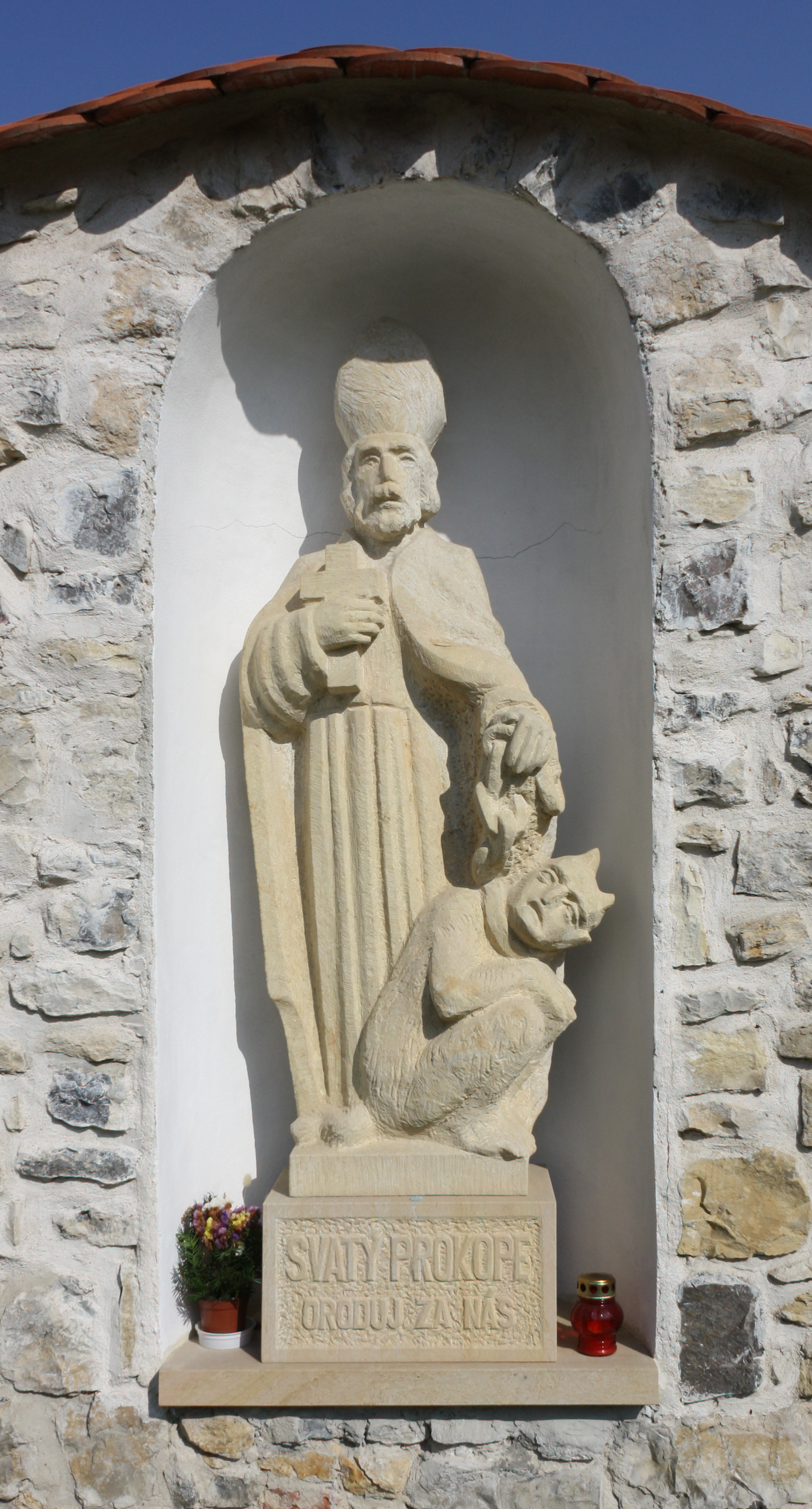
- The sculpture in 2012
- Type: Sculpture
- Location: Prague, Czech Republic; 50.064017°N 14.420919°E

The Statue of Saint Procopius (Czech: Socha svatého Prokopa) is installed in a niche of the wall of the homestead K rotundě 16/3 (former canon's court) at Vyšehrad, Prague, Czech Republic.

The statue has a modern appearance; its sculptor and the year of its origin are not declared at the statue. The statue is mentioned in the description of the Vyšehrad Fortress in the state register of cultural monuments among elements which are possible candidates to be included into protection. However, no further details are stated.
