= Youth (Zet) =

Sculpture in Prague, Czech Republic

- Mládí (Czech), Joyful youth
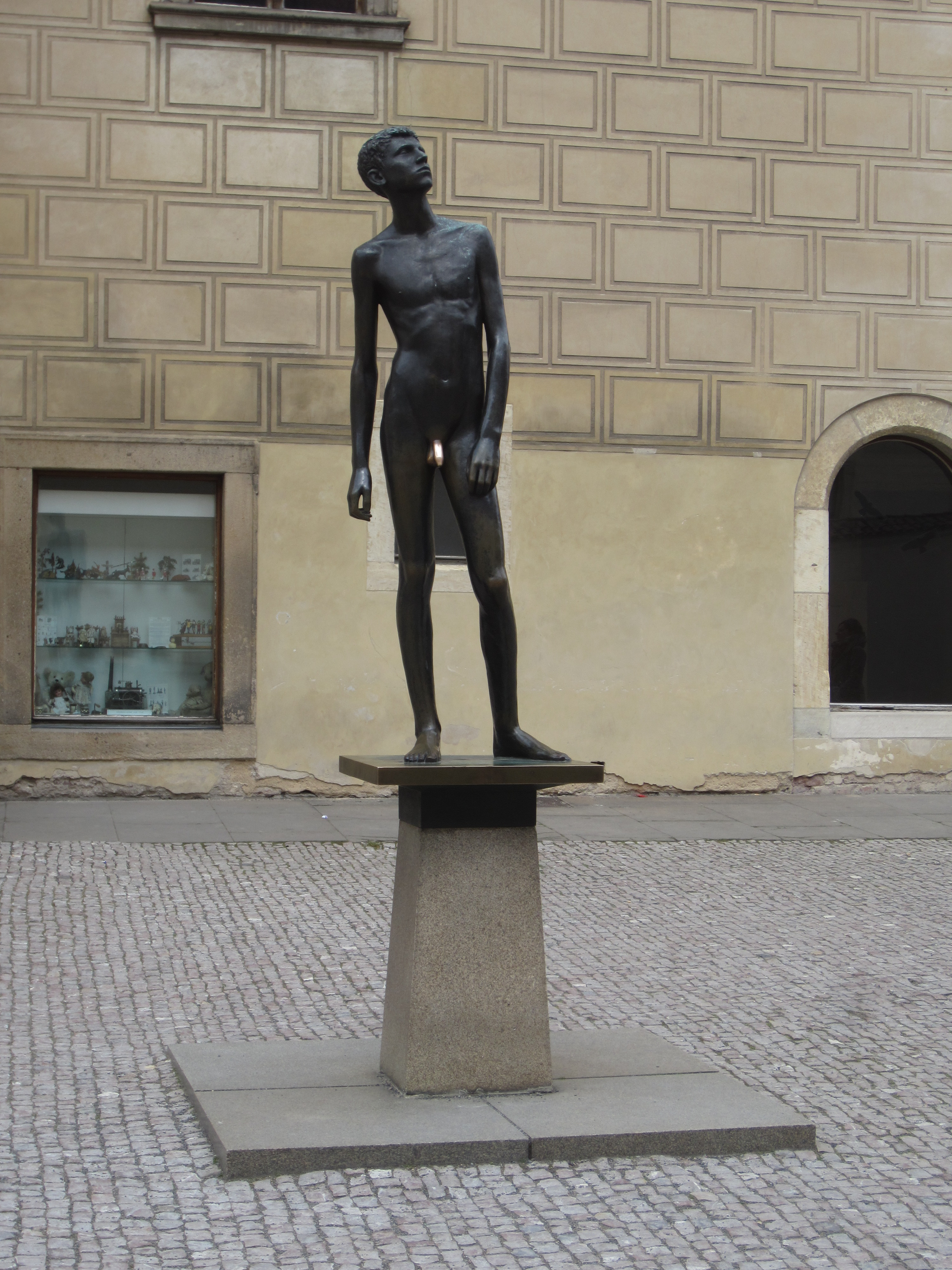
- The statue in 2016
- Artist: Miloš Zet
- Type: Sculpture
- Medium: bronze
- Location: Gallery of the City Prague (since 2016); Prague, Czech Republic; 50.0918°N 14.4051°E

Youth (Czech: Mládí), or Joyful Youth (Radostné mládí), is an outdoor bronze sculpture of a nude young man by Miloš Zet, installed in 1965 outside the House of children (after 1989 changed to the Toy Museum) at Prague Castle in Prague, Czech Republic.

Before the last adaptation of the courtyard, in 2016 the statue was removed and has been stored in the depository of the Gallery of the City of Prague.
