= Statue of Saint Sebastian (Vyšehrad) =

Statue in Prague, Czech Republic

- Socha svatého Šebestiána (Czech)
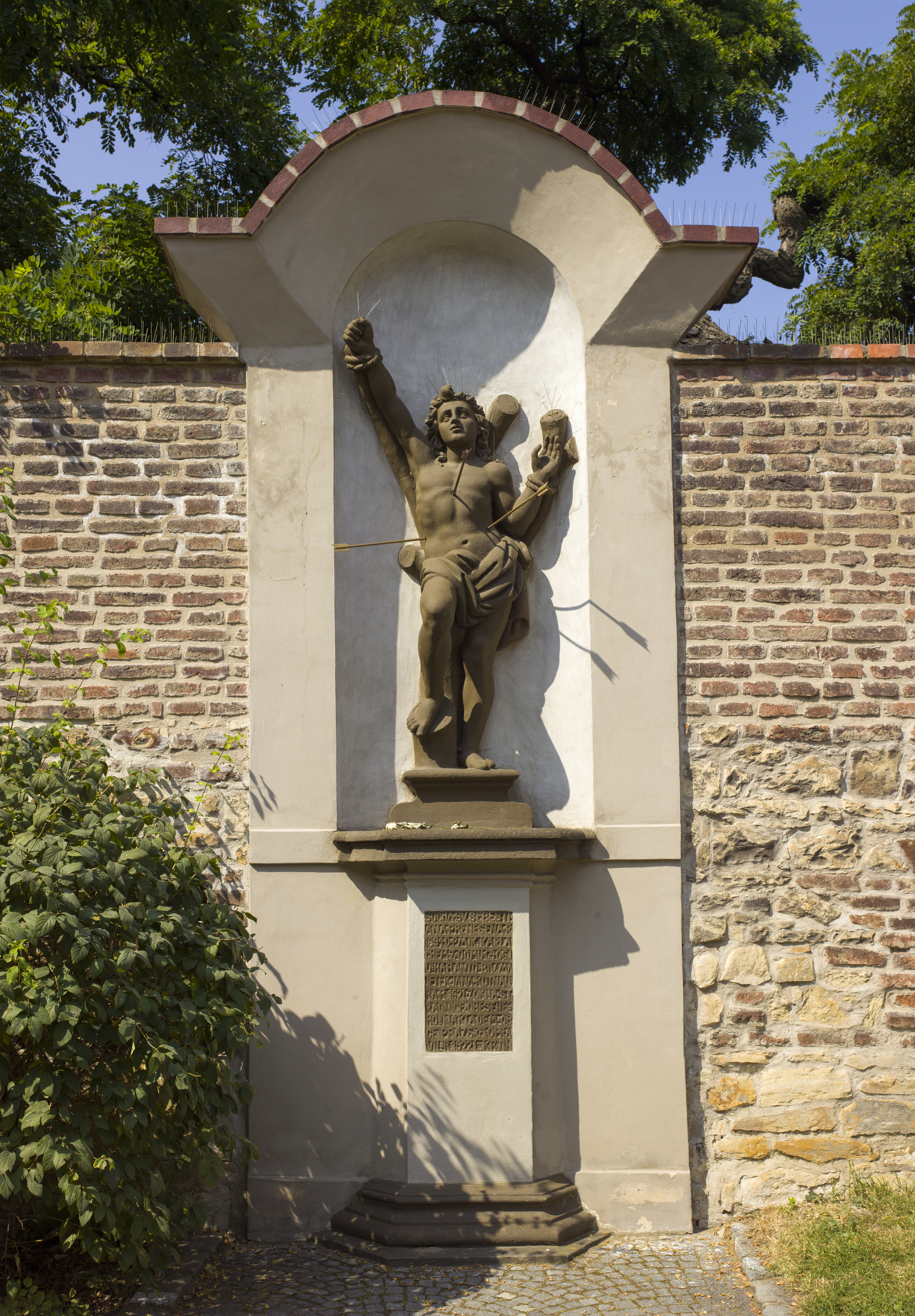
- The sculpture in 2013
- Type: Sculpture
- Location: Prague, Czech Republic; 50.0645°N 14.416933°E

The statue of Saint Sebastian (Czech: Socha svatého Šebestiána) is installed at Vyšehrad, Prague, Czech Republic.
