= Statue of Taras Shevchenko, Smíchov =

Statue in Prague, Czech Republic

Statue of Taras Shevchenko
- Socha Tarase Ševčenka (Czech)
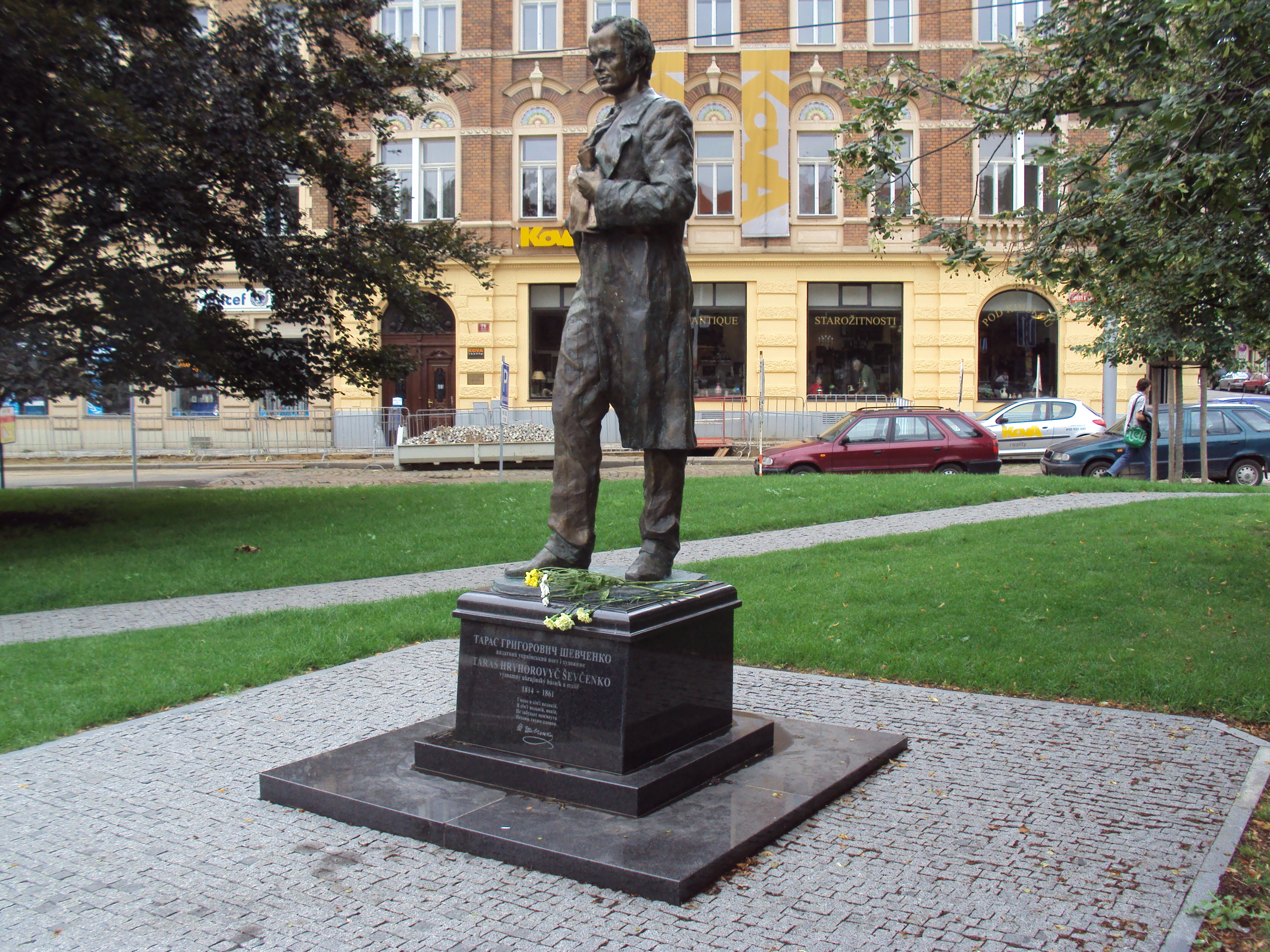
- The statue in 2010
- Type: Sculpture
- Location: Prague, Czech Republic; 50°4′42.4″N 14°24′16.08″E

The statue of Taras Shevchenko (Czech: Socha Tarase Ševčenka) is an outdoor sculpture by Valentyn Znoba, installed in Smíchov, Prague, in the Czech Republic. The monument depicts a younger Shevchenko.

It was commissioned by the Ukrainian community in the Czech Republic, and funded by two Czech businessman and the Ukrainian ministry of Foreign Affairs for approximately 2 million Czech crowns. The statue was originally intended to be built in another part of Prague, Bubeneč, but it was opposed by locals after construction began before the building permit was issued and because they questioned Shevchenko's connection to the neighbourhood. The status was formally unveilved on 25 March 2009 during a visit by then Ukrainian President Viktor Yushchenko when he visited the Czech Republic.

== See also ==
- Legacy of Taras Shevchenko
