= Polibek (Petřín) =

Sculpture in Prague, Czech Republic

- Kiss (English)
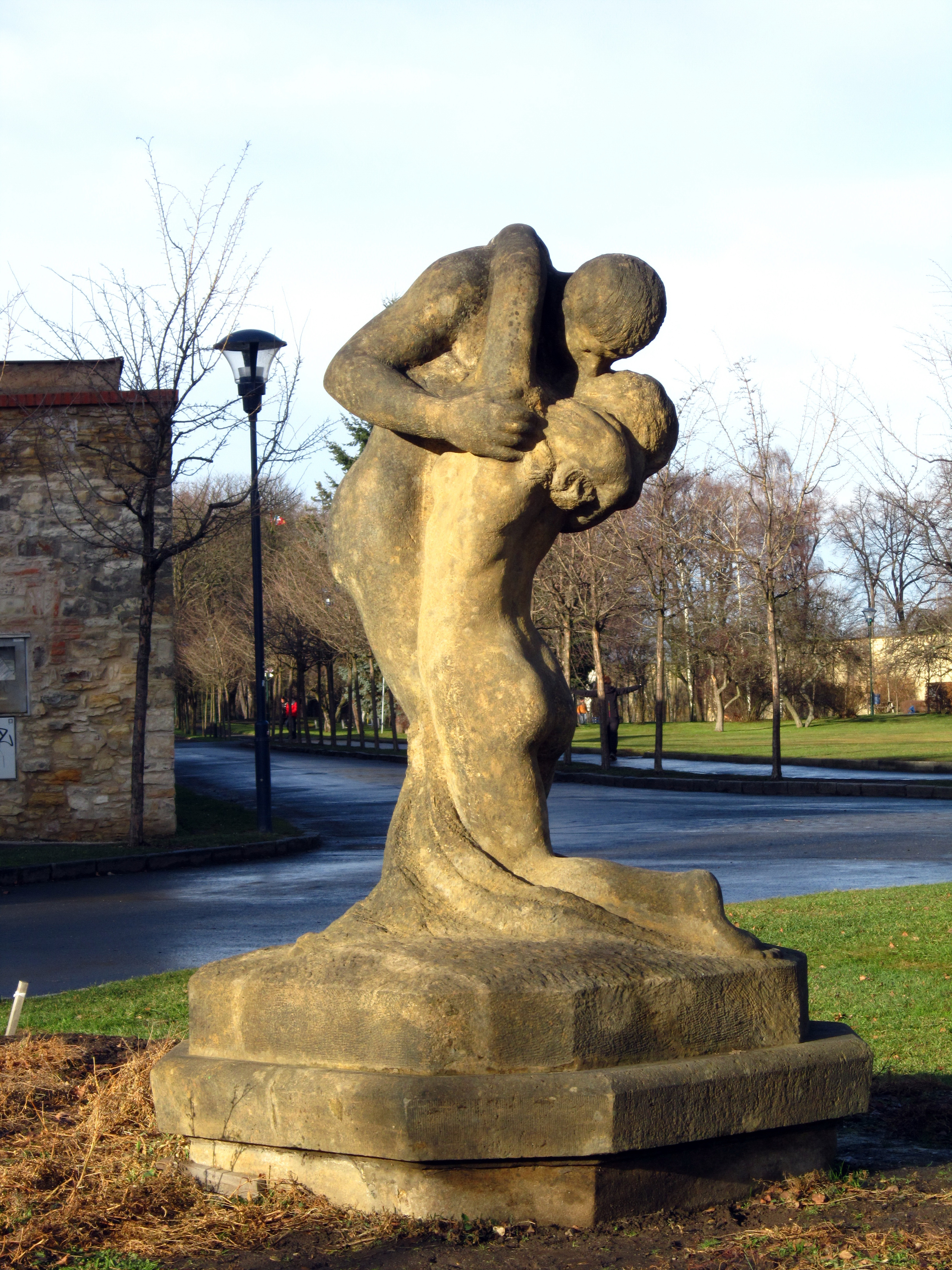
- The statue in 2012

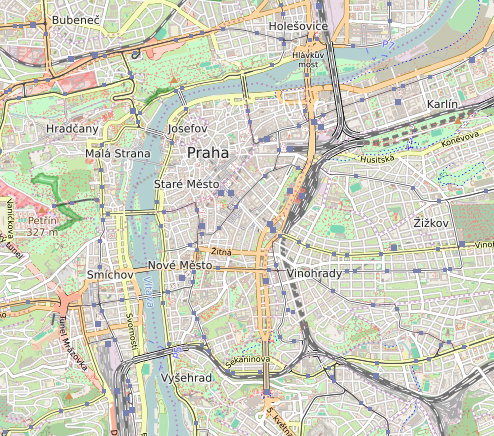
- Location in Prague
- Location: Prague, Czech Republic; 50°04′55″N 14°23′47″E

Polibek (English: Kiss) is a protected sandstone statue by Czech sculptor Josef Mařatka (1874–1937), installed on the hill of Petřín (Hradčany) in Prague, Czech Republic.
