= Kohl's Fountain =

Fountain and sculpture in Prague, Czech Republic

- Kohlova kašna (Czech)
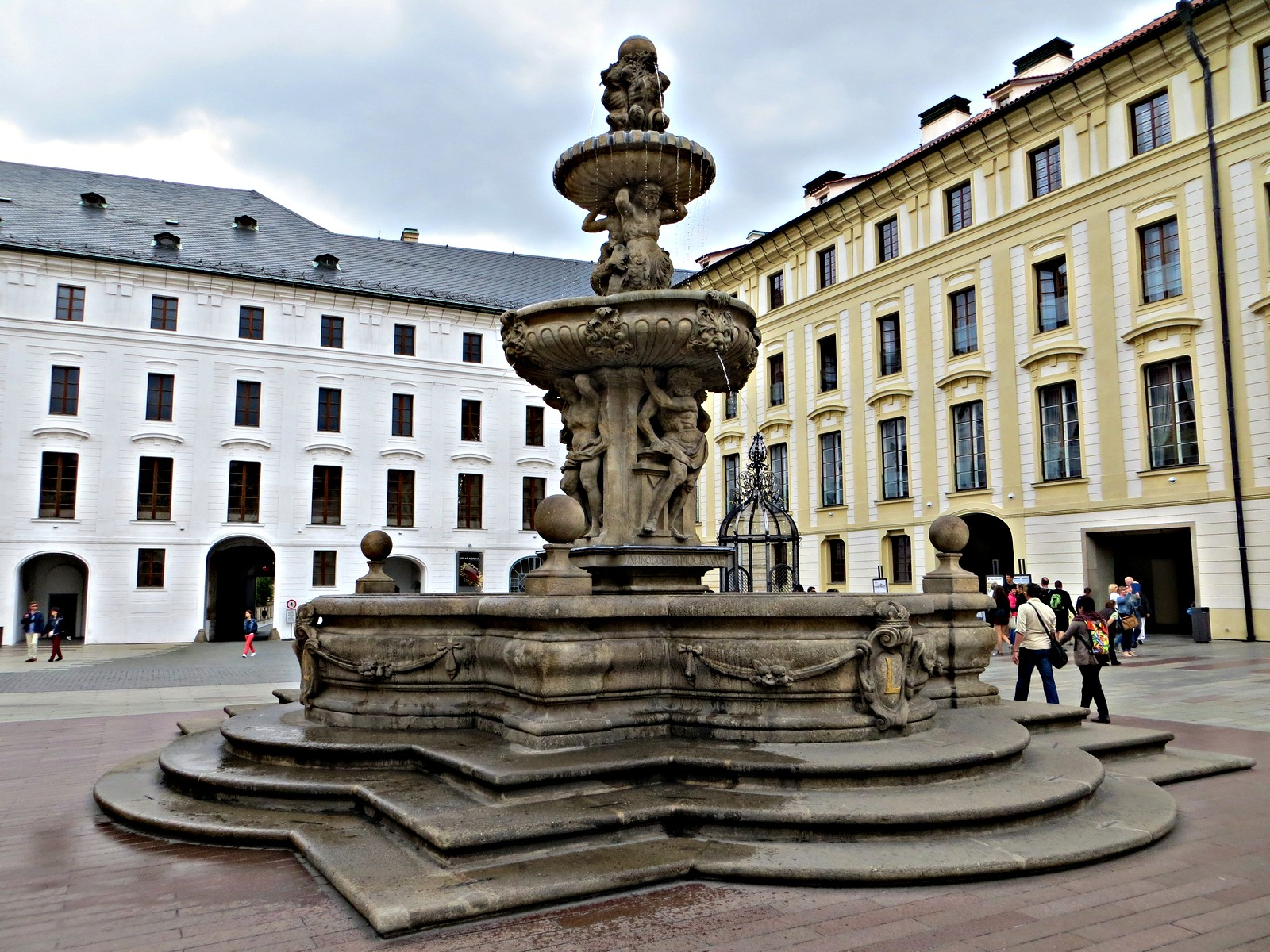
- The fountain in 2015
- Location: Prague, Czech Republic; 50.0904°N 14.3990°E

Kohl's Fountain (Czech: Kohlova kašna) is a fountain installed in the second courtyard of Prague Castle in Prague, Czech Republic. The fountain is embellished with lions' heads and Roman gods.
