= Statues of Madonna and Saint Bernard, Charles Bridge =

Statues in Prague, Czech Republic

Statues of Madonna and Saint Bernard
- Sousoší Madony a svatého Bernarda (Czech)
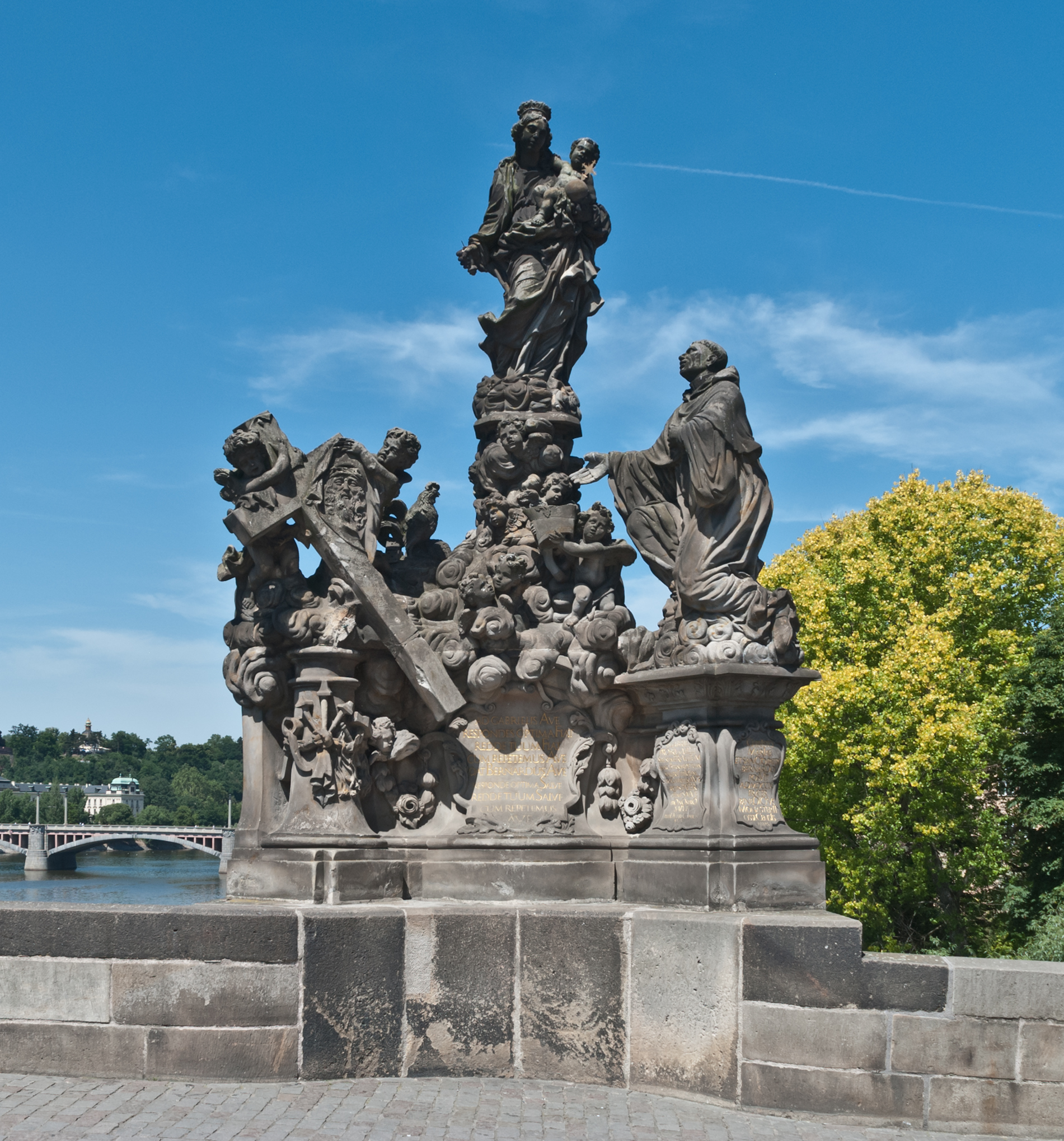
- The statues in 2014
- Location: Prague, Czech Republic; 50°5′10.66″N 14°24′47.31″E

Statues of Madonna and Saint Bernard (Czech: Sousoší Madony a svatého Bernarda) by Matěj Václav Jäckel are installed on the north side of the Charles Bridge in Prague, Czech Republic.
