= Statue of Anthony of Padua, Charles Bridge =

Statue in Prague, Czech Republic

Statue of Anthony of Padua
- Socha svatého Antonína Paduánského (Czech)
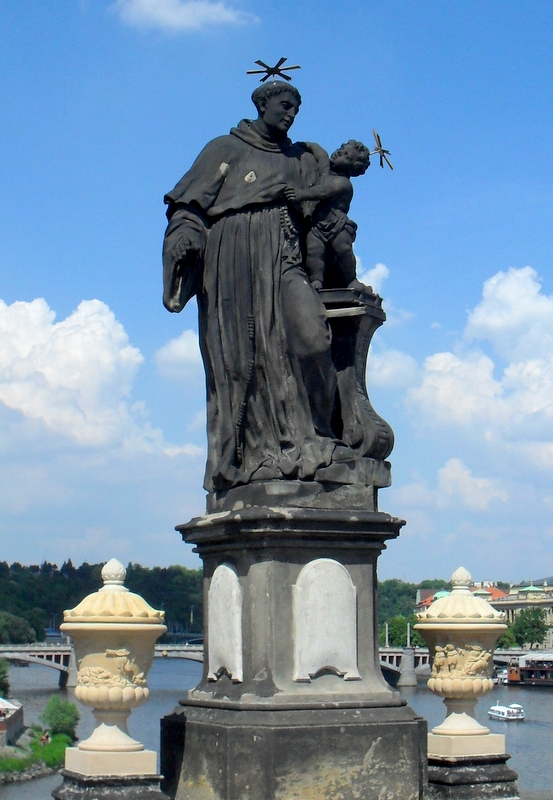
- The statue in 2011
- Type: Sculpture
- Subject: Anthony of Padua
- Location: Prague, Czech Republic; 50°05′12″N 14°24′35″E

The statue of Anthony of Padua (Czech: Socha svatého Antonína Paduánského) is an outdoor sculpture by Jan Oldřich Mayer, installed on the north side of the Charles Bridge in Prague, Czech Republic.
