= Znovuzrození =

Sculpture in Prague, Czech Republic

- Rebirth (English)
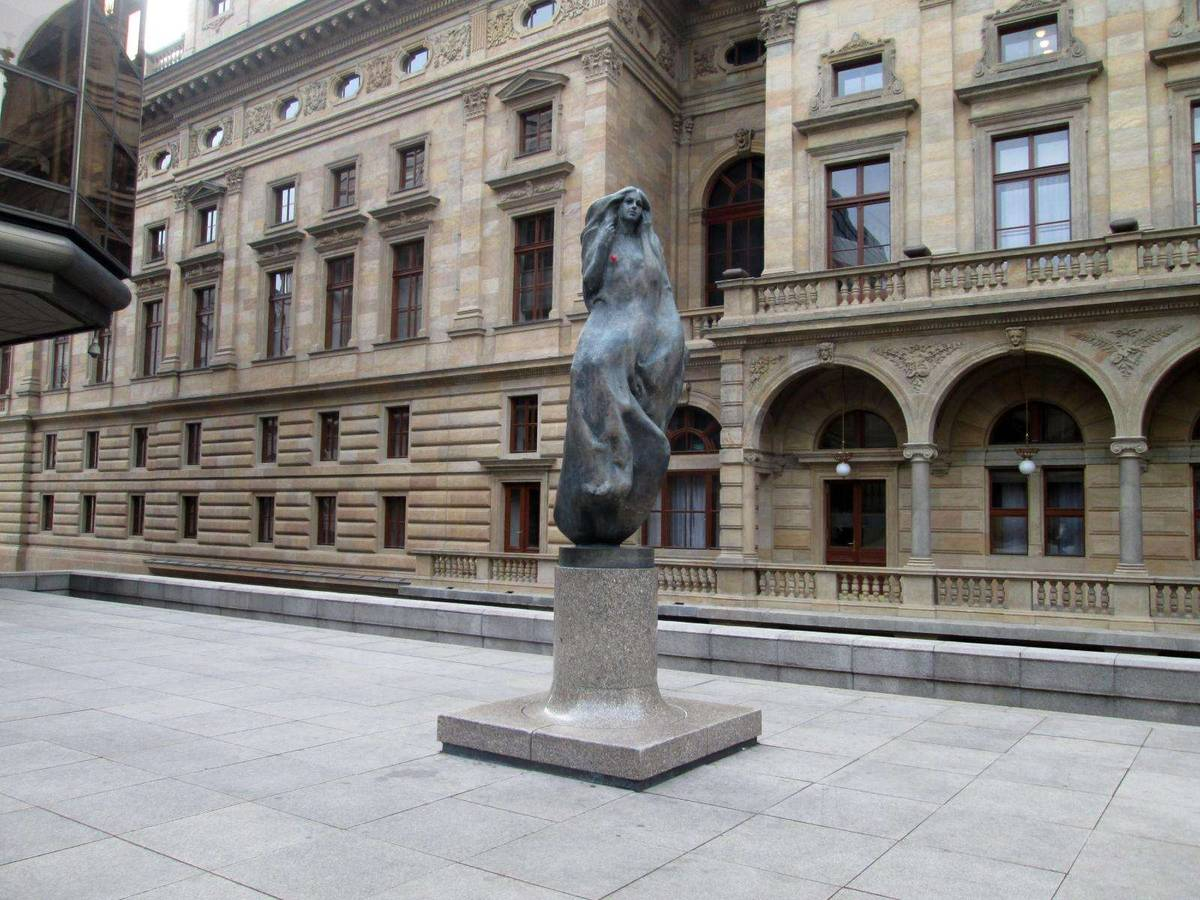
- "Rebirth" by Josef Malejovský
- Artist: Josef Malejovský
- Type: Sculpture
- Medium: bronze
- Location: Prague, Czech Republic; 50°4′51.29″N 14°24′50.71″E

Znovuzrození (English: Rebirth) is a 1983 bronze sculpture by Josef Malejovský (1914–2003). It is installed outside the National Theatre in Prague, Czech Republic, on a piazzetta which was named "Náměstí Václava Havla" in 2016 to honor the first Czech president. The statue is a popular subject to artistic interventions - it has been wrapped in bubblegum-like cover, dressed in Carmen costume or into a lookalike of the famous Woman In Gold painting by Gustav Klimt.

== Gallery ==
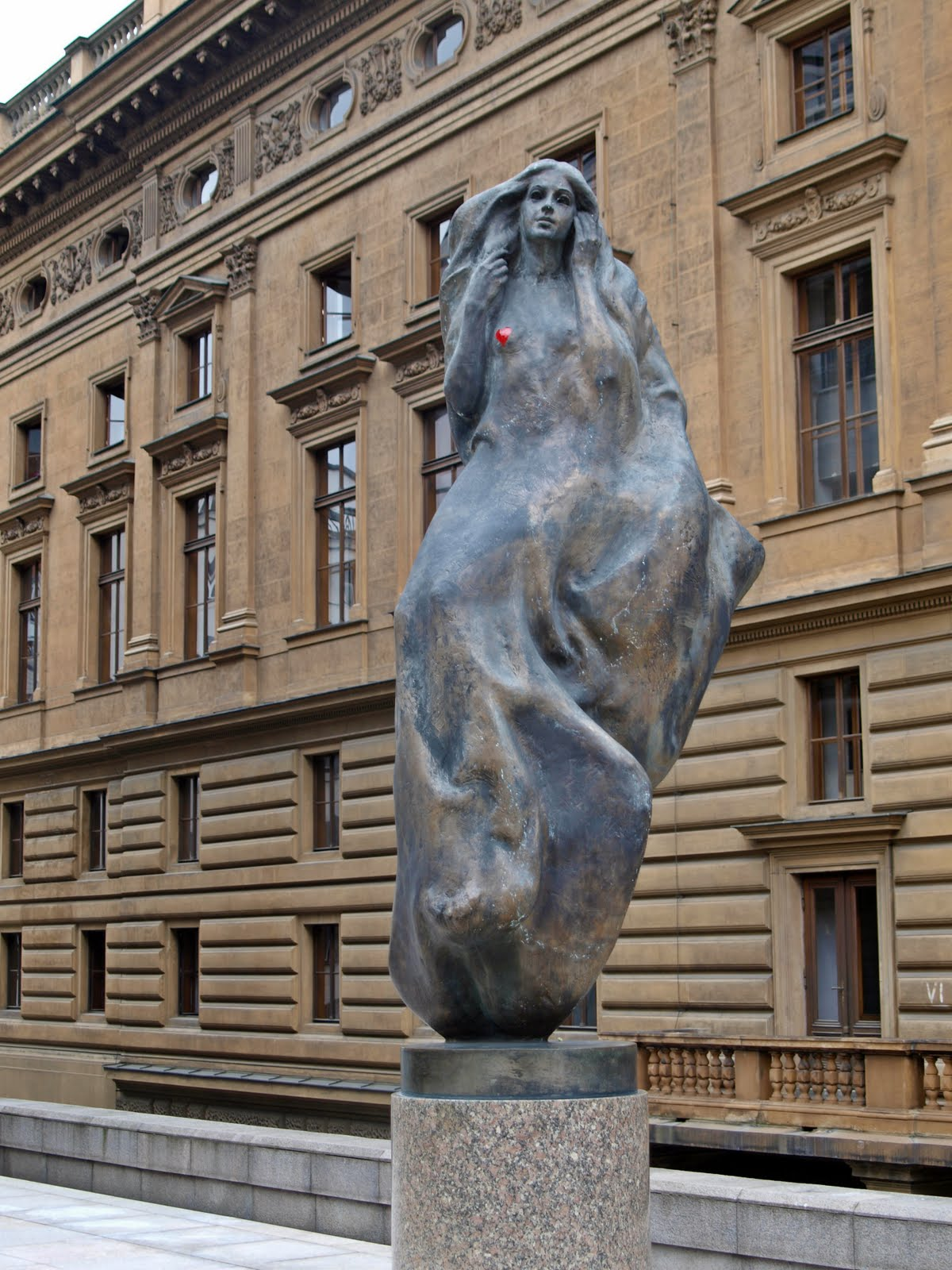
Original statue

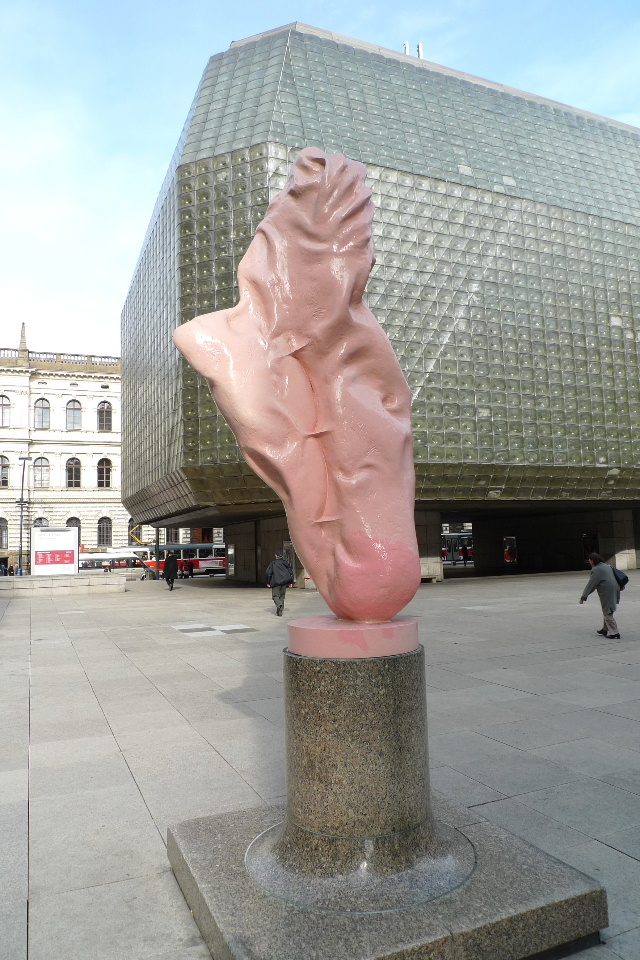
Bubble gum version

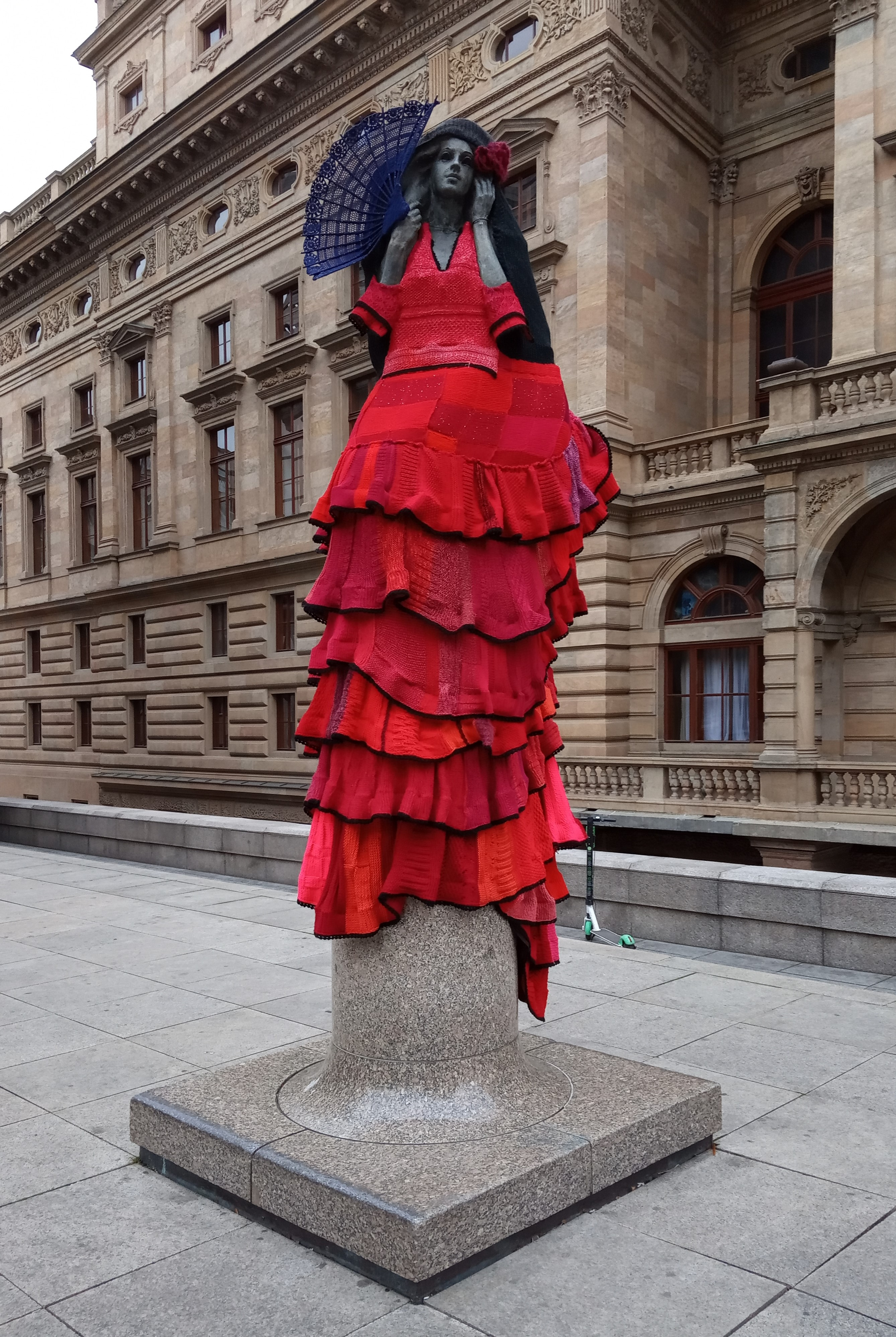
Carmen version

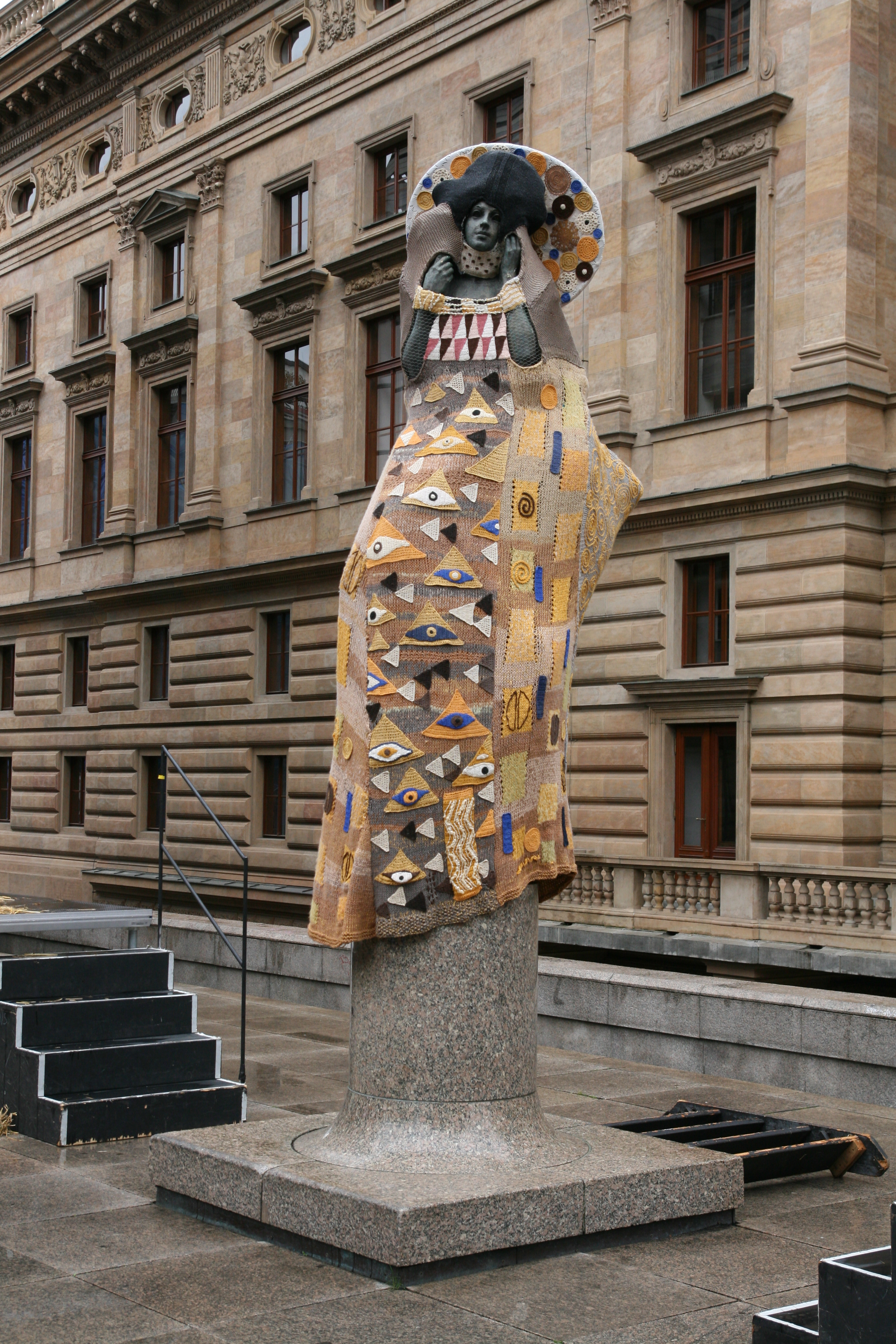
Adele Bloch-Bauer version
