= Trigae =

Sculptures on the roof of the National Theatre in Prague, Czech Republic

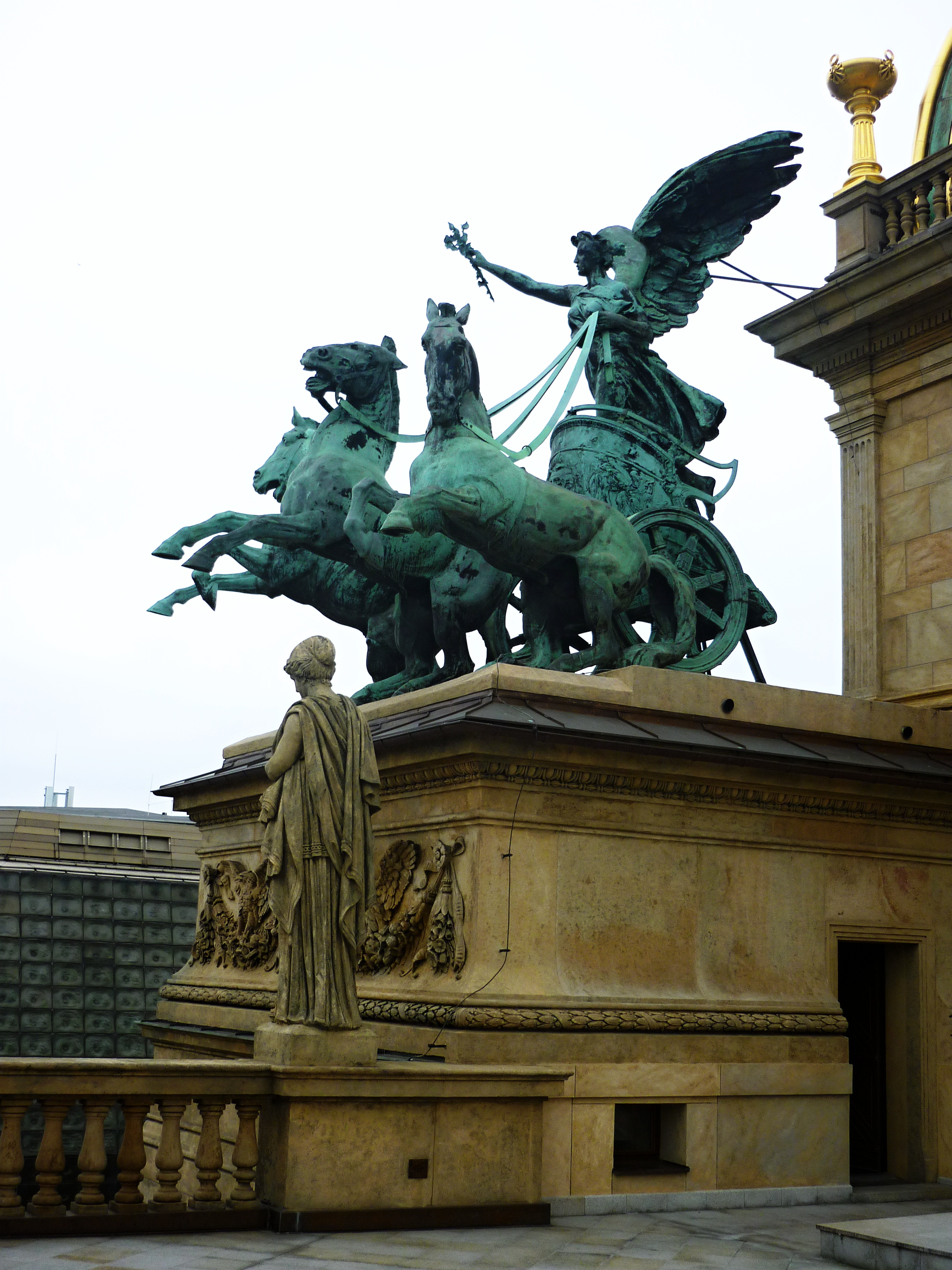
- One triga sculpture on the National Theatre's roof, 2014
- Location: Prague, Czech Republic
- 50°4′52.48″N 14°24′47.37″E

There are two triga sculptures installed on the roof corners of the National Theatre in Prague, Czech Republic. The horses are controlled by the winged goddess Victoria. The sculptures were proposed and modeled by Czech sculptor Bohuslav Schnirch (1845–1901) and created by Ladislav Šaloun (1870–1946). The works were installed in 1911. Šaloun's wife, Julia, served as the model for Victoria. The statues were renovated several times, most recently in 2008.
