= Statue of Augustine of Hippo, Charles Bridge =

Statue in Prague, Czech Republic

Statue of Augustine of Hippo
- Socha svatého Augustina (Czech)
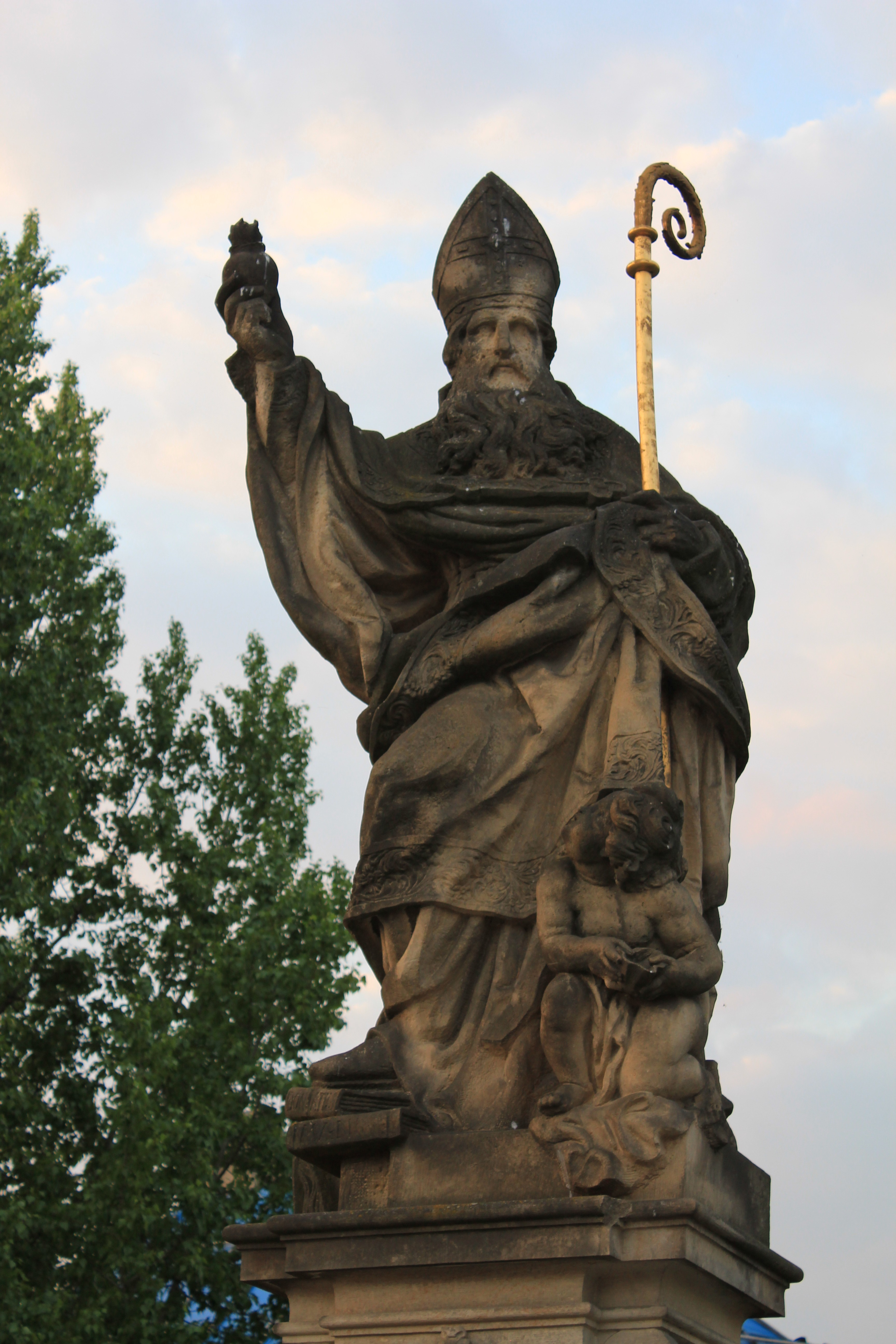
- The statue in 2014
- Artist: Jeroným Kohl
- Type: Sculpture
- Subject: Augustine of Hippo
- Location: Prague, Czech Republic; 50°05′13″N 14°24′32″E

The statue of Augustine of Hippo, or the statue of Saint Augustinus (Czech: Socha svatého Augustina), is an outdoor sculpture by Jeroným Kohl, installed on the north side of the Charles Bridge in Prague, Czech Republic.
