= HaMerotz LaMillion 2 =

- Season 2
- Presented by: Ron Shahar
- No. of teams: 11
- Winners: Bar Ben-Vakil & Inna Broder
- No. of legs: 13
- Distance traveled: 20,300 km (12,600 mi)
- No. of episodes: 27 (30 including recaps)

Release
- Original network: Channel 2
- Original release: 25 October 2011 – 11 February 2012

Additional information
- Filming dates: 30 March – 26 April 2011; 11 January 2012

Series chronology
- ← Previous; Season 1 Next → Season 3

HaMerotz LaMillion 2 is the second season of HaMerotz LaMillion (Hebrew: המירוץ למיליון, lit. The Race to the Million), an Israeli reality competition show based on the American series The Amazing Race. Hosted by Ron Shahar, replacing Raz Meirman, it featured eleven teams of two, each with a pre-existing relationship, in a race around Eurasia to win ₪1,000,000. This season visited two continents and ten countries and traveled over 20,300 kilometres (12,600 mi) during thirteen legs. Starting in Jerusalem, racers traveled through Israel, Hungary, Bosnia and Herzegovina, Croatia, Poland, the Czech Republic, China, Thailand, and Sri Lanka before finishing in Singapore. New twists introduced in this season include a mid-leg elimination, the U-Turn and Yield Vote, the Double Battle, where two teams competed against each other in a task, and the Speed Bump. The season premiered on Channel 2 on 25 October 2011 and ended on 11 February 2012.

Painter and saleswoman Bar Ben-Vakil and Inna Broder were the winners of this season, while brothers Alon and Oren Harel finished in second place, and married Orthodox Jews Akiva and Anaelle Shmueli finished in third place.

== Production ==
=== Development and filming ===
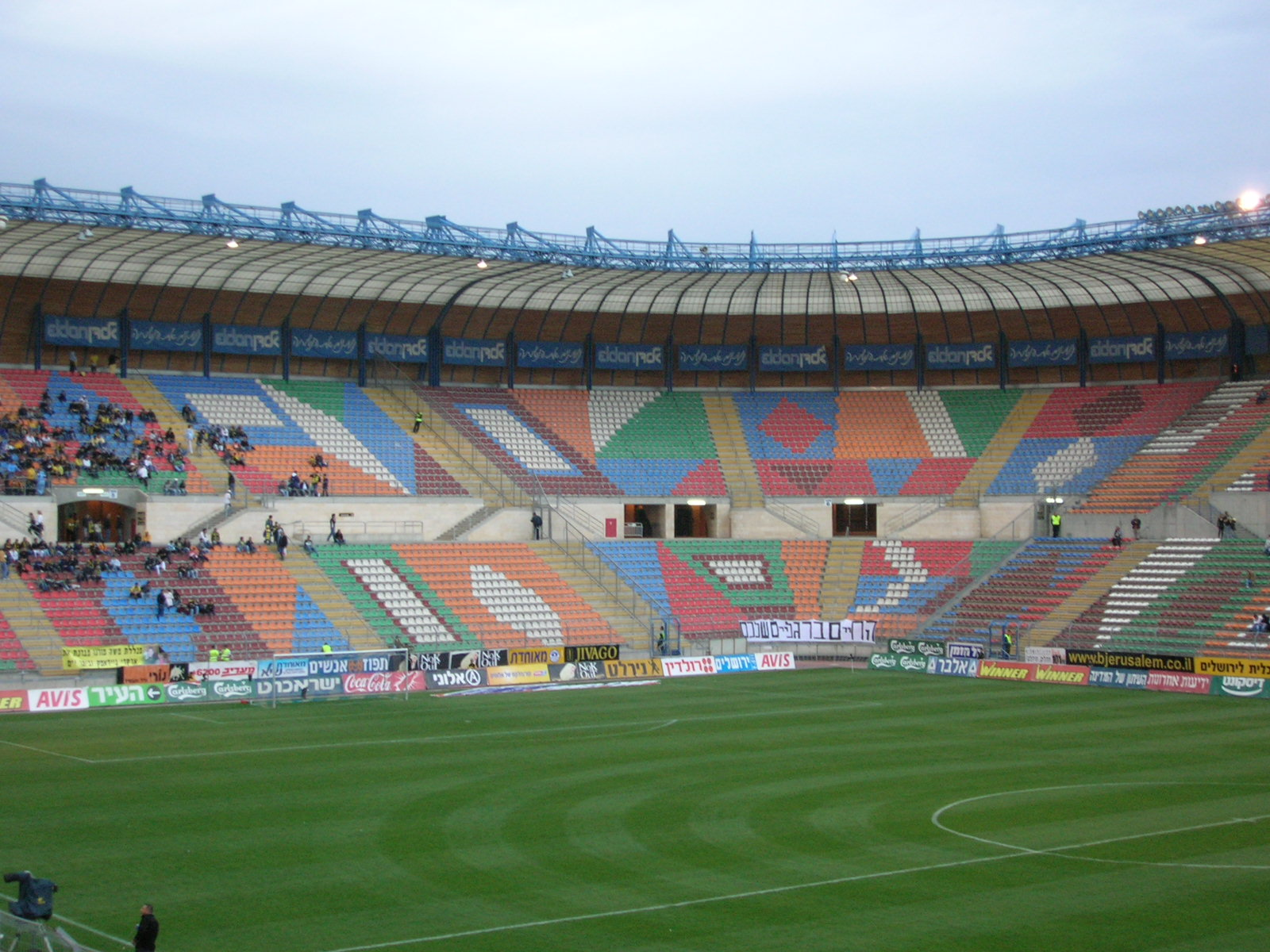
The Starting Line of the second season of HaMerotz LaMillion was at Jerusalem's Teddy Stadium.

In April 2009, during the airing of the first season, Reshet had begun preparations for a second season. They considered producing a celebrity edition of the show that would have raised the price of producing the show. Reshet had consulted with CBS and agreed it would film two more seasons at the same time to save expenses, a celebrity and non-celebrity editions. Despite this, on 20 December 2009, Reshet announced that it had cancelled the show. However, in September 2010, Reshet reconsidered, and Channel 2 greenlit the second season on 20 September 2010. On 11 February 2011, Ron Shahar was announced as the show's new host, replacing Raz Meirman.

Most filming was done in a 28-day period from 30 March to 26 April 2011, with the last leg taped on 11 January 2012. The second season spanned nine countries. Eight were previously unvisited, including Croatia, the Czech Republic, Hungary, Poland, Singapore, Sri Lanka and Thailand, as well as the first visit by an Amazing Race franchise to Bosnia and Herzegovina. China was the only previously visited nation from the previous season featured on this season.

This season introduced a franchise-first twist for the Yield and U-Turn, dubbed as a "Yield/U-Turn Vote", where during a certain point on the leg, each team could cast a vote against one team on whom they wished to Yield (which was held at the Pit Stop) or U-Turn (held during the Detour) depending on the leg. Teams (and any multiple teams in the event of a tie) who received more votes would be subjected to a Yield/U-Turn. This season also featured its first double elimination in the Israeli series when in one leg, two teams were eliminated: one at the airport in Israel, and the other at the end of the leg. This season also introduced the Duel where teams had to compete head-to-head in a pre-determined challenge, where winning teams can move on to the next challenge, while the losing team had to wait for new challengers. The team who lost the last "Duel" would face a time penalty.

Croatian-born Israeli former footballer Đovani Roso appeared as a Pit Stop greeter during Leg 3 in Dubrovnik, Croatia.

=== Casting ===
Casting for the season began on 21 November 2010 and lasted through early March 2011.

=== Blogs ===
The host recorded blogs during filming, which could be viewed on the show's website.

== Cast ==
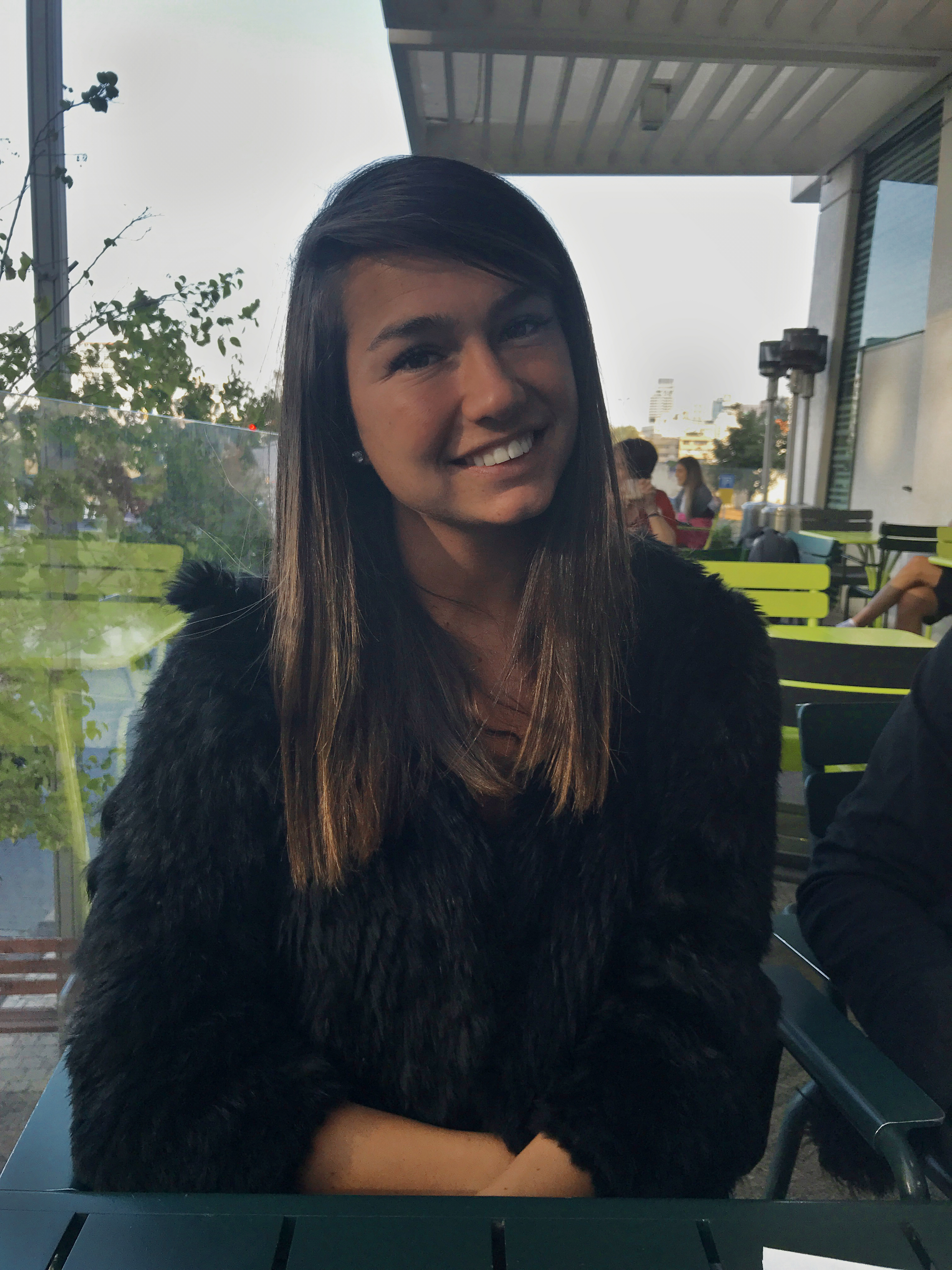
Adel Bespalov

Eleven teams competed on this season. At 18 years old, Adel was the youngest contestant on The Amazing Race excluding the American version's Family Edition. The casting of Firass & Shira led to calls from far-right groups such as Lehava for a boycott of the show due to opposition against interfaith relationships.

Contestants	Age	Relationship	Hometown	Status
Gadi Chait (גדי)	36	Friends/Bandmates	Tel Aviv	Eliminated 1st (in Tel Aviv, Israel)
Alona Ophir (אלונה)	44	Friends/Bandmates	Tel Aviv	Eliminated 1st (in Tel Aviv, Israel)
Tal Shaham (טל)	54	Mother & Daughter	Herzliya	Eliminated 2nd (in Budapest, Hungary)
Mor Shaham (מור)	29	Mother & Daughter	Herzliya	Eliminated 2nd (in Budapest, Hungary)
Nitzan Avital (ניצן)	28	Bakers	Alfei Menashe	Eliminated 3rd (in Budapest, Hungary)
Frieda "Fifi" Moshe (פיפי)	21	Bakers	Alfei Menashe	Eliminated 3rd (in Budapest, Hungary)
Firass Janluka (פיראס)	36	Muslim & Jewish Girlfriend	Nazareth Illit	Eliminated 4th (in Dubrovnik, Croatia)
Shira Dahan (שירה)	33	Muslim & Jewish Girlfriend	Nazareth Illit	Eliminated 4th (in Dubrovnik, Croatia)
Alon Apple (אלון)	32	Newlyweds	Tel Aviv	Eliminated 5th (in Prague, Czech Republic)
Hen Shiloni (חן)	28	Newlyweds	Tel Aviv	Eliminated 5th (in Prague, Czech Republic)
Idan Pundak (פונדק)	30	DJ & Security Company CEO	Petah Tikva	Eliminated 6th (in Beijing, China)
Moti Lahav (מוטי)	28	DJ & Security Company CEO	Petah Tikva	Eliminated 6th (in Beijing, China)
Osnat Shapir (אסנת)	45	Friends	Kiryat Ekron	Eliminated 7th (in Colombo, Sri Lanka)
Carmit Zacay (כרמית)	50	Friends	Kiryat Ekron	Eliminated 7th (in Colombo, Sri Lanka)
Tom Kashty (טום)	23	Footballer and Girlfriend	Petah Tikva	Eliminated 8th (in Singapore)
Adele Bespalov (אדל)	18	Footballer and Girlfriend	Tel Aviv	Eliminated 8th (in Singapore)
Akiva Shmueli (עקיבא)	28	Married Orthodox Jews	Tirat Yehuda	Third Place
Anaelle Shmueli (ענהאל)	26	Married Orthodox Jews	Tirat Yehuda	Third Place
Alon Harel (אלון)	38	Brothers	Tel Aviv	Second Place
Oren Harel (אורן)	47	Brothers	Giv'atayim	Second Place
Bar Ben-Vakil (בר)	22	Painter & Saleswoman	Netanya	Winners
Inna Broder (אינה)	23	Painter & Saleswoman	Netanya	Winners

=== Future appearances ===
Adel Bespalov later appeared on the ninth season of the Israeli edition of Big Brother along with Season 4 contestant Liron "Tiltil" Orfeli and Season 6 contestant Neta Barazani as part of a second wave of houseguests with a secret assignment in order to earn their way into the Big Brother house. Adel earned her way into the house and finished seventh. In 2020, Akiva & Anaelle appeared on the Israeli version of Wife Swap. In 2021, Bespalov competed on the third season of Power Couple VIP.

== Results ==
The following teams, with their relationships at the time of filming, participated in this season. This table is not reflective of all content broadcast on television, due to the inclusion (or exclusion) of data. Listed by finishing order:

Team	Position (by leg)														Roadblocks performed
Team	1		2+	3+	4	5+	6+	7	8+	9+	⊂10⊃	11	12	13	Roadblocks performed
Bar & Inna	7th	8th⊃	8th⊃	6th−	6th⊃	1st	3rd⊂	4th	5th<	5th⊂	1stƒ^{7}	3rd	1st	1st	Bar 4, Inna 5
Alon & Oren	5th	3rd⊃	1st⊃	2nd<	2nd⊃	2nd	2nd	1st⊂	1st−	3rd	2nd	2nd	3rd	2nd	Alon 6, Oren 4
Akiva & Anaelle	1st	1st	5th	3rd	5th	5th	1st⊃	2nd⊃	2nd>	2nd⊃	3rd^{8}	1st	2nd	3rd	Akiva 5, Anaelle 5
Tom & Adele	3rd	5th⊃	3rd⊃	5th>	7th⊂	6th	4th⊃	3rd⊃	4th>	1st⊃	4th	4th	4th		Tom 6, Adele 4
Osnat & Carmit	6th	6th	4th−^{3}	7th	4th⊃	3rdƒ^{5}	6th⊃	5th^{6}	3rd>	4th⊃−	5th				Osnat 5, Carmit 5
Pundak & Moti	2nd	2nd⊃	2nd⊃	1st	3rd	4th	5th⊃−	6th⊃							Pundak 3, Moti 4
Alon & Hen	4th	4th⊂	6th⊂	4th>	1st	7th−									Alon 3, Hen 2
Firass & Shira	8th	7th	7th	8th>^{4}											Firass 2, Shira 1^{4}
Nitzan & Fifi	9th	9th	9th												Nitzan 2, Fifi 0
Tal & Mor	10th	10th^{2}													Tal 1^{2}, Mor 0
Gadi & Alona	11th^{1}														Gadi 0, Alona 0

Key

- A red placement means the team was eliminated.
- A green ƒ indicates that the team won a Fast Forward.
- An underlined leg number indicates that there was no mandatory rest period at the Pit Stop; all teams were ordered to continue racing. An underlined team placement indicates that the team came in last, was ordered to continue racing, and didn't have to perform a Speed Bump nor were they "Marked for Elimination" in the next leg.
- A blue placement indicates that the team was the last to arrive at a Pit Stop in a non-elimination leg.
  - An underlined blue placement indicates that the team came in last on a non-elimination leg and had to perform a Speed Bump during the next leg.
  - An italicized blue placement indicates that the team was "Marked for Elimination"; if they did not place first in the next leg, they would receive a one-hour (end of Leg 6) or 30-minute (end of Leg 9) penalty.
- Italicized results indicate the position of the team told to them by Ron Shahar after they checked into the mat at Ben Gurion Airport during the midpoint of the leg.
- An orange + indicates that there was a Duel on this leg; an orange − indicates the team that lost the Duel and received a 15-minute penalty.
- A brown ⊂ indicates the team received a U-Turn; a brown ⊃ indicates that the team voted for the recipient. A brown ⊂⊃ around a leg number indicates a leg where a U-Turn was available but not used.
- A yellow < indicates a team who received a Yield, and a yellow > indicates that a team voted for the recipient.

Notes

1. Gadi & Alona were the last team to arrive at Ben Gurion Airport and were eliminated as per the provisions of Leg 1's rules (see below).
2. Tal & Mor initially arrived 8th, but were issued a 1-hour penalty as Tal was unable to complete the Roadblock. The last two teams trailing them (Bar & Inna and Nitzan & Fifi) checked in during that period, dropping Tal & Mor to last place and resulting in their elimination.
3. Osnat & Carmit were issued a 1-hour penalty for unable to complete the ice-hockey task.
4. Firass & Shira received a 1-hour penalty for not completing the Roadblock due to Shira's low blood pressure.
5. Osnat & Carmit were forced to forfeit the Duel due to Ornat's injury.
6. Osnat & Carmit initially arrived 5th, but were issued a 1-hour penalty for being "marked for elimination" and not arriving 1st. This did not affect their placement.
7. Because Bar & Inna finished 1st, their 30-minute "marked for elimination" penalty was nullified.
8. Akiva & Anaelle refused to take part in the Buddhist blessing ceremony. As such, they had to wait for the next team (Bar & Inna) to receive their blessing before they would receive their next clue.

=== Voting history ===
For the first time in Amazing Race history, teams could vote for a U-Turn or Yield. The team with the most votes received the U-Turn or Yield penalty, depending on the leg.

	U-Turn		Yield	U-Turn	U-Turn		Yield	U-Turn	
Leg #:	1	2	3	4	6	7	8	9	10
U-Turned/Yielded	Alon & Hen	Alon & Hen	Alon & Oren	Tom & Adel	Bar & Inna	Alon & Oren	Bar & Inna	Bar & Inna	Unaired
Result	4–2–2–1–1	4–1–1–1–1–1	3–2–2–1	3–2–1–1	4–2	3–1–1–1	3–2	3–2	Unaired
Voter	Team votes								
Bar & Inna	Alon & Hen	Alon & Hen	Tom & Adel	Tom & Adel	Tom & Adel	Osnat & Carmit	Akiva & Anaelle	Akiva & Anaelle	Unknown
Alon & Oren	Alon & Hen	Alon & Hen	Alon & Hen	Tom & Adel	Tom & Adel	Tom & Adel	Akiva & Anaelle	Akiva & Anaelle	Unknown
Akiva & Anaelle	Tal & Mor	Nitzan & Fifi	Bar & Inna	Alon & Oren	Bar & Inna	Alon & Oren	Bar & Inna	Bar & Inna	Unknown
Tom & Adel	Alon & Hen	Alon & Hen	Alon & Oren	Bar & Inna	Bar & Inna	Alon & Oren	Bar & Inna	Bar & Inna	Unknown
Osnat & Carmit	Firass & Shira	Tom & Adel	Bar & Inna	Tom & Adel	Bar & Inna	Pundak & Moti	Bar & Inna	Bar & Inna	Unknown
Pundak & Moti	Alon & Hen	Alon & Hen	Alon & Hen	Alon & Hen	Bar & Inna	Alon & Oren			
Alon & Hen	Pundak & Moti	Pundak & Moti	Alon & Oren	Alon & Oren					
Firass & Shira	Nitzan & Fifi	Osnat & Carmit	Alon & Oren						
Nitzan & Fifi	Firass & Shira	Firass & Shira							
Tal & Mor	Pundak & Moti								

== Episode titles ==
Translated from Hebrew from the official website:

1. Amazing Race Premiere (Leg 1)
2. Something Fire! (!משהו אש) (Leg 1)
3. The Complete Chapter (הפרק המלא) (Leg 1)
4. The Complete Chapter (הפרק המלא) (Leg 2)
5. Breaking the Ice (שוברים את הקרח) (Leg 2)
6. Does is it All End In Peace? (?האם הכל יגמר בשלום) (Leg 3)
7. For the Best? (?מעז יצא מתוק) (Leg 3)
8. Tom and Adel Being Left Behind (טום ואדל נשארים מאחור) (Leg 4)
9. The Opportunity of a Lifetime (הזדמנות של פעם בחיים) (Leg 4)
10. The Baptism of Fire! (!טבילת אש) (Leg 5)
11. Dangerous Game (משחק מסוכן) (Leg 5)
12. Legendary Race! (!מירוץ מהאגדות) (Leg 5)
13. It's All the Magic (זה כל הקסם) (Recap)
14. Chinese is a Hard Language (סינית שפה קשה) (Leg 6)
15. Sweet Pain? (?כאב מתוק) (Leg 6)
16. Walls of Hope (חומות של תקווה) (Leg 7)
17. No Limits! (!חסרי מעצורים) (Leg 7)
18. Who Will Enter the Final Quintet? (?מי יכנס לחמישיית הגמר) (Leg 7)
19. Conquering Bangkok (כובשים את בנגקוק) (Leg 8)
20. Non-Stop Race (מירוץ ללא הפסקה) (Leg 8)
21. Going Low (יורדים נמוך) (Legs 8 and 9)
22. Homesick (מתגעגעים הביתה) (Leg 9)
23. Leaving Thailand (נפרדים מתאילנד) (Leg 9)
24. The Greatest Moments of the Race (הרגעים הגדולים של המירוץ) (Recap)
25. Dreaming About a Place in the Final (חולמים על מקום בגמר) (Leg 10)
26. The Teams in the Race of Their Lives! (!הזוגות במירוץ חייהם) (Leg 10)
27. The Final Battle on the way to the Final (הקרב האחרון בדרך אל הגמר) (Leg 11)
28. Last Step to the Million! (!צעד אחרון למיליון) (Leg 12)
29. The Sky's the Limit (השמיים הם הגבול) (Leg 13)
30. Reunion (Recap)

== Prizes ==
- Legs 1-7, 9-10 – A vacation

== Race summary ==
Route map

Destinations	Air travel Rail travel Water travel Bus travel Helicopter travel Bicycle travel Gondola travel
Route Markers	צומת (Detour) מחסום (Roadblock) קיצור דרך (Fast Forward) עצור (Yield) מסלול משותף (Intersection) סיבוב פרסה (U-Turn) דו–קרב (Duel) פס האטה (Speed Bump) נקודת סיום (Pit Stop)

=== Leg 1 (Israel → Hungary) ===
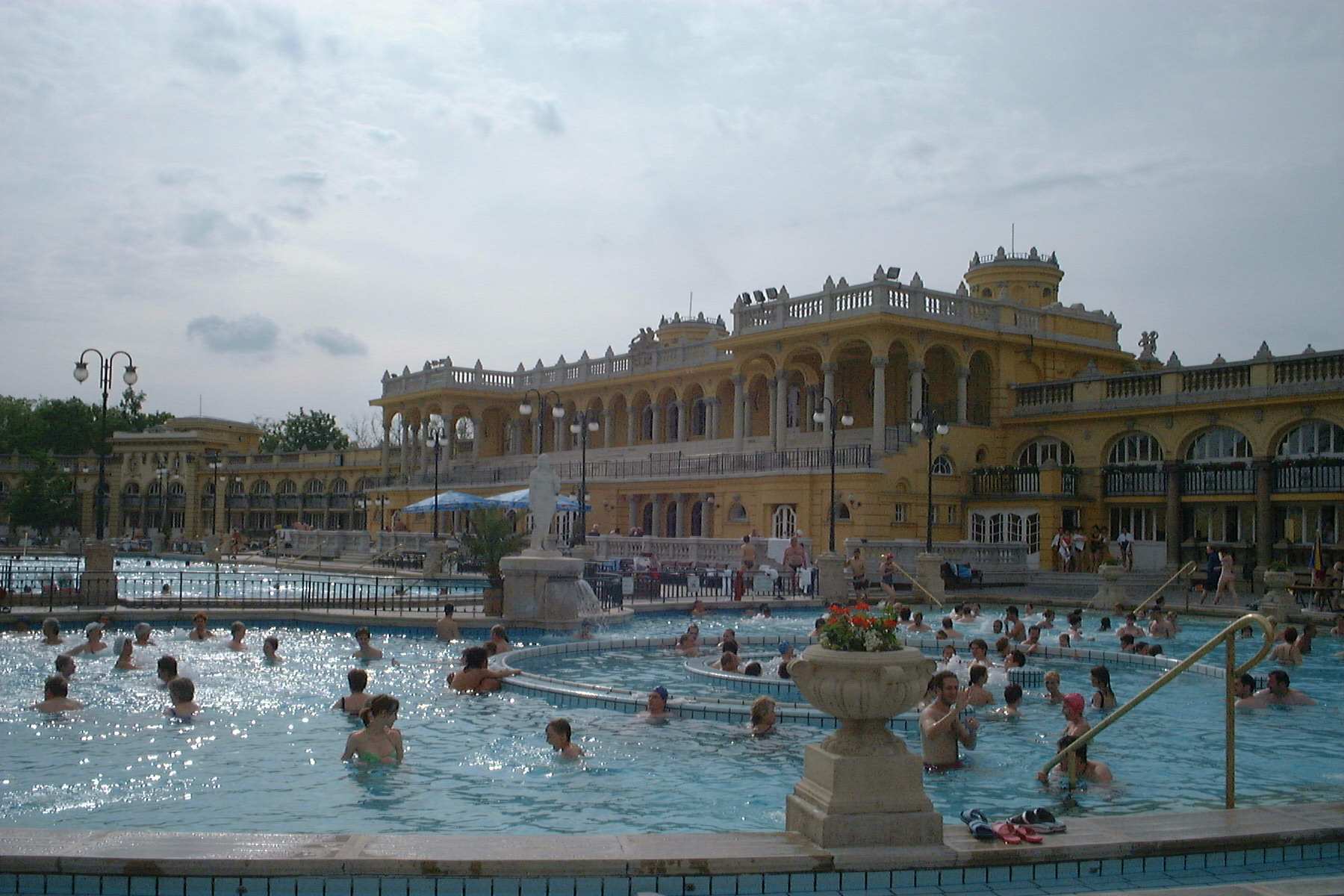
Teams ended the first leg at Budapest's Széchenyi thermal bath.

Airdates: 25 & 30 October, 1 November 2011

- Jerusalem, Israel (Teddy Stadium) (Starting Line)
- Ruhama (Nahal Shikma)
- Tel Aviv (Ben Gurion Airport – Terminal 3) (Elimination Point)
- Tel Aviv (Ben Gurion Airport) to Budapest, Hungary (Budapest Liszt Ferenc International Airport)
- Pilisvörösvár (Shivabenstube Restaurant)
- Puss Laci (Pigsty)
- Budapest (Gundel Restaurant or City Park)
- Budapest (City Park)
- Budapest (Óbuda Square)
- Mogyoród (Astra Filmstudios)
- Budapest (Széchenyi Thermal Bath)

This season's first Detour was a choice between קרקס (Qerqes – Circus) or ואלס (Vales – Waltz). In Circus, teams had to perform circus acts. One team member had to walk on a tightrope, and the other team member had to balance on a board placed on a wheel to receive their next clue. In Waltz, teams had to learn and perform a waltz for a panel of judges with teams needing to score at least 20 points to receive their next clue.

In this season's first Roadblock, one team member would be slowly lowered into a vat of water with their hands and feet secured by iron chains much like Hungarian escape artist Harry Houdini and had to escape by finding the correct keys from a set of keys to unlock their shackles and receive their next clue.

Additional tasks

- At Teddy Stadium, teams had to retrieve the key for their vehicle by untangling a pile of ropes. They then had to climb rope ladders to reach a platform suspended by a crane, where their car was sitting, and enter the car. After honking the horn, teams would be lowered to the ground and would receive their next clue.
- At Wadi Shiqma, teams had to listen to a series of songs performed by a choir, three of which would reference a specific color. After recognizing the colors, red, white, and green (the colors of the flag of Hungary), they had to search for three balls with the three colors among a field full of balls. The correct colored balls had numbers on them (3, 6, 7), and teams could use them to unlock a box in their car containing their next clue, which directed teams to Ben Gurion Airport and had tickets to their first destination: Budapest. The first five teams to check-in and give the tickets to Ron Shahar would be on the first flight from Tel Aviv to Budapest, and the next five teams would be on the second flight. The last team to arrive would be eliminated.
- At the restaurant in Pilisvörösvár, while sharing only one glass of water per team, teams had to eat a bowl of spicy goulash to receive their next clue. They would then vote for the team they wished to U-Turn.
- At the pig sty in Puss Laci, each team member had to catch a piglet and hand them to a farmer before receiving their next clue.
- At Óbuda Square, teammates had to face each other with one holding a soda syphon and the other with a glass above their head. The one with the syphon had to squirt soda towards their partner to try and fill up the glass to receive their next clue. If their syphon was emptied, they had to drink a cup of soda before it would be refilled.
- On their way to Astra Filmstudios, teams would be tied up in straitjackets and had to get a cab to take them to the destination.
- After the Roadblock, teams had to solve one side of a Rubik's Cube, which featured a picture of the Széchenyi thermal bath on it, to learn that the bath was their first Pit Stop.

=== Leg 2 (Hungary) ===
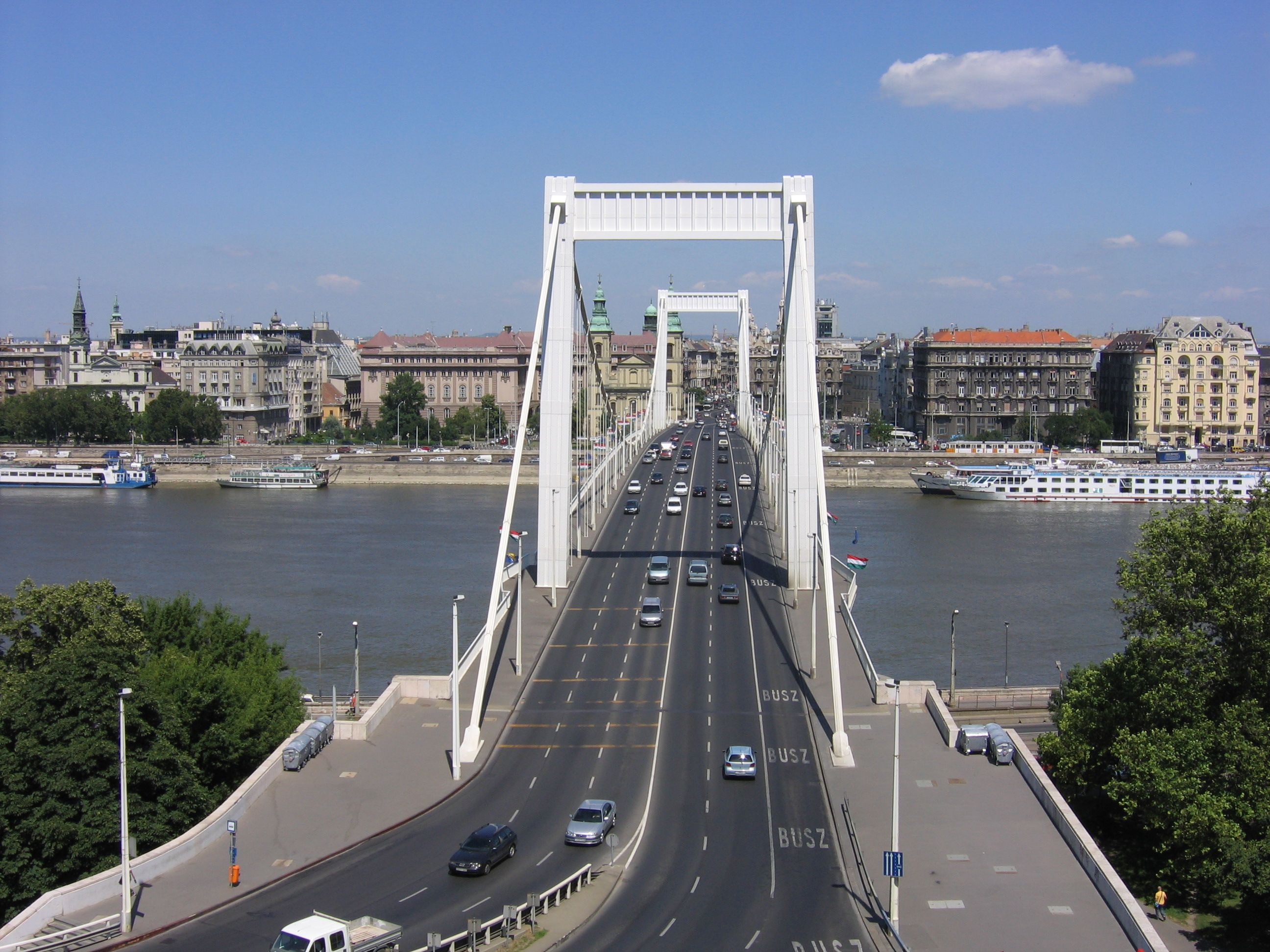
At Elisabeth Bridge, teams had to count the bridge's columns.

Airdates: 6 & 8 November 2011

- Budapest (Pesterzsébet Ice Arena)
- Budapest (Almássy Tér (in Hungarian))
- Budapest (Ligetvaros Irodahaz or Nap TV)
- Budapest (Miksport Bt.)
- Budapest (Dohány Street Synagogue)
- Budapest (Elisabeth Square)
- Budapest (Elisabeth Bridge)
- Budapest (Buda Castle)

For this series' first Duel, two teams had to wrestle in a tub of chocolate syrup while trying to fill the rival team's jar with chocolate. When a team filled a jar, they would receive their next clue while the team that lost had to wait for the next team. The team that lost the final Duel had to wait out a 15-minute penalty.

This leg's Detour was a choice between כוכב קולנוע (Khocheb Qelnoah – Movie Star) or כוכב טלוויזיה (Khocheb Televyziah – TV Star). In Movie Star, team members had to correctly dub five phrases Hungarian film scene at Ligetvaros Irodahaz to receive their next clue. In TV Star, teams traveled to Nap TV, where team members had to read the weather forecast for Hungary from a teleprompter, which was written entirely in Hungarian though the text was transliterated into Hebrew characters, to receive their next clue.

In this leg's Roadblock, one team member had to break open a block of ice to access their next clue, a picture of the Elisabeth Bridge, frozen inside, using a variety of unusual tools.

Additional tasks

- At the Pesterzsébet Ice Arena, one team member had to score two goals against a young professional goalie. Meanwhile, their partner had to hold a large, heavy block of ice. The hockey-playing team member could only attempt to shoot goals while their partner held the block of ice off the floor. If they dropped it, the one playing hockey had to stop. When two goals were scored, they would receive their next clue. They would then vote for the team they wished to U-Turn.
- At the Dohány Street Synagogue, teams had to convince five people to wear a beard and imitate Theodor Herzl by leaning on a fence, mimicking a famous photo of Herzl's, and saying his famous phrase, "Im Tirzu Ein Zo Agada". After each team photographed five people doing this, they received their next clue.
- At Elisabeth Bridge, teams had to count the number of posts on the bridge and then use the number obtained (2,377) to open a four digit combination lock on a box containing their next clue.

=== Leg 3 (Hungary → Bosnia and Herzegovina → Croatia) ===
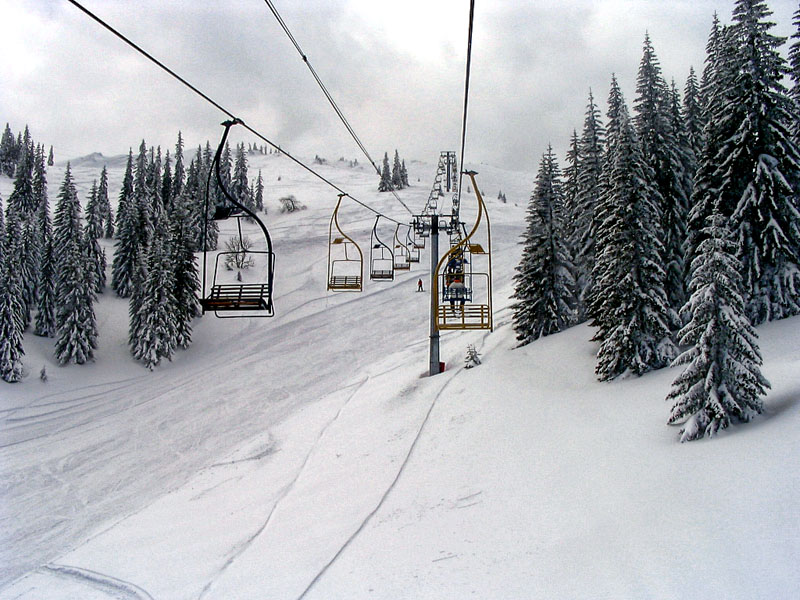
At Jahorina Ski Resort, one team member had to wear a swimsuit and ride down the ski hill tied to snowmobile in −8 °C (18 °F) weather.

Airdates: 13 & 15 November 2011

- Budapest (Budapest-Déli Railway Terminal) to Sarajevo, Bosnia and Herzegovina (Sarajevo Main Railway Station)
- Sarajevo (Gavrilo Princip Bridge)
- Sarajevo (Old Town Square)
- Jahorina (Hotel Termag) (Overnight Rest)
- Jahorina (Jahorina Ski Resort)
- Mostar (Stari Most)
- Dubrovnik, Croatia (Sport Center)
- Dubrovnik (Gradska Kavana)
- Dubrovnik (Walls of Dubrovnik)
- Dubrovnik (Lady Pi-Pi Statue)
- Dubrovnik (Walls of Dubrovnik – Minčeta Tower)

For this leg's Duel, two teams played musical chairs with each other and local residents. The last team with a team member remaining in the game would receive their next clue while the team that lost had to wait for the next team. The team that lost the final Duel had to wait out a 15-minute penalty.

In this leg's Roadblock, one team member had to strip down to their swimsuit, put on skis, and be towed through a slalom course behind a snowmobile. When they reached the end without falling, they had to let go of their tow rope and coast through the finish line to receive their next clue.

This leg's Detour was a choice between כדורגל (Kaduregel – Soccer) or כדורסל (Kadursal – Basketball). In Soccer, one team member had to kick a soccer ball through three targets while their partner, dressed as a cheerleader, cheered them on. When the first member scored three goals, they would switch roles. Once both members scored three goals, they would receive their next clue. In Basketball, teams played against two Croatian basketball players and had to score 20 baskets (10 apiece). At least one basket had to be scored while using a trampoline, a ladder, a supermarket cart and a chair before they could receive their next clue.

Additional tasks

- At Sarajevo Main Railway Station, teams voted for the team they wished to Yield.
- At the Gavrilo Princip Bridge, one team member had to throw sardines at their partner, who had to catch a sardine in their mouth and eat it without using their hands to receive their next clue. After every five misses, the team member tossing sardines had to eat a salted sardine.
- At Gradska Kavana, both team members had to eat 1.5 kilograms (3.3 lb) of cremeschnitte without using their hands before receiving their next clue.
- At the Walls of Dubrovnik, one team member had to climb a wall using a mechanical ascender. The wall was divided into three sections, and they were not allowed to ascend past a section unless their partner collected 5 kuna from passersby. After they finished climbing, teams would receive their next clue.
- At the water-fountain sculpture of Lady Pi-Pi, each team member had to drink a glass of water before continuing to the Pit Stop.

=== Leg 4 (Croatia → Poland) ===
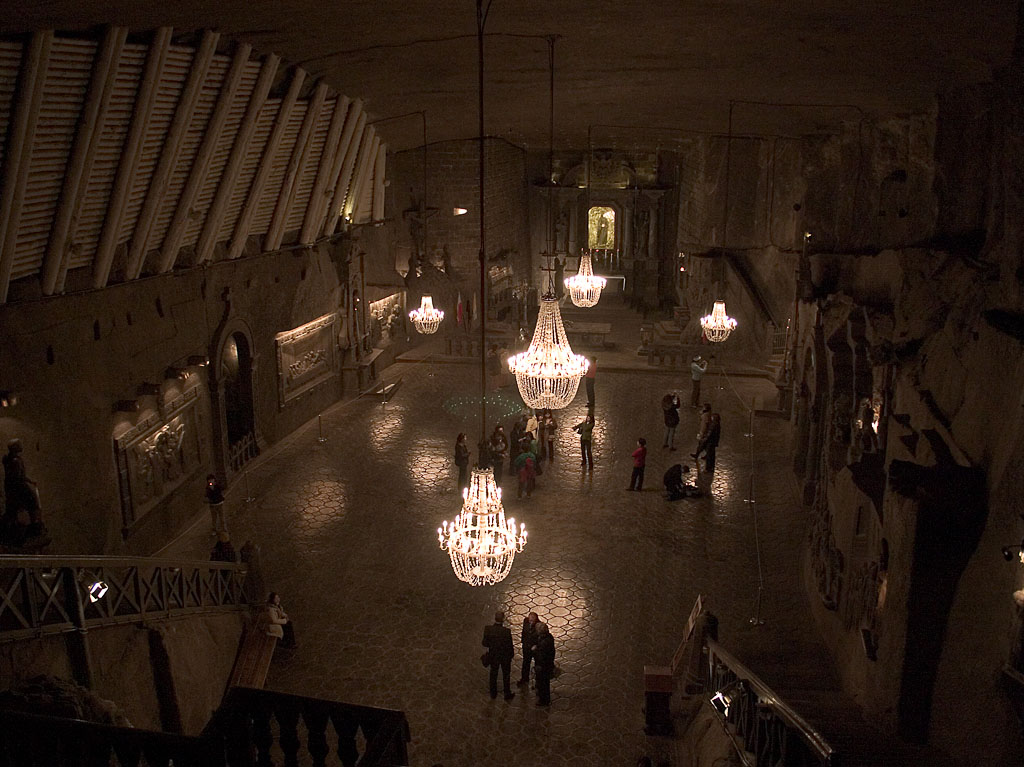
At the Wieliczka Salt Mine near Kraków, racers performed the leg's Roadblock.

Airdates: 20 & 22 November 2011

- Dubrovnik (Dubrovnik Airport) to Kraków, Poland (Kraków John Paul II International Airport)
- Kraków (Main Market Square)
- Kraków (Kazimierz)
- Kraków (Klezmer-Hois)
- Kraków (Szeroka Street or Klezmer-Hois)
- Kraków (Wolf Popper Synagogue)
- Kraków (Opera Krakowska)
- Wieliczka (Wieliczka Salt Mine)
- Kraków (Grodzka Street)
- Kraków (16 Sebastianna Street)

This leg's Detour was a choice between חכמי חלם (Hachmey HaChełm – Men of Chełm) or קניידלעך (Qenyeydel'ek – Matzo Balls). In Men of Chełm, teams had to load a series of six buckets onto a pole that they had to carry on their shoulders. After filling two buckets and placing them on the pole, teams had to walk backwards across the Jewish Square through a series of garbage bins, stopping twice to fill up a pair of buckets. The buckets had holes in them and would leak water as they ran. At the end of the course, teams would pour their water into a large bucket. Once it reached a certain point, teams would dump the large bucket into a well and receive their next clue. In Matzo Balls, teams had to listen to an accordionist and recognize the two songs he was playing (Hava Nagila and Siman Tov u'Mazel Tov) to receive their next clue. However, he would begin by only playing a single note. To "purchase" another note, both team members had to eat two matzo balls.

In this leg's Roadblock, one team member had to push a heavy cart of salt blocks from the Chapel of Saint Kinga through the mines to a hall. They then had to lick a salt wall until they found a spot that tasted sweet. When found, they had to dig through the salt-block cart for a crystal key to unlock their next clue.

Additional tasks

- At Main Market Square, teams had to convince passersby to help them carry a Fiat 126 from one end of the square to the other, without letting it roll along the ground. Afterwards, the team and everyone who helped them had to get into the car and close the door for five seconds before receiving their next clue. They would then vote for the team they wished to U-Turn.
- At Kazimierz, teams had to use a tablet for one minute to find jokes on the Internet about Polish people. They would then use the tablet to contact three Israeli entertainers (Tzipi Shavit, Hanny Nahmias and Irit Anavi) and tell them the jokes. If the comedians believed that all five jokes were funny, they would direct teams to their next clue outside Klezmer-Hois.
- At Opera Krakowska, teams had to dress in tutus and learn a sequence of ballet steps from Swan Lake. If teams performed them to the teacher's satisfaction, they would receive their next clue.
- At Grodzka Street, one team member had to ask pedestrians to give them a kiss on the cheek while the other one had to take tablet photos of the kiss. Once they obtained 50 kisses from locals, they would receive their next clue. For religious reasons, Akiva & Anaelle were permitted to do this task with air kisses.

=== Leg 5 (Poland → Czech Republic) ===
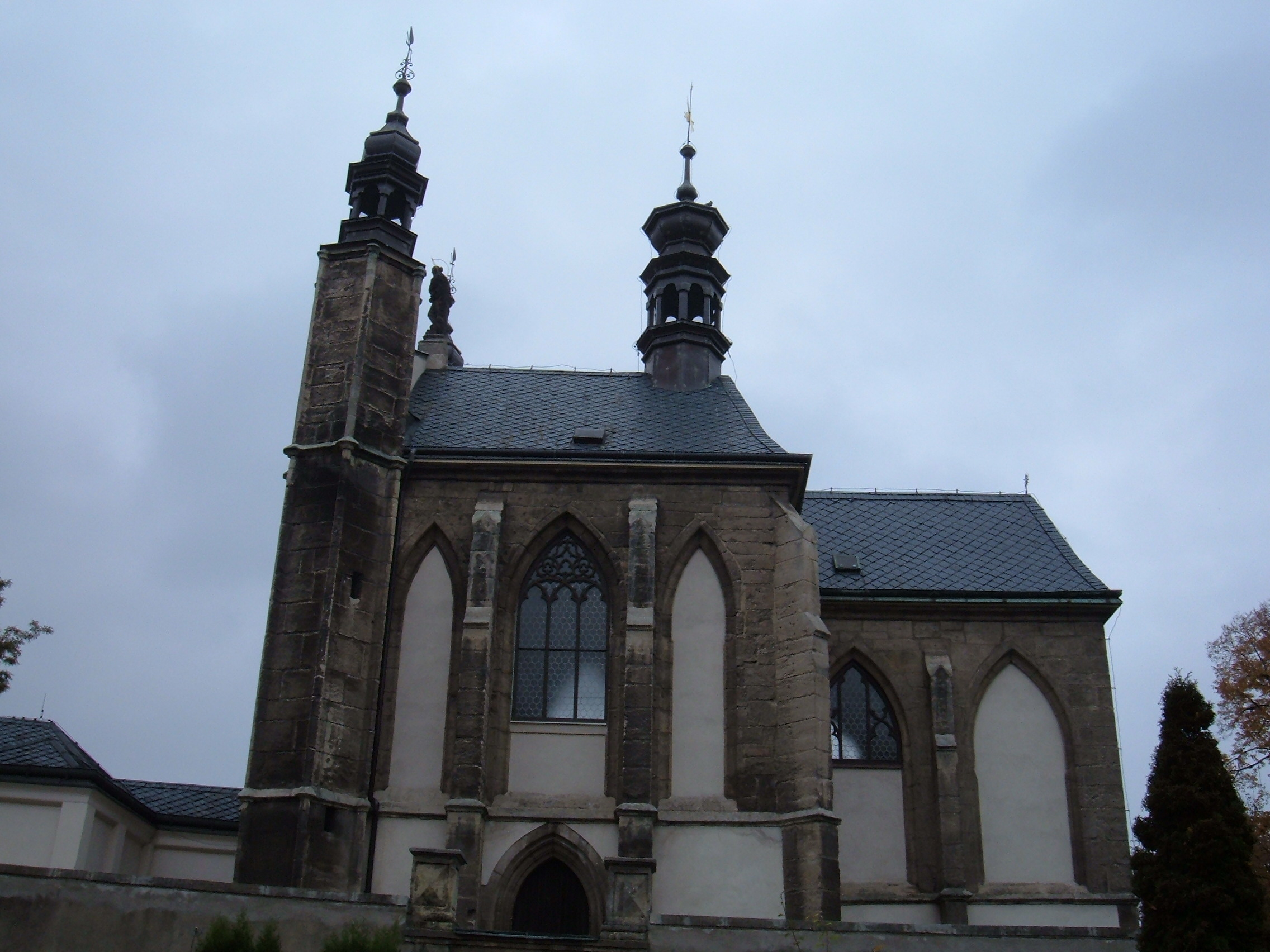
At the Church of Bones, the teams had to count the number of skulls in the main hall.

Airdates: 27 & 29 November, 5 December 2011

- Kraków (Kraków Główny Railway Station) to Kutná Hora, Czech Republic (Kutná Hora Hlavní Nádraží (in Czech))
- Kutná Hora (Church of Bones)
- Prague (Stará Čistírna Odpadních Vod)
- Prague (Florence Street (in Czech))
- Prague (Trafika Store) (Overnight Rest)
- Prague (Wenceslas Square)
  - Prague (Academy of Fine Arts)
- Prague (Old Town Square)
  - Prague (Hybernská Street & Náměstí Republiky)
- Prague (Malá Strana Bridge Tower & Na Kampě)
- Prague (Střelecký Island)

For this leg's Duel, two teams had to put on roller skates and dress as witches. They had to roll around a room, collecting animatronic bats hanging from the ceiling and then throw them into a cauldron. The first team to collect four bats would receive their next clue while the team that lost had to wait for the next team. The team that lost the final Duel had to wait out a 15-minute penalty.

In this leg's Roadblock, one team member had to put on a protective suit and perform an action movie stunt. They would be lit on fire and had to run around flaming barrels to a table with three briefcases. They had to open these briefcases until they found the one containing their next clue, after which they would be extinguished.

In this season's first Fast Forward, one team had to model nude for art students until the class was complete to win the Fast Forward award.

After the tour guide task, Tom & Adel found their Speed Bump on Hybernská Street. For their Speed Bump, Tom & Adel had to sing "Jožin z bažin" and earn Kč100 from passersby on Náměstí Republiky before they could continue racing.

Additional tasks

- At the Church of Bones, one team member had to correctly count the number of skulls in the main hall (936) while their partner read aloud a Hebrew-language pamphlet describing the church's history, possibly distracting them, to receive their next clue.
- At Stará Čistírna Odpadních Vod, teams entered the tunnels and found a witch chamber. There, they had to search among the room's various items for their next clue and had to figure out that they had to use the witch's broom to sweep the sawdust on the floor, which would reveal the phrase "follow the light of the lanterns" leading them to follow a path of lanterns to their next clue.
- At Trafika Store, the teams had to find their next clue in one of three local newspapers.
- At the Old Town Square, teams had to act as tour guides and take a tourist on a carriage ride. The carriage would stop at three monuments, and they had to describe the monument in English to their tourist. While they did not have to be factually accurate, they had to use all seven words that were given to them for each monument. If they were successful, they would receive their next clue.
- After the preceding task, teams had to find two girls named Jana or Yana. Teams had to buy each them gifts using their own money, and get a photograph with them. They then had to show their photographs to a knight near the Malá Strana Bridge Tower to receive their next clue.
- At the Malá Strana Bridge Tower, teams donned suits of armor. They then had to carry a medieval sedan chair with a tiara in it and had to find a princess on Na Kampě. When they found her, they would present her with the tiara and she would simply point at the sedan chair. Teams had to figure out that their next clue was attached to the underside.

=== Leg 6 (Czech Republic → China) ===
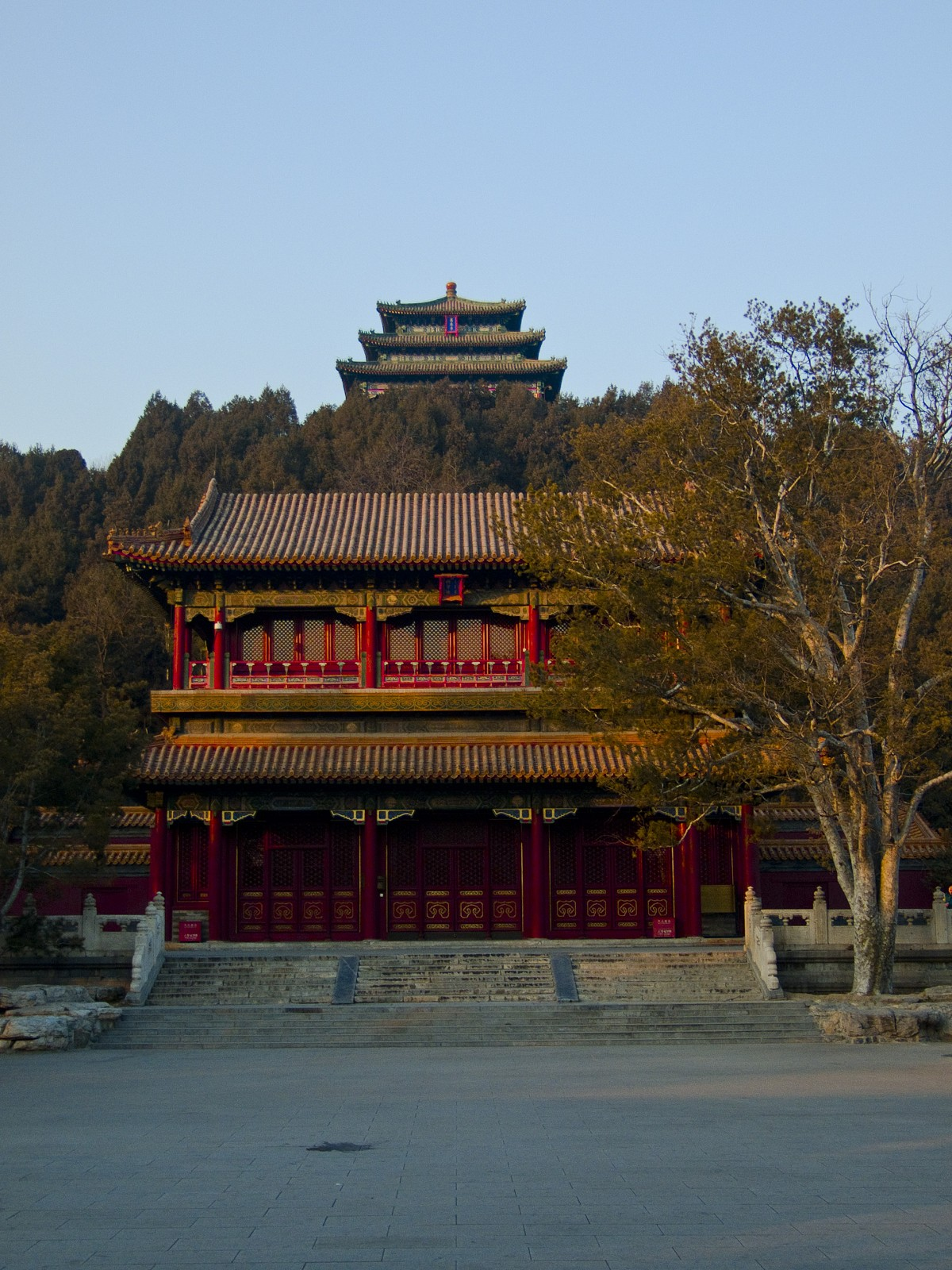
The season's sixth Pit Stop was located at Jingshan Park.

Airdates: 11 & 14 December 2011

- Prague (Prague Ruzyně Airport) to Beijing, China (Beijing Capital International Airport)
- Beijing (Beijing Sport University – National Training Center Complex)
- Beijing (Huode Zhenjun Temple)
- Beijing (Nine Gates Snack Restaurant)
- Beijing (Liangzi Foot Massage Palace)
- Beijing (798 Art Zone)
- Beijing (798 Space)
- Beijing (Jingshan Park)

For this leg's Duel, teams competed in a sunflower seed-cracking race. Teams had to crack open sunflower seeds with their mouths, and the first team to fill their scale with 25 grams (0.88 oz) of de-shelled seeds would receive their next clue while the team that lost had to wait for the next team. The team that lost the final Duel had to wait out a 15-minute penalty.

This leg's Detour was a choice between מלצרות (Meltzerot – Waitressing) or גלגל ביש המזל (Gelgel Beysh HaMazel – Wheel of Misfortune). For both Detour options, teams had to travel by a marked-pedicab to Nine Gates Snack Restaurant. In Waitressing, teams had to take orders from eight restaurant patrons, spoken in Mandarin Chinese. Teams then had to go into the kitchen, retrieve the correct dishes and serve them to the correct people to receive their next clue. In Wheel of Misfortune, each team member had to spin a Lazy Susan with the names of Chinese meals on it and eat whatever they landed on to receive their next clue.

In this leg's Roadblock, one team member had to drink a cup of medicinal tea then endure a painful 20-minute reflexology foot massage before receiving their next clue from the masseuse. If they stopped the massage, they would have to endure another 20-minute session.

Additional tasks

- At the National Training Center Complex, teams had to choose one of three gymnastic exercises (balance beam, parallel bars, or ribbons) and perform their chosen activity to the satisfaction of a trainer to receive their next clue and two pairs of Manchu platform shoess, which they had to wear for the rest of the leg. They would then vote for the team they wished to U-Turn.
- At 798 Art Zone, teams would listen to the Hebrew version of "Drei Chinesen mit dem Kontrabass". They then had to find the characters mentioned in the song (two young Chinese men with a contrabass being chased by a police officer) and sing the song to them to receive their next clue.
- At 798 Space, teams had to count the number of stuffed toys with a "Made in China" label to receive their next clue. They had to be careful as some of the toys had a "Made in Israel" tag instead.

Additional notes

- At Prague Ruzyně Airport, teams had to find an Issta counter to pick up their tickets to Beijing. The first three teams to arrive would be on the first flight while the remaining three teams would be on the second flight.
- The original Pit Stop was located at Jingshan Park's top pavilion. However, due to operating hours, it was relocated to the park's entrance after two of the teams had checked in.

=== Leg 7 (China) ===
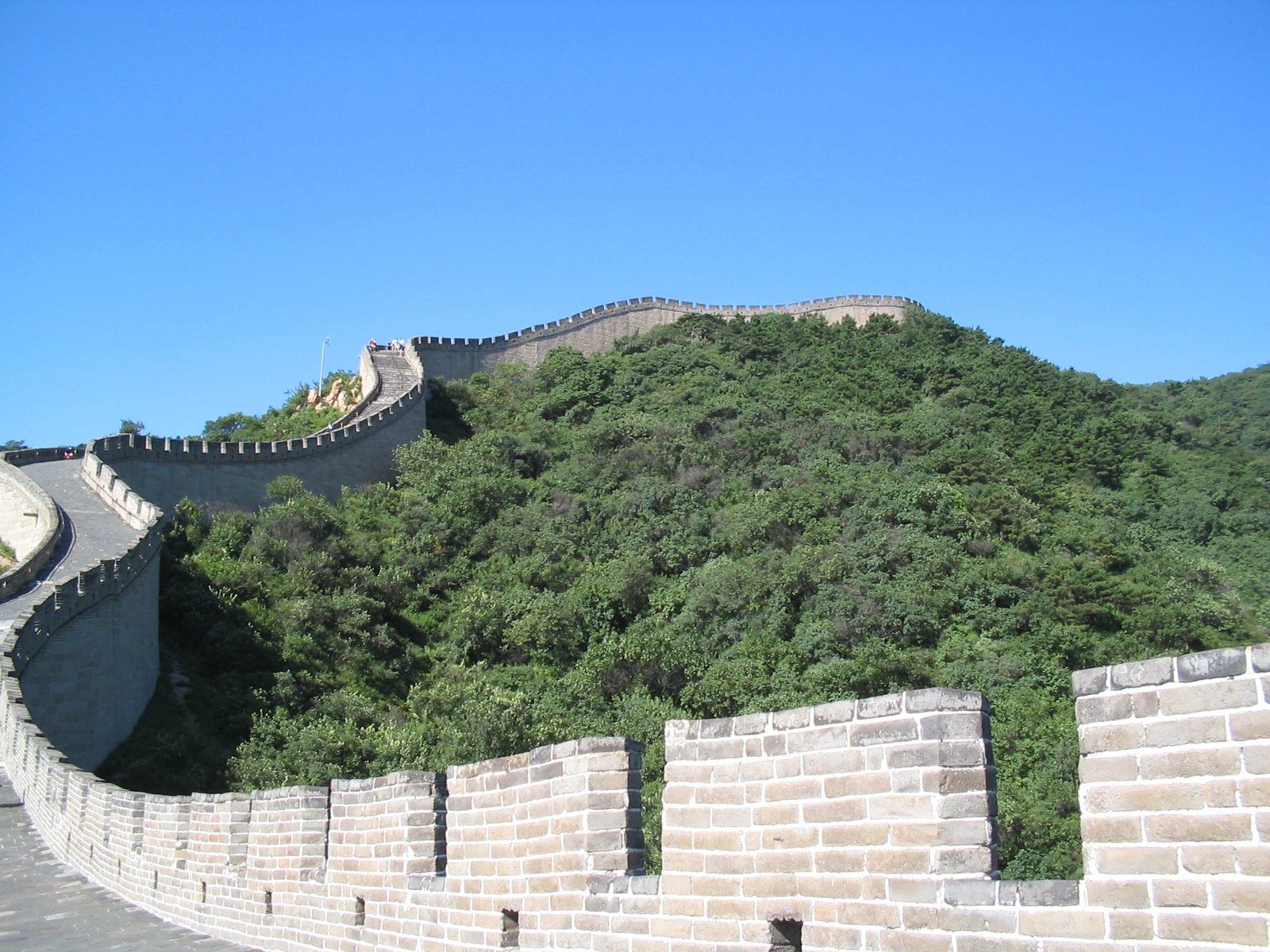
The teams visited the Great Wall of China, rode a chairlift, and searched for words related to China.

Airdates: 18, 20 & 25 December 2011

- Beijing (Huanghuazhen Maze)
- Beijing (Great Wall of China – Mutianyu)
- Beijing (Yuan Dadu City Wall Ruins Park)
- Beijing (Beijing Film Studio (in Chinese))
- Beijing (Zhongguancun)
- Beijing (Jiang Tai China Market)
- Beijing (Huguang Guild Hall)

This leg's Detour was a choice between שפיץ (Shpeytz – Spitz) or קפיץ (Q'feytz – Spring). In Spitz the teams had to learn to play the local version of hackysack called jianzi and bounce a shuttlecock between one another 25 times with only their feet and upturned palms to receive their next clue. In Spring, one team member had to learn how to play "Twinkle, Twinkle, Little Star" on an erhu while their partner had to learn how to sing the song in Mandarin and then perform to the judge's satisfaction to receive their next clue.

In this leg's Roadblock, one team member had to prove themselves worthy of a Chinese bride. They had to apply red lipstick and write "I love you" on a piece of paper with kisses and then brush their teeth with wasabi-flavored toothpaste for one minute to receive their next clue.

Additional tasks

- At the Huanghuazhen Maze, teams had to enter the maze, where they would find many various items. Teams had to find four items that were invented in China, of which there were only five in the maze. They then had to bring them to a Chinese sage in the center of the maze. If they guessed correctly, they would receive their next clue and a large plush of Mushi (Beijing's giant panda). They would then vote for the team they wished to U-Turn.
- At Mutianyu, teams rode a chairlift to a point on the wall, where they were given a Hebrew-language word search containing words related to China from a Chinese warrior. They had to climb hundreds of steps to the fifth tower, where they had to completed the word search. They then climbed more steps to the next guard tower, where they would exchange their completed word search and panda for their next clue. The teams then rode a luge down a track back to the entrance.
- At Zhongguancun, teams have to gather 10 Chinese locals and teach them to dance while singing "Hava Nagila" to receive their next clue.
- At the Jiang Tai China Market, teams dressed in bulky elephant costumes and then had to walk through narrow store aisles while trying not to knock over the china plates and glasses lining the store shelves. Once they reached the end, they would be assigned a time penalty based on how much they broke and had to spend the penalty gluing the broken china back together before receiving their next clue.

=== Leg 8 (China → Thailand) ===
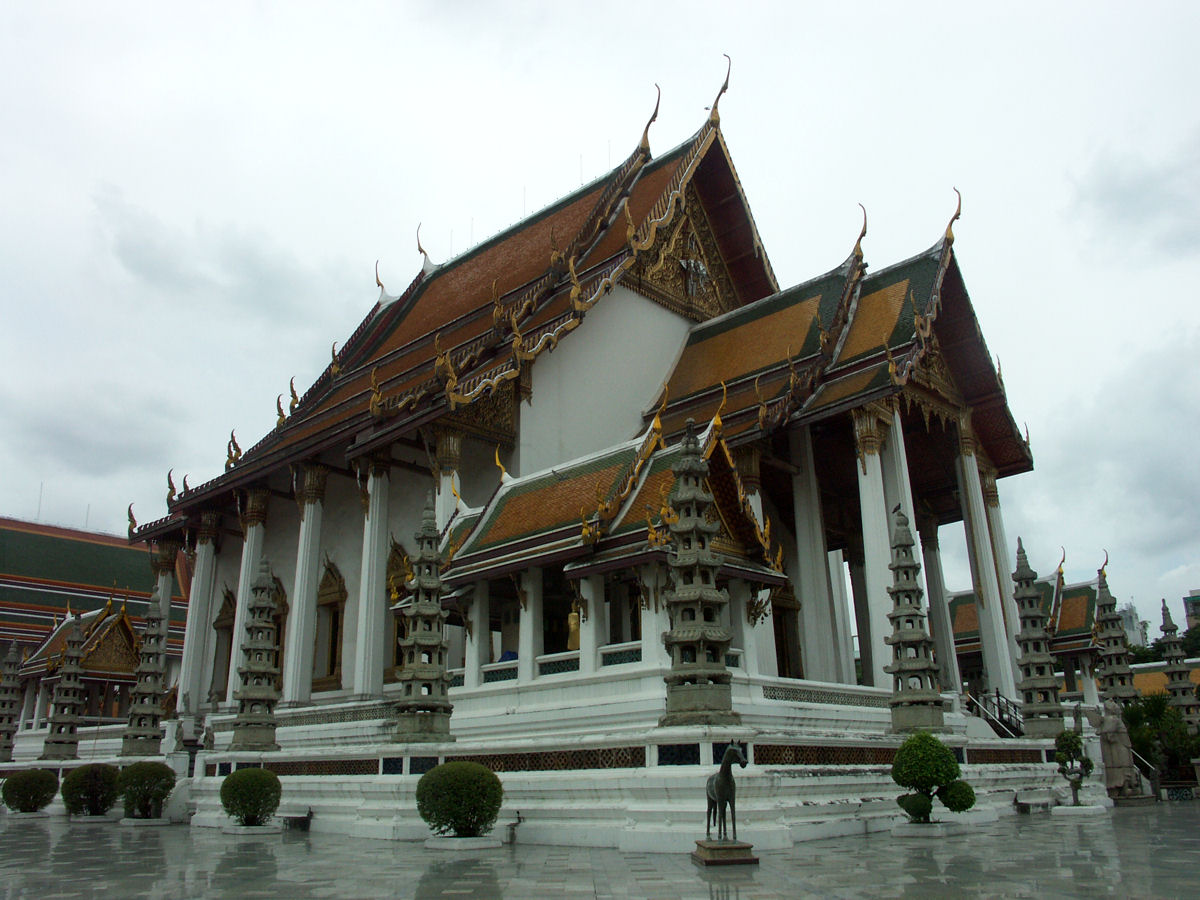
Wat Suthat in Bangkok was the Pit Stop for this leg.

Airdates: 4, 5 & 11 January 2012

- Beijing (Beijing Capital International Airport) to Bangkok, Thailand (Suvarnabhumi Airport)
- Bangkok (Siam Ocean World)
- Bangkok (Wat Thewarat Kunchorn Worawihan)
- Bangkok (Kampraya Gallery) (Overnight Rest)
- Bangkok (Chatuchak Weekend Market)
- Bangkok (Sasiprapa Gym)
- Bangkok (Shoshana Restaurant)
- Bangkok (Phahurat Market – Jintaporn)
- Bangkok (B. Bogie's Collections)
- Bangkok (Wat Suthat)

For this leg's Duel, one team member had to meditate with a bowl of water balanced on their head. The other team member had to distract the meditating team member on the other team and make them drop the bowl. After five minutes, they were allowed to tickle their opponent with a feather. The first team member to drop their bowl would lose the Duel and had to wait for the next team while their opponents would receive their next clue. The team that lost the final Duel had to wait out a 15-minute penalty.

This leg's Detour was a choice between לקנות (Leqnot – Buy) or למכור (Lemkhor – Sell). In Buy, teams had to purchase ten items pictured in a book from around the market, using only the 9,000 Thai baht provided to them in their clue. This money was not enough to afford all of the items, so team needed to barter with the store owners. After purchasing the items, teams could exchange them for their next clue. In Sell, teams had to persuade 20 Thai people to eat a falafel. Despite the task's name, the falafels were given away for free. After 20 Thai locals each ate an entire falafel at team's food cart, teams would receive their next clue.

In this leg's Roadblock, one team member had to learn two Muay Thai exercises and perform them correctly against a Thai boxer to receive their next clue.

Additional tasks

- At Siam Ocean World, one team member had to dive into an aquarium full of sharks. The other team member would be given a series of Hebrew sentences with certain words highlighted. One by one, they had to pantomime the words to their partner, who had to pick up boards with the corresponding words off the aquarium floor. After all the correct words were found, teams would receive their next clue.
- At the Kampraya Gallery, teams voted for the team they wished to Yield.
- At Shoshana Restaurant, teams had to find ten Israeli tourists in the area and give each of them a matching t-shirt. The ten locals then had to join the team members and sing "Shoshana, Shoshana" to the restaurant's owner to receive their next clue.
- At Phahurat Market, teams had to search for a marked store and find a roll of fabric with the team's names. They then had to travel by tuk-tuk to Bogie the Tailor, so he could make them two suits. Once the suits were complete, teams would put on their suits, would receive their next clue, and had to wear their suits as they traveled to the Pit Stop.

=== Leg 9 (Thailand) ===
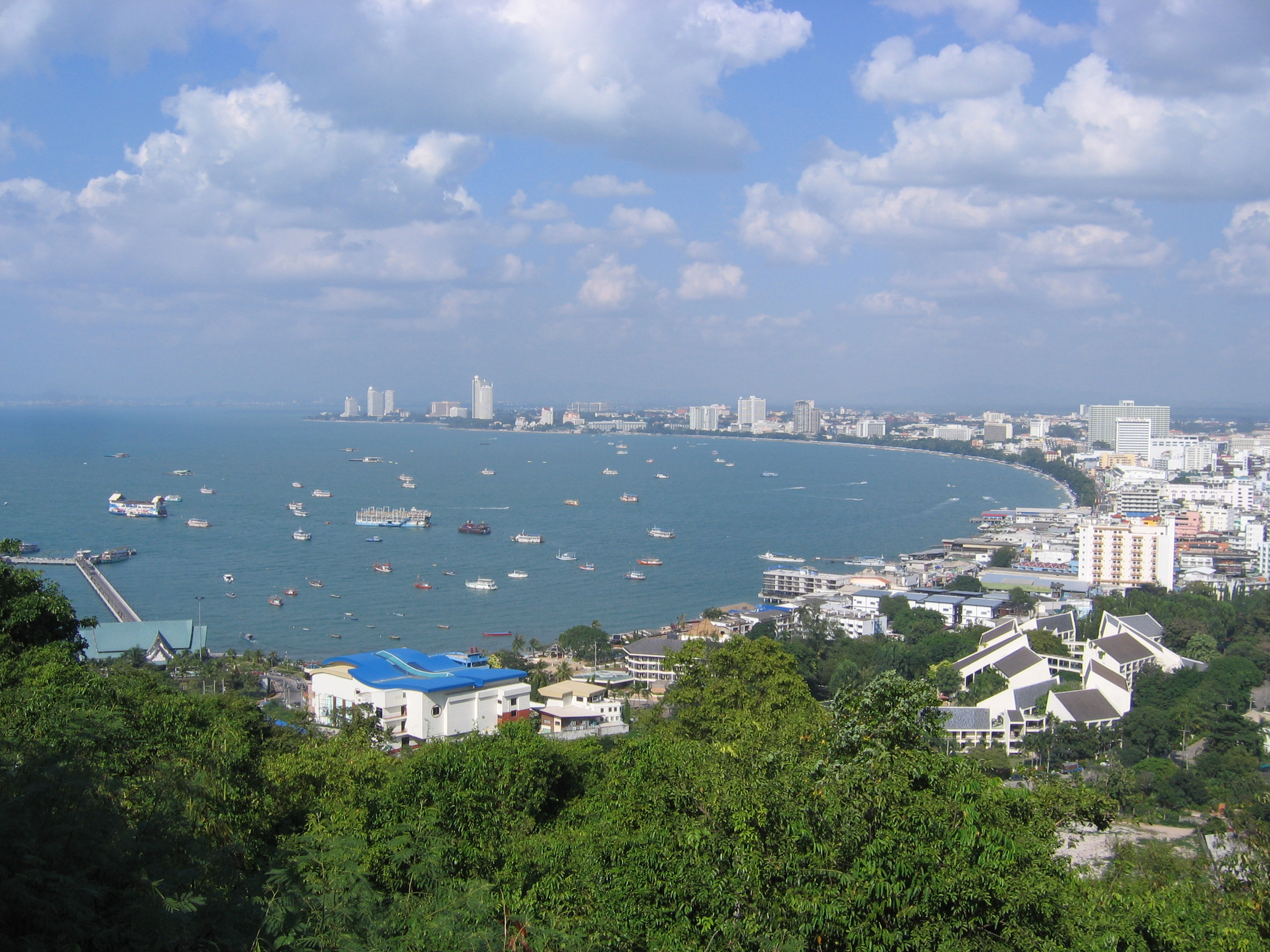
The coastal city of Pattaya was visited during this leg.

Airdates: 11, 12 & 18 January 2012

- Bangkok (Wat Pho Ferry Pier to Wat Arun Ferry Pier)
- Bangkok (Wat Arun)
- Bangkok (Wat Arun to Guan Yu Shrine – Karaoke Taxi Station)
- Pattaya (Pattaya Beach)
- Pattaya (Manita Boutique Hotel) (Overnight Rest)
- Pattaya (Ban Amphur)
- Pattaya (Nong Nooch Tropical Botanical Garden)
- Pattaya (Pattaya Beach)
- Pattaya (Pattaya Park Tower)
- Pattaya (Bali Hai)

For this season's final Duel, teams had to walk around a course on shoes made out of coconut shells while collecting coconuts and placing them into baskets on their backs. If they dropped any coconuts along the way, or if their feet touched the sand, they had to start over. The first team to collect ten coconuts, five for each team member, would receive their next clue while the team that lost had to wait for the next team. The team that lost the final Duel had to wait out a 15-minute penalty.

This leg's Detour was a choice between שקשק אותו (Sheqsheq Aotov – Slosh It) or פוצץ אותו (Potzetz Aotov – Pop It). In Slosh It, teams tasted a fresh-fruit smoothie and had to identify the fruits from which it was made. They then had to collect large styrofoam fruits scattered on the beach while hopping in a potato sack. If they brought back all of the fruits that had been used in the smoothie, they would get their next clue. In Pop It, teams participated in a traditional activity meant to scare off evil spirits. One team member put on a blindfold and entered a pool filled with balloons. Their partner would pick a color and had to verbally direct the blindfolded member in order to pop all of the balloons of the same color to receive their next clue.

In this leg's Roadblock, the chosen team member had to wear a white T-shirt and lie on the ground while an elephant put his leg on their body and hit them with its trunk. The team member then had to put a flat wooden pallet under the T-shirt and let the elephant paint on the T-shirt. When the painting was complete, the elephant would give teams their next clue.

Additional tasks

- At Wat Arun, the teams had to eat locally made popsicles until they found the one popsicle stick out of a hundred with the words "Karaoke Cabs" printed on it. When found, teams would receive their next clue. They would then vote for the team they wished to U-Turn.
- At the Karaoke Taxi Station, the teams had to choose a taxi and would be joined by a ladyboy. While riding in the taxi, they had to sing a karaoke version of Izhar Cohen's "Olé, Olé" on repeat for the entire two-hour trip. If they stopped singing, the taxi would pull over and stop until they started singing again
- At Pattaya Beach, teams competed in a limbo contest to determine their departure time. For after each successful attempt the pole was lowered. Each time both team members passed under the pole without falling or touching it, they received an earlier departure time the next day. If they fell or knocked over the bar even once, though, they would be forced to accept the departure time they had achieved and could not try again.
- During the overnight rest after the limbo task, teams received video messages from their loved ones at home.
- After the Roadblock, one team member had to walk on Pattaya Beach with fruits and attempt to obtain phone numbers from three people of the opposite gender to receive their next clue. They would give one fruit to any person from whom they got a phone number. The second team member would be watching from a distance and would be communicating with them through an earpiece, directing them to say pickup lines from a list.
- At Pattaya Park Tower, teams rode a zip line elevator from the tower's roof and had to look for name of the next Pit Stop, which was written in large letters on a parking lot nearby.

Additional note

- Teams had to travel to Wat Arun by ferry and to the karaoke taxi station by a long-tail boat.

=== Leg 10 (Thailand → Sri Lanka) ===
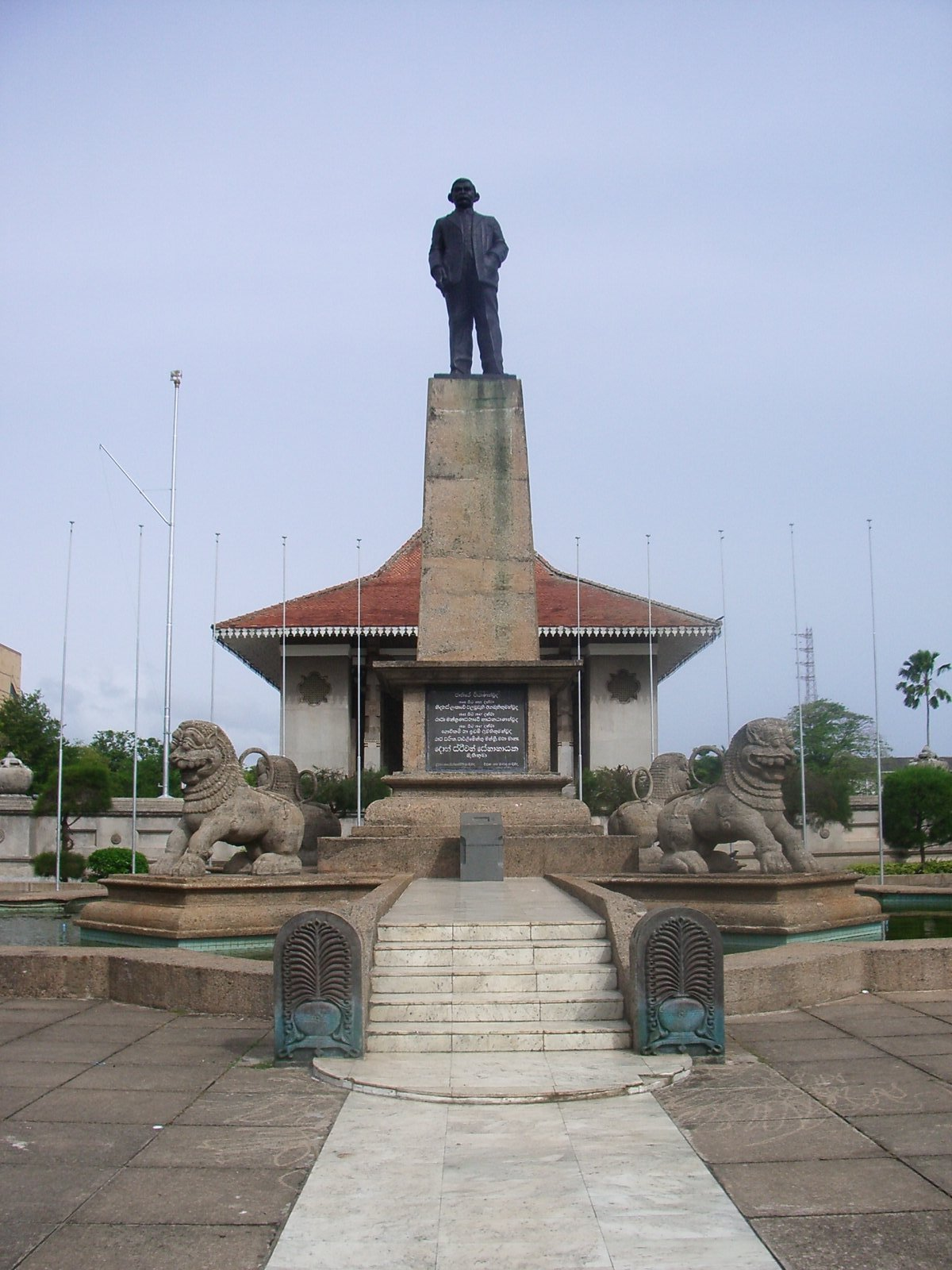
Colombo's Independence Memorial Hall was the Pit Stop for this leg.

Airdates: 25 & 26 January 2012

- Bangkok (Suvarnabhumi Airport) to Colombo, Sri Lanka (Bandaranaike International Airport)
- Colombo (Susu Darame Temple)
- Colombo (Gangaramaya Temple)
- Sri Jayawardenepura Kotte (Jana Kala Kendraya)
- Colombo (Groceries Corner & Snack Bar)
- Colombo (Kollupitiya Market or Laundry Depot)
  - Colombo (MrPierce Studios International)
- Colombo (Sunil Cowshed)
- Colombo (Viharamahadevi Park)
- Colombo (Sri Lanka Central Mail Exchange)
- Colombo (Independence Memorial Hall)

This leg's Detour was a choice between סבלי תבלינים (Sebley Tebleyneym – Spice Porters) or כובסי כביסה (Khovesy Khvitah – Laundry Washers). In Spice Porters, each team member had to pack 25 kilograms (55 lb) of chili peppers into a sack. They then had to carry them to the mashing stand and mash them into 300 grams (0.66 lb) of paste to receive their next clue. In Laundry Washers, teams had to follow traditional methods and wash 50 sheets, three of which contained Hebrew words. Once all three words had been discovered, teams had to hang all of the sheets they had cleaned and then show the words to a judge to receive their next clue. Each Detour choice had only three workstations.

In this season's second Fast Forward, both members from one team had to get a permanent tattoo of a half-heart design to win the Fast Forward award.

In this season's final Roadblock, one team member had to search among 7,000 letters for one addressed to their team. After finding it, teams could read the letter inside, watch a video message from loved ones, and would find items from home, before receiving their next clue.

Additional tasks

- At Susu Darame Temple, teams had to find a needle in a haystack and use it to sew Buddhist emblems on white robes. They then have to wear the robes and travel by taxi to the Gangaramaya Temple for a blessing from a monk to receive their next clue.
- At Jana Kala Kendraya, each team member had to spin a large wheel containing pictures of Sri Lankan masks. When the wheel stopped on one of the masks, the team member would only have three seconds to memorize it and then had to find the mask in the crowd of masked revelers. Once both team members were successful, they were directed to their next clue. However, their next clue was located in a basket underneath a cobra. One team member would play a flute to distract it while the other used large pliers to grab the clue.
- Teams that did not attempt the Fast Forward had to travel by tuk-tuk to Sunil Cowshed, where they would collect cow dung until they filled two baskets and carry them on their heads to a drying area. They then had to mix in water and sawdust, make 100 fuel patties, and stick all 100 to a wall to receive their next clue.
- At Viharamahadevi Park, one team member would be presented with a Sri Lankan flag, who would then have to verbally describe the flag to their partner. That team member had to correctly draw the flag based on the description given to receive their next clue. This task was not aired.

=== Leg 11 (Sri Lanka) ===
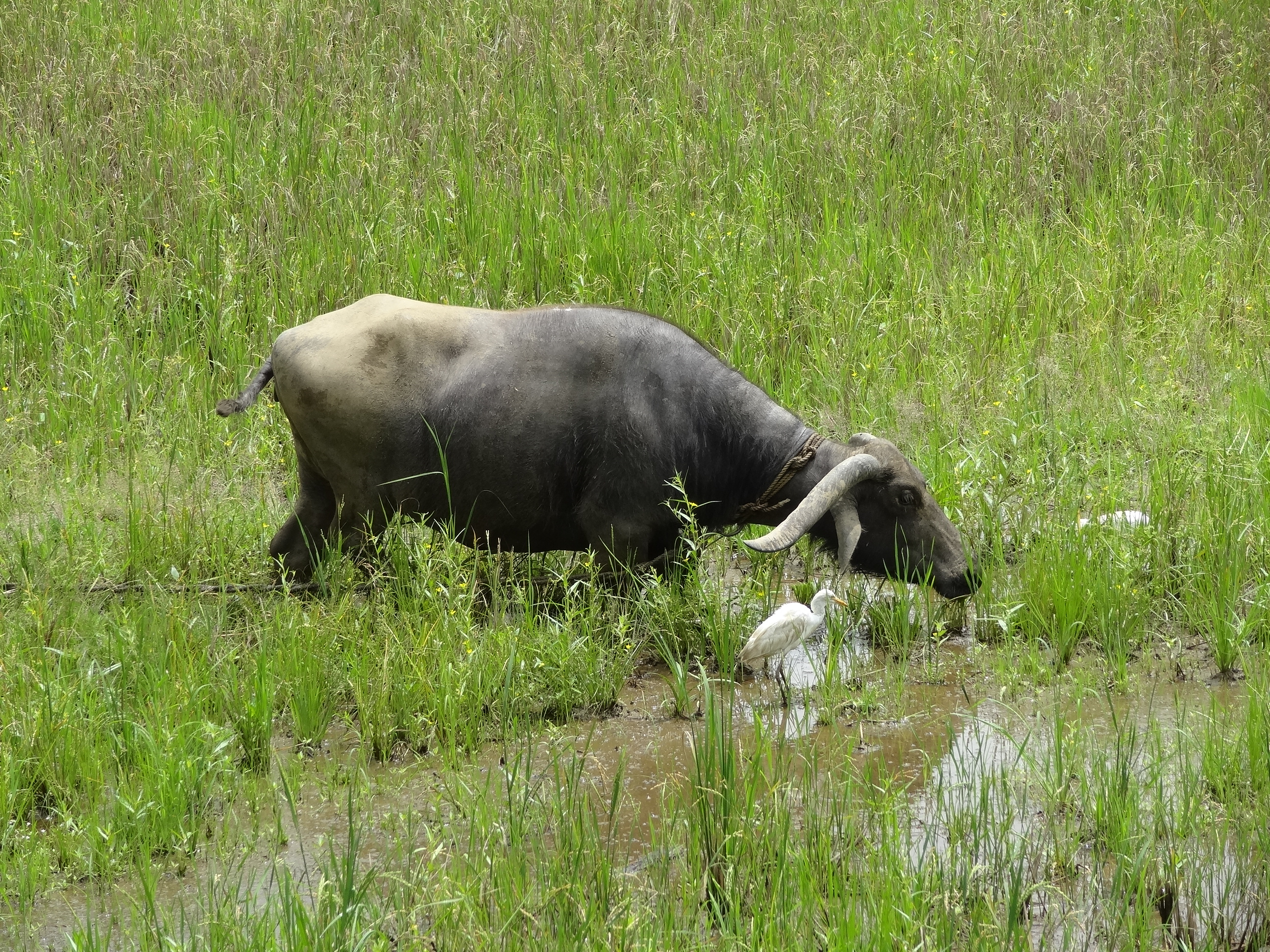
The Detour had teams getting involved with water buffalos.

- Episode 27 (2 February 2012)
- Prize: A prepaid credit card with a large sum of money (awarded to Akiva & Anaelle)

Locations

- Balapitiya (Sri Pushparama Vihara)
- Southern Province (Coconut Plantation)
- Panadura (Gangula Devalaya)
- Panadura → Colombo (Galle Face Green)

Episode summary

- This season's final Detour was a choice between Male (זכר – Zechar) or Female (נקבה – Neqebah). For both tasks, team members could only use their right hand. In Male, teams had to attach a cart to a water buffalo and load the cart with coconuts. They then had to lead the cart along a marked course without dropping any coconuts before receiving their next clue. In Female, teams had to milk a female buffalo until they filled a cup before receiving their next clue.
- After the Detour, teams had to travel to Gangula Devalaya in Panadura. There, one team member had to walk barefoot over hot coals, while the other team member had to lie on a bed of nails for three minutes before receiving their next clue. Teams then had to travel by bus to Colombo and check in at the Pit Stop: the Galle Face Green.

Additional note

- After this leg concluded, teams returned to Israel.

=== Leg 12 (Singapore) ===
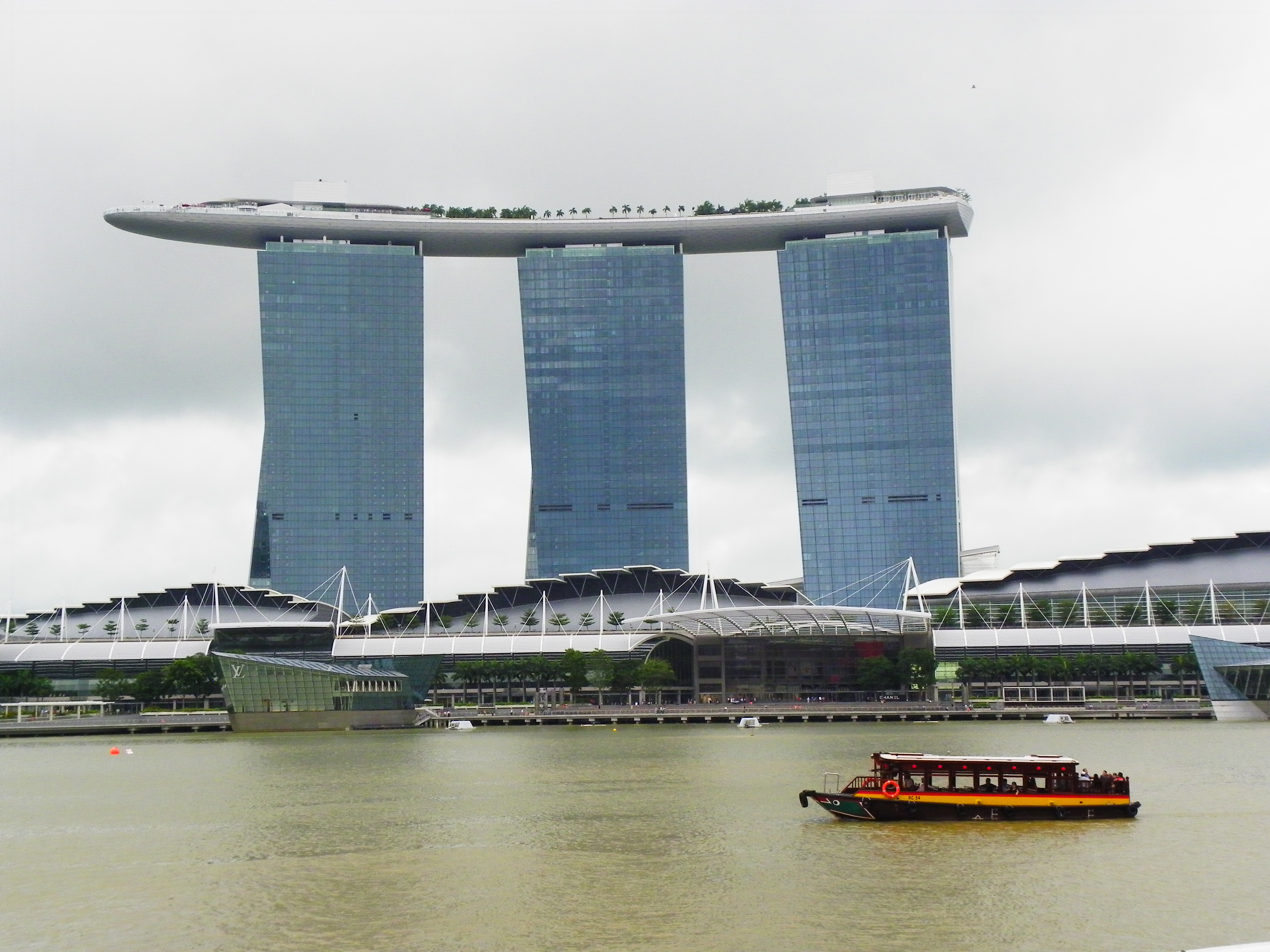
Teams visited Marina Bay Sands for the last two legs.

- Episode 28 (9 February 2012)

Locations

- Singapore (Changi Airport)
- Singapore (Orchard Road)
- Singapore (Suntec City – Fountain of Wealth)
  - Singapore (Flight Experience Singapore)
- Singapore (Marina Bay Sands)
- Singapore (ArtScience Museum)
- Singapore (Marina Bay Sands – Skypark)

Episode summary

- Months later, after the season premiered, teams flew to Singapore for the final two legs. At the start of this leg, teams had to drive to Orchard Road in a sport car containing a suitcase holding ₪1,000,000 in cash. There, teams had to put on high heels and carry the cash from the suitcase through a marked course, which included crossing busy intersections and walking through busy malls and up escalators. When teams arrived at the Fountain of Wealth with the money, they had to circle the fountain three times and touch the water before receiving their next clue.
- For their Speed Bump, Tom & Adel entered a flight simulator of a Boeing 737 and had to complete the takeoff, regular and emergency announcements, and landing. After succeeding in at least three of the four criteria, they could continue racing.
- Teams had to travel to Marina Bay Sands and perform an escape illusion, where one team member had to unlock themselves from handcuffs and out of a sack within a box while their partner spun the box and open it from a certain angle showing it to be 'empty', in front of an audience before receiving their next clue from local illusionists J C Sum and "Magic Babe" Ning Cai.
- Teams then had to travel to the ArtScience Museum. There, one team member was blindfolded and wore a helmet with a small video camera and a bluetooth headset. They were lowered from the roof down to the ground on a wire and had to grab 15 merlion statuettes attached to a hanging rope suspended from the museum roof, five of each of three colors, with their partner watching the video feed from their helmet and directing them.
- After receiving their next clue, teams had to travel to the Skypark atop Marina Bay Sands and swim across the infinity pool before they could check in at the Pit Stop.

=== Leg 13 (Singapore) ===
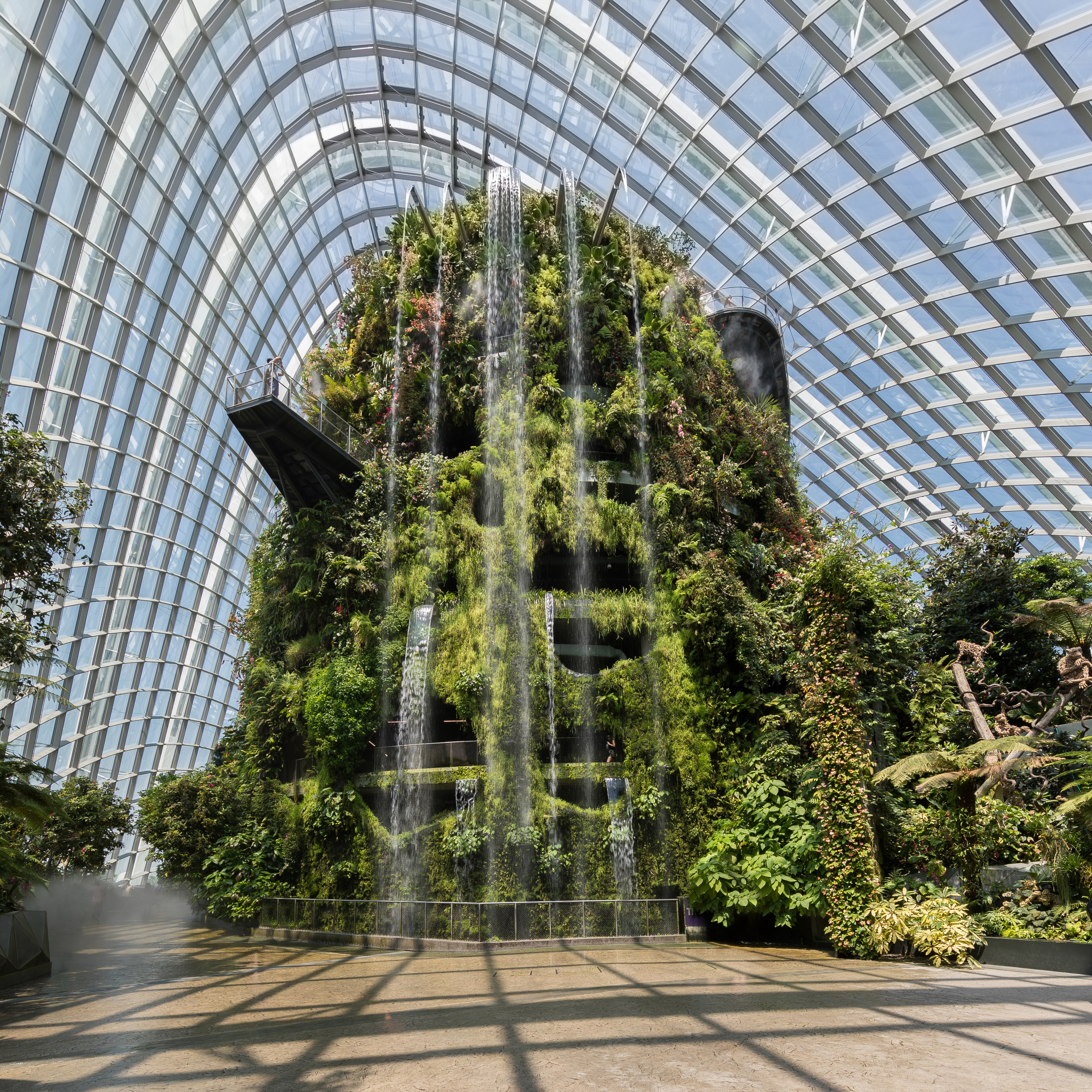
Inside Gardens by the Bay within Downtown Singapore, teams crossed the Finish Line for HaMerotz LaMillion 2.

- Episode 29 (11 February 2012)
- First place prize: ₪1,000,000 (awarded to Bar & Inna)
- Second place prize: Two scooters (awarded to Alon & Oren)
- Third place prize: A holiday abroad (awarded to Akiva & Anaelle)

Locations

- Singapore (Marina Bay Sands – Skypark)
- Singapore (Helix Bridge → Clemenceau Jetty)
- Singapore (Hong San See Temple)
- Singapore (Singapore Flyer)
- Singapore (The Shoppes at Marina Bay Sands)
- Singapore (Marina Bay Sands – 55th Floor)
- Singapore (Gardens by the Bay)

Episode summary

- At the start of this leg, teams traveled by bumboat along the Singapore River before receiving their next clue directing them to the Hong San See Temple. There, one team member had to extinguish a burning pole by engulfing it in their mouth, and the second member had to breathe fire on a piece of paper so that burned up and revealed their next clue.
- Teams had to travel to the Singapore Flyer and enter one of the cabins with a large array of items. Teams had to figure out that they had to use an ultraviolet light to see invisible writing on one of the items that said 'take me', which was written on a megaphone. They also had to notice a QR code attached to a chair that would present the message of 'take me' if scanned by the tablet. Once teams presented both items, they received their next clue. Teams then had to bring these items to The Shoppes at Marina Bay Sands and use the megaphone to convince 58 people to sit on the chair at once before receiving their next clue.
- Lastly, teams had to travel to the 55th floor of Marina Bay Sands. There, each team member had to step onto a separate tightrope spanning the space between two of the resort's towers with team members' only form of support would be holding each other up while they crossed the gap. On the other side, teams received an orchid and had to return to the starting point before receiving their final clue, which directed them to the finish line: Gardens by the Bay. If teams fell off at any point, they had to begin the whole task again.

== Ratings ==
The second season had a 30.8% average Jewish household rating across the season. The finale received ratings of 42% Jewish household share with 1.4 million viewers watching the episode.
