= Charles Bridge =

Medieval stone arch bridge across the Vltava river in Prague, Czechia

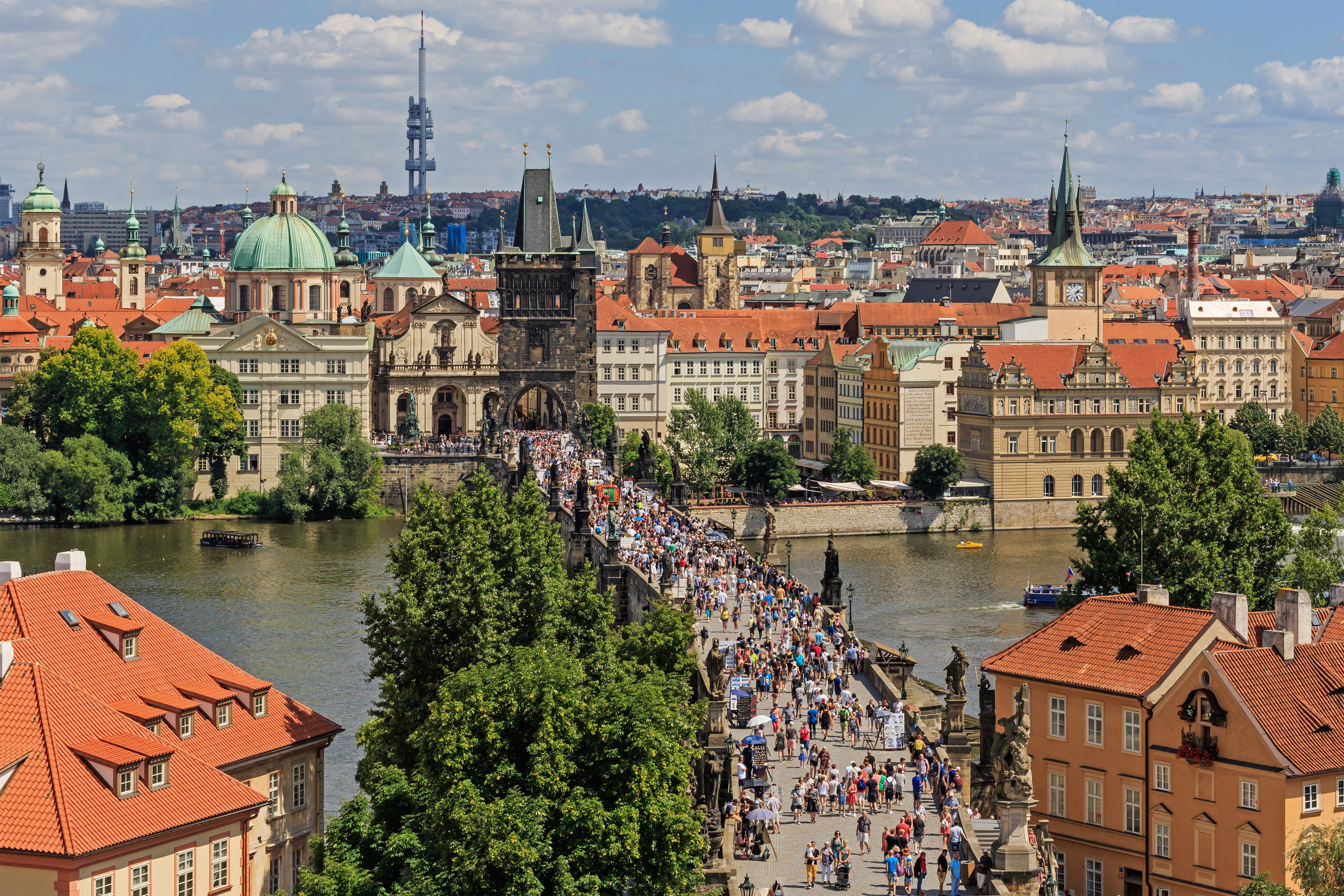
- View of the bridge, 2016
- Coordinates: 50°05′11″N 14°24′43″E
- Carries: Pedestrian only
- Crosses: Vltava River
- Locale: Prague
- Official name: Karlův most
- Other name(s): Stone Bridge (Kamenný most), Prague Bridge (Pražský most)

Characteristics
- Design: Stone
- Material: Bohemian sandstone
- Total length: 515.8 metres (1,692 ft)
- Width: 9.5 metres (31 ft)
- Longest span: 13.4 metres (44 ft)
- No. of spans: 16
- Clearance below: 13 metres (43 ft)

History
- Designer: Peter Parler
- Construction start: 1357
- Construction end: 1402 (45 years)

Location
- Interactive map of Charles Bridge

Charles Bridge (Czech: Karlův most [ˈkarluːf ˈmost], German: Karlsbrücke [kaʁlsˌbʁʏkə]) is a medieval stone arch bridge that crosses the Vltava river in Prague, Czech Republic. Its construction started in 1357 under the auspices of King Charles IV, and finished in the early 15th century. The bridge replaced the old Judith Bridge built 1158–1172 that had been severely damaged by a flood in 1342. This new bridge was originally called Stone Bridge (Kamenný most) or Prague Bridge (Pražský most), but has been referred to as "Charles Bridge" since 1870.

As the only means of crossing the river Vltava until 1841, Charles Bridge was the most important connection between Prague Castle and the city's Old Town and adjacent areas. This land connection made Prague important as a trade route between Eastern and Western Europe. The bridge is located on the historic coronation route of the Bohemian kings.

The bridge is 516 metres (1,693 ft) long and nearly 10 metres (33 ft) wide. Following the example of the Stone Bridge in Regensburg, it was built as a bow bridge with 16 arches shielded by ice guards. It is protected by three bridge towers, two on the Lesser Quarter side (including the Malá Strana Bridge Tower) and one on the Old Town side, the Old Town Bridge Tower. The bridge is decorated by a continuous alley of 30 statues and statuaries, most of them baroque-style, originally erected around 1700, but now all have been replaced by replicas.

The bridge is currently undergoing a twenty-year process of structural inspections, restoration, and repairs. The process started in late 2019, and is expected to cost 45–60 million CZK (US$1.9–2.6 million).

== History ==
=== 14th to 19th centuries ===
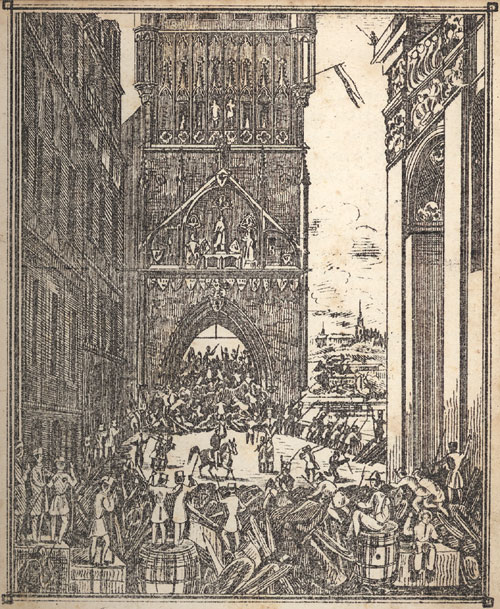
Old Town Bridge Tower during 1848 revolution

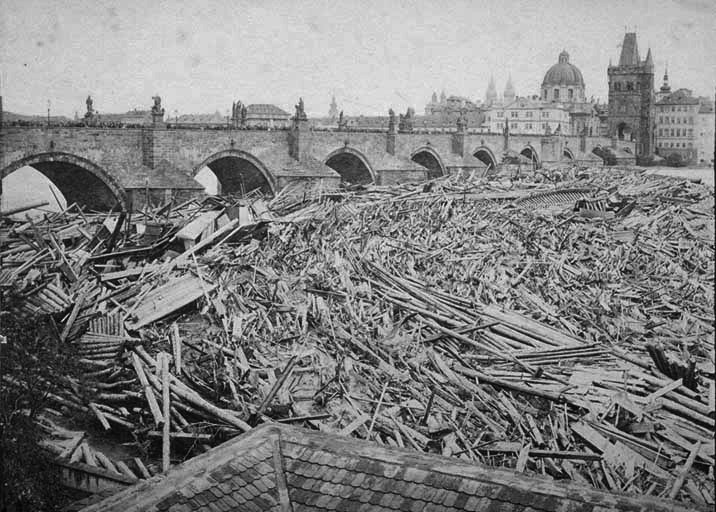
Charles Bridge during 1872 flood

Throughout its history, Charles Bridge has suffered several disasters and witnessed many historic events. Czech legend has it that construction began on Charles Bridge at 5:31am on 9 July 1357 with the first stone being laid by Charles IV himself. This exact time was very important to the Holy Roman Emperor because he was a strong believer in numerology and felt that this specific time, which formed a palindrome (1357 9/7 5:31), was a numerical bridge, and would imbue Charles Bridge with additional strength. The bridge was completed 45 years later in 1402. A flood in 1432 damaged three pillars. In 1496 the third arch (counting from the Old Town side) broke down after one of the pillars lowered, being undermined by the water (repairs were finished in 1503). A year after the Battle of White Mountain, when the 27 leaders of the anti-Habsburg revolt were executed on 21 June 1621, the Old Town Bridge Tower served as a deterrent display of the severed heads of the victims to stop Czechs from further resistance. During the end of the Thirty Years' War in 1648, the Swedes occupied the west bank of the Vltava, and as they tried to advance into the Old Town the heaviest fighting took place right on the bridge. During the fighting, they severely damaged one side of the Old Town bridge tower (the side facing the river) and the remnants of almost all gothic decorations had to be removed from it afterward. During the late 17th century and early 18th century the bridge gained its typical appearance when an alley of baroque statues was installed on the pillars. During a great flood in 1784, five pillars were severely damaged and, although the arches did not break down, the traffic on the bridge had to be greatly restricted for some time.

The original stairway to Kampa Island was replaced by a new one in 1844. The next year, another great flood threatened the bridge, but the bridge escaped major damage. In 1848, during the revolutionary days, the bridge escaped unharmed from the cannonade, but some of the statues were damaged. In 1866, pseudo-gothic gas lights were erected on the balustrade; they were later replaced with electric lighting. In the 1870s, the first regular public-transport (omnibus) line went over the bridge (officially called "Charles Bridge" after 1870) later replaced by a horse tram. The bridge towers underwent a thorough reconstruction between 1874 and 1883.

On 2–5 September 1890, another disastrous flood struck Prague and severely damaged Charles Bridge. Thousands of rafts, logs and other floating materials that escaped from places upstream gradually formed a huge barrier leaning against the bridge. Three arches were torn down by the great pressure and two pillars collapsed from being undermined by the water, while others were partly damaged. With the fifth pillar, two statues – St. Ignatius of Loyola and St. Xavier, both by Ferdinand Brokoff – also fell into the river. The former statue was replaced by a statuary of Saints Cyril and Methodius by Karel Dvořák; the latter was replaced by a replica of the original. Repair works lasted for two years (the bridge was reopened on 19 November 1892) and cost 665,000 crowns.

=== 20th century to present ===
The bridge between 1900 and 1916

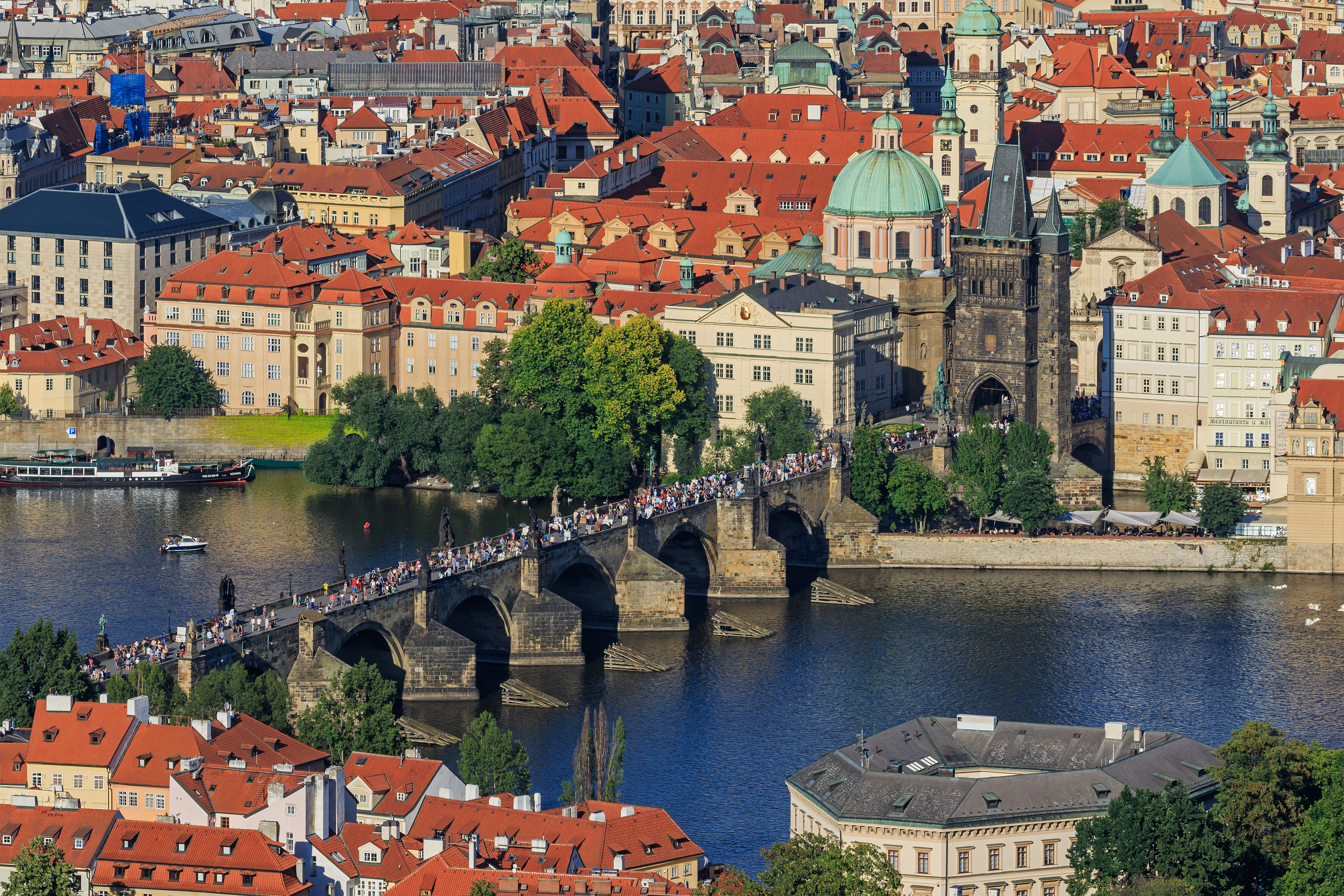
Charles Bridge as viewed from Petřínská rozhledna – lookout tower

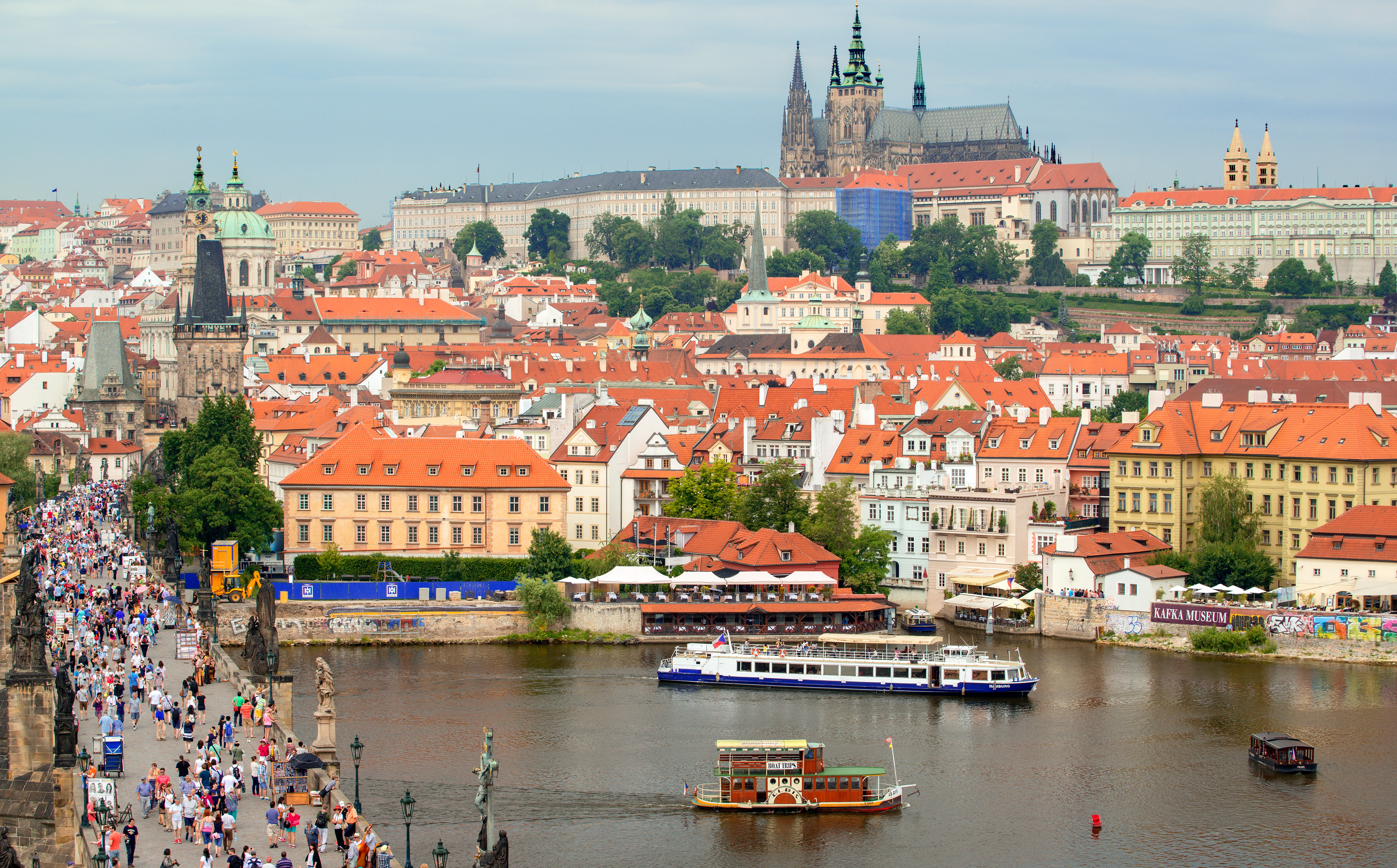
View towards the Prague Castle with Charles Bridge

In the beginning of the 20th century, Charles Bridge saw a steep rise of heavy traffic. The last day of the horse line on the bridge was 15 May 1905, when it was replaced with an electric tram and later, in 1908, with buses. At the end of World War II, a barricade was built in the Old Town bridge tower gateway. A capital repair of the bridge took place between 1965 and 1978, based on a collaboration among various scientific and cultural institutes. The stability of the pillars was reassured, all broken stone blocks were replaced, and the asphalt top was removed. All vehicular traffic has been excluded from Charles Bridge since then, making it accessible by pedestrians only. The repair cost 50 million crowns.

During the 1990s, some people started criticizing the previous reconstruction of the bridge and proposing further work. As of the beginning of the new millennium, most of the experts appeared to agree that the previous reconstruction had not been flawless but disputed the need for further interference with the bridge. However, after the disastrous floods of 2002 (which themselves caused only minor harm to the bridge), support for an overall bridge reconstruction grew. It was decided that repair and stabilization of the two pillars (numbers 8 and 9) on the Malá Strana side of the bridge would be done. These are the only river pillars that were not repaired after the 1890 floods. The reconstruction was a gradual process that closed off parts of the bridge without closing the span entirely.

Performed from 2008 to 2010, the work included bolstering the pillars and building a new hydroisolation system protecting the bridge. It also encompassed a re-pavimentation of the bridge's pavement and the replacement of many of the stones in the bridge walls, a matter which was controversial due to a heavy-handed approach adopted by the restoration team, which had no previous experience in restoration of cultural heritage monuments. The result has been criticised by conservation professionals all over Europe (see photos on external links), as dozens of new replacement stones do not match the historical ones they are next to, the amount of replaced stones is considered excessive, some stones have been inappropriately positioned, original stones have been chipped and joining materials employed are considered not appropriate for the structure. In 2010 UNESCO's World Heritage Committee adopted a decision stating that "the restoration of Charles Bridge was carried out without adequate conservation advice on materials and techniques".

== Statues on the bridge ==
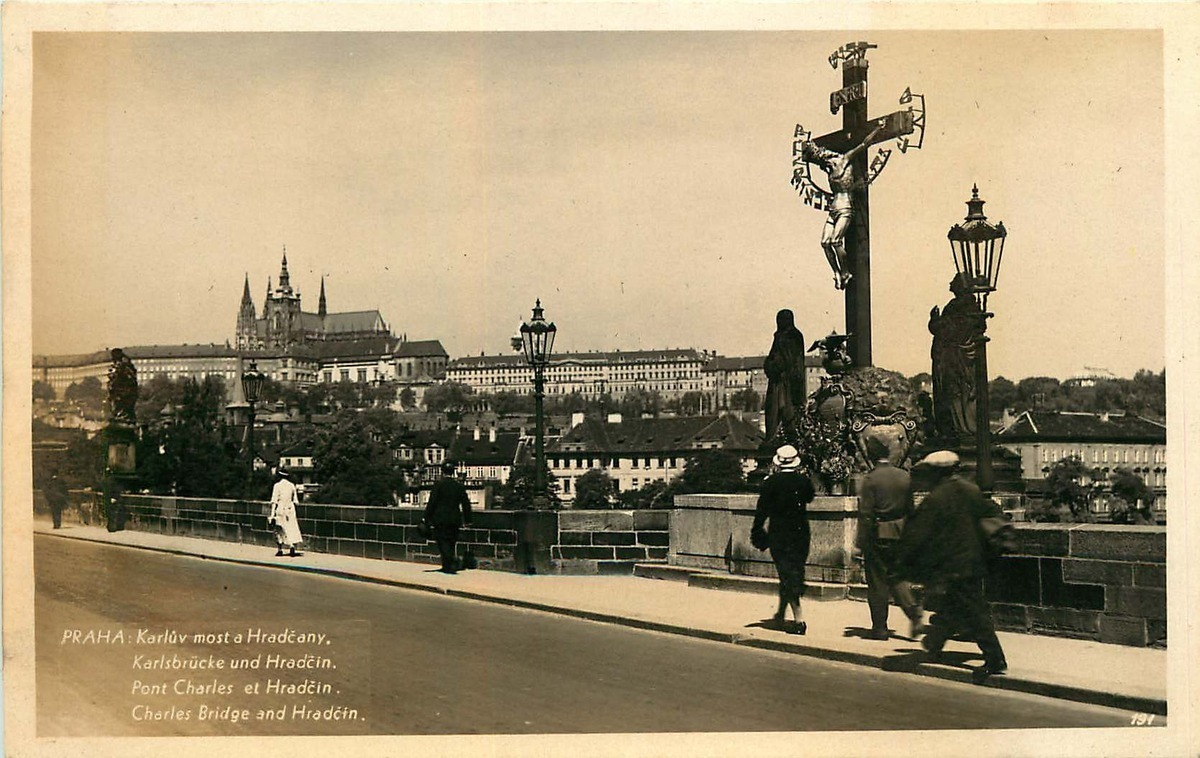
Charles Bridge and the Calvary, c. 1935

The avenue of 30 mostly Baroque statues and statuaries situated on the balustrade forms a unique connection of artistic styles with the underlying Gothic bridge. Most sculptures were erected between 1683 and 1714. They depict various saints and patron saints venerated at that time. The most prominent Bohemian sculptors of the time took part in decorating the bridge, such as Matthias Braun, Jan Brokoff, and his sons Michael Joseph and Ferdinand Maxmilian.

Among the most notable sculptures, one can find the statuaries of St. Luthgard, the Holy Crucifix and Calvary, and John of Nepomuk. Well known also is the statue of the knight Bruncvík, although it was erected some 200 years later and does not belong to the main avenue.

Beginning in 1965, all of the statues have been systematically replaced by replicas, and the originals have been exhibited in the Lapidarium of the National Museum.

== Vandalism ==
According to an article from December 2018, the entire Charles Bridge is monitored by sixteen cameras, twelve of which are aimed at selected statues, while four cover the monument from multiple directions. An electronic perimeter-detection system alerts the regional police directorate and the municipal police operations center whenever a breach is detected. At least one security guard is always on patrol on the bridge, and municipal police officers periodically inspect it, also monitoring for beggars and other disruptive individuals.

Supervision of the bridge is the responsibility of the Association of Charles Bridge Artists (Sdružení výtvarníků Karlova mostu), which leases the bridge. However, Roman Kotrč of the association expressed doubts about the effectiveness of the camera system given the incidents occurring there. For example, when police were asked to review footage to identify who had damaged the crozier of Saint Adalbert, they reportedly told the bridge’s tenants: “Mr. Kotrč, we’ll have to call the Vatican. A miracle has happened—there’s nothing on the cameras.”

Statues on the bridge have occasionally been damaged. On November 3, 1918, a crowd led by activists from Prague’s Žižkov district destroyed the Marian Column in Prague’s Old Town Square. According to accounts, the crowd then intended to proceed to Charles Bridge and throw its statues into the Vltava River. Legend has it that a man shouted, “Take down the statues from Charles Bridge as well!” The crowd was especially hostile toward the statue of Saint John of Nepomuk. Soldiers prevented the attack by closing and guarding the bridge until November 6, 1918.

The following day, November 4, 1918, the National Committee issued a proclamation lamenting the destruction of a monument that had been among the finest examples of Baroque art and calling for an end to further destruction of monuments regardless of their historical associations.

Crowds again threatened the statue of Saint John of Nepomuk during his feast day celebrations in May 1919. In response, the People’s Party adopted a resolution opposing proposals to remove the statue.

In 2018, someone broke off an arm from the original sculptural group of Saints Cyril and Methodius. Part of Saint Adalbert’s crozier was also broken off, and other damage included a halo and an eagle holding a cartouche. The Slavic maiden in the Cyril and Methodius group had her leg broken numerous times. In one case, a vandal was caught striking it with a hammer, apparently for “religious” reasons. More recently, another arm was torn off from the same sculpture, which, according to a supervising artist, may have been taken home as a souvenir.

In the sculpture group featuring a Turk, someone broke off the arms of a suffering Christian figure hidden behind a grille in a cave. The Turk’s sabre has reportedly been stolen about twenty times. An attempt to steal the sceptre and crown from the same statue was unsuccessful. Nevertheless, by the end of 2018, Prague city authorities and the municipal police stated that they had no information indicating an increase in vandal attacks.

The bridge railing is occasionally covered with graffiti, and liners from trash bins are sometimes thrown into the Vltava River. In September 2017, a 48-year-old foreign national wrote on a statue of Saint Francis of Assisi with a marker. He received a six-month suspended sentence, a three-year expulsion order, and was required to pay 15,000 Czech koruna in damages.

Repairs to damaged statues often take months. Before restoration can begin, a conservation report must be prepared and pass through an extensive approval process in which both the restoration method and the sculptor must be approved. According to Kotrč, the sculptures are administered by the National Heritage Institute, which requires an opinion for the Prague City Gallery, the institution responsible for managing the statues.

== Tribute ==
On 9 July 2017, Google celebrated the 660th anniversary of Charles Bridge with a Google Doodle.

== See also ==
- Ponte Milvio
- Most Ljubavi
