= Statue of Bruncvík, Charles Bridge =

Statue in Prague, Czech Republic

Statue of Bruncvík
- Socha Bruncvíka (Czech)
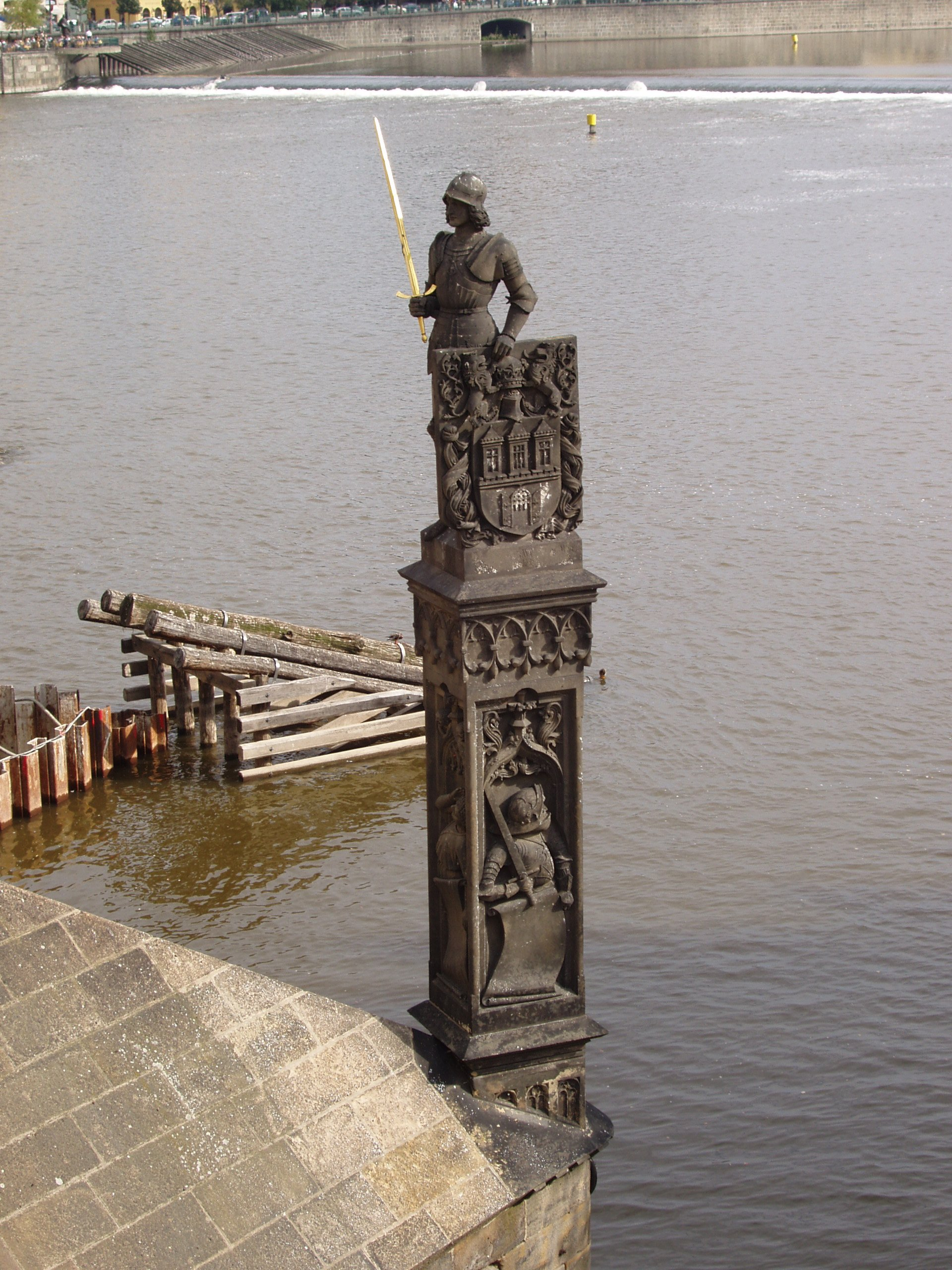
- The statue in 2005
- Artist: Ludvík Šimek
- Type: Sculpture
- Subject: Bruncvík
- Location: Prague, Czech Republic; 50°05′12″N 14°24′34″E

The statue of Bruncvík (Czech: Socha Bruncvíka) is an outdoor sculpture by Ludvík Šimek in 1884, installed on the south side of the Charles Bridge in Prague, Czech Republic.
