= Calvary, Charles Bridge =

Sculpture in Prague, Czech Republic

Calvary
- Sousoší Kalvárie (Czech)
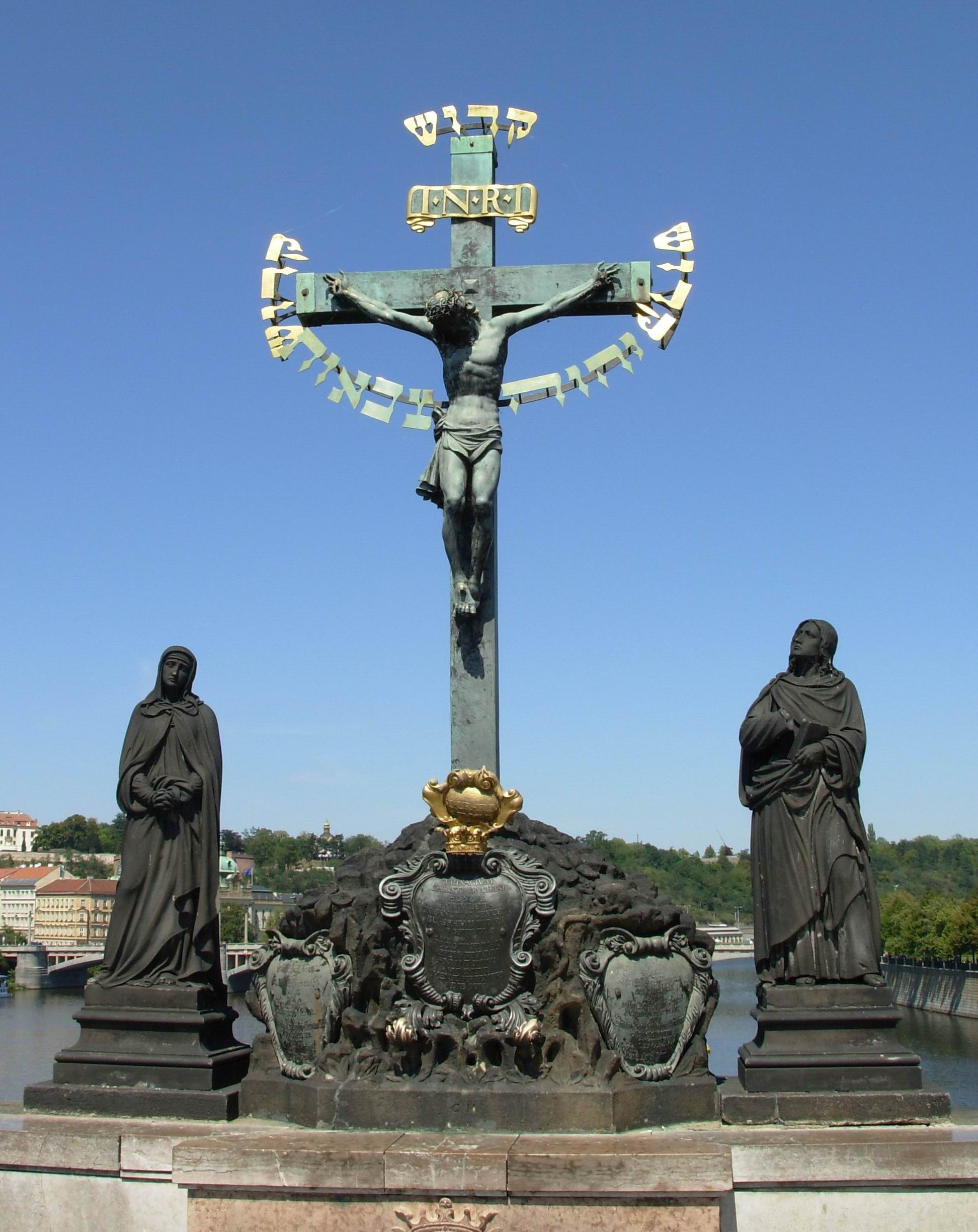
- The sculpture in 2007
- Artist: Hans Hillger after Wolf Ernst Brohn Emanuel Max
- Type: Sculpture
- Medium: bronze, marmor
- Subject: Jesus
- Location: Prague, Czech Republic; 50.0864°N 14.4124°E

Calvary (Czech: Sousoší Kalvárie) is an outdoor sculpture, installed on the third pillar of the north side of the Charles Bridge in Prague, Czech Republic.

== History ==
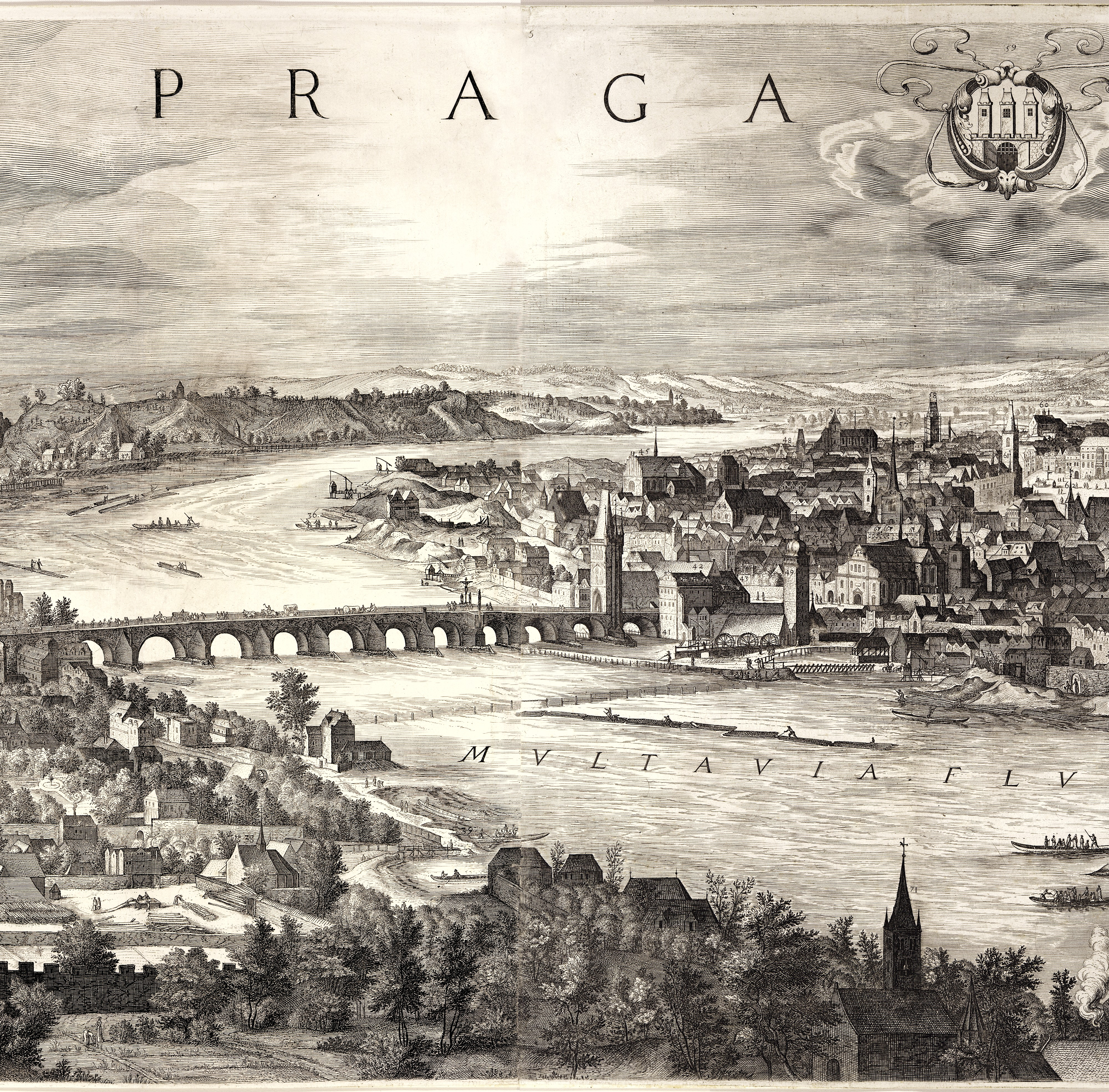
Aegidius Sadeler, View of the City Prague (one part with the Calvary on the Charles bridge (1606

The first cross was standing on the Charles bridge since the 14th century, documented by chronicles of the Roman emperor Charles IV and in 1606 by Aegidius Sadeler's Prospect od Prague.

The main statue of the Jesus on the cross was cast in bronze by Hans Hillger in Dresden after the model made by sculptor Wolf Ernst Brohn in 1628, in an early baroque style. The statue was set on the Charles bridge only in 1657.

Calvary hill was made of stone by the sculptor Johann Georg Heermann in 1707.

Both side statues of Virgin Mary and Saint John were added by Emanuel Max in 1861.

The sculpture features a crucifix surrounded by the Hebrew words קדוש קדוש קדוש יהוה צבאות (English: Holy, Holy, Holy is Jehovah of hosts) from Isaiah 6:3. In 1696, a Jewish communal leader named Elias Backoffen was forced to pay for the inscription after being accused of blasphemy. The aleph in the word "Tzva’ot" is backwards, as the letter was removed by the Nazis during the occupation of Czechoslovakia, and later mistakenly placed after the war. In 2009, explanatory plaques were added in English, Czech and Hebrew after the Mayor of Prague was petitioned by a group of North American rabbis.
