= Malá Strana Bridge Tower =

- Malostranská mostecká věž
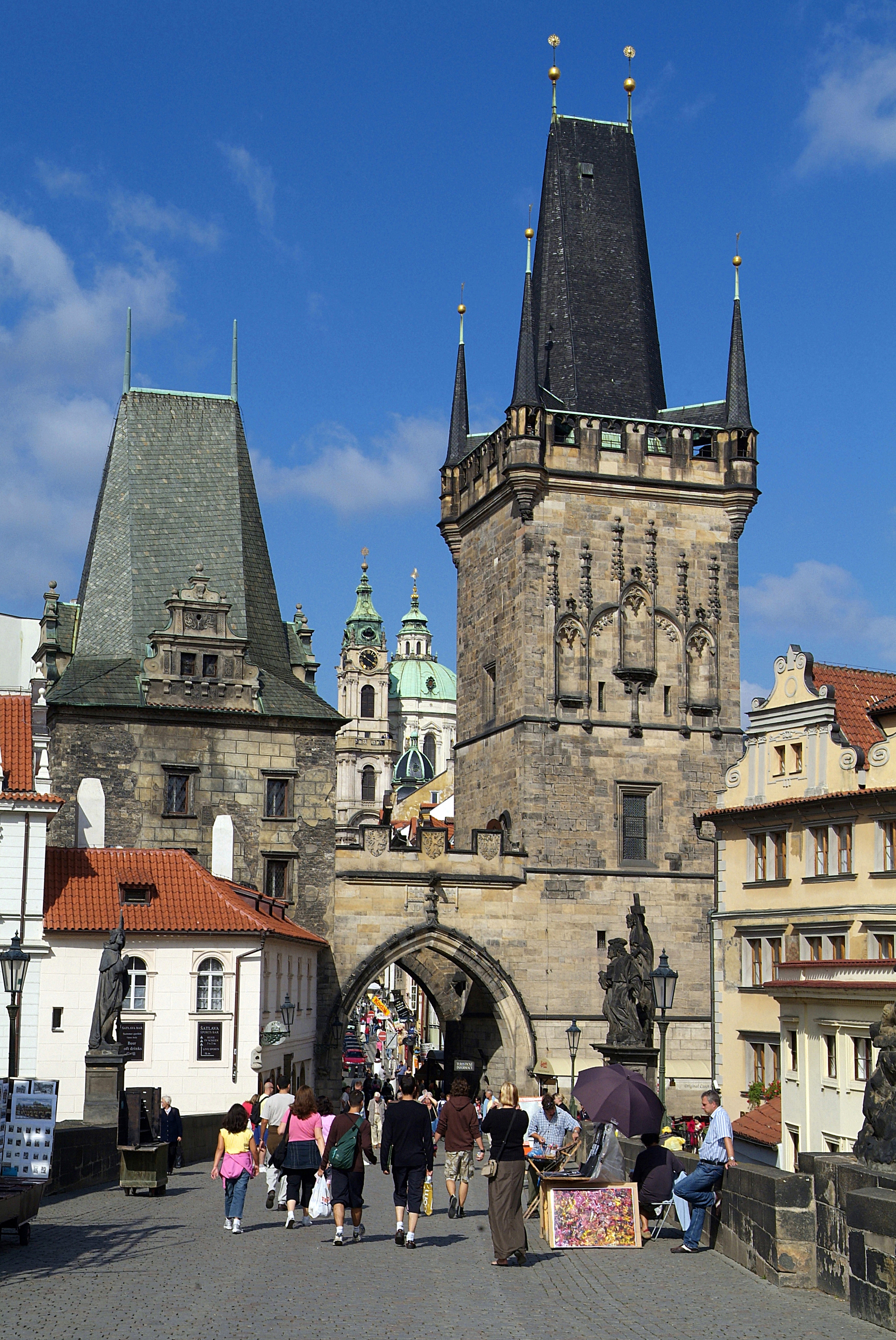
- The tower in 2008

- Location within Czech Republic

General information
- Type: Tower
- Location: Prague, Czech Republic
- Coordinates: 50°5′14″N 14°24′26″E

The Malá Strana Bridge Tower (Czech: Malostranská mostecká věž) is located in Prague, Czech Republic. The tower serves as the entrance to Malá Strana from the Charles Bridge.

== See also ==
- Old Town Bridge Tower
