= Old Town Bridge Tower =

Tower in Prague, Czech Republic

- Staroměstská mostecká věž
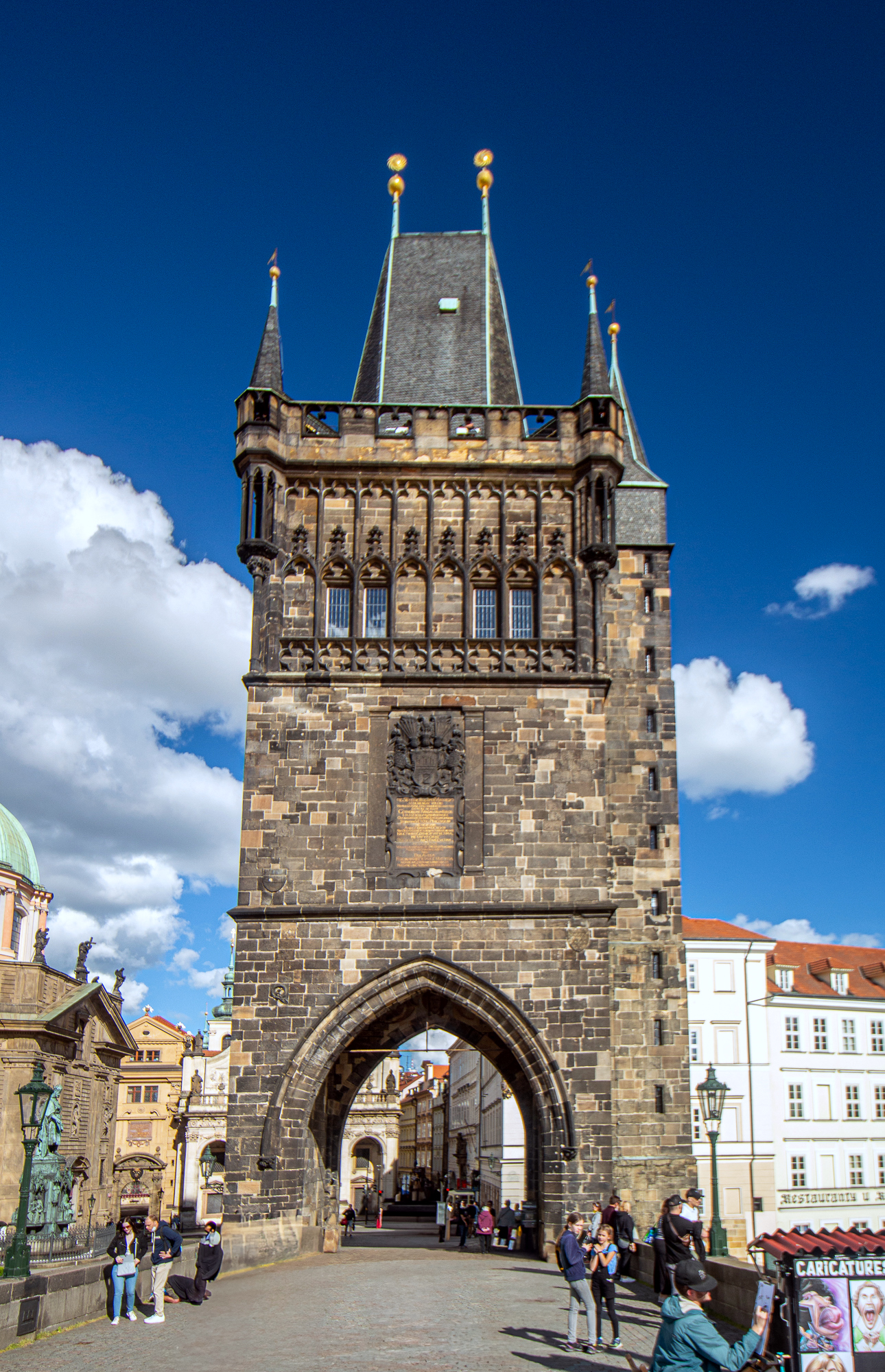
- The tower in 2012
- Interactive map of Old Town Bridge Tower
- Location: Prague, Czech Republic
- Coordinates: 50°5′10″N 14°24′49″E
- Designer: Petr Parléř
- Type: Monument
- Beginning date: 1357

Old Town Bridge Tower (Czech: Staroměstská mostecká věž) is a gothic monument located in Prague, Czech Republic. It stands on the right (east) bank of the Vltava River. Its construction began in 1357 AD, during the rule of the Emperor Charles IV. It was designed by the architect Petr Parléř.

== See also ==
- Malá Strana Bridge Tower
