= Zdeněk Šesták =

Czech composer and musicologist (1925–2026)

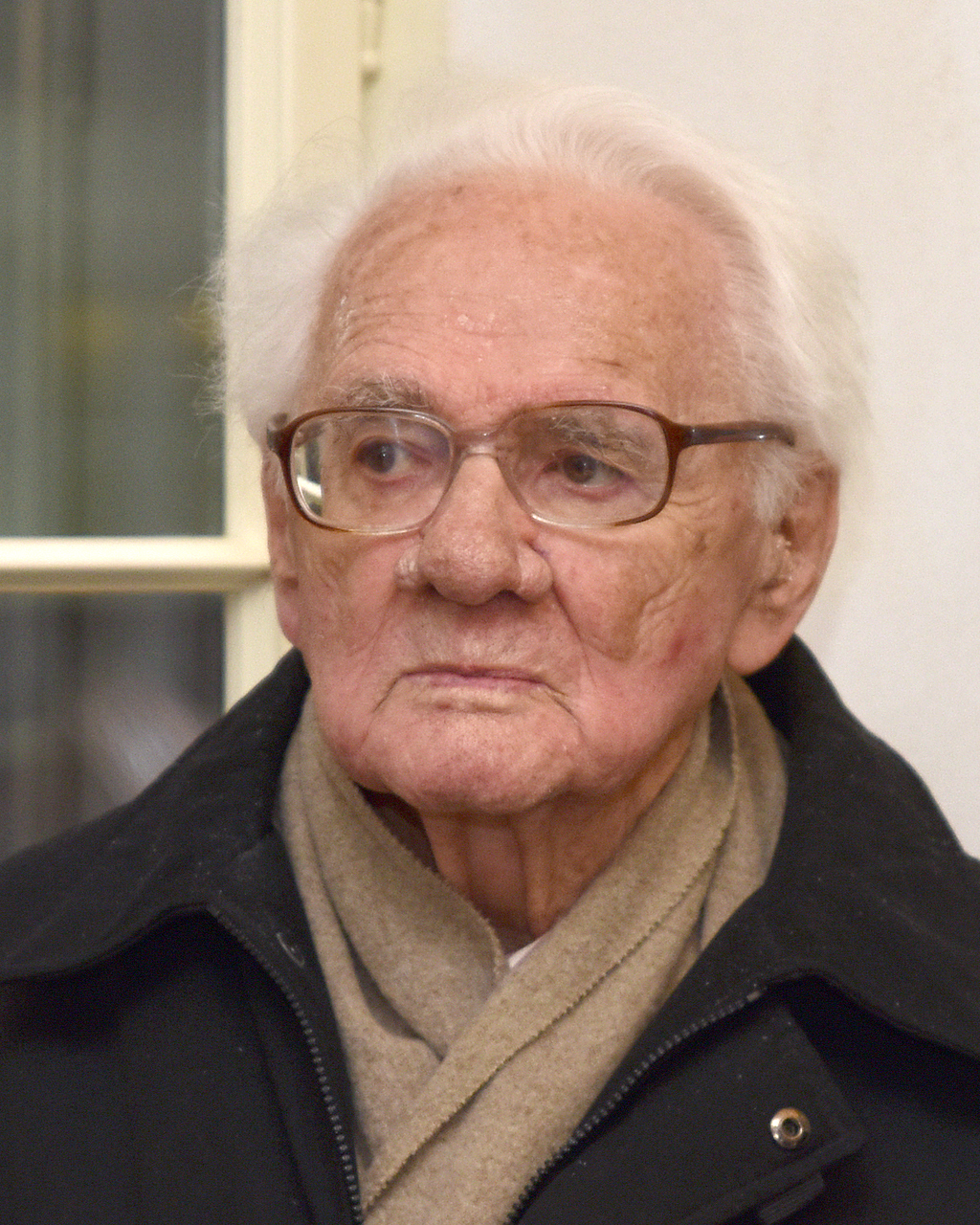
- Šesták in 2020
- Born: 10 December 1925; Cítoliby, Czechoslovakia
- Died: 21 August 2026 (aged 100); Prague, Czech Republic
- Education: Prague Conservatory; Charles University
- Occupations: Composer; Musicologist

Zdeněk Šesták (10 December 1925 – 21 August 2026) was a Czech composer, musicologist, flautist and teacher, who composed symphonies, concertante works, string quartets, and many works for voices. His compositions, even those without text, are often inspired by philosophy, literature and religion. He is known as a musicologist for his dedicated research of works by 18th-century composers of the Cítoliby school, including books about the composers, reconstruction of the music and working towards recording it, which resulted in several albums.

== Life and career ==
Šesták was born in Cítoliby on 10 December 1925, to musical parents; his father, Jan Šesták, a civil servant with the national railways, was a cellist in the Railway Philharmonic Orchestra in Prague, and his mother, Marie née Hartmanová, a teacher, sang in the church choir. He completed secondary school in Louny in 1944, and then studied composition at the Prague Conservatory from 1945 to 1950 with Emil Hlobil and Miroslav Krejčí. At the same time, he studied musicology at the Charles University with Josef Hutter and Jan Němeček, and he attended lectures on ancient philosophy by Jan Patočka. He was not allowed to complete his musicology studies, therefore he had to do military service in Terezín after graduating from the conservatoire.

Šesták began worked for the headquarter of the House of Folk Creativity in Prague, played flute in the Vít Nejedlý army ensemble and worked for the Army administration. In the 1950s he began to focus on composing, working freelance from 1957.

As a musicologist, he focused on researching 18th-century music that he had discovered on the Pachtov Estate in his hometown Cítoliby, by Václav Jan Kopřiva and his son Karel Blažej Kopřiva, Jan Adam Gallina, Jan Nepomuk Venta and Jakub Lokaj, who were later labelled the Citoliby School of Composers. He wrote a number of authoritative studies about these composers and the monograph Musica antiqua Citolibensis (Early music from Cítoliby). published in Citoliby and Louny in 2009. He prepared recordings of their music that appeared on two vinyl albums by Supraphon in 1968 and 1985, and on four later CDs.

In 1968 and 1969 Šesták was the chief program director for symphonic, chamber and vocal music at the Czechoslovak Radio. In the early 1990s, he lectured musicology at Charles University.

He was a member of the Society of Czech Composers, of the Přítomnost association for contemporary music, the Umělecká beseda, and of the Pondělníci Association. In 2006, his contribution to the philosophy of education earned him an award from the Dagmar and Václav Havel Foundation. In 2008, he received an award from the Ministry of Culture for his life-long contribution to Czech culture in music. In 2013 he received the Gold Award from the Copyright Protection Association for his life's work. Viktor Bezdíček wrote his biography, In Search of Light: A Portrait of the Composer Zdeněk Šesták.

On the occasion of his centenary, several concerts were held across the Czech Republic, including concert of the Society of Czech Composers at the Martinů Hall of the music faculty at the Academy of Performing Arts in Prague. Czech Radio Vltava produced a ten-part adaptation of his biography, aired on weekdays. The text was accompanied by the composer's music.

Šesták died in Prague on 21 August 2026, at the age of 100.

== Compositions ==
Šesták composed symphonic music, choral and vocal pieces and chamber music. His first compositions were inspired by 20th-century music, but in the 1970s he found a personal style of expressive chords and defined themes in "concise forms and proportional balance". His works often have philosophical or spiritual dimensions. His symphonic style has been compared to Honegger, and his music described as with a strong neoclassical flavour, but harmonically uncompromising, and often leading to a "final brightening and catharsis". His works include:

=== Music for choir and orchestra ===
- Fatum, fragment after Sophokles for soloists, choir, orchestra and organ (1983)
- Královna Dagmar (Queen Dagmar), oratorio after a text by Dagmar Ledečová (1989)

=== Orchestral music ===
- Symphonic Phantasy, variations (1966)
- Symphony No. 2 (1970)
- Symphony No. 3 (1971)
- Symphony No. 4 for string orchestra (1973)
- Concerto for string orchestra (1973)
- Sonata sinfonica for wind orchestra, glockenspiel and timpani (1976)
- Symphony No. 5 "Chronos" (1978)
- Symphony No. 6 "Věčný nepokoj srdce" (Eternal restlessness of the heart) (1979)
- Symphonic Variations "Zpřítomnění okamžiku" (Bringing the Moment to Life) (1980)
- Symphonic Fresco "Paměť" (Memory) (1981)
- Dramatic Symphonic Image "Euripides" (2001)

=== Concertante works ===
- Violin Concerto No. 1 "Sursum corda" (1981)
- Viola Concerto "Sokratovské meditace" (Socratic meditations) (1982)
- Violin Concerto No. 2 "Jan houslista" (Jan the violinist) (1983)
- Cello Concerto No. 1 "Světlo naděje" (The light of hope) (2002)
- Cello Concerto No. 2 "Cesta poznání" (The path of knowledge) (2005)

=== Sacred music ===
- Missa brevis Citolibensis, cantata (1949)
- In Deo speravit cor meum, cantata (1976)
- Cantate Domino canticum novum, cantata (1981)
- Laudate Dominum omnes gentes, cantata (1983)
- Excita, Domine corda nostra, cantata (1989)
- Laetentur coeli et exultet terra, cantata (1992)
- Canticum poeticum de Adalberto sancto, cantata for soloists, choir and organ (1996)

=== Chamber music ===
- String Quartet No. 3 "Akroasis" (1974)
- String Quartet No. 4 "Známý hlas" (Vertraute Stimme) (1975)
- String Quintet No. 1 "Concentus musicus" (1975)
- String Quartet No. 5 "Labyrint duše" (Labyrinth of the soul) (1976)
- String Quartet No. 6 "Máchovské variace" (Mácha variations) (1993)
- String Quartet No. 7 "Soliloquia" (1994)
- String Quartet No. 8 "Hledání světla" (In search of light) (1996)
- String Quartet No. 9 "Sisyfos" (Sisyphos) (1999)
- String Quintet No. 2 "Conscientia temporis" (2000)
- String Sextet "Chvála života" (Praise of life) (2001)

=== Choral music ===
- Co to zvoní, co to cinká (What's that ringing, what's that tinkling), to a text by Jan Čarek for children's choir and piano (1959)
- Hommage à Apollinaire for mixed choir a cappella (1972)
- Portrét Konstantina Biebla (Portrait of Konstantin Biebl), after his texts, for mixed choir a cappella (1974)
- Puškinské vigilie (Vigil for Puschkin) for mixed choir a cappella (1978)
- Zvěstování jara (Announcement of spring), cantata after Slovak folk poetry for children's choir and piano (1979)
- Vítej, slunko líbezné (Welcome, lovely sun), cantata after Czech folk poetry for children's choir and piano (1980)
- Vychádzalo súnečko (The sun was rising), cantata after Moravian folk poetry for children's choir and piano (1980)
- Kdež ta ruože prokvitá (Where does this rose bloom), cantata after Medieval Czech folk poetry for children's choir and piano (1982)
- V nově zem se zase směje (The land is smiling once more), cantata after Antonín Jaroslav Puchmajer for children's choir and piano (1984)
