= Dionysio Miseroni =

Gem artist from Bohemia

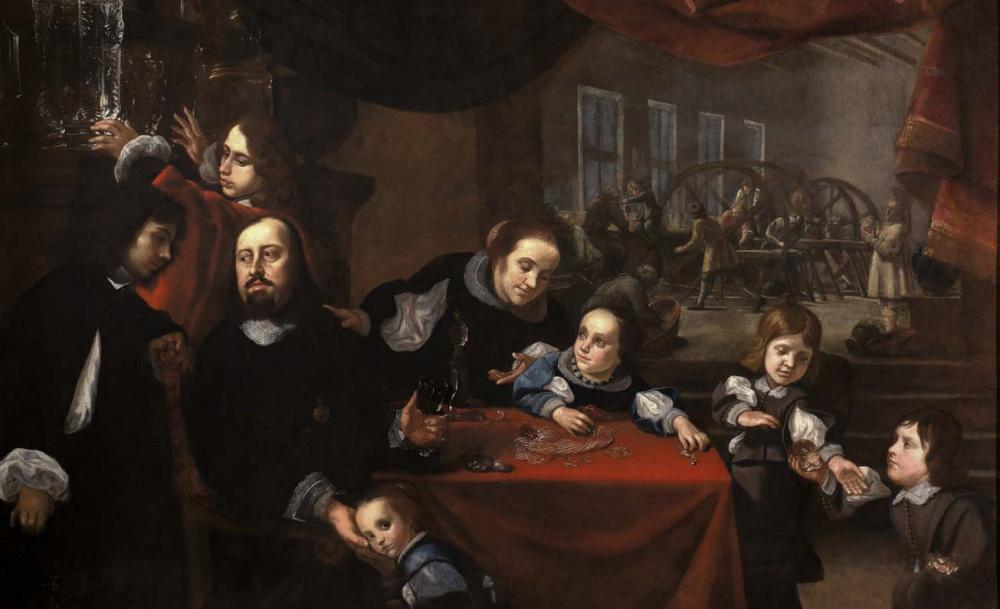
Portrait of the gem-cutter Dionysio Miseroni and his family, by Karel Škréta, 1653

Dionysio Miseroni von Lison (1607, Prague – 1661, Prague) was jeweler, gemcutter, and glass cutter from Bohemia. He was a member of very famous Miseroni family who were important jewelers and gemcutters from Milan: the archive information for the Milanese Miseroni family dates back to the 15th century, when there is traces, in 1453, of Giovanni Francesco or Francesco, son of Gasparo, mentioned in 1460 as a member of the goldsmiths' guild, of which he was appointed consul in 1468 and 1475, and abbas in 1480 and again in 1488.

== Biography ==
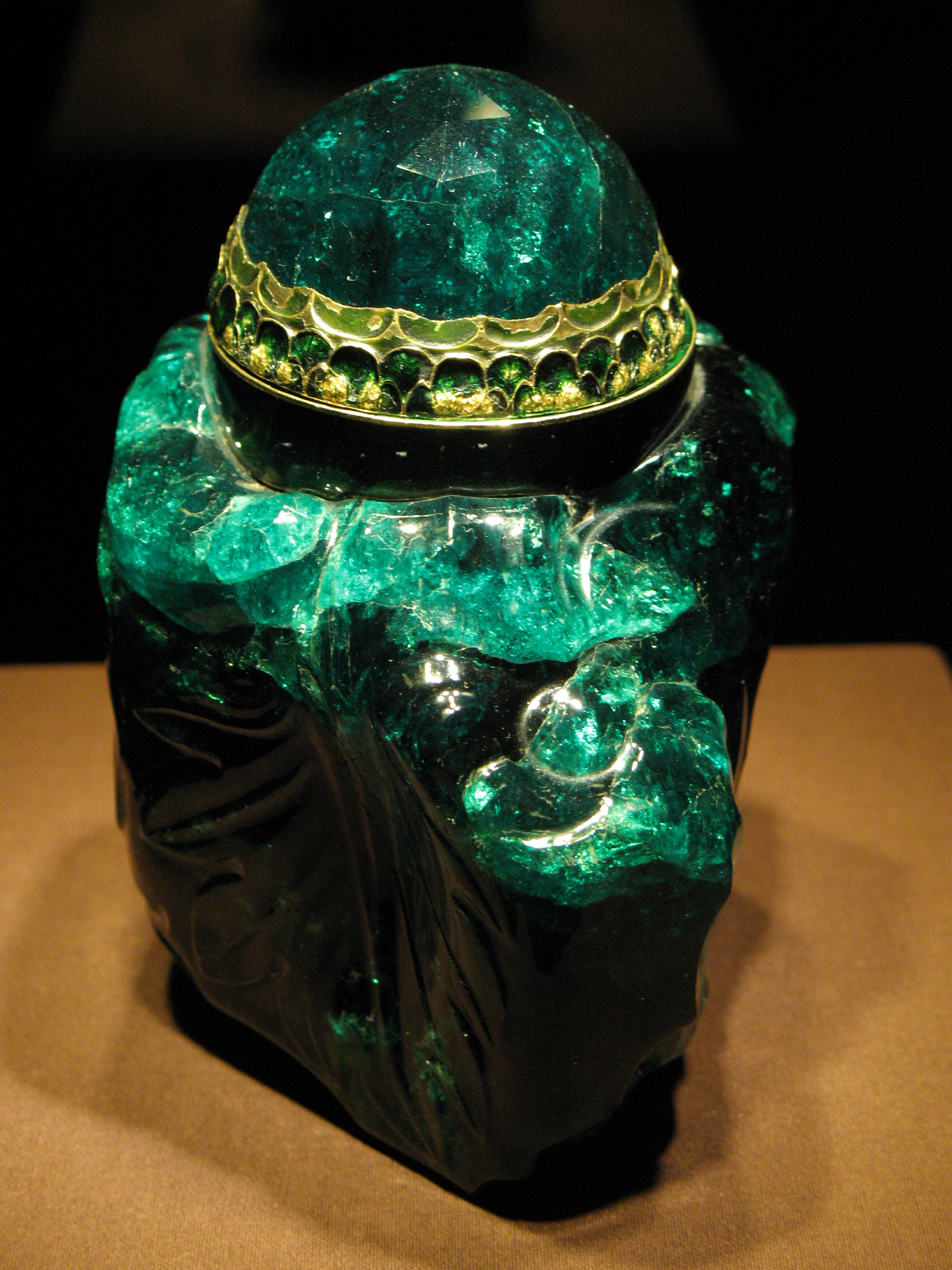
Emerald Unguentarium, commissioned by Emperor Ferdinand II and produced in Prague in 1641; part of Austrian Crown Jewels

He was the son of the stonecutter Ottavio Miseroni from Lissone near Monza, who settled in Prague and founded a gemstone mill in Prague - Bubeneč. He succeeded his father and became a gemcutter and Imperial Treasure Warden in the Prague Castle. He moved to Vienna after Ferdinand III died, but returned to Prague. He was buried in the church of Saint Mary Magdalena in Prague-Malá Strana. He was succeeded in his workshop by his son Ferdinand Eusebius Miseroni.

== Works ==
- Salt or balm container, cut emerald in poids of 2860 carats, mounted in gold, Kunsthistorisches Museum Vienna
- Rock crystal vase in a form of pyramide, Kunsthistorisches Museum Vienna
- Baptismal set of lapis lazuli, Kunsthistorisches Museum Vienna
- Pair of vases with flowers, agate, jasper and topas, Kunsthistorisches Museum Vienna
- Bowl with a triton figurine, cut jasper, white enamel, gold; Walters Art Museum Baltimore
- Cameos

== Literature ==
- Heinrich Klapsia, Dionysio Miseroni, Jahrbuch des Kaiserhauses SAK, N.F. XIII., 1944, p. 301–358.
- Rudolf Distelberger, Manfred-Leithe-Jaspers: The Kunsthistorisches Museum in Vienna, the imperial and ecclesiastic Treasury. Vienna 1997, p. 7.
- Stanislav Urban, Řezáči drahých kamenů (Gemcutters). Museum of applied arts in Prague 1976, s. 90–95 (in Czech)
