= Church of Saint Procopius, Žižkov =

Church in Prague, Czech Republic

Coordinates: 50°5′2.795″N 14°27′2.263″E

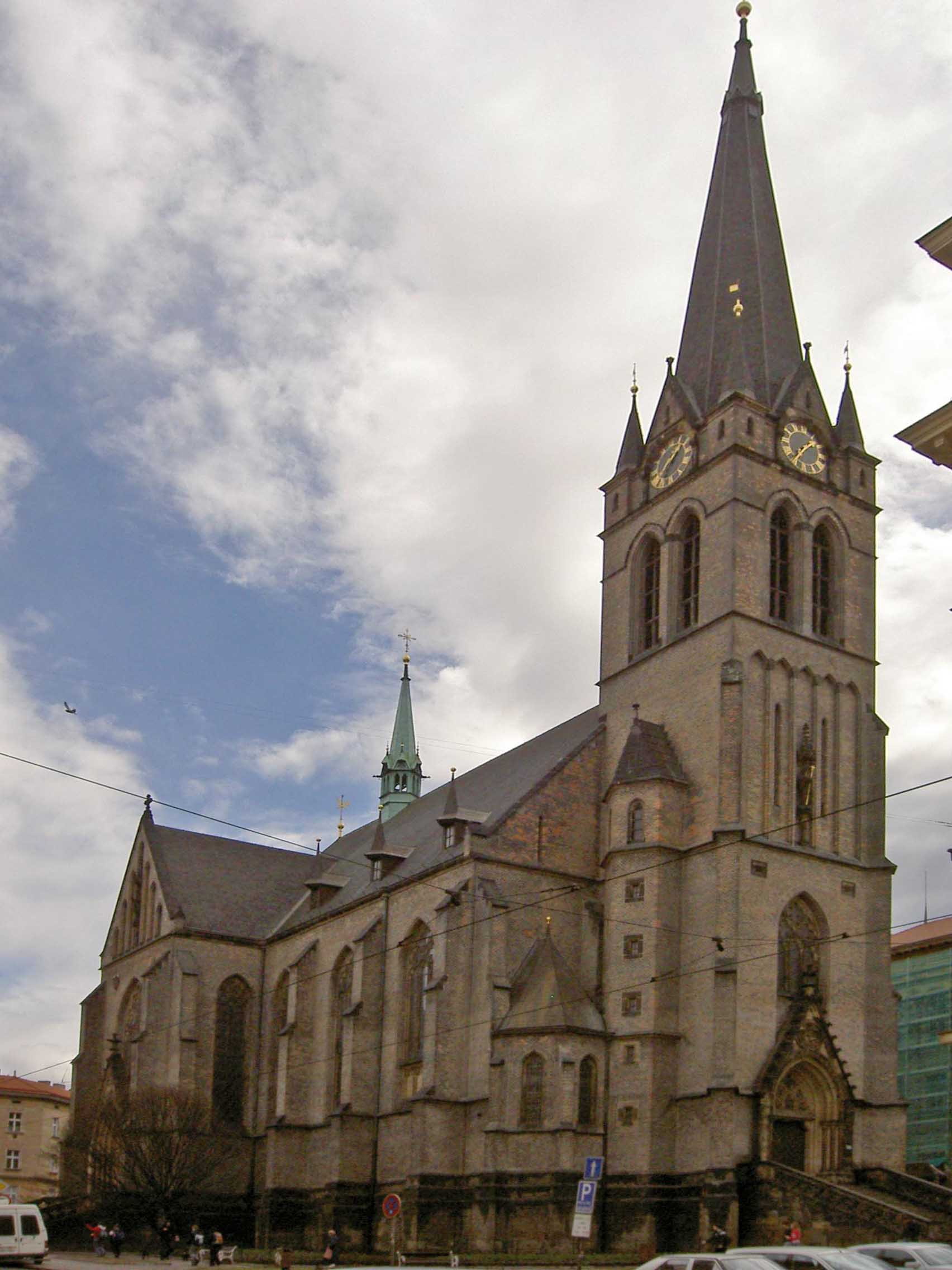
Western entrance of St. Procopius Church

St. Procopius Church (Czech: Kostel svatého Prokopa) is the parish church of the district of Žižkov in Prague, Czech Republic. Dedicated to the patron saint of Bohemia, Procopius of Sázava, the three-aisled Neo-Gothic church, located at Sladkovského Square on Seifertova Street, was designed by Bohemian architects Josef Mocker (who completed St. Vitus Cathedral) and František Mikš. Its steeple dominates the skyline of Žižkov (along with the more-recently constructed Žižkov Television Tower).

== History ==
Žižkov became an independent city in 1881, but at the time did not have a sufficiently large Catholic church for its population. An association for the establishment of a Catholic church was formed in 1879. In 1883, it bought a building with a large dance hall, which was converted into a simply-decorated chapel dedicated to the Virgin Mary. This chapel accommodated thousands of the faithful for more than 20 years, even after the dedication of St. Procopius Church, closing only in 1919.

The foundation stone for St. Procopius Church was ceremonially laid by the Archbishop of Prague, Cardinal František Schönborn, on October 30, 1898 on the 50th anniversary of the reign of Franz Joseph I of Austria. Therefore, in the first years of its existence, the church was known as the "Jubilee" Church. Construction lasted five years.

The church was consecrated on September 27, 1903 by Cardinal Lev Skrbenský z Hříště in the presence of the governor of the Kingdom of Bohemia, Archduke Karl Ferdinand, Count of Coudenhove, with his wife. The first parish priest was Mons. Eduard Šittler.

Between 1992 and 1997, the church was thoroughly restored, with the support of the district administration.

== Exterior ==
The church is over 51 meters long and 17 meters wide, and accommodates 2000 people. The height of the dome is 16 meters and the tower is 73 meters high.

The church has two entrances, on the northern and western sides. The tympanum over the north entrance has a relief depicting the Madonna with the Infant Jesus in the middle and a kneeling St. Procopius on her right side presenting her a model of the church. Over the west entrance is a relief of St. Adalbert. Both works come from the workshop of Josef Pekárek, a pupil of Josef Václav Myslbek.

== Interior ==
Of the interior furnishings, the most famous is a painting by Karel Škréta of St. Wenceslaus defending Prague against the Swedes in 1649. The painting had originally belonged to the Emauzy monastery.

The main altar is Neo-Gothic, designed by architect František Mikš. In the center is a statue by the sculptor Štěpán Zálešák of St. Procopius, the patron saint of the church, surrounded by Saints Cyril and Methodius. Eight panel paintings by Karel Ludvík Klusáček present scenes from the life of St. Procopius. The top of the altar is decorated with a group of the Crucifixion of Our Lord.

A side altar has a statuette of Madonna with Jesus, possibly the original from the first half of the 15th century. It was saved during the Thirty Years' War in the house called At the Three Acorns in the New Town of Prague, where it was held until 1742. The chapel of Our Lady, on the right side, has a panel with scenes from her life. The chapel of the Divine Heart of Our Lord, on the left, has images of St. Augustine and St. Alois. These were also made by Zálešák.

The Baroque Venice chandelier was donated to the church by the Prince of Auersperg. The pulpit with granite stairs was made according to the design of Mikš. The organ was made by the Žižkov company of Emanuel Peter.

The stained glass windows were made according to designs of Klusáček. The last window in the south of the nave, originally design of Cyril Bouda, was successfully completed only in 1992. The scene shows the meeting of Duke Oldřich with St. Procopius in the woods of Sázava.
