= Slavětín (Louny District) =

- Market town
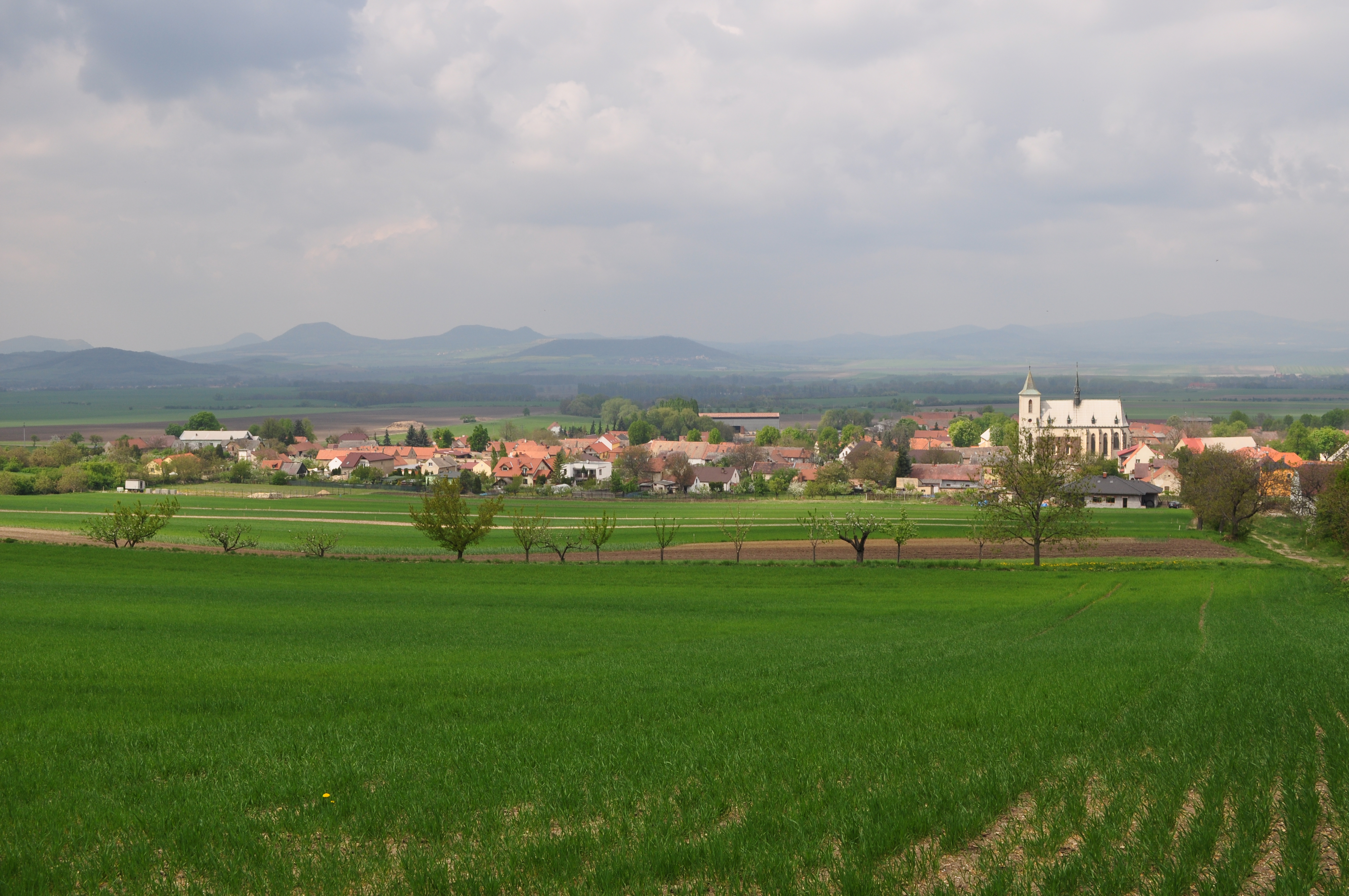
- Panorama of Slavětín with the Central Bohemian Uplands in the background

- Coat of arms

- Location in the Czech Republic
- Coordinates: 50°21′3″N 13°54′28″E
- Country: Czech Republic
- Region: Ústí nad Labem
- District: Louny
- First mentioned: 1269

Area
  - Total: 8.37 km^{2} (3.23 sq mi)
- Elevation: 230 m (750 ft)

Population (2026-01-01)
  - Total: 667
  - Density: 79.7/km^{2} (206/sq mi)
- Time zone: UTC+1 (CET)
  - Summer (DST): UTC+2 (CEST)
- Postal codes: 439 09, 440 01
- Website: www.slavetin.info

Slavětín (Czech pronunciation: [ˈslavjɛciːn]) is a market town in Louny District in the Ústí nad Labem Region of the Czech Republic. It has about 700 inhabitants.

== Administrative division ==
Slavětín consists of two municipal parts (in brackets population according to the 2021 census):

- Slavětín (587)
- Kystra (22)

== Etymology ==
The name is derived from the personal name Slavata, meaning "Slavata's (court)".

== Geography ==
Slavětín is located about 7 kilometres (4 mi) east of Louny and 44 km (27 mi) northwest of Prague. It lies in a mainly agricultural landscape in the Lower Ohře Table. The highest point is at 332 m (1,089 ft) above sea level. The northern municipal border is former by the Ohře River.

== History ==
The first written mention of Slavětín is from 1269, when Prague bishop Jan III of Dražice received the settlement from King Ottokar II.

== Demographics ==
Historical population

Year	Pop.	±%
1869	689	—
1880	664	−3.6%
1890	693	+4.4%
1900	769	+11.0%
1910	780	+1.4%

Year	Pop.	±%
1921	853	+9.4%
1930	896	+5.0%
1950	655	−26.9%
1961	621	−5.2%
1970	577	−7.1%

Year	Pop.	±%
1980	495	−14.2%
1991	423	−14.5%
2001	423	+0.0%
2011	463	+9.5%
2021	609	+31.5%

Source: Censuses

== Transport ==
Slavětín is located on the railway line Česká Lípa–Postoloprty.

== Sights ==
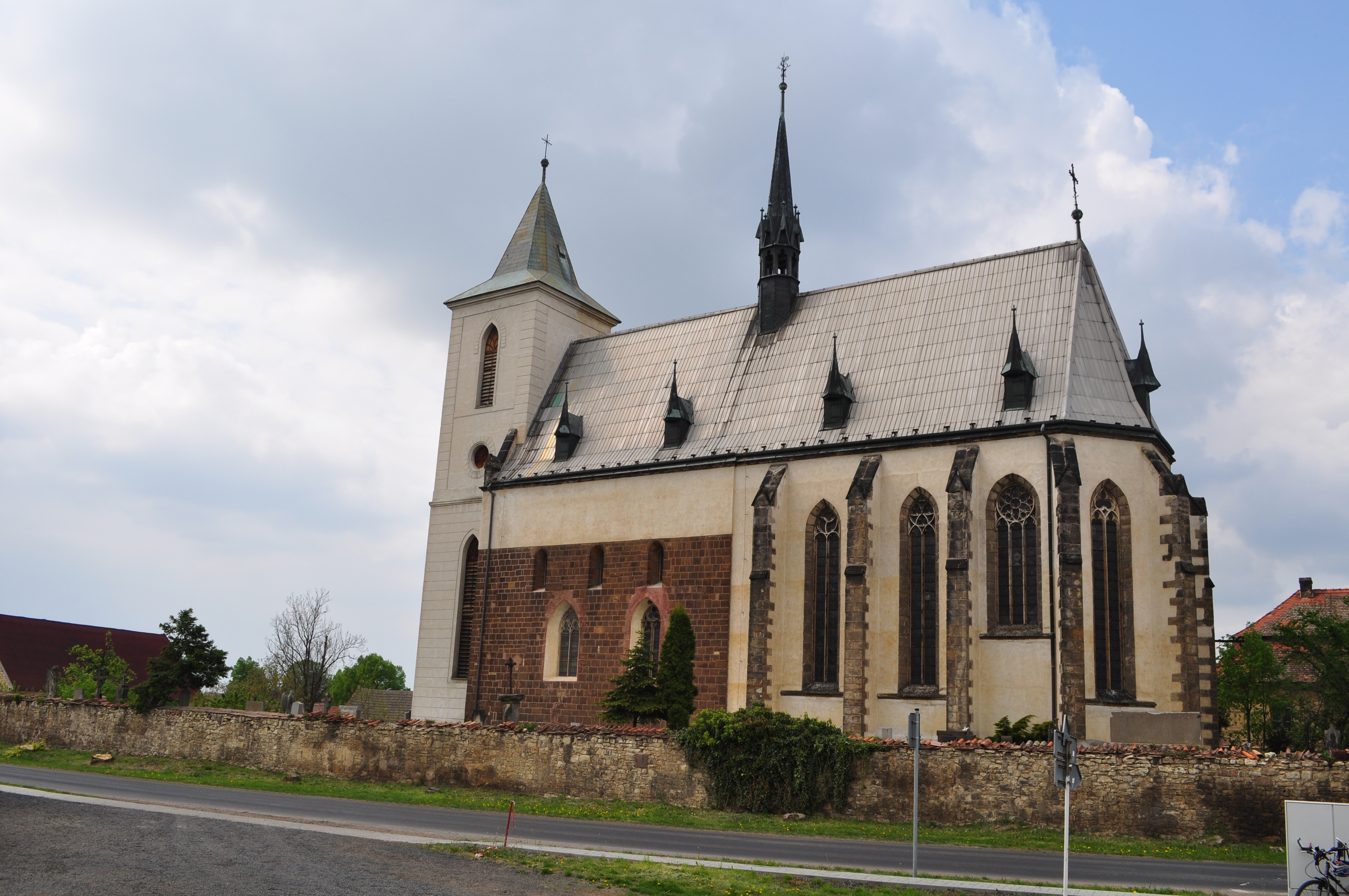
Church of Saint James the Great

The main landmark of Slavětín is the Church of Saint James the Great. It is a rare medieval monument. It was built in the Romanesque style in the 13th century and rebuilt in the Gothic style in the 14th century. The original tower was replaced by the current one in 1837. In 1880–1881, the church was restored by Josef Mocker.

A notable building is the octagonal Chapel of the Visitation of the Virgin Mary. It was built in the early Baroque style in 1672–1677.

== Notable people ==
- Konstantin Biebl (1898–1951), poet
- Otto Trefný (1932–2019), medical doctor and politician
