= Otto Trefný =

Czech medical doctor and politician (1932–2019)

Otto Trefný (9 February 1932 in Slavětín nad Ohří – 2 March 2019) was a Czech medical doctor and communist politician who served as an MP, and also as physician of the national ice hockey team. He was a member of the Czech Ice Hockey Hall of Fame.
