= Klenová (Klatovy District) =

- Municipality
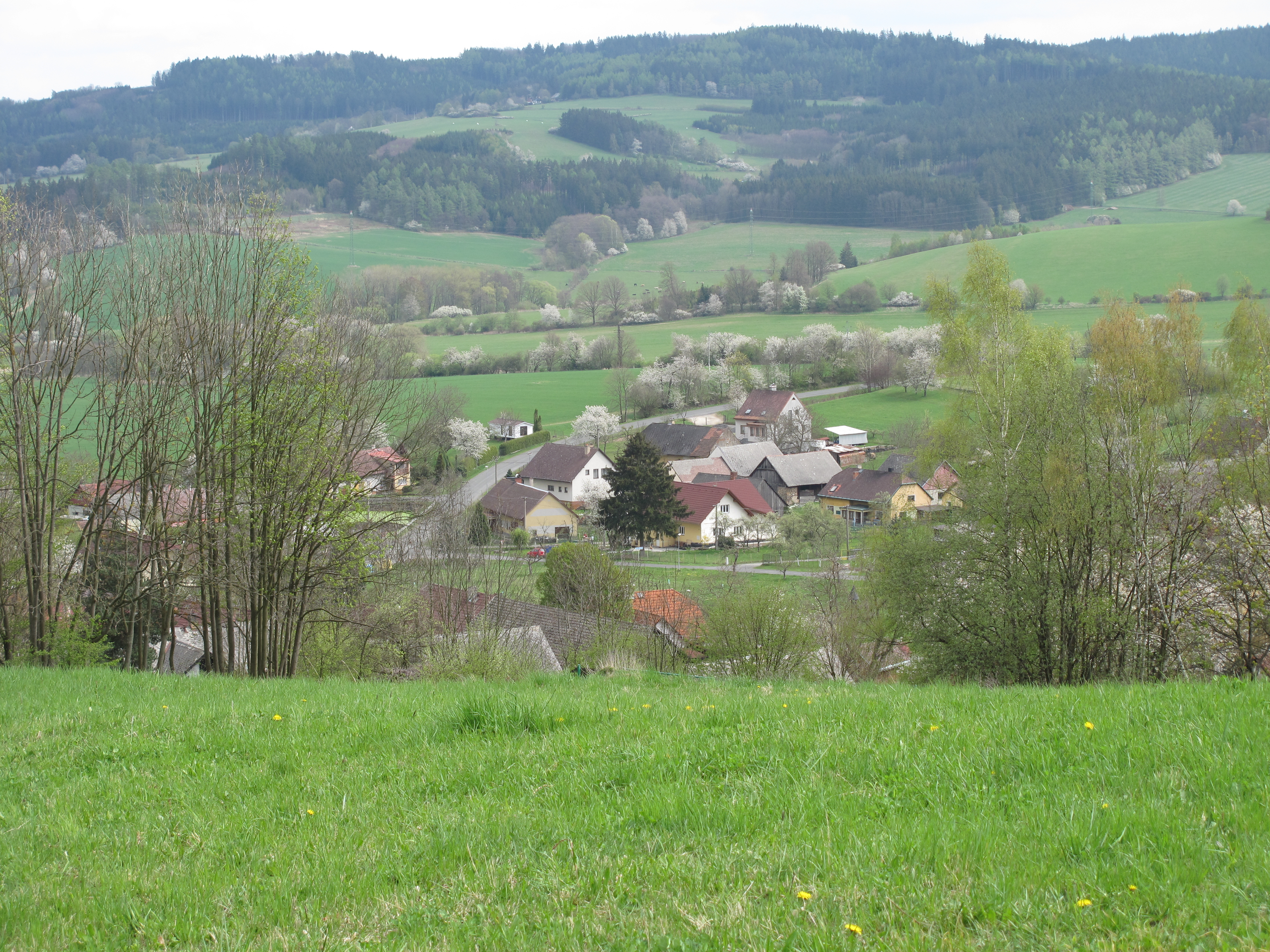
- General view

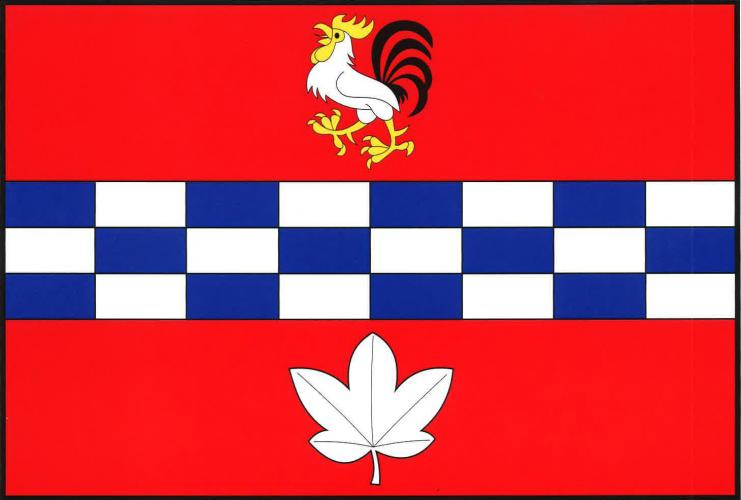
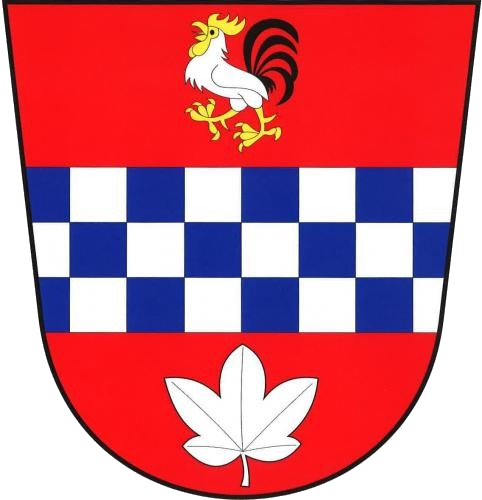
- Flag Coat of arms

- Location in the Czech Republic
- Coordinates: 49°20′0″N 13°14′0″E
- Country: Czech Republic
- Region: Plzeň
- District: Klatovy
- First mentioned: 1291

Area
  - Total: 4.21 km^{2} (1.63 sq mi)
- Elevation: 485 m (1,591 ft)

Population (2026-01-01)
  - Total: 105
  - Density: 24.9/km^{2} (64.6/sq mi)
- Time zone: UTC+1 (CET)
  - Summer (DST): UTC+2 (CEST)
- Postal code: 340 21
- Website: www.klenova.cz

Klenová is a municipality and village in Klatovy District in the Plzeň Region of the Czech Republic. It has about 100 inhabitants.

== Etymology ==
The name is derived from the Czech word klen, meaning 'sycamore'. It was originally the name of a nearby forested hill, which was transferred to the village.

== Geography ==
Klenová is located about 8 kilometres (5 mi) south of Klatovy and 45 km (28 mi) south of Plzeň. It lies in the Bohemian Forest Foothills. The highest point is at 548 m (1,798 ft) above sea level. The Jelenka Stream flows through the western part of the municipal territory.

== History ==
The first written mention of Klenová is from 1291. Among the most important owners of the village were the Harant of Polžice and Bezdružice family, who ruled Klenová from 1553 to 1637.

== Demographics ==
Historical population

Year	Pop.	±%
1869	391	—
1880	304	−22.3%
1890	342	+12.5%
1900	335	−2.0%
1910	398	+18.8%

Year	Pop.	±%
1921	358	−10.1%
1930	310	−13.4%
1950	190	−38.7%
1961	184	−3.2%
1970	168	−8.7%

Year	Pop.	±%
1980	155	−7.7%
1991	107	−31.0%
2001	119	+11.2%
2011	120	+0.8%
2021	105	−12.5%

Source: Censuses

== Transport ==
There are no railways or major roads passing through the municipality.

== Sights ==
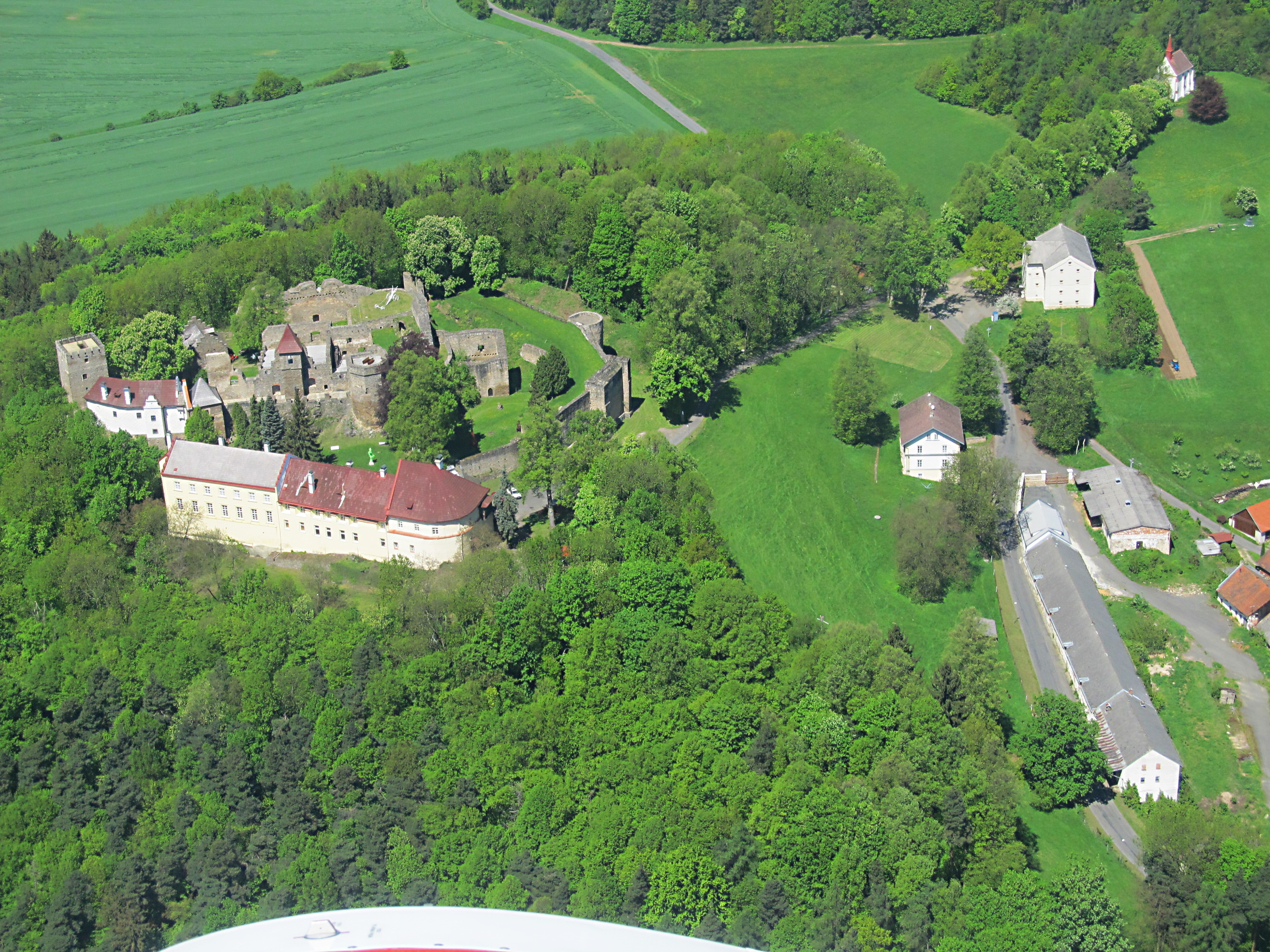
Aerial view of Klenová Castle

The most important monument of Klenová is the Klenová Castle. It was built in the Gothic style in the second half of the 13th century and has late Gothic fortifications from the 15th century. During the rule of the Harant family, the castle was rebuilt in the Renaissance style. From the 17th century, the castle was uninhabited and fell into disrepair. In the 1830s, Count Eduard Stadion of Tannhausen had rebuilt part of the castle complex in the Romanticist style. Today the castle is managed by the Klatovy/Klenová Gallery and houses an art gallery. The castle tower is open to the public and serves as a lookout tower.

A notable landmark is the Chapel of Saint Felix, located on a hill above the village. It was built in the neo-Gothic style in 1897, according to the plans by the architect Josef Mocker.

== Notable people ==
- Kryštof Harant (1564–1621), nobleman and traveller
