= Čeřenice =

- Village
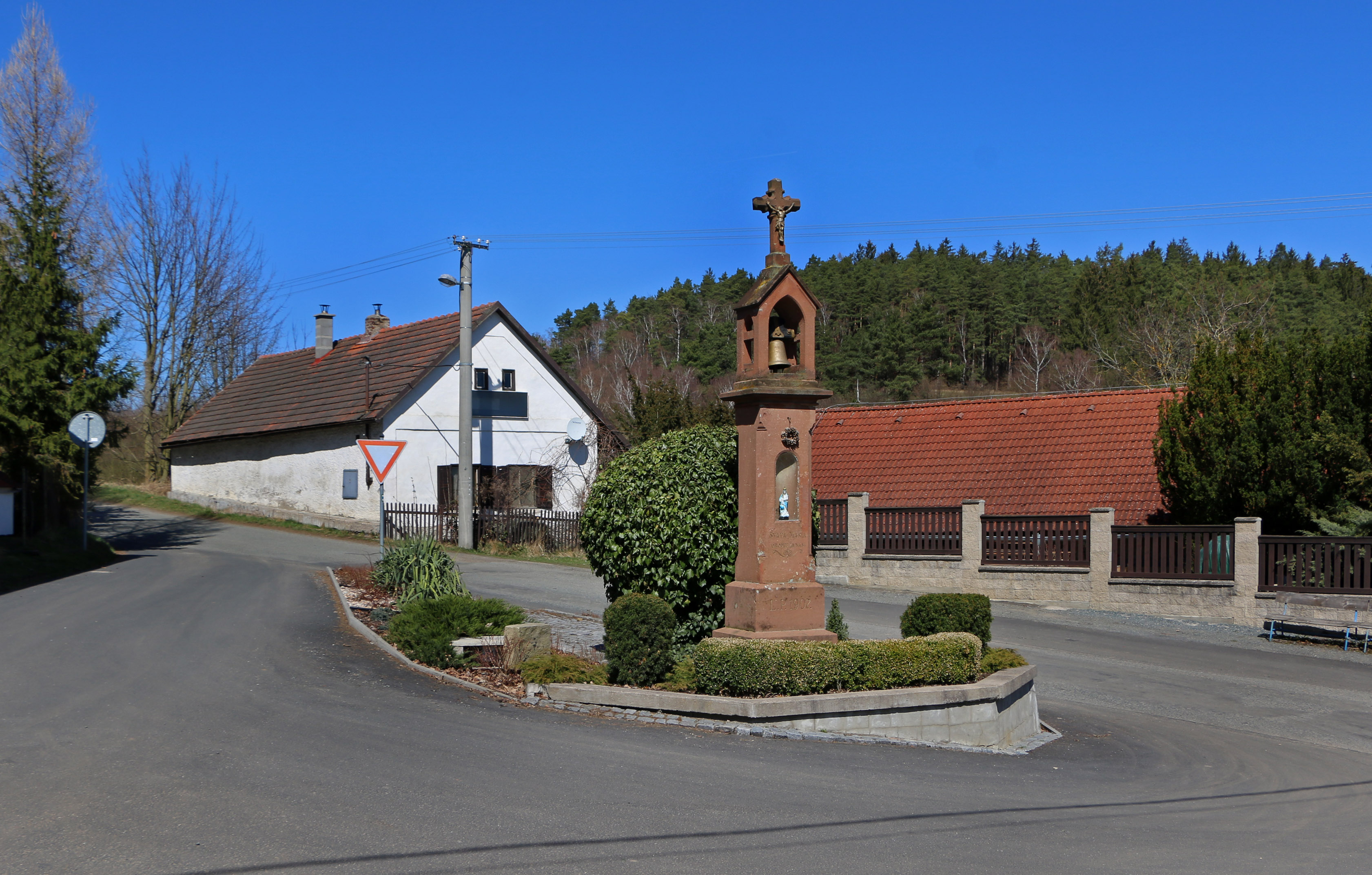
- Centre of Čeřenice

- Location in the Czech Republic
- Coordinates: 49°50′7″N 14°55′3″E
- Country: Czech Republic
- Region: Central Bohemian
- District: Benešov
- Municipality: Sázava
- First mentioned: 1377

Area
  - Total: 2.93 km^{2} (1.13 sq mi)
- Elevation: 415 m (1,362 ft)

Population (2021)
  - Total: 80
  - Density: 27/km^{2} (71/sq mi)
- Time zone: UTC+1 (CET)
  - Summer (DST): UTC+2 (CEST)
- Postal code: 285 06

Čeřenice is a village and municipal part of Sázava in Benešov District in the Central Bohemian Region of the Czech Republic. It has about 80 inhabitants.

== Demographics ==
Historical population
Year	Pop.	±%
1869	216	—
1880	256	+18.5%
1890	244	−4.7%
1900	257	+5.3%
1910	217	−15.6%
1921	186	−14.3%
1930	144	−22.6%
1950	105	−27.1%
1961	95	−9.5%
1970	69	−27.4%
1980	62	−10.1%
1991	63	+1.6%
2001	58	−7.9%
2011	56	−3.4%
2021	80	+42.9%
Source: Censuses
