= Basilica of St. Ludmila =

Roman Catholic basilica in Prague, Czech Republic

Coordinates: 50°4′31.71″N 14°26′14.03″E

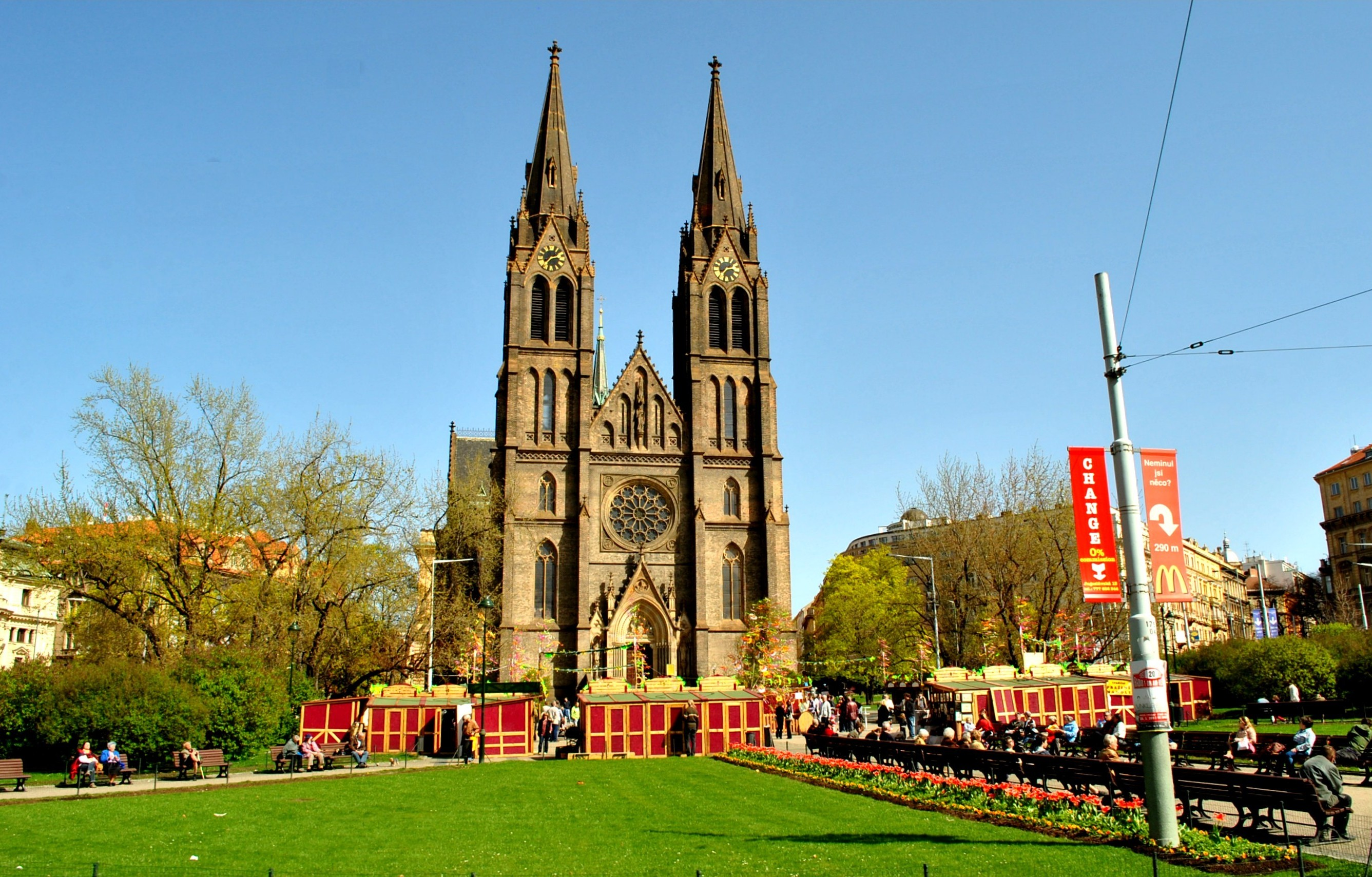
Front view

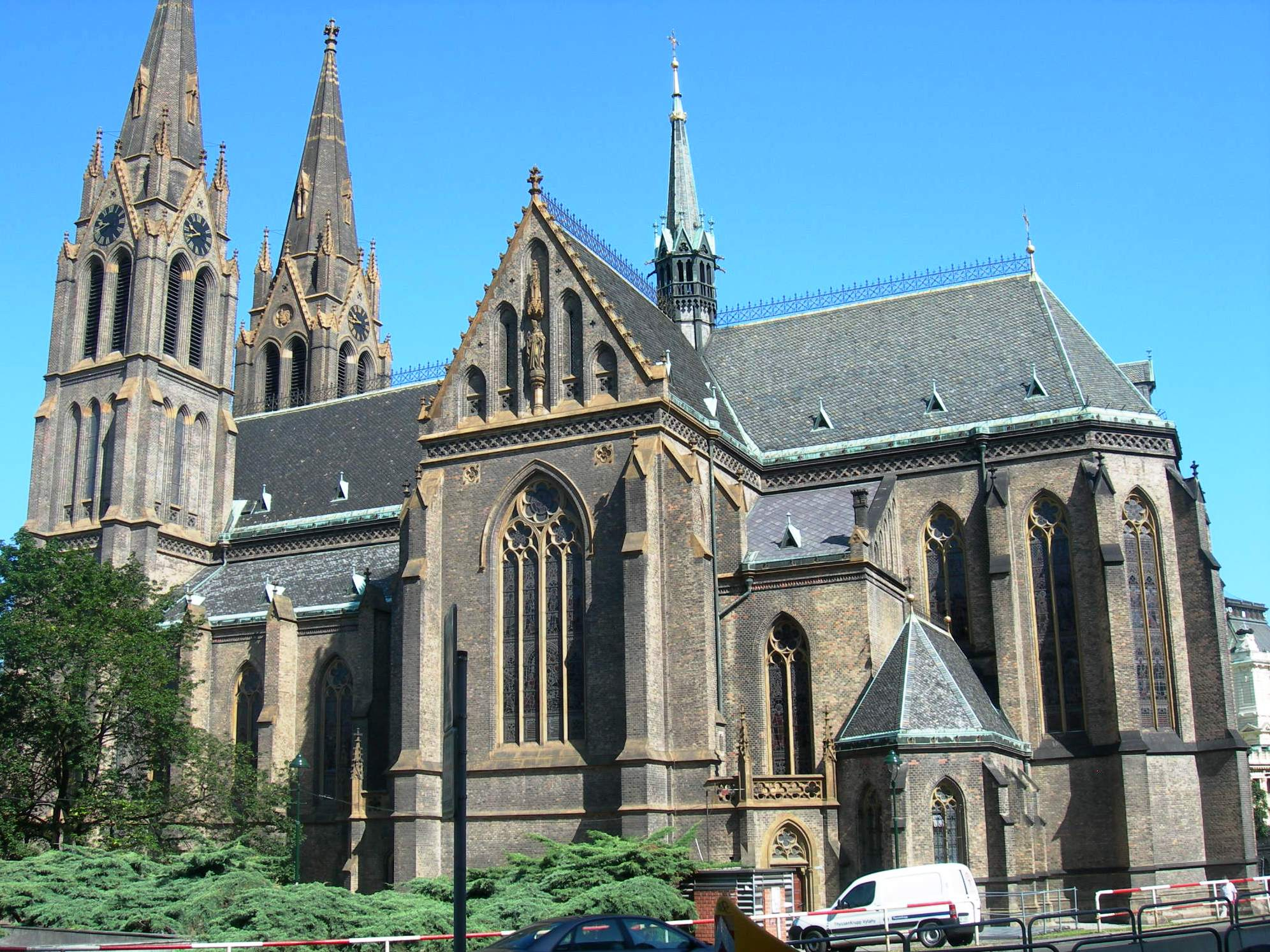
Side view

Recording of the Basilica's bells in 1933

The Basilica of St. Ludmila (Czech: bazilika svaté Ludmily) is a Catholic church at the square Náměstí Míru in Vinohrady district of Prague, Czech Republic. It was built in the neo-Gothic style according to the plans of Josef Mocker in 1888–1892. It is named in honour of Saint Ludmila of Bohemia.

It is a brick-made three-aisle basilica with a transversal nave in the shape of the cross. The church front features two 60.5m-high towers with bells and the tall gable with portal above the main entrance with sculptures. The interior of the temple excels in a rich color windows, paintings and sculptures on which participated national artists Josef Václav Myslbek, Josef Čapek and František Ženíšek.

The church was closed due to Metro construction and later for reconstruction in 1974–1992. In 1980, its major reconstruction started. By December 1984, the restoration of the southern nave was completed, where the service of the Mass was temporarily resumed in improvised setting. On 16 September 1992, the day of veneration of St. Ludmila, the whole temple was reopened in the solemn ceremony of consecration of the new altar, which was held by Cardinal Miloslav Vlk. On 3 September 1993, the bells rang again on the towers of the church.

At present, the Christmas and Easter fairs, open-air concerts, and charitable sales are often held in front of the temple. Since 2013, the videomapping has been screened every year in October on the church during the Signal festival.

In August 2022, the church was elevated by Pope Francis to the status of basilica minor.
