= Portrait of the gem-cutter Dionysio Miseroni and his family =

1653 painting by Karel Škréta

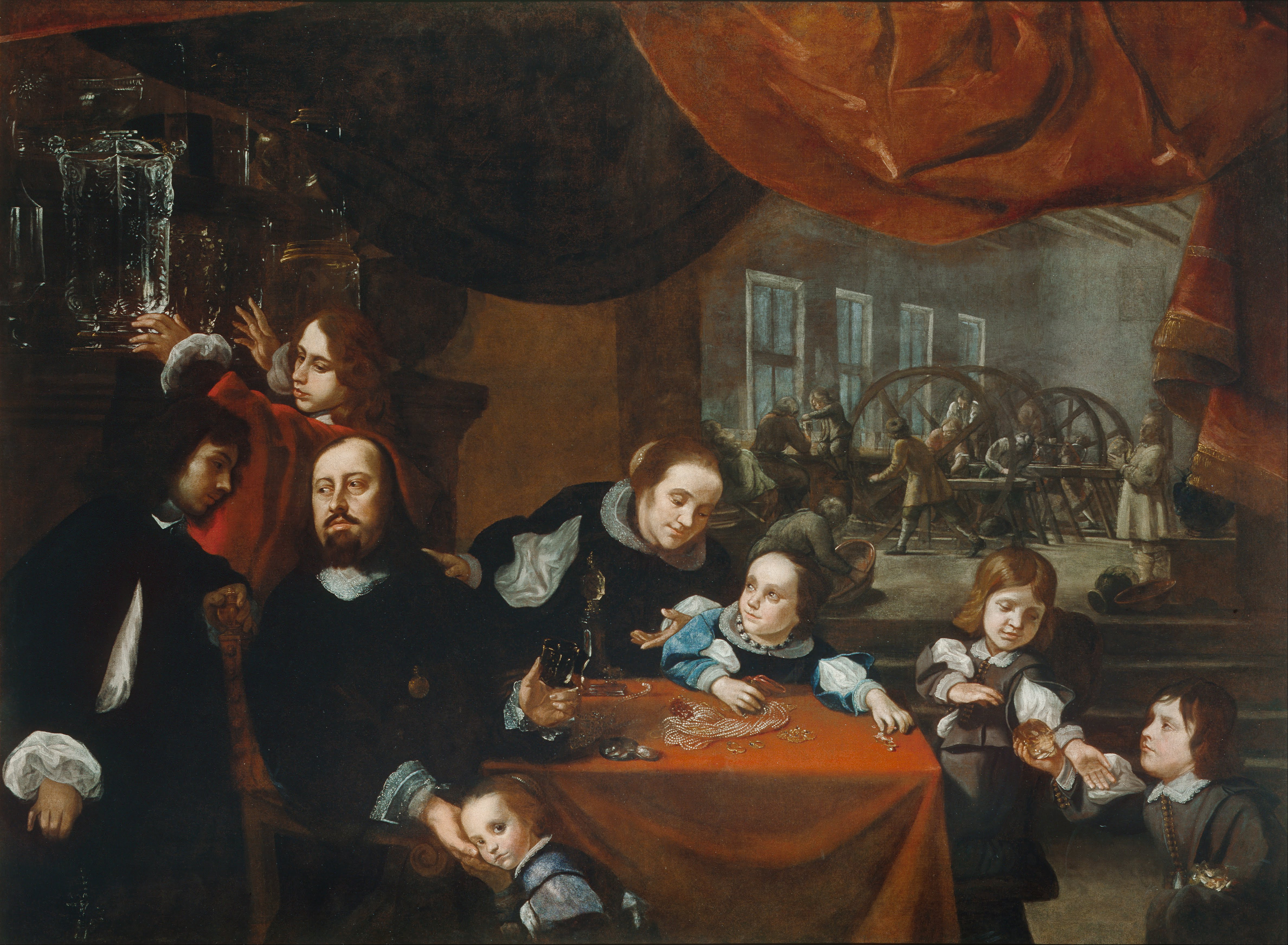
- The Family of Precious Stone Cutter Dionysius Miseroni
- Artist: Karel Škréta
- Year: 1653
- Medium: Oil on canvas
- Dimensions: 185 cm × 251 cm (73 in × 99 in)
- Location: National Gallery in Prague; Prague
- Accession: O 560

The Portrait of the Gem-cutter Dionysio Miseroni and his Family (Czech: Podobizna řezače drahokamů Dionysia Miseroniho a jeho rodiny) is a 1653 group portrait by Czech artist Karel Škréta of a lapidary craftsman and his family. This representative example of the Bohemian Baroque style is currently deposited in the Schwarzenberg Palace, a part of collection of the National Gallery in Prague, Czech Republic.

The Miseroni family, of Italian origin, was a well known producer of precious gems and metalwork in Bohemia. The painting shows its most famous member Dionysio Miseroni (1607–1661) at the height of his fame wearing his gold medal that he received from Emperor Ferdinand III. He is surrounded by members of his family, who all helped in the workshop – it is visible in the background on the right, with big wheels used for propel saws and machines which grind precious stones. His second son Ferdinand Eusebius is reaching towards a cabinet holding rock crystal vases, many of which have been identified. The central vase is considered to be the "Rock crystal pyramid" (German: Bergkristall-Pyramide) in the collection of the Kunsthistorisches Museum in Vienna, Austria. Behind the curtain on the right, the uncertain form of a vase is sometimes considered to be the large emerald vessel that Miseroni produced in 1641 and today in the collection of the Imperial Treasury in Vienna.

Miseroni inherited the workshop from his father Ottavio (1588–1624), who had been Treasurer before him at the Prague court. His first-born son Jan Octavius (with a beard and leaning towards his father) inherited the workshop in turn from him.

Details
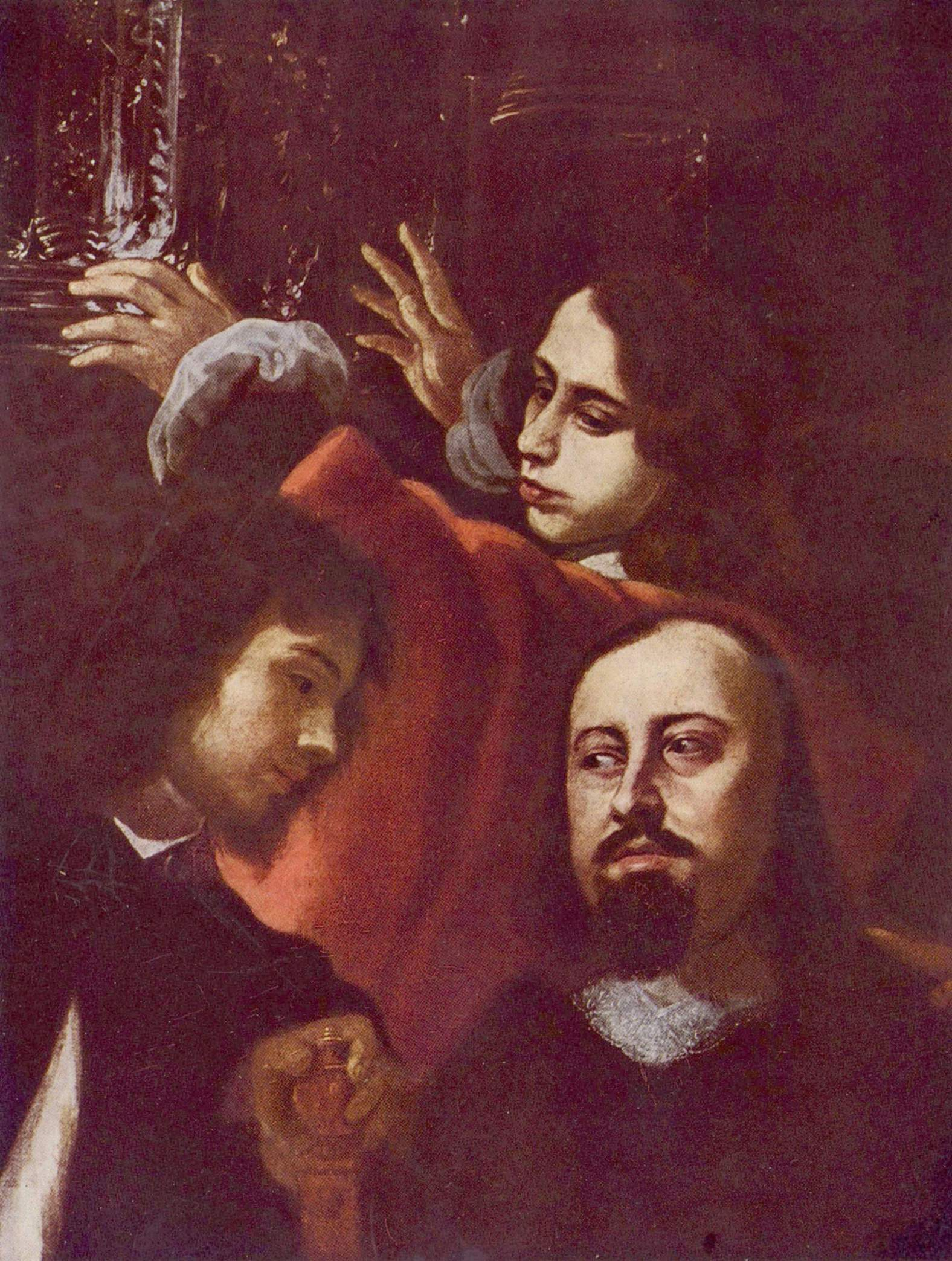
Dionysio with his older sons (on left) Jan Octavius and Ferdinand Eusebius

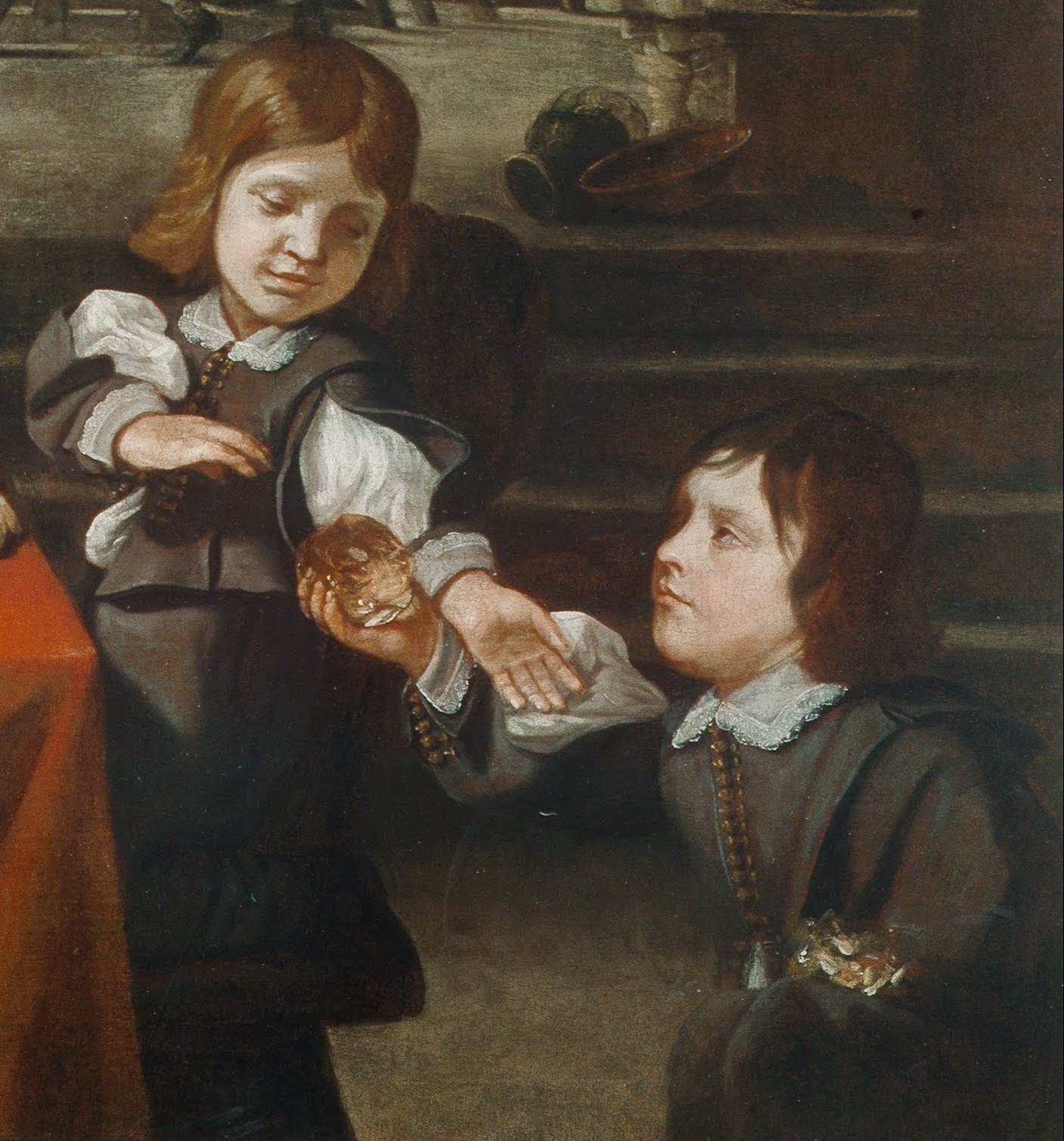
Younger Miseroni sons, Václav Eusebius (sitting) and Ignác František (with a piece of smoky quartz in hand)

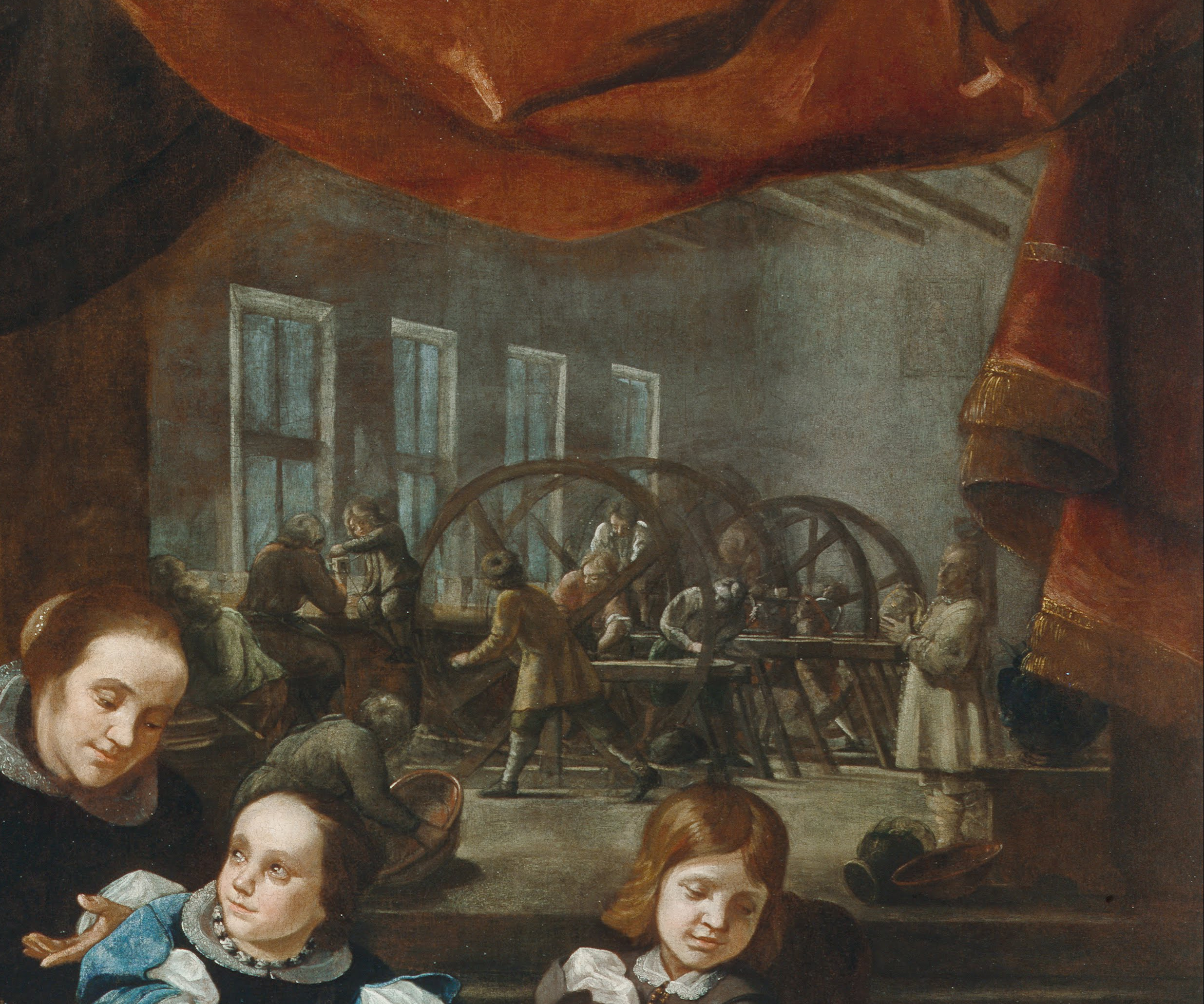
Gem cutting workshop, on the left are heads of Dionysio's wife Marie Ludmila and daughter Marie Laura
