= Josef Mocker =

Czech architect (1835–1899)

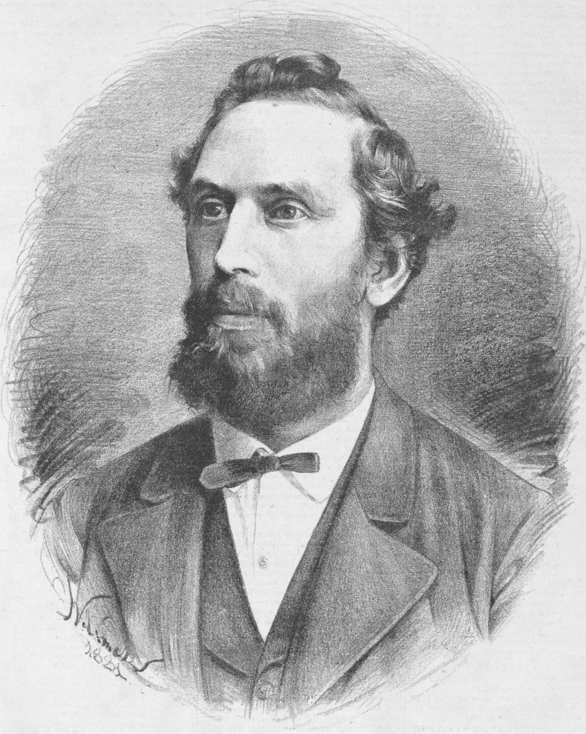
- Drawing of Mocker by Jan Vilímek
- Born: 22 November 1835; Cítoliby, Bohemia, Austrian Empire
- Died: 15 November 1899 (aged 63); Prague, Bohemia, Austria-Hungary
- Occupations: Architect, restorer

Josef Mocker (22 November 1835 – 15 November 1899) was a Czech architect and restorer. He worked in a purist neo-Gothic style and is the author of the reconstruction of many important monuments in Bohemia.

== Life ==
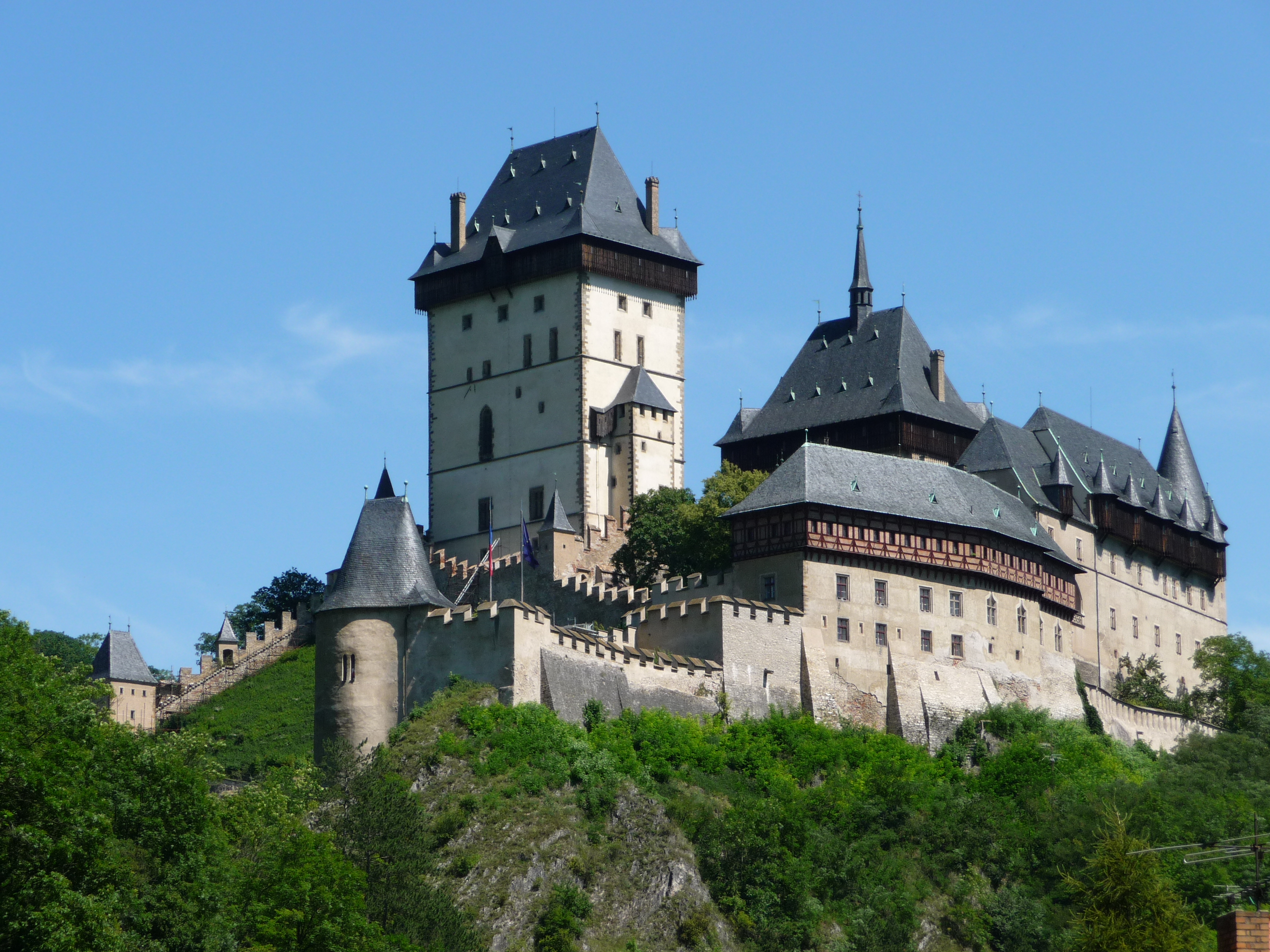
Karlštejn Castle, reconstructed by Mocker in 1887–1899

Josef Mocker was born on 22 November 1835 in Cítoliby. He studied at the Czech Technical University in Prague and at the Academy of Fine Arts Vienna. From 1863, he travelled through Austria, Hungary and Bavaria and gained valuable experience. In 1876, he was appointed Architect for Prague. He was a member of the Czech Academy of Sciences and Arts since its founding in 1890. He died in Prague on 15 November 1899, at the age of 63. He is buried at the Vyšehrad Cemetery.

== Work ==
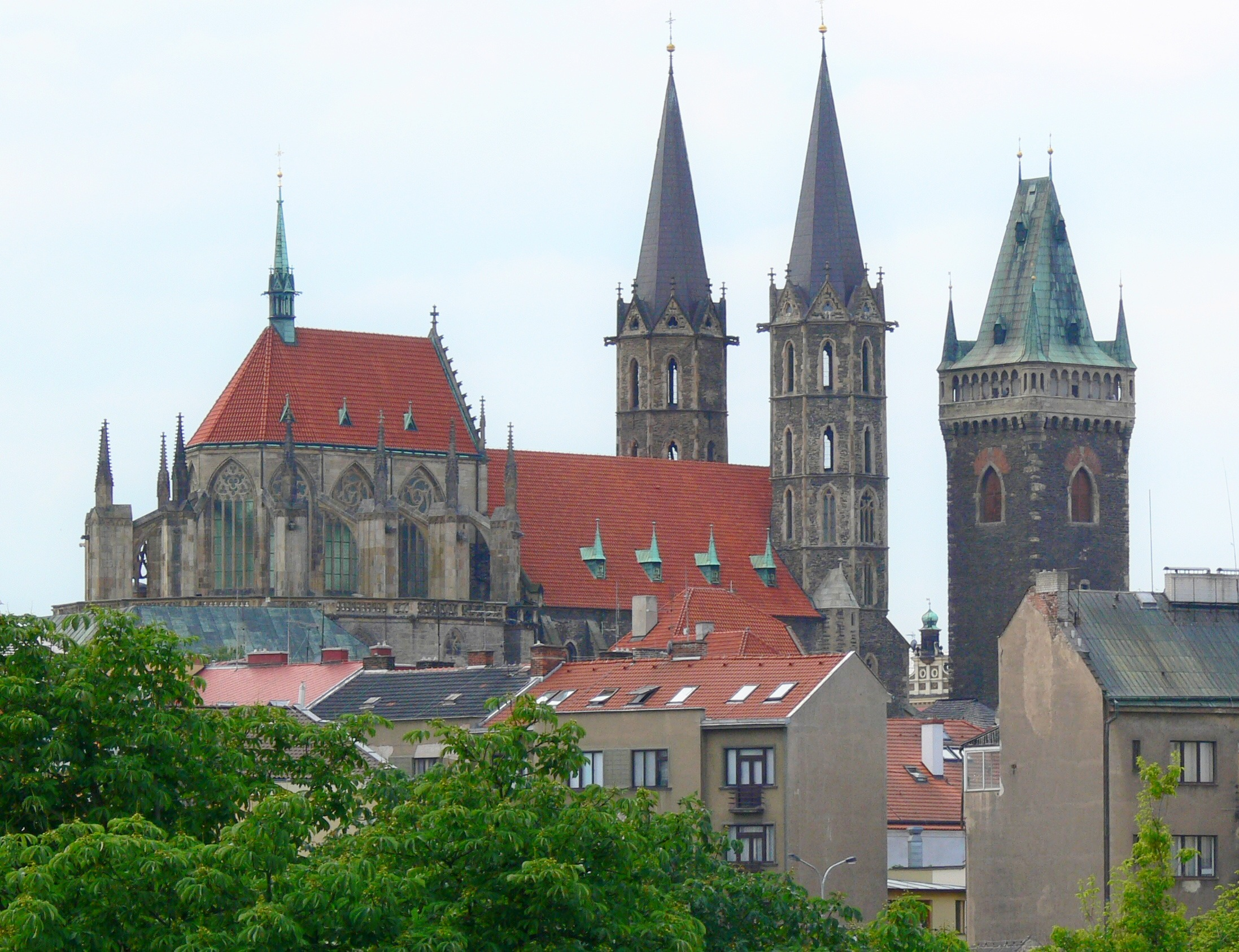
Church of Saint Bartholomew in Kolín, reconstructed in 1878–1910

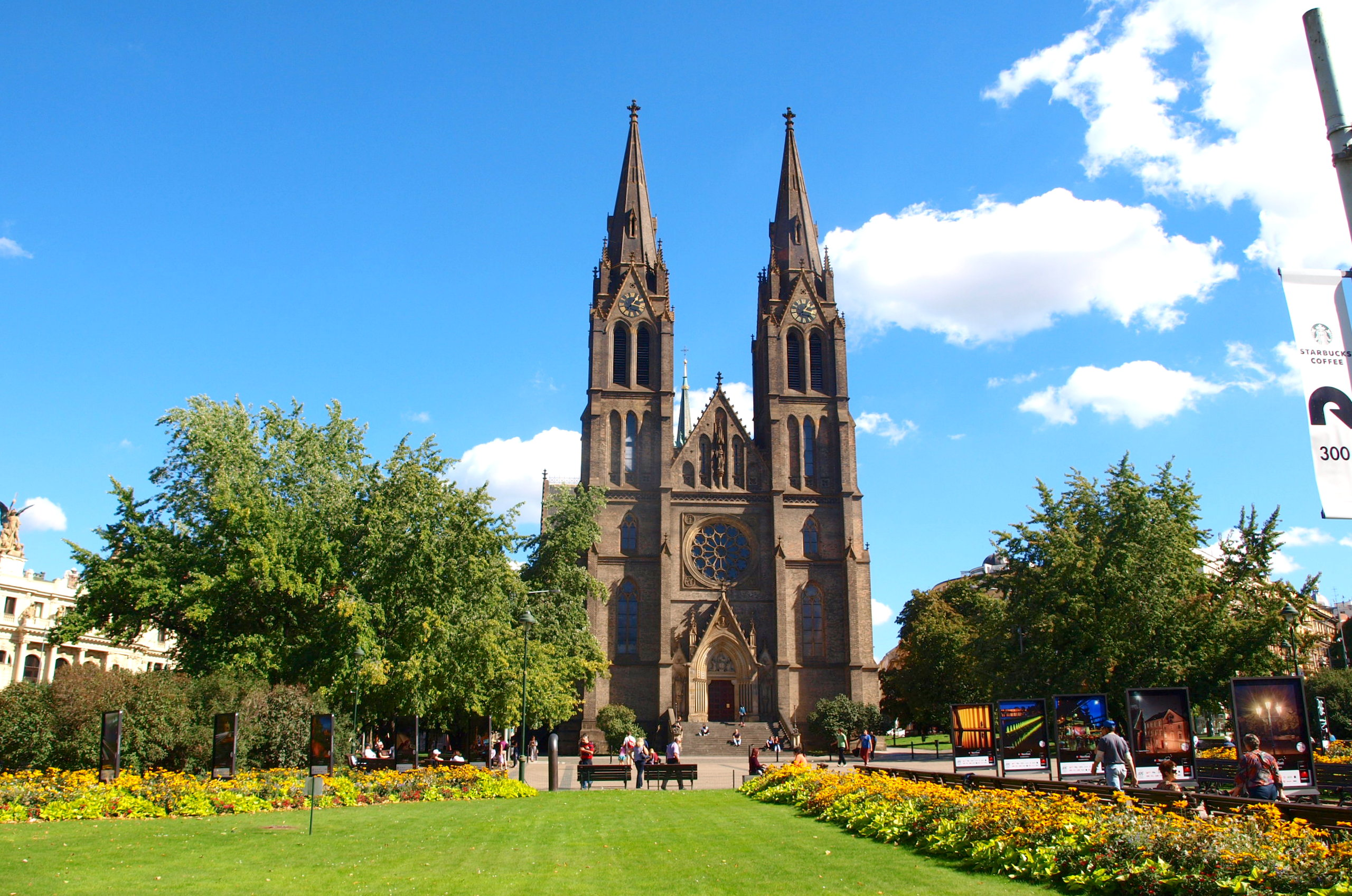
Church of Saint Ludmila

Mocker's first project was the reconstruction of St. Stephen's Cathedral in Vienna, on which he participated in 1864–1869. He became one of the most important Czech representatives of neo-Gothic architecture. He specialised in the restoration of monuments and was a supporter of the purist approach. He was the author of several publications on the issue of monument restoration.

Although he is appreciated for his work, which resulted in many characteristic neo-Gothic monuments, he is also criticised for deviation from the original character of the buildings and often ruthlessly eliminating new styles, even if they were valuable. His role model was the French architect Eugène Viollet-le-Duc, the author of the neo-Gothic reconstruction of Notre-Dame de Paris, who was also criticised for his work.

Today, the most appreciated of Mocker's works is the new building of the Basilica of Saint Ludmila in Prague and the reconstruction of the Old Town Bridge Tower in Prague. On the contrary, the most criticised work includes the reconstruction of Karlštejn Castle. Mocker's notable works include:

=== Reconstruction and restoration ===
- Cathedral of Saint Vitus in Prague Castle, Prague (1873–1899)
- Old Town Bridge Tower, Prague (1874–1878)
- Church of Saint Stephen, Prague-New Town (1874–1879)
- Church of Saint Peter in Poříčí, Prague-New Town (1874–1879)
- Powder Tower, Prague (1878–1886)
- Church of Saint Bartholomew, Kolín (1878–1910)
- Church Saint Henry and its belltower, Prague-New Town (1879)
- Karolinum, Prague-Old Town (1879–1881)
- Church Saint James the Great, Slavětín (1880–1881)
- Basilica of Saints Peter and Paul, Prague-Vyšehrad (1880–1903)
- Křivoklát Castle (1880s)
- Old New Synagogue, Prague-Josefov (1883)
- Karlštejn Castle (1887–1899)
- Konopiště Castle (1889–1894)

=== New buildings ===
- Basilica of Saint Ludmila, Prague-Vinohrady (1888–1893)
- Church of Saint Margaret, Zvole (1892–1894)
- Chapel of Saint Felix, Klenová (1897)
- Church of Saint Procopius, Prague-Žižkov (1898–1903)
