= Sázava (town) =

- Town
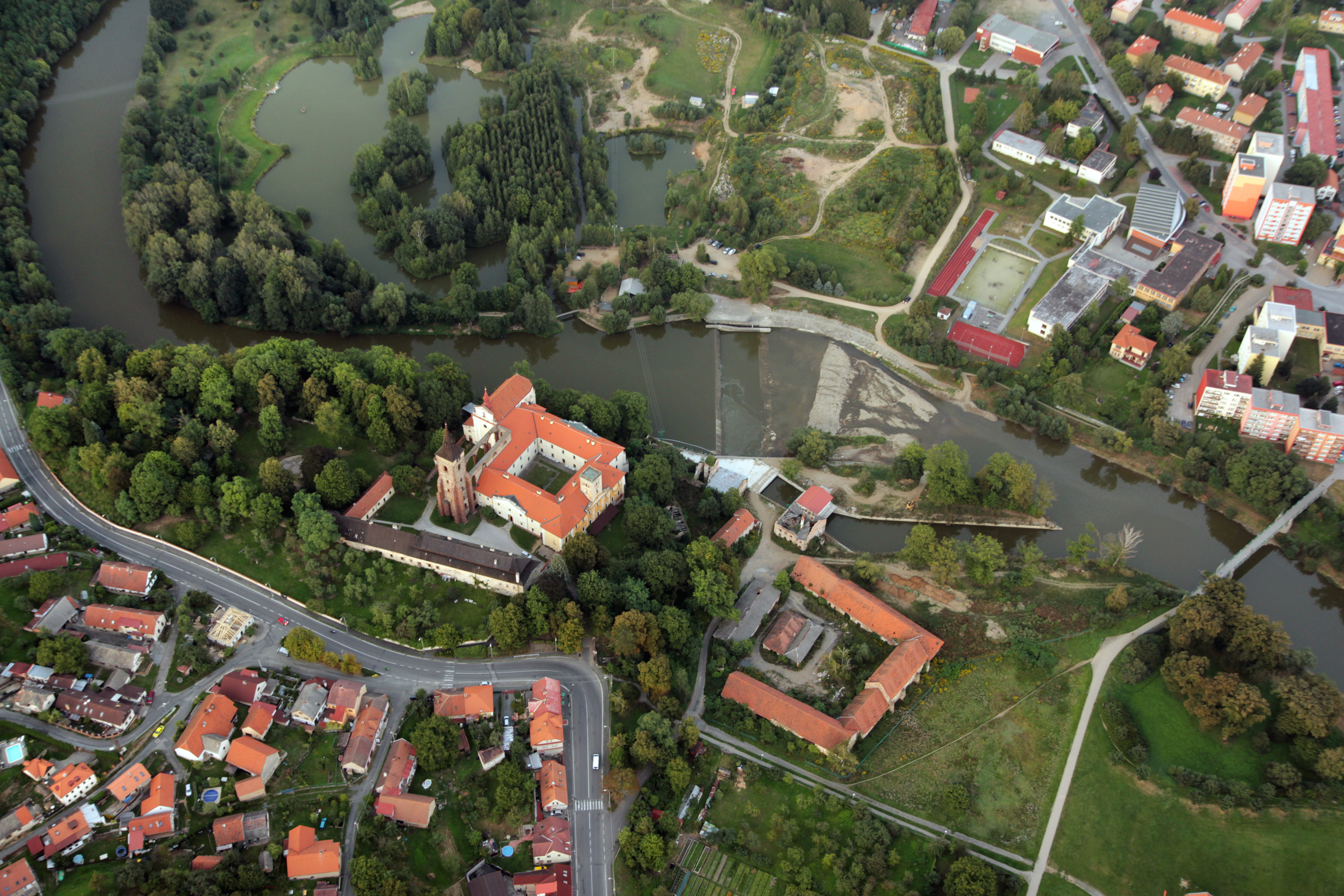
- Sázava River and Sázava Monastery

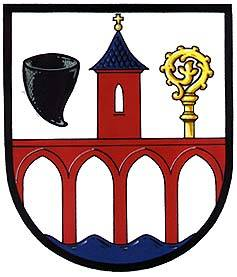
- Flag Coat of arms

- Location in the Czech Republic
- Coordinates: 49°52′18″N 14°53′48″E
- Country: Czech Republic
- Region: Central Bohemian
- District: Benešov
- First mentioned: 1053

Government
  - Mayor: Vladimír Dvořák

Area
  - Total: 20.48 km^{2} (7.91 sq mi)
- Elevation: 312 m (1,024 ft)

Population (2026-01-01)
  - Total: 3,906
  - Density: 190.7/km^{2} (494.0/sq mi)
- Time zone: UTC+1 (CET)
  - Summer (DST): UTC+2 (CEST)
- Postal code: 285 06
- Website: www.mestosazava.cz

Sázava (Czech pronunciation: [ˈsaːzava]; German: Sasau) is a town in Benešov District in the Central Bohemian Region of the Czech Republic. It has about 3,900 inhabitants. The town is located on the Sázava River and together with the Sázava Monastery, it was established in the 11th century. The monastery is the main landmark of the town, protected as a national cultural monument.

== Administrative division ==
Sázava consists of five municipal parts (in brackets population according to the 2021 census):

- Sázava (2,716)
- Bělokozly (102)
- Čeřenice (80)
- Černé Budy (762)
- Dojetřice (59)

== Etymology ==
The name was transferred to the settlement from the river Sázava.

== Geography ==
Sázava is located about 18 kilometres (11 mi) northeast of Benešov and 34 km (21 mi) southeast of Prague. It lies is a hilly landscape, the eastern part of the municipal territory belongs to the Benešov Uplands and the western part belongs to the Vlašim Uplands. Most of the built-up area is situated around bends of the Sázava River.

== History ==
The settlement was founded around the Sázava Monastery, established in 1032 and destroyed in the Hussite Wars in 1421. Near the monastery was founded the village of Černé Budy, which is as old as the town proper. The first written mention of Sázava and Černé Budy is from 1053.

== Demographics ==
Historical population

Year	Pop.	±%
1869	1,862	—
1880	1,927	+3.5%
1890	1,819	−5.6%
1900	1,949	+7.1%
1910	1,754	−10.0%

Year	Pop.	±%
1921	1,741	−0.7%
1930	1,922	+10.4%
1950	1,978	+2.9%
1961	2,285	+15.5%
1970	2,780	+21.7%

Year	Pop.	±%
1980	3,637	+30.8%
1991	3,688	+1.4%
2001	3,728	+1.1%
2011	3,764	+1.0%
2021	3,719	−1.2%

Source: Censuses

== Economy ==
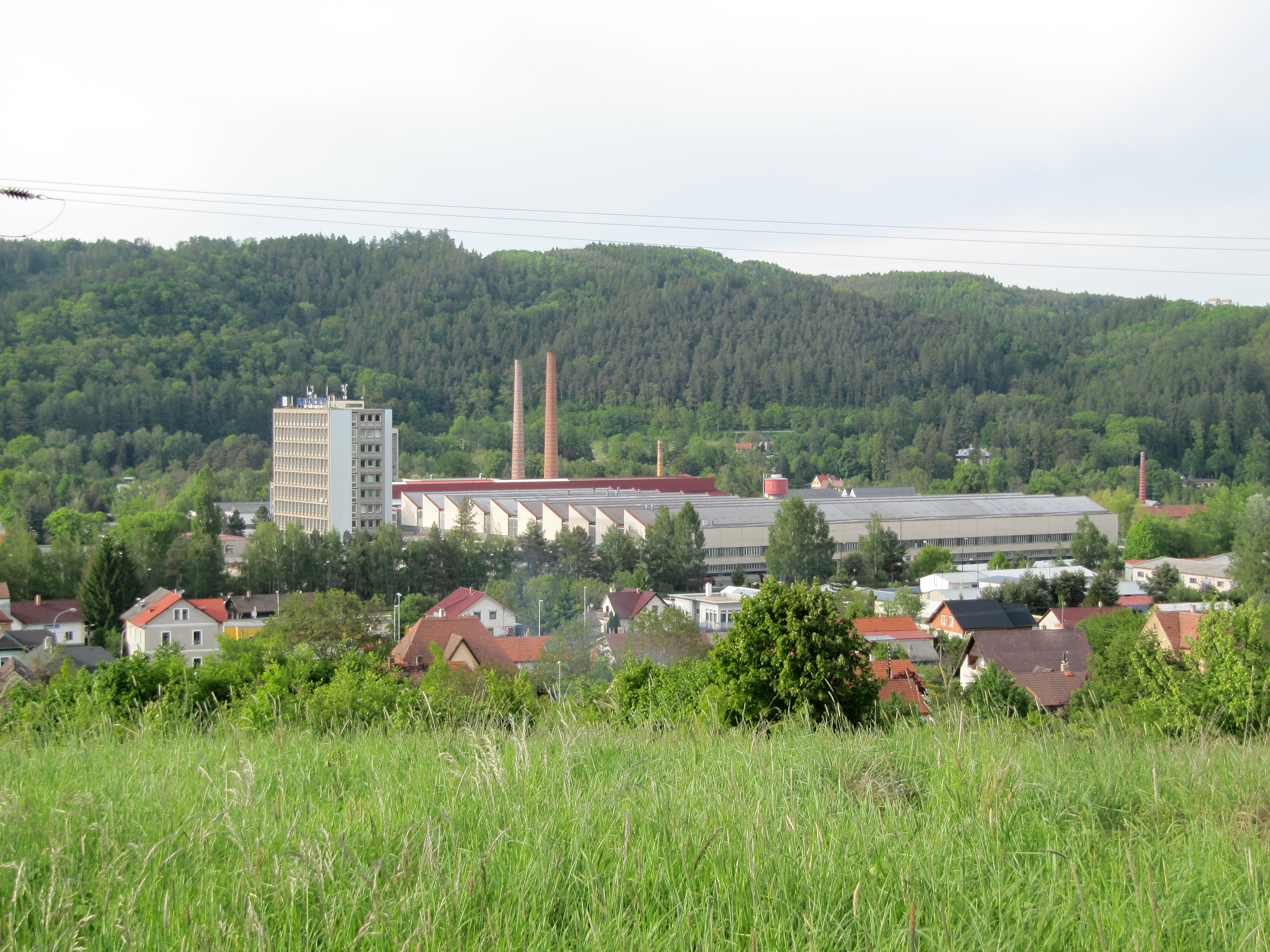
Glass factory

The eastern side of the town, on the left bank of the Sázava River, has a predominantly industrial character. It includes Kavalierglass, a glass manufacturer plant. It was established in 1837 by Franz Kavalier, however, the original smelter has not been preserved.

== Transport ==
The town is located on the railway line from Zruč nad Sázavou to Čerčany and is served by four train stations and stops: Sázava, Sázava zastávka, Samopše and Plužiny.

== Sights ==
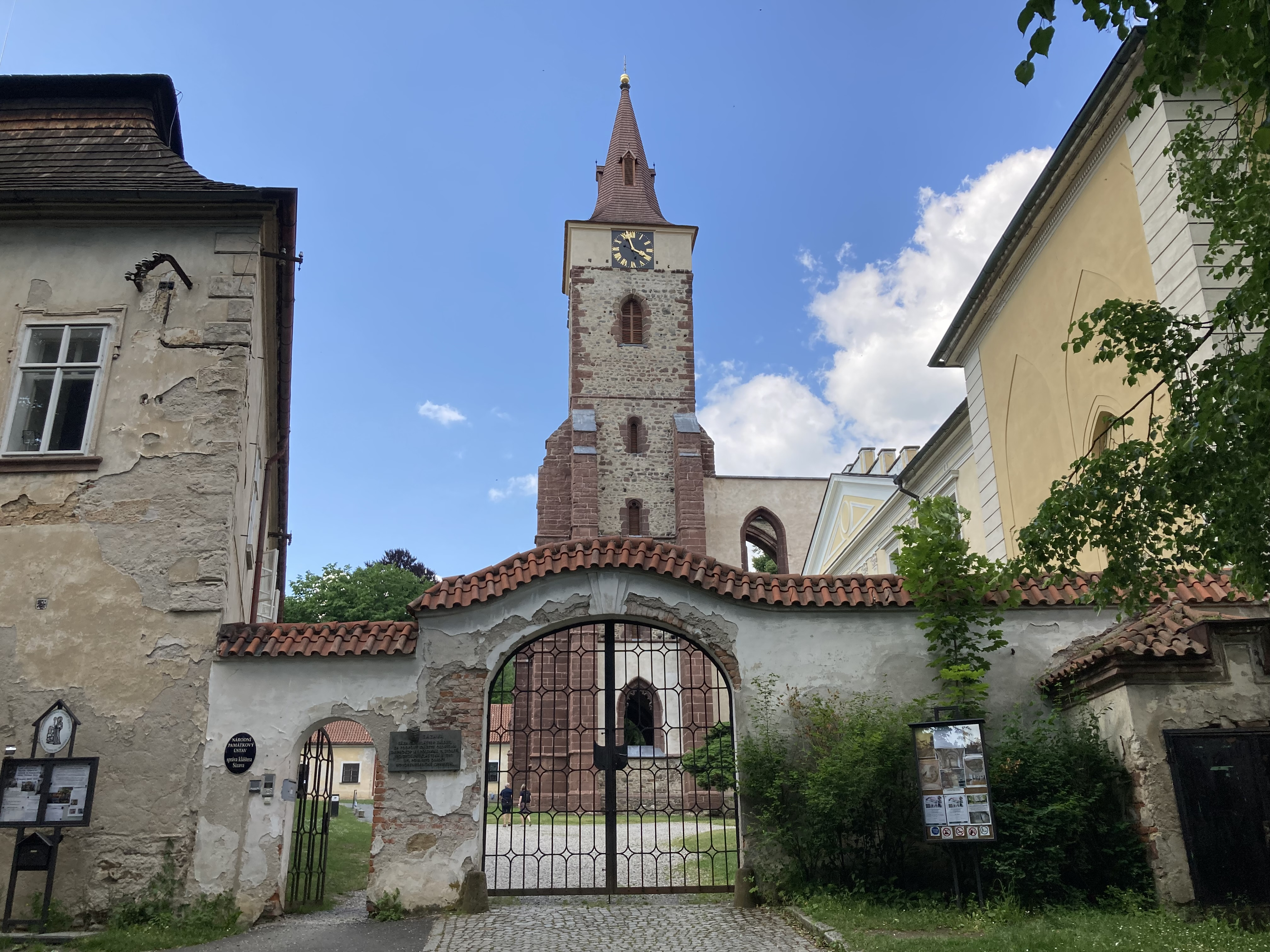
Entrance to the monastery

The main landmark is the former Sázava Monastery. Today it is managed by the National Heritage Institute and open to the public. It is protected as a national cultural monument. The monastery complex includes the Church of Saint Procopius.

== In popular culture ==
Sázava has appeared under the name Sasau as one of the accessible towns in the 2018 video game Kingdom Come: Deliverance.

== Notable people ==
- Otomar Korbelář (1899–1976), actor
- George Voskovec (1905–1981), Czech-American actor and writer
