= Karel Škréta =

Czech painter (1610–1674)

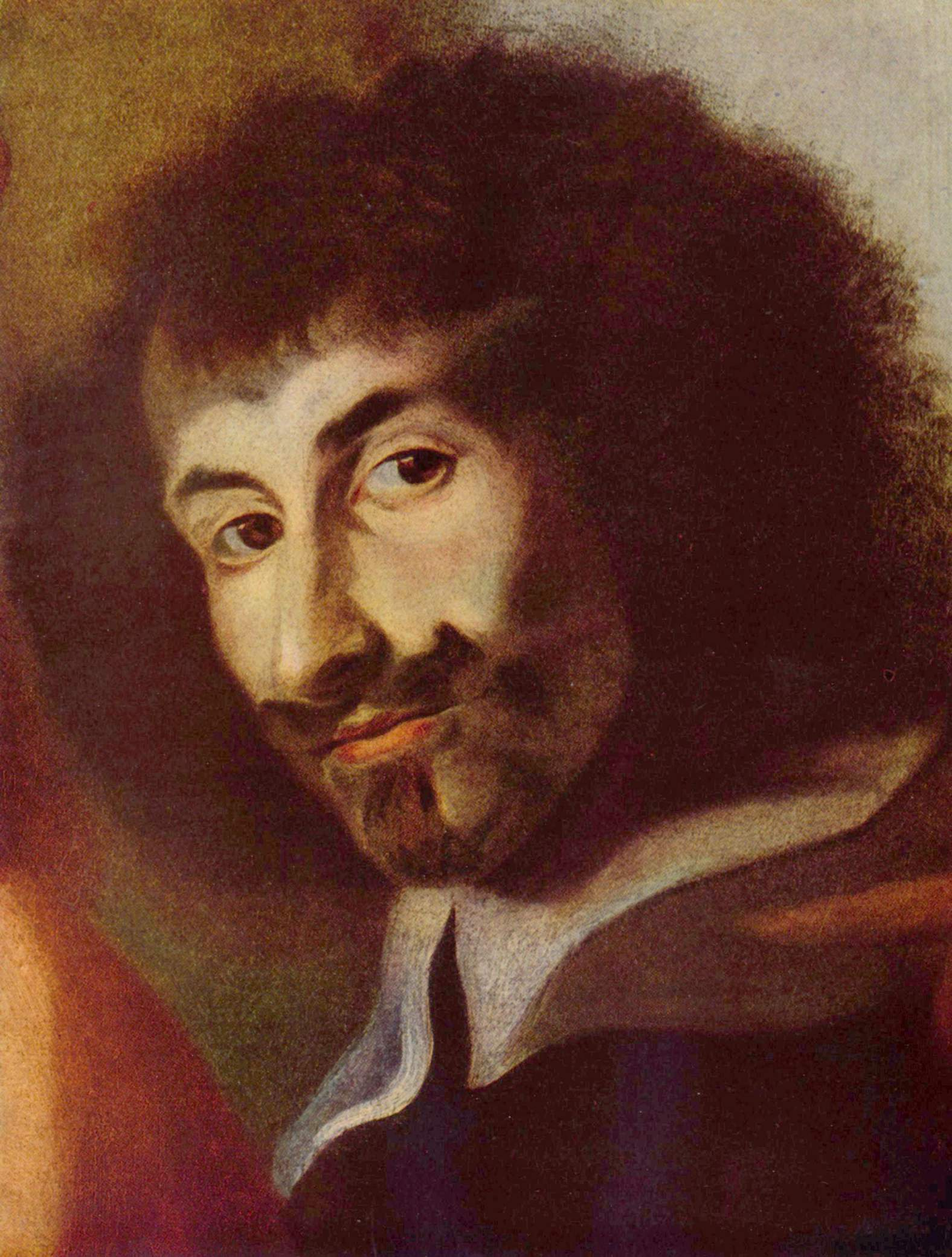
- Self portrait (1647)
- Born: Karel Škréta Šotnovský ze Závořic; 1610; Prague, Bohemia
- Died: 30 July 1674 (aged 63–64); Prague, Bohemia
- Known for: Painting
- Notable work: Saint Martin dividing his cloak with a beggar (1645)
- Movement: Baroque

Karel Škréta Šotnovský of Závořice (Czech: Karel Škréta Šotnovský ze Závořic; 1610 – 30 July 1674) was a Czech painter who worked in the Baroque style. He was mostly a portrait painter and painter of altarpieces. He lived through the Thirty Years' War which caused him some hardships as a Protestant which led him to leave Prague for Saxony and then Italy.

== Biography ==
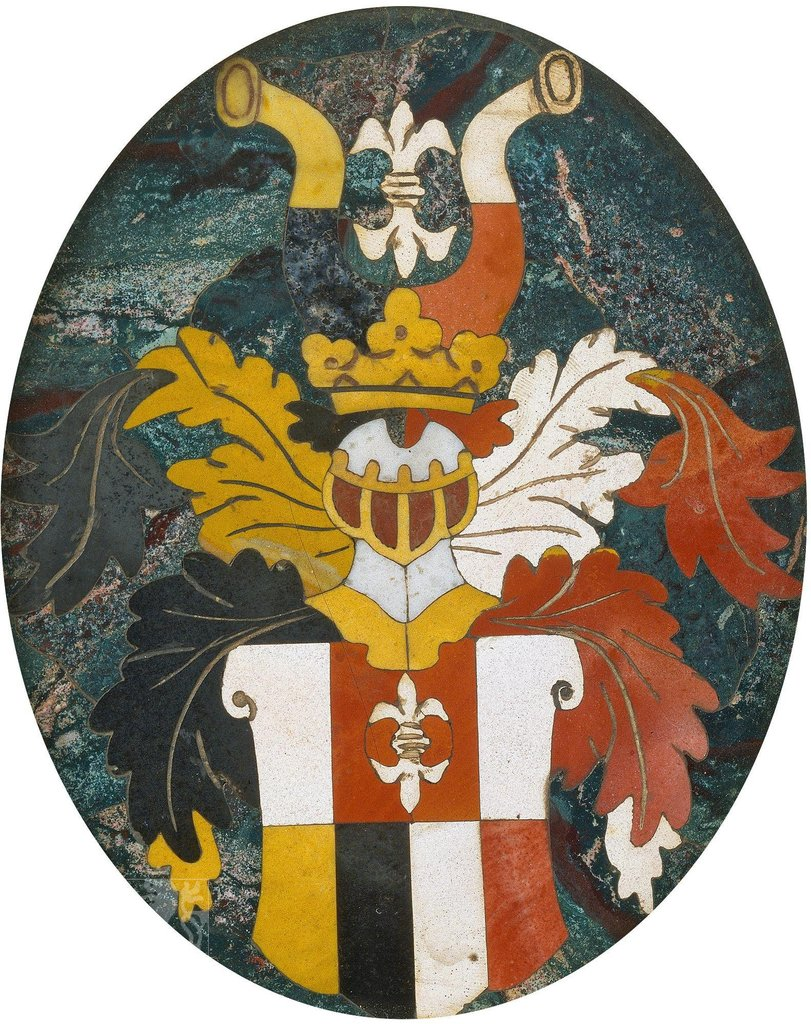
Šotnovský family arms

He was born to a Protestant Bohemian noble family that originally operated mills in South Bohemia, but moved to Kutná Hora, then to Prague, where they occupied several official positions. His father died when he was only three, and he was commended to the care of the local schools, where he received a thorough classical education. It is uncertain where he learned painting, although he probably studied at the Royal Court, where he would have worked with Aegidius Sadeler.

During this time, the Thirty Years' War had begun and Prague was taken by Catholic forces. Protestants were tolerated at first, but a major conversion effort was initiated in 1627 and, the following year, he fled with his mother to Saxony. He eventually made his way to Italy, spent a few years in Venice studying the works of Veronese, Tintoretto and Titian, then went to Rome in 1634. While there, he joined the Bentvueghels (a Dutch painters' association) under the pseudonym "Slagzwaart" (Broadsword).

By this time, he had already established himself as a portrait painter. After about a year he went back to Saxony and finally returned to Prague in 1638, where he converted to Catholicism and sued to regain his property; possibly with the assistance of an influential Jesuit, as he had begun to accept commissions from that order. He opened a studio in 1645 and joined the artists' guild, serving as its chairman from 1651 to 1661.

In addition to his portraits, he painted altarpieces and other decorations at several churches, including the Church of Our Lady before Týn, the Church of Saint Procopius, Žižkov and St. Wenceslas Church in Zderaz. Numerous streets have been named after him; in Prague-Vinohrady, Brno, Ostrava, Olomouc, Ústí nad Labem, Jihlava, Česká Lípa, Litoměřice, Vysoké Mýto, Hořice, Lysá nad Labem, Řevnice, Žatec and Plzeň.

He is also the subject of two theatrical works (both called Karel Škréta). The first is a comedy, written in 1841 by Václav Alois Svoboda. The second is a comic opera, based on Svoboda's play, written in 1883 by Karel Bendl, to a libretto by Eliška Krásnohorská. Although his art plays a role in the plots (especially at the climax), they feature romantic and political intrigues that end in murder.

== Selected paintings ==
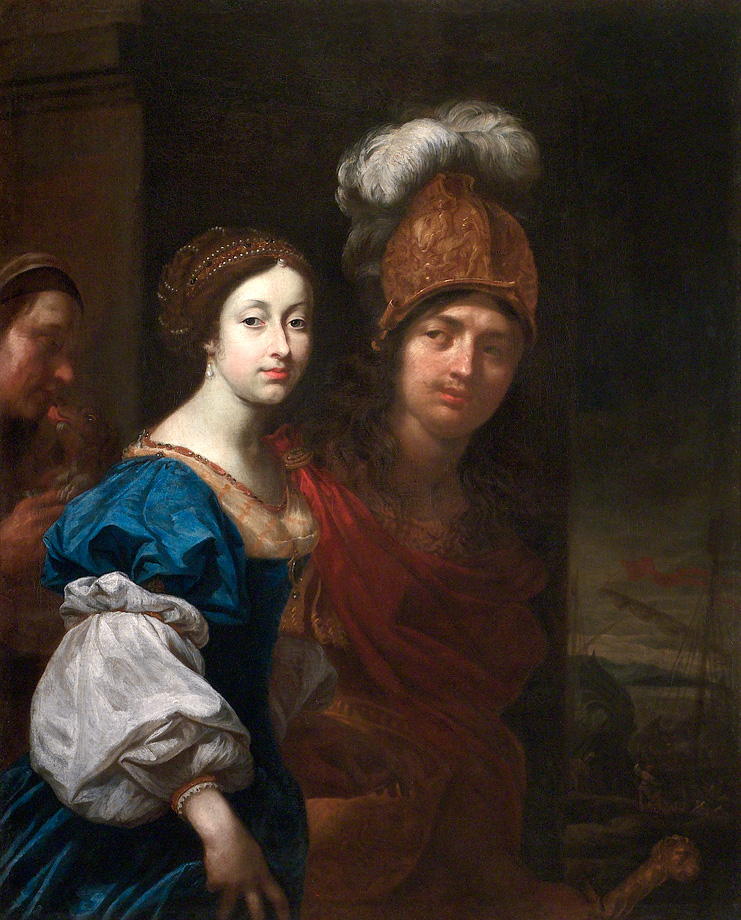
Paris and Helen

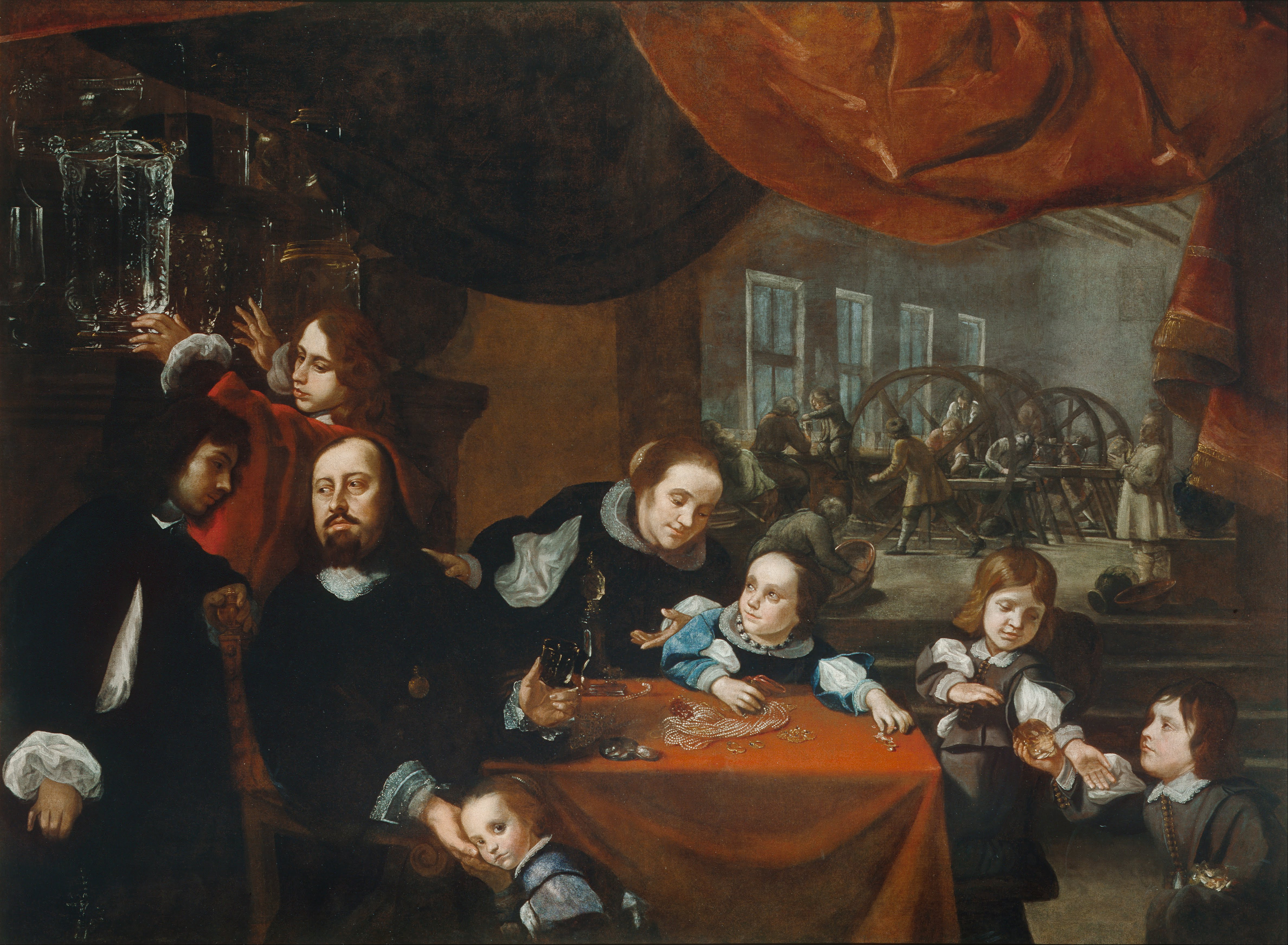
The Stonecutter Dionysio Miseroni
and His Family

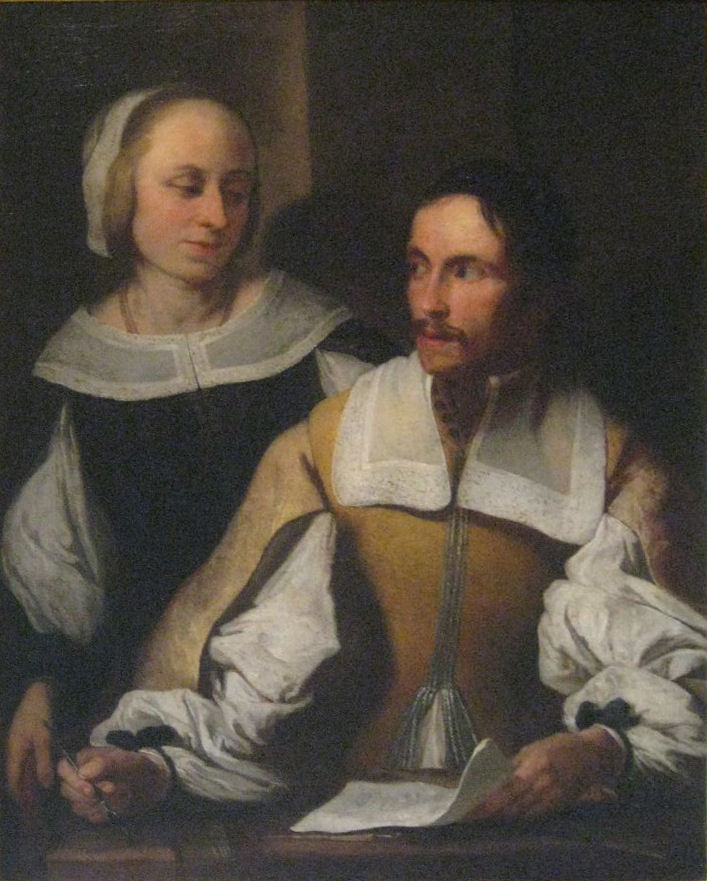
The Mathematician
and His Wife

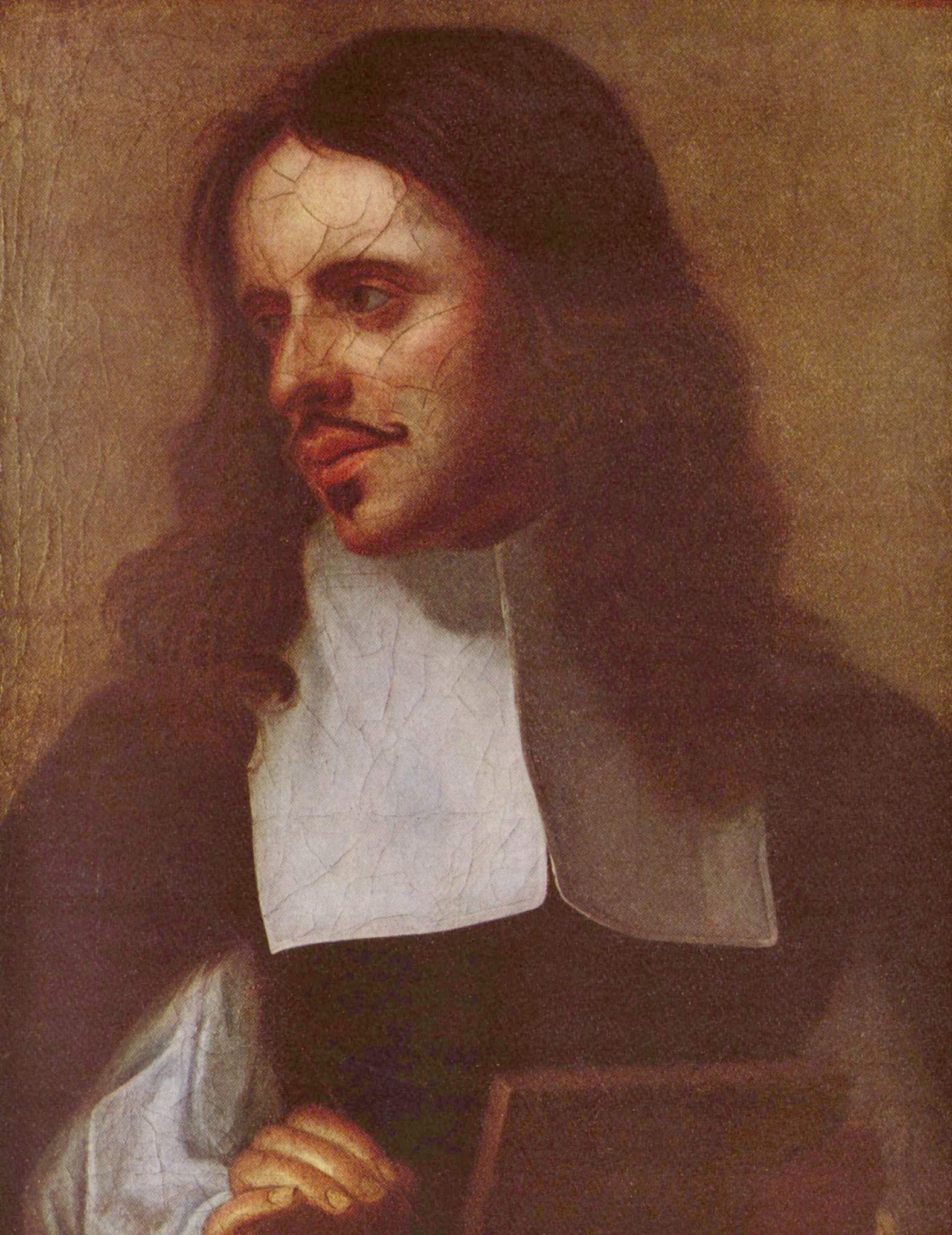
Portrait of a Miniaturist (Joachim von Sandrart?)

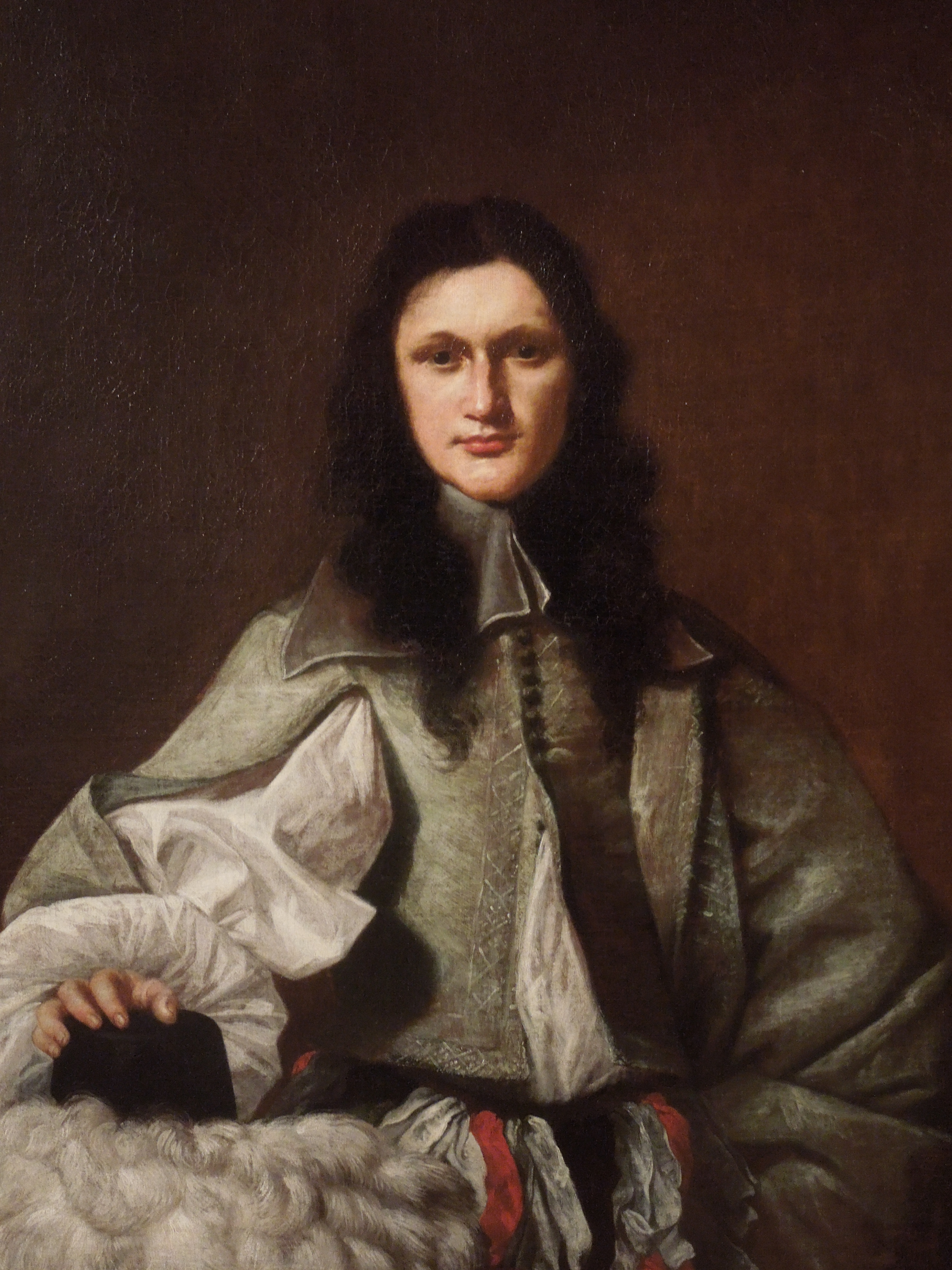
Ignác Jetřich Vitanovský of Vlčkovice
