= Václav Jan Kopřiva =

- Born: 8 February 1708; Brloh, Austria-Hungary
- Died: 7 June 1789 (aged 81); Cítoliby, Austria-Hungary
- Occupations: Organist; Composer
- Children: Karel Blažej Kopřiva; Jan Jáchym Kopřiva

Václav Jan Kopřiva (pseudonym Urtica) (8 February 1708 – 7 June 1789) was a Bohemian composer and organist.

== Life ==
Kopřiva was a son of the miller Václav Kopřiva (1672–?), from the neighboring village Brloh (now part of Louny), and his wife Juditka Rozumová (1677–?). He received his first musical education from his godfather Martin Antonín Kalina, who was a cantor and a representative of another important music family in Cítoliby. He completed his studies in Prague, becoming an organist at the Crusaders' Church and studying with Franz Joseph Dollhopf.

Thereafter he worked as a cantor and organist in Cítoliby. With his wife Terézia, he had two sons Karel Blažej Kopřiva and Jan Jáchym Kopřiva, who both also became composers. His spiritual compositions have typical Baroque characteristics and they employ pastoral poems and folksongs. His notable pupils include Jan Nepomuk Vent, Jan Adam Galina, Jakub Lokaj and both of his sons.

== List of works ==
- Alma Redemptoris Mater, for soprano, alto, women choir, strings and organ
- Litaniae Lauretanae, for SATB, mixed choir, orchestra and organ
  1. Kyrie
  2. Pater de coelis
  3. Sancta Trinitas
  4. Sancta Maria
  5. Mater Christi
  6. Virgo prudentissima
  7. Vas spirituale
  8. Salus infirmorum
  9. Regina angelorum
- Missa pastoralis in D
- Missu brevis in C
- Offertorium pastorale in D "Hodie Christus natus est...", for soprano, mixed choir and chamber orchestra
- Offertorium pastorale in A "Huc, huc ad regem pastorum", for soprano, mixed choir, orchestra and organ
- Offertorium in D groot "Te Trinitas beata", for choir, orchestra and organ
- Offertorium ex D "Vox clamantis in deserto", for soprano, mixed choir, orchestra and organ
- Offertorium es D de sancto Joanne Baptista "Vox clemantis in deserto", for soprano, mixed choir, orchestra and organ
- Rorate coeli ex F, cantata for alto, tenor, mixed choir, strings and organ

== Sources ==
- Dutch Wikipedia article
