= Cítoliby =

- Market town
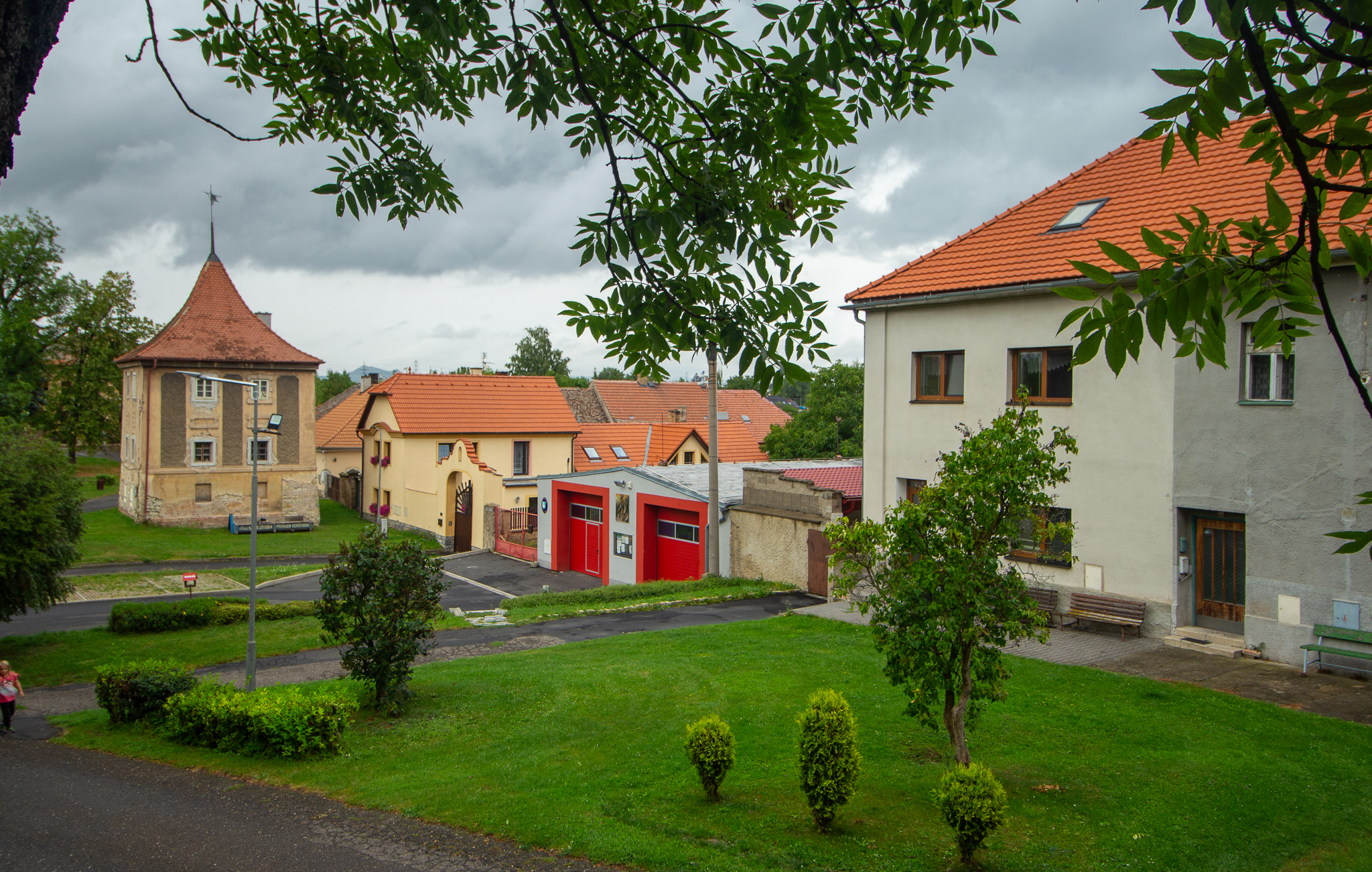
- Centre of Cítoliby with the waterworks

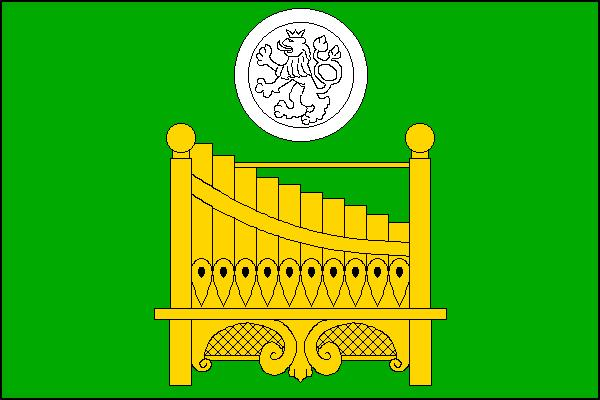
- Flag Coat of arms

- Location in the Czech Republic
- Coordinates: 50°19′58″N 13°48′44″E
- Country: Czech Republic
- Region: Ústí nad Labem
- District: Louny
- First mentioned: 1325

Area
  - Total: 6.82 km^{2} (2.63 sq mi)
- Elevation: 236 m (774 ft)

Population (2026-01-01)
  - Total: 1,093
  - Density: 160/km^{2} (415/sq mi)
- Time zone: UTC+1 (CET)
  - Summer (DST): UTC+2 (CEST)
- Postal code: 439 02
- Website: www.obec-citoliby.cz

Cítoliby (Czech pronunciation: [ˈtsiːtolɪbɪ]; until 1923 Citoliby; German: Zittolib) is a market town in Louny District in the Ústí nad Labem Region of the Czech Republic. It has about 1,100 inhabitants.

== Etymology ==
The name is derived from the Old Czech words cěta (i.e. 'small coin') and ľubiti ('to like'). The lokator of the village was probably someone who liked money.

== Geography ==
Cítoliby is located about 2 kilometres (1 mi) south of Louny and 40 km (25 mi) southwest of Ústí nad Labem. It lies in an agricultural landscape in the Lower Ohře Table.

== History ==
The first written mention of Cítoliby is from 1325, when it was a royal property. The owners often changed and included various lower noble families. From 1570 to 1630, the Cítoliby estate was a property of the Hruška family, who first expanded the estate significantly, but then part of it was confiscated from them as a result of the Battle of White Mountain. During the Thirty Years' War, Cítoliby was looted repeatedly. In 1698, the almost entire village burned down.

The last aristocratic owners of Cítoliby before the establishment of an independent municipality was the Schwarzenberg family, which acquired it in 1803. In 1873, Cítoliby was promoted to a market town.

== Demographics ==
Historical population

Year	Pop.	±%
1869	900	—
1880	991	+10.1%
1890	1,025	+3.4%
1900	1,235	+20.5%
1910	1,358	+10.0%

Year	Pop.	±%
1921	1,325	−2.4%
1930	1,305	−1.5%
1950	1,084	−16.9%
1961	1,060	−2.2%
1970	982	−7.4%

Year	Pop.	±%
1980	994	+1.2%
1991	918	−7.6%
2001	955	+4.0%
2011	1,074	+12.5%
2021	1,022	−4.8%

Source: Censuses

== Transport ==
The D7 motorway from Prague to Chomutov runs through the municipal territory.

== Sights ==
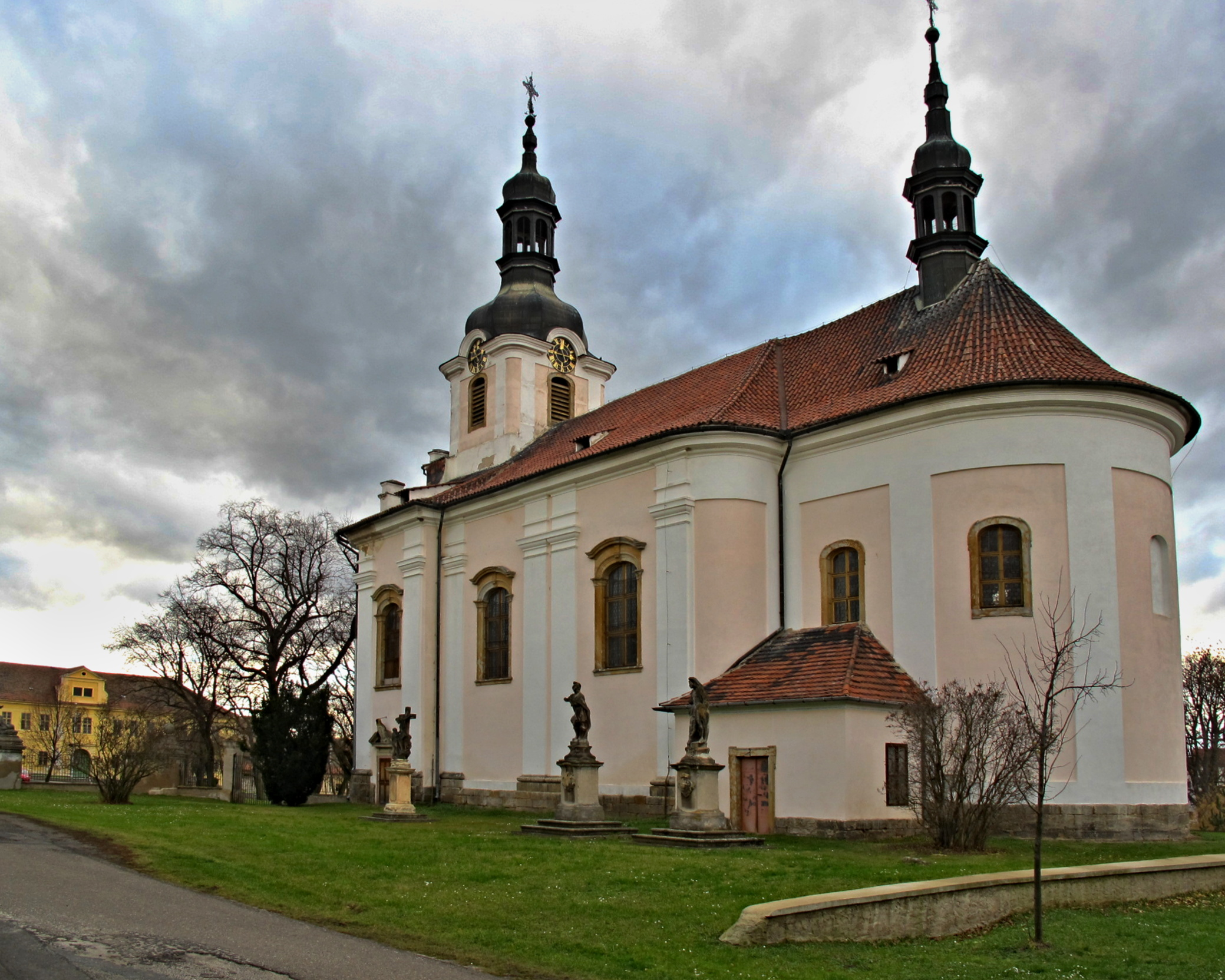
Church of Saint James the Great; Cítoliby Castle in the background

Among the main landmarks of Cítoliby is the castle and the church. The Church of Saint James the Great was built in the Baroque style in 1713–1715.

The Cítoliby Castle was built in 1665 and rebuilt in the Baroque style before 1717. The castle is privately owned and used for cultural purposes. It has been undergoing renovation since 2026.

A technical monument is the former waterworks. It was built before 1727 for the needs of the castle water supply and probably rebuilt in 1885. This solitary building is also a landmark of the town square.

== Notable people ==
- Václav Jan Kopřiva (1708–1789), composer and organist
- Karel Blažej Kopřiva (1756–1785), composer and organist
- Josef Mocker (1835–1899), architect and restorer
