= Karel Blažej Kopřiva =

Czech organist and composer (1756–1785)

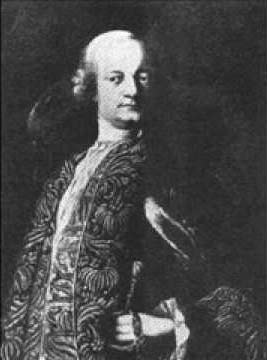
- Born: 9 February 1756; Cítoliby
- Died: 15 May 1785 (aged 29); Cítoliby
- Occupations: Organist; Composer
- Parent: Václav Jan Kopřiva

Karel Blažej Kopřiva (or Karl Blasius Kopřiva; 9 February 1756 – 15 May 1785) was a Czech organist and composer. He came from a family of musicians.

== Life and career ==
Kopřiva was born on 9 February 1756 in Cítoliby, Bohemia. He studied first with his father, the composer Václav Jan Kopřiva (1708–1789), and later with Josef Seger in Prague. Then he became organist at the Church of St. James the Great in Cítoliby. He is especially renowned for his numerous concertos and fairs.

His brother Jan Jáchym Kopřiva (1754–1792) was also a notable musician.

He died on 15 May 1785 in Cítoliby.

== List of selected works ==
- 12 symphonies (lost)
- 8 organ concertos (one survived)
- Missa Solemnis in Dis
- Requiem in C
- Motetti: Dictamina mea (in Dis), Gloria Deo (in D), Veni sponsa Christi (in D)
- Offertorium O, magna coeli Domina (in C)
- Arias: Ah, cordi trito (in Dis), Amoenitate vocum (in D), Quod pia voce cano (in Dis), Siste ultricem dexteram (in B)

=== Solo organ works (complete) ===
- Prelude in C major
- Fugue-pastorella in C major
- Fugue in A flat major
- Fugue in F minor
- Fughetta after Handel in G major
- Fuga supra cognomen DEBEFE in D minor
- Fugue in A minor
