= Flora (Prague Metro) =

Prague metro station

Coordinates: 50°4′39.47″N 14°27′40.45″E

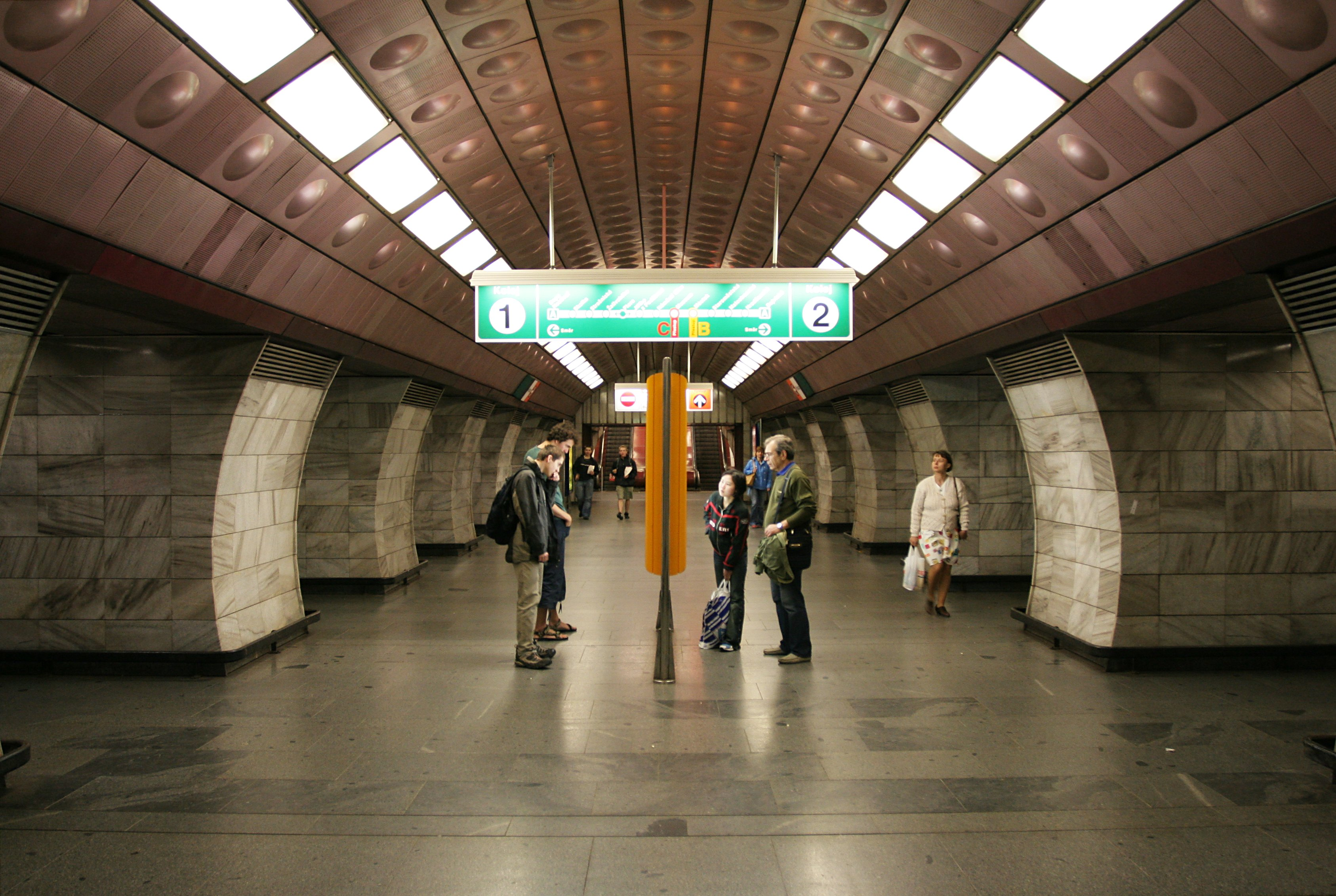

General information
- Location: Prague 3 Prague; Czech Republic
- System: Prague Metro
- Platforms: 1 island platform
- Tracks: 2

Construction
- Structure type: Underground
- Depth: 254 m (833 ft)

History
- Opened: 19 December 1980; 45 years ago
- Closed: 2 February 2026 (reconstruction)

Services
Preceding station	Prague Metro	Following station
Jiřího z Poděbrad toward Nemocnice Motol	Line A	Želivského toward Depo Hostivař
Location

Flora (Czech pronunciation: [ˈflo:ra]) is a Prague Metro station on Line A. It is located under the shopping mall Atrium Flora, on the border of the Vinohrady and Žižkov districts near the Olšany Cemetery. The station was opened on 19 December 1980 as part of the extension of the line between Náměstí Míru and Želivského.

== Characteristics ==
Flora is a three-bore station with a short, 33 meter middle tunnel, 6 pairs of boarding zones and prefabricated, cast-iron panels on the station walls. It is 108 meters long and only 26 meters deep, making it one of the shallowest stations on the entire line. From the middle bore, an exit escalator goes through a tunnel to an underground vestibule (4.75 meters underground), which is attached to the shopping mall Palác Flora (2003). One can access Palác Flora by going through the immediate right exit after going up the escalator. There are six more exits from the vestibule to the street. The station is covered in gold and wine-colored die-cast aluminum panels, and also with decorative gray stone. Construction of the station cost 254 million Czechoslovak crowns.

== Station reconstruction ==
On 2 February 2026, the station was closed on a reconstruction. During the reconstruction, it is planned to replace the escalators, install modern fire extinguishing systems, and repair the ceiling leaks. The planned duration of the works is 10 months.

== Gallery ==
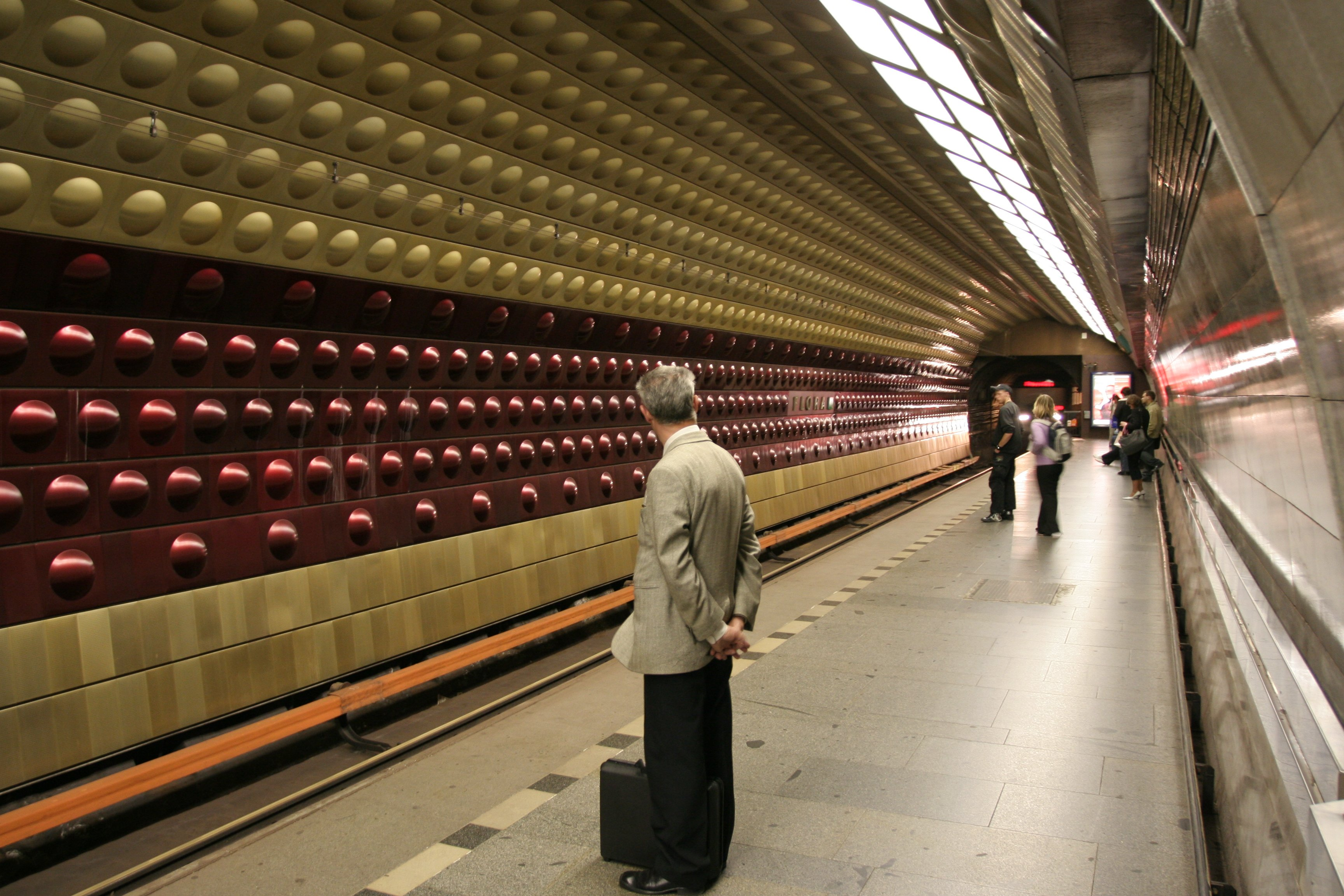
Platform

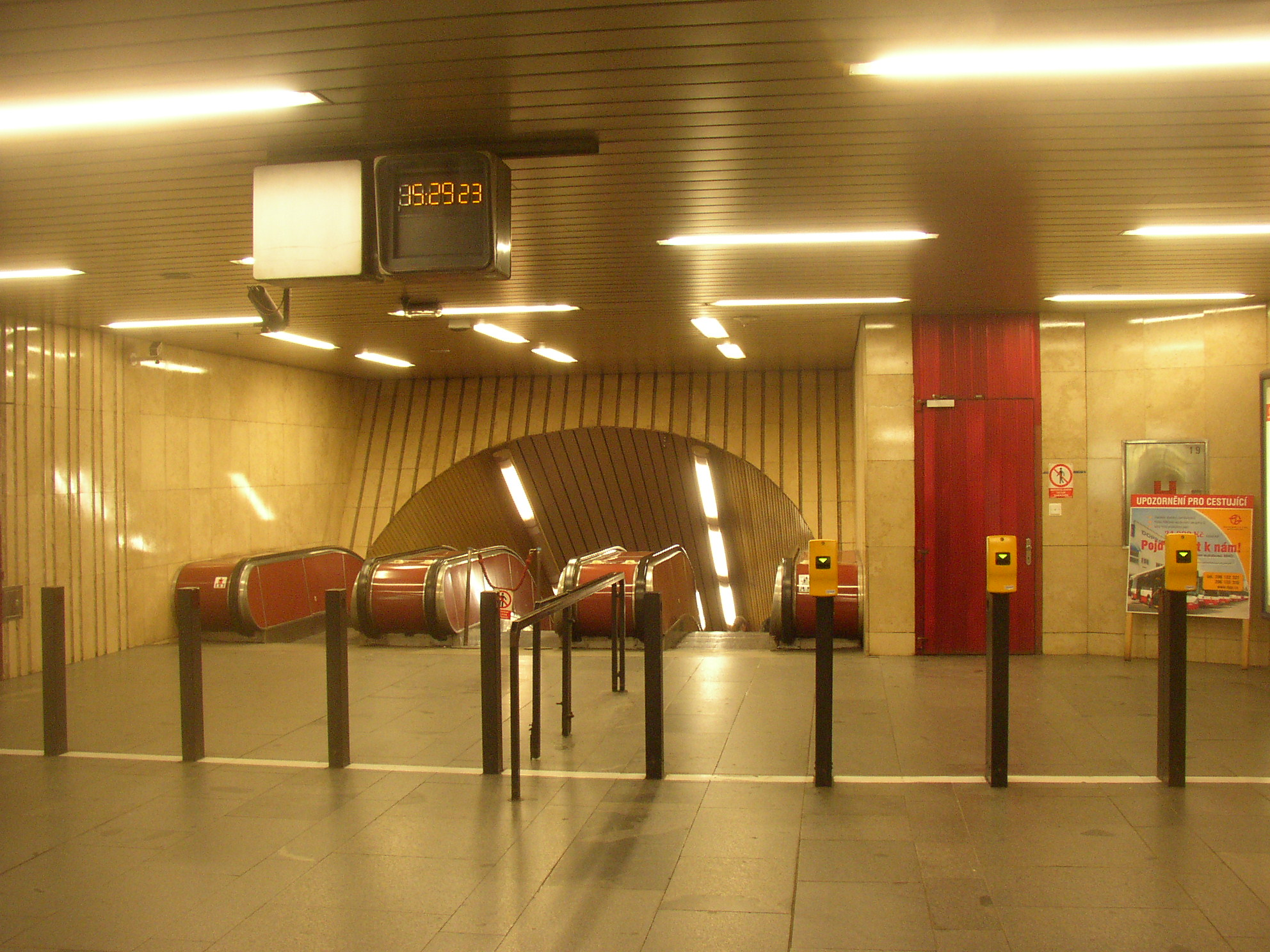
Upper end of the escalator tunnel
