= Parukářka Park =

Park in Prague, Czech Republic

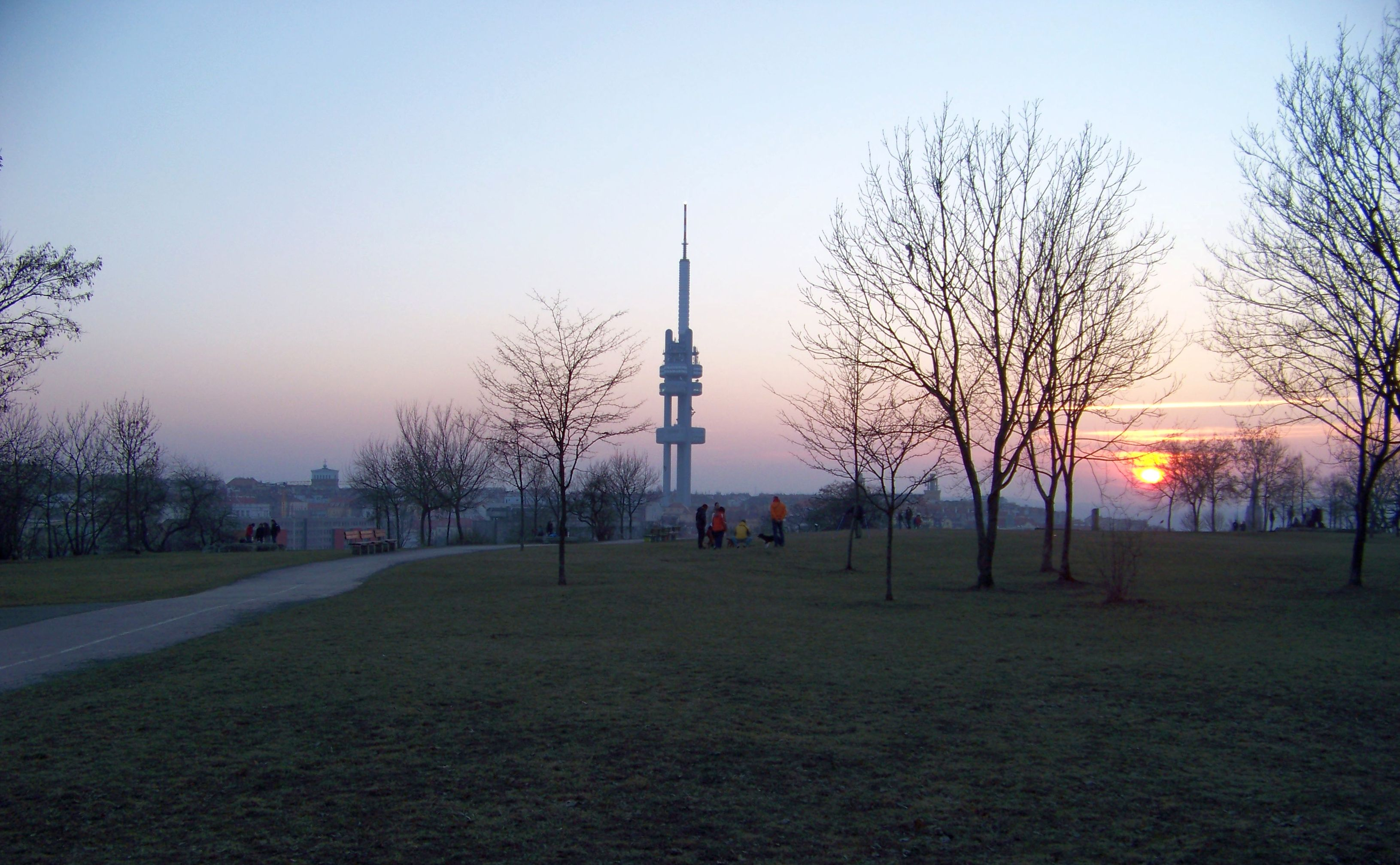
- The park in 2011
- Interactive map of Parukářka Park
- Location: Prague, Czech Republic
- Coordinates: 50°5′5.11″N 14°27′41.86″E

Parukářka Park is a park located on the Hill of saint Cross in Žižkov, Prague, Czech Republic.
