= Žižkov =

Cadastral district of Prague, Czech Republic

- Cadastral district of Prague
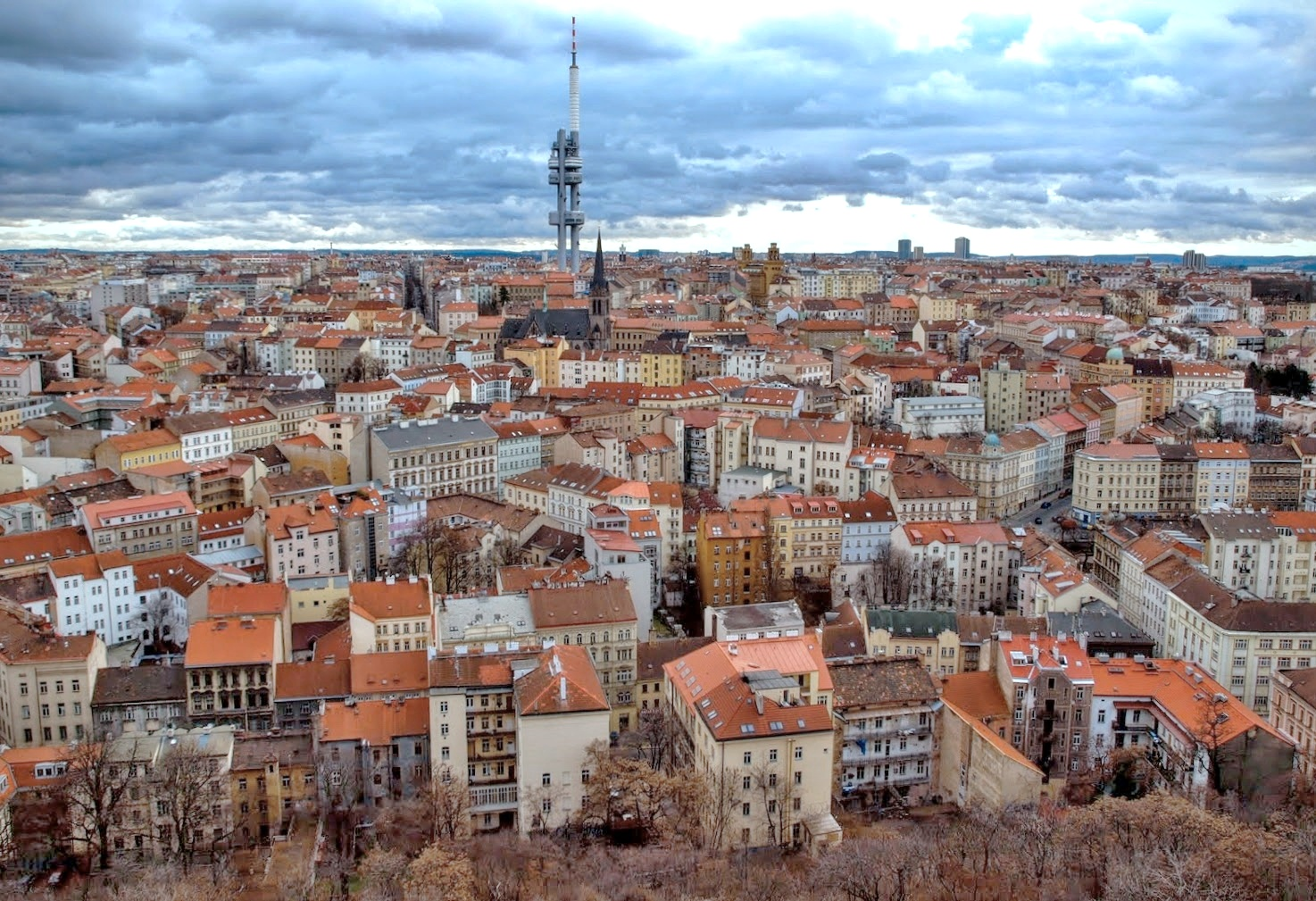
- Žižkov as seen from Vítkov hill, with Žižkov Television Tower

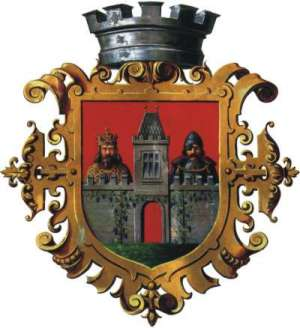
- Coat of arms

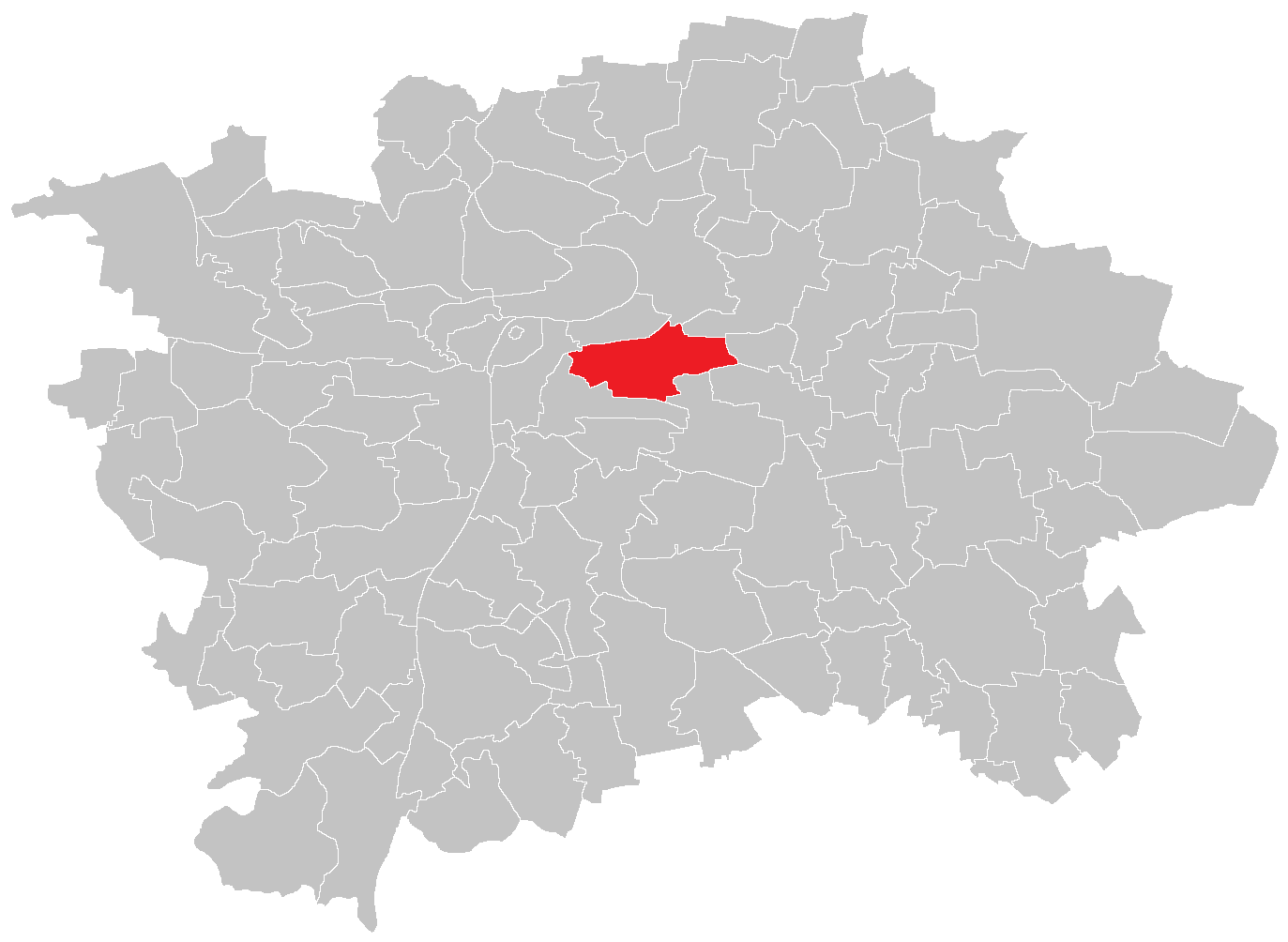
- Location of Žižkov within Prague
- Coordinates: 50°05′07″N 14°28′17″E
- Country: Czech Republic
- City: Prague
- District: Prague 3, Prague 8, Prague 10
- Incorporated into Prague: 1922

Area
  - Total: 5.44 km^{2} (2.10 sq mi)

Population (2021)
  - Total: 58,267
  - Density: 10,700/km^{2} (27,700/sq mi)
- Postal code: 130 00, 100 00

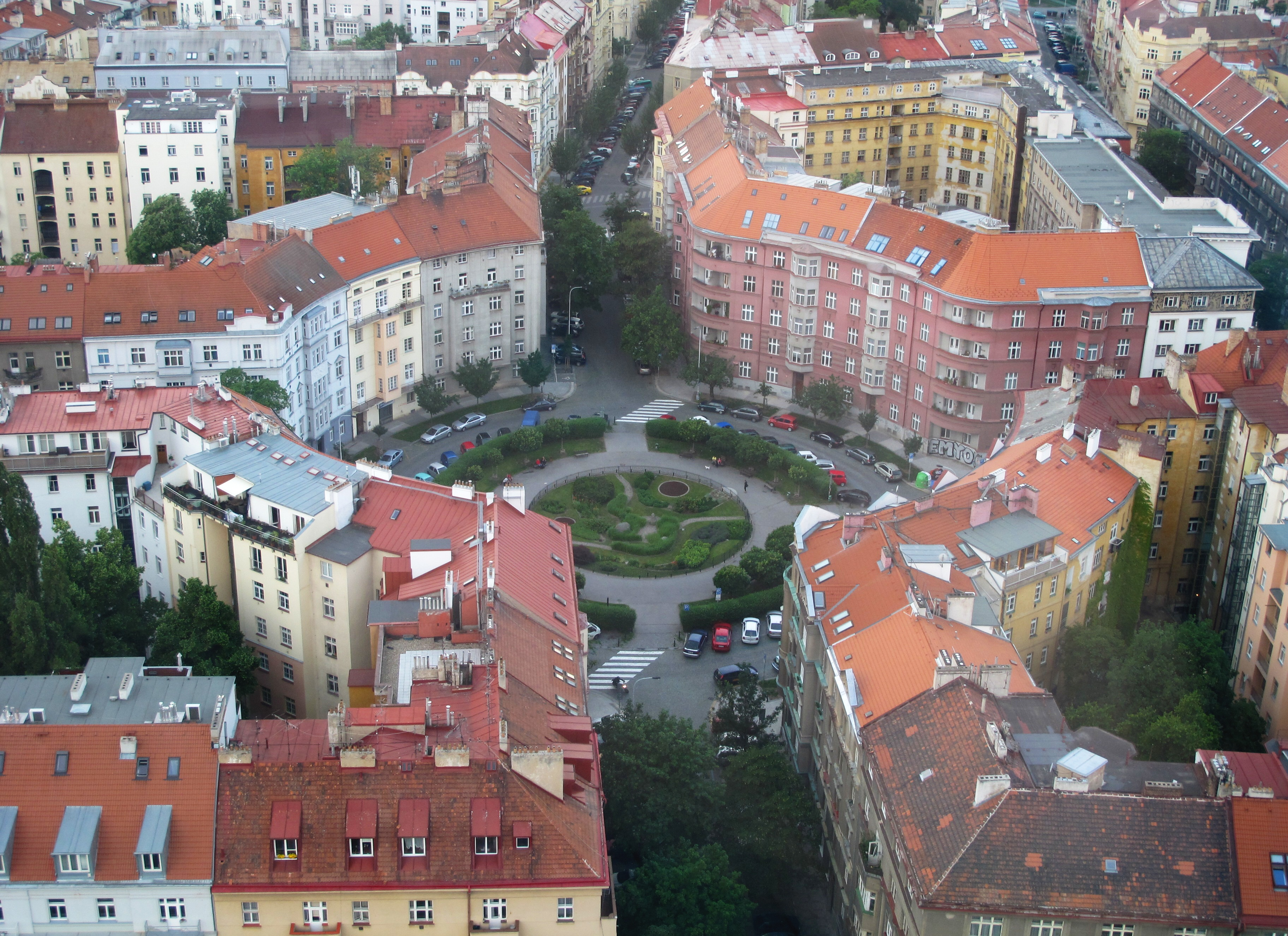
Škroupovo náměstí

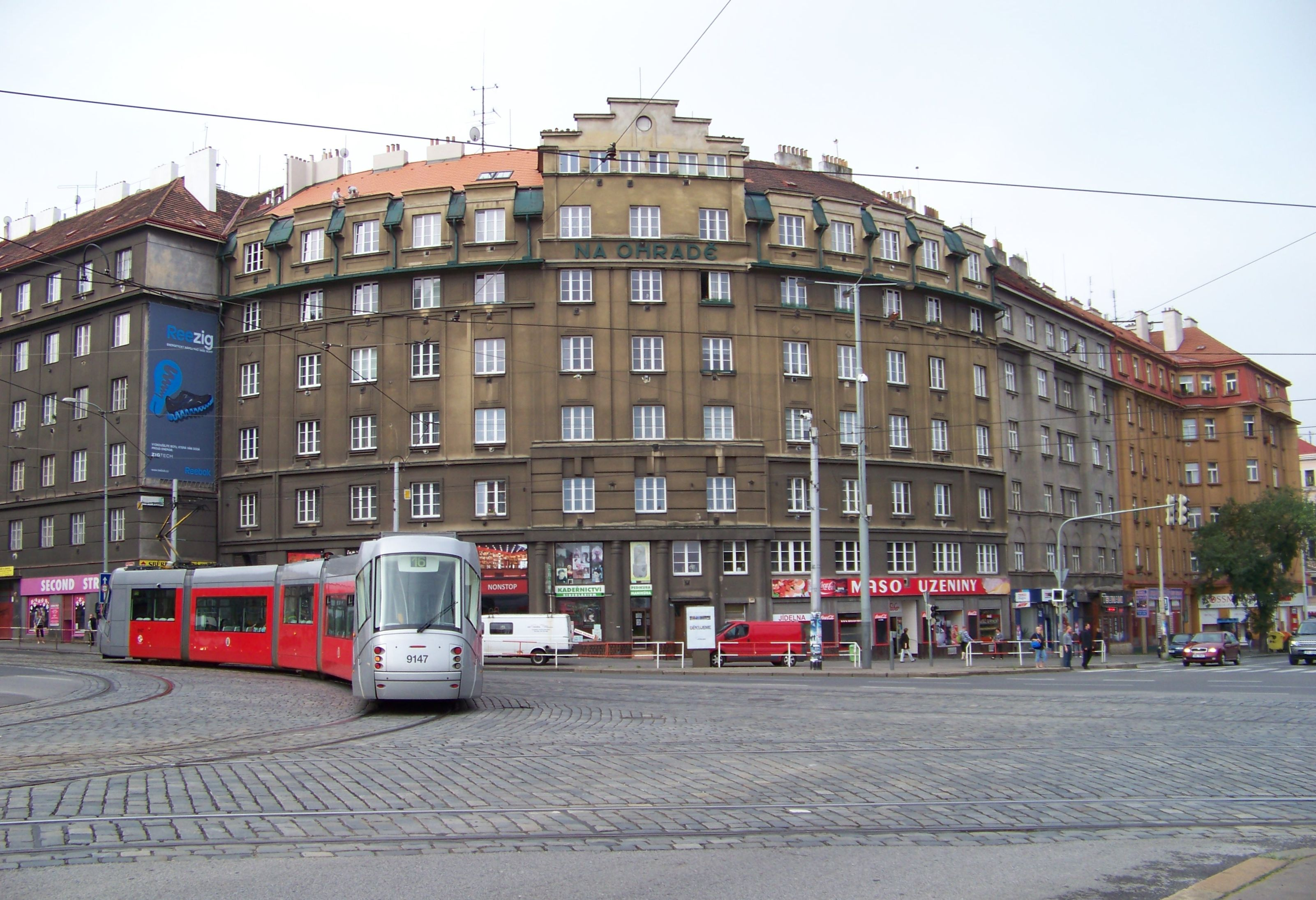
Ohrada area

Žižkov (German: Zischkaberg or Zizkow, between 1939 and 1945 Veitsberg) is a cadastral district of Prague, Czech Republic.

Most of Žižkov lies in the municipal and administrative district of Prague 3, except for very small parts which are in Prague 8 and Prague 10. Prior to 1922, Žižkov was an independent city. The district is named after Hussite military leader Jan Žižka. It is situated south of Vitkov hill, site of the Battle of Vitkov Hill on 14 July 1420, where Žižka's peasant army decisively defeated the forces of Sigismund, Holy Roman Emperor.

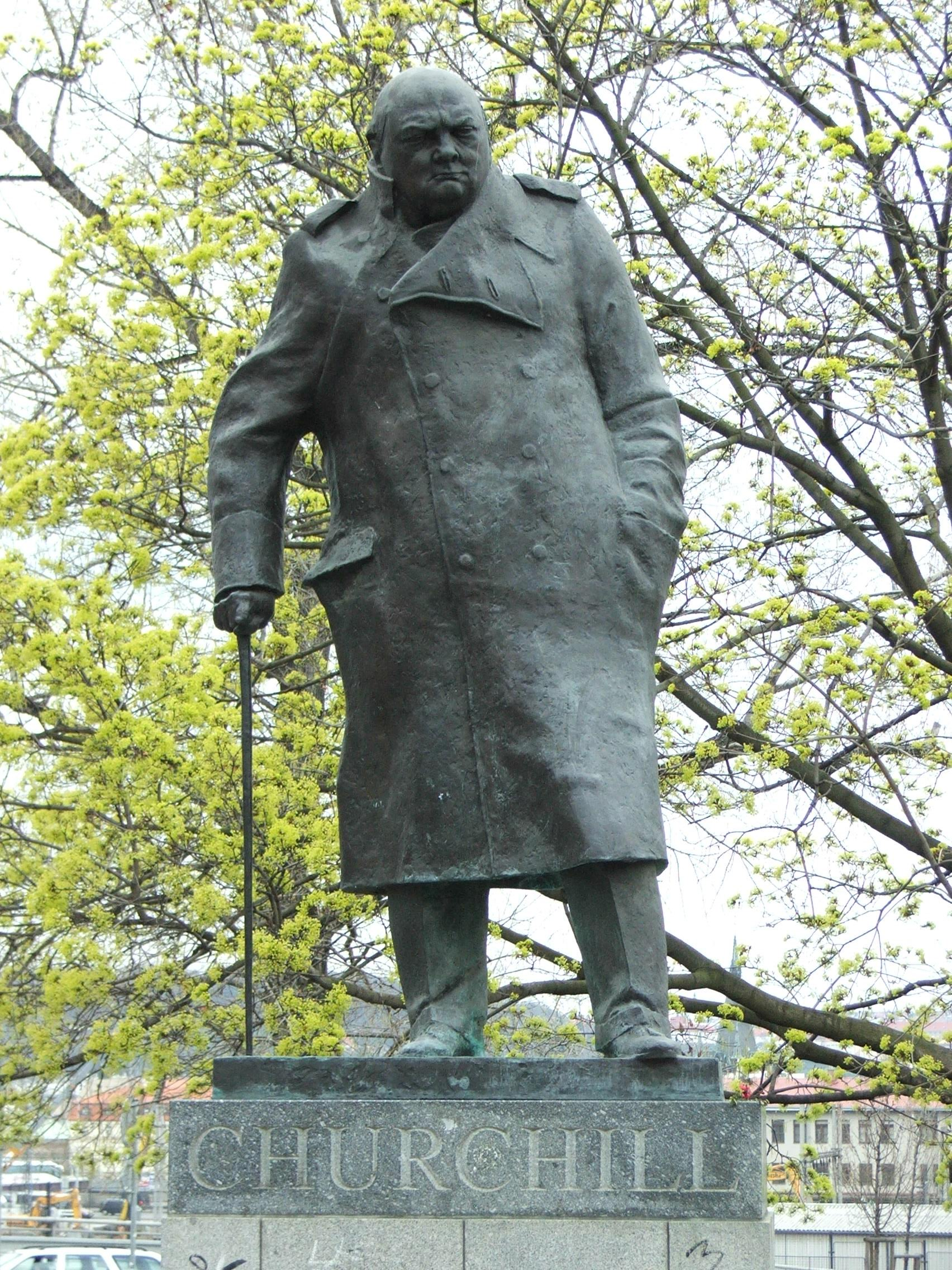
Monument to Churchill on Winston Churchill Square

== History ==
=== Early history ===
The present-day district of Žižkov was originally part of the sparsely populated countryside outside of Prague. Change came through the decision of Emperor Charles IV in 1358 to establish vineyards around Prague within a radius of about three miles. Residents of the hory viniční ("vineyard hills") were given special rights, which were confirmed by other sovereigns, such as exemption from taxes.

A village named Hory Viničné, whose economy was centered on vineyards on the slopes of Vitkov Hill, was first mentioned in 1788. Other vineyard settlements, such as Hrabovka, Ohrada, Parukářka, and Pražačka, would disappear in the course of the 19th century, but they are remembered in local names. According to a census in 1837, the district (including present-day Žižkov and Vinohrady) had a total of 66 houses and estates with 169 inhabitants and 216 head of livestock.

In 1679 and 1680, and again between 1713 and 1716, major plague epidemics broke out in Prague. So many citizens of Prague were killed, that in 1680 new cemeteries needed to be established outside the city walls. The city authorities specified that these cemeteries be able to accommodate one thousand burials. Cemeteries were founded by the town councils of the Old Town, New Town, and Jewish Quarter near the village of Olšany (or Volšan), in present-day Žižkov. The Old Town cemetery eventually became the heart of today's Olšany Cemetery. The Old Jewish Cemetery of Žižkov still exists, as a part of the Mahler Gardens (Czech: Mahlerovy sady) adjacent to the Žižkov Television Tower.

The New Town cemetery, to the east of the Žižkov Jewish Cemetery, is no longer extant. Originally measuring about 50 by 100 m, this cemetery became the official cemetery of Prague's New Town in 1713. During the French occupation of Prague in 1741 and 1742, approximately 6000 to 7000 bodies of French soldiers were buried there in shaft graves. In 1771, a large influenza epidemic, enhanced by famine, led to over 2000 people being buried in the cemetery that year. In 1839 the cemetery, already having a high concentration of burials in a small area (over 8,000), was closed. When Tchaikovsky Street was built in 1957, a large number of skeletal remains from the former cemetery were found.

In June 1849, the whole area received the name Vinohrady. In 1867, Emperor Franz Joseph I renamed it Královské Vinohrady (Czech for Royal Vineyards, Königlich Weinberg in German).

After the middle of the 19th century, Prague went through tremendous growth. Construction near Prague's city walls, however, was discouraged by the military administration, which enforced the demolition of buildings close to the fortifications because they threatened to allow a breach of the walls in the event of war. After Austria's defeat in the Austro-Prussian War of 1866, Prague was declared an open city and, after lengthy negotiations, the municipality of Prague began with the cutting of the walls in 1874. The area near Vitkov received the majority of the railways, allowing the smooth connection of Prague and Žižkov.

Žižkov, drawing on the advantage of its proximity to Prague, experienced extensive development. Earlier, as indicated by census figures, population growth in present-day Žižkov was slow and steady in the mid-19th century: 83 residents in 1843, 197 in 1850, 268 in 1857, and 292 in 1869. After 1865, however, development began in the space between Vitkov hill and Holy Cross (Sv. Kříže) hill and the population increased rapidly. By the 1880s, Žižkov had become a large town with 21,212 inhabitants. Another population census in 1890 counted 42,000 people in more than 750 houses!

On 16 July 1875 the Regional Committee, despite the opposition of the municipal council, divided Královské Vinohrady into two parts: Vinohrady I and Vinohrady II. The name Žižkov was officially accepted for Vinohrady I in August 1877, instead of the name Rudolfov in honor of the Austrian crown prince. Vinohrady II became Královské Vinohrady that same year. The first mayor of Žižkov was Charles Hartig, who is credited with the naming of streets, squares and houses after famous Czechs from Jan Hus to Komensky. On 15 May 1881, Emperor Franz Josef I promoted Žižkov to the status of a city.

=== 20th-century ===
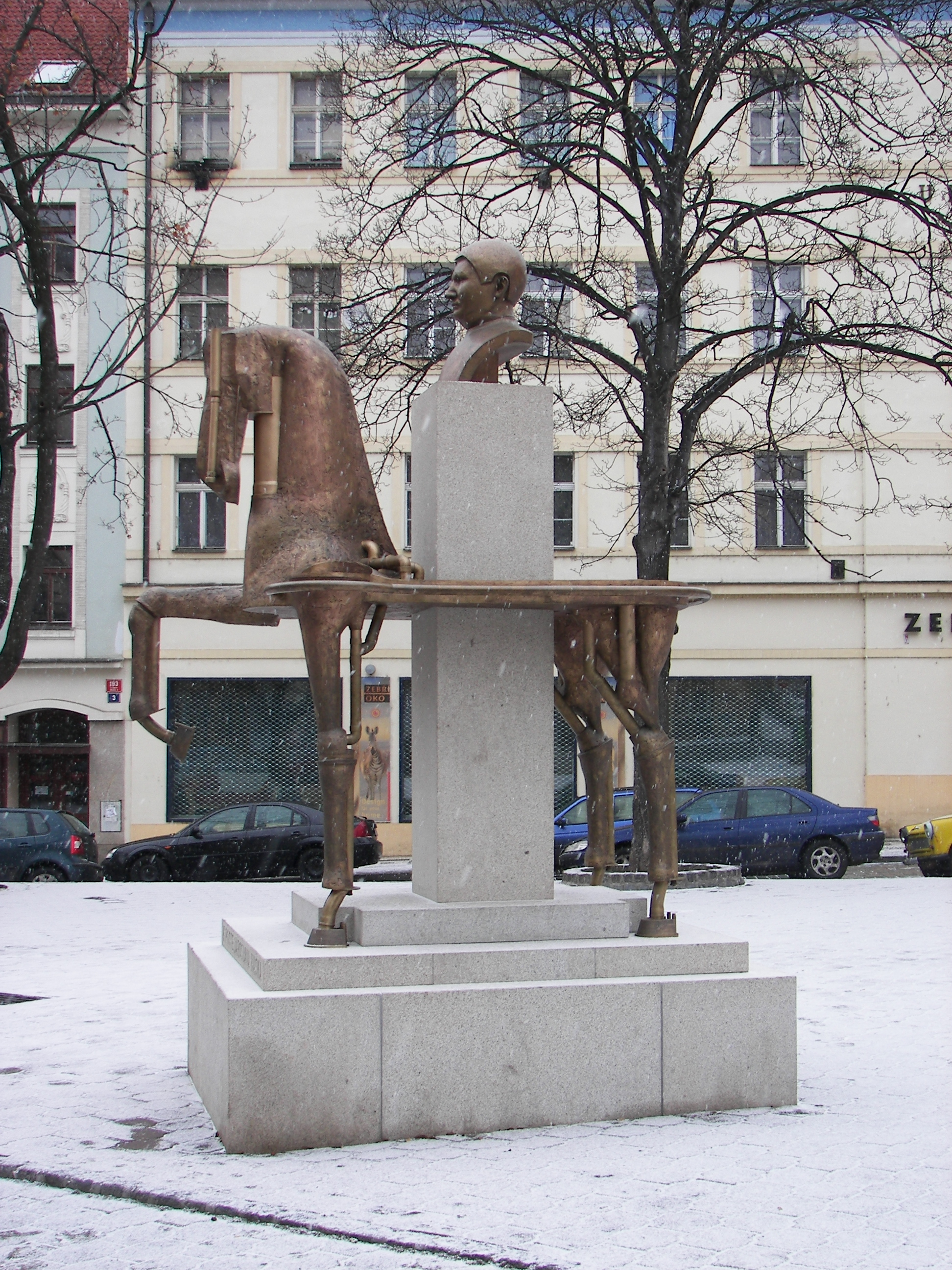
Monument to Jaroslav Hašek on Prokop Square

Žižkov became one of the first neighborhoods outside of the historic city center to be connected to the tram system. The independent city of Žižkov was eventually incorporated into Prague in January 1922.

Although 19th-century Žižkov was regarded as a proletarian neighborhood, there was also industry there. The largest factory, producing matches, was founded by French entrepreneurs Sellier and Bellot at Parukářka at the time of the emergence of the city. At the beginning of the First Republic, there were smaller factories – Papírografie on Vápenka, the Strejc and Nosek precision machine plants, and a number of workshops on Kněžská luka. Small business were often hidden in the courtyards of the residential buildings.

In the early 20th century, Žižkov developed into the "Bohemian" part of Prague, with many artists living or performing there. Writers Jaroslav Hašek (1883–1923) and Franta Sauer (1882–1947) wrote many of their works in Žižkov. In the 1980s, the cornerstone of a monument to Hašek was ceremonially laid on Olšanské Square, though the monument itself was eventually built on Prokop Square. Also, poet Jaroslav Seifert (1901–1986), winner of the Nobel Prize in Literature in 1984, was born and spent most of his life in Žižkov.

At the end of World War I, the circle of the Bohemian writers originated the concept of the Žižkov Free Republic resistance movement. This concept was remembered by the mayor of Prague 3, Milan Český, on 25 July 2001 when the Ambassador of the European Union in the Czech Republic, Ramiro Cibrian, officially visited the city. In the spirit of the resistance, Cibrian symbolically invited Žižkov into the EU.

During the second world war Žižkov was an area of considerable activity on the part of the Czech resistance movement. This was emphasised when the Reinhard Heydrich assassination parachutists were looked after by families within the area. In particular, to this day plaques can be seen to the Moravec family on Biskupcova 7 and Jan Zelinky (almost opposite) on Biskupcova 4.

In the 1970s, the communist city government of Prague developed plans to completely rebuild the district. The narrow streets were to be widened and the old tenements replaced by precast-concrete apartment blocks. These plans, however, were repeatedly postponed and eventually discarded after the overthrow of communism in 1989.

After the Velvet Revolution, often in connection with the restitution of houses, reconstruction and rehabilitation began in Žižkov. While many houses have since been renovated, the look of the neighborhood has not changed much.

=== Žižkov today ===
The Žižkovians were very proud of their bad reputation and up to this day they tend to refer to their neighbourhood as the "Free Republic of Žižkov". Like many districts of the city, Žižkov today is socioeconomically diverse. It is undergoing a renewal, with many older buildings being reconstructed and restored. New fashionable cafes and restaurants are appearing and property prices are increasing rapidly. Žižkov is said to have the highest number of pubs per capita of any city district in Europe, with more than 300. The Palac Akropolis is recognized as a center of cultural events in the area.

== Significant sights ==
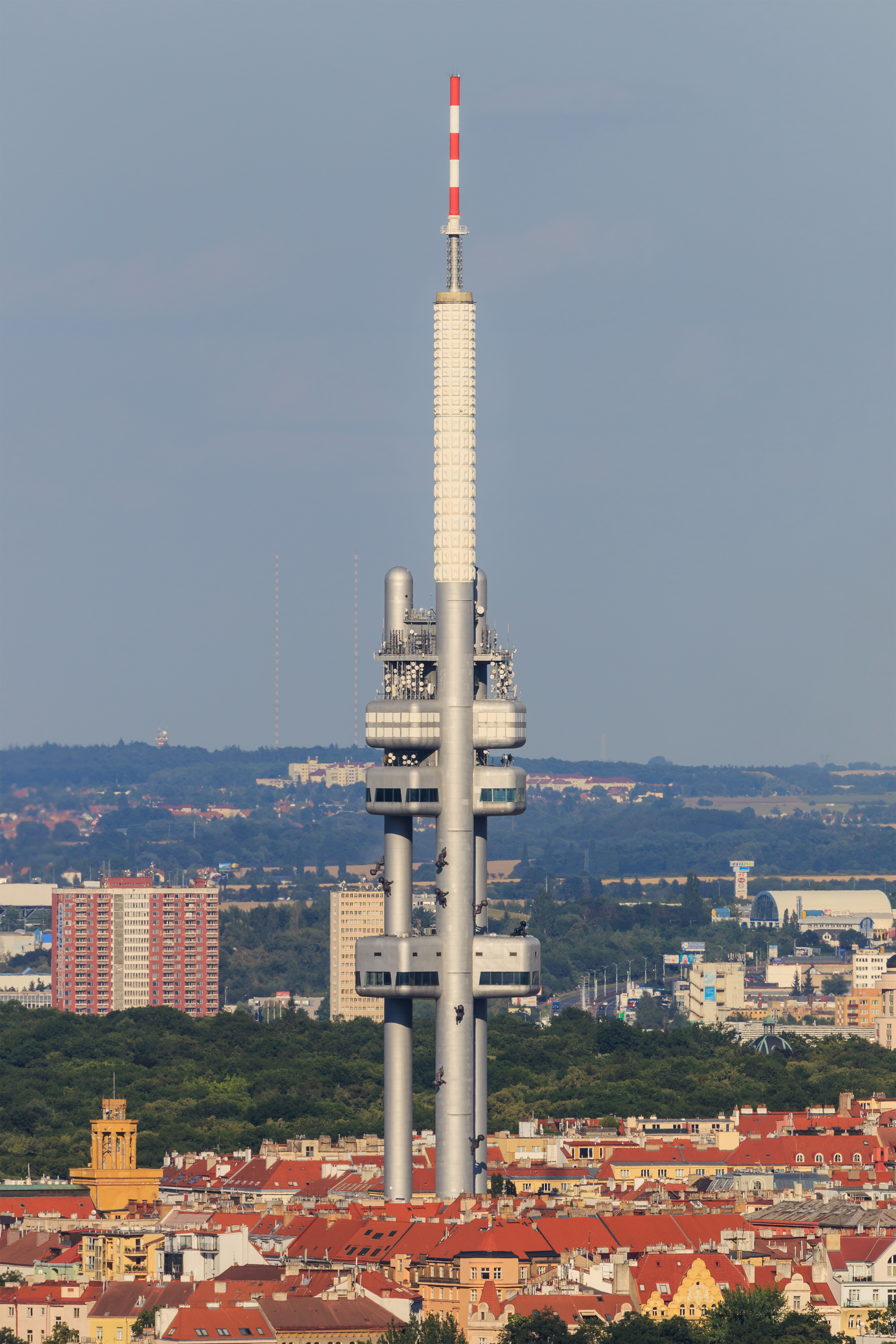
Žižkov Television Tower

=== Žižkov Television Tower ===
The Žižkov Television Tower (Žižkovský vysílač) is a uniquely designed tower built in Žižkov between 1985 and 1992. According to the design of architect Václav Aulický, it consists of three concrete pillars that carry cabinets for the transmitters, a restaurant and cafe, and three observation rooms. The tower is Prague's tallest structure at 216 metres (709 ft) high, with the observation decks at a height of 100 metres (330 ft) and the tower restaurant and cafe situated at 63 metres (207 ft). Located near the border with Vinohrady, it is surrounded by the Mahler Gardens. In 2000, it was decorated with surrealist sculptures by David Černý of infants climbing the tower.

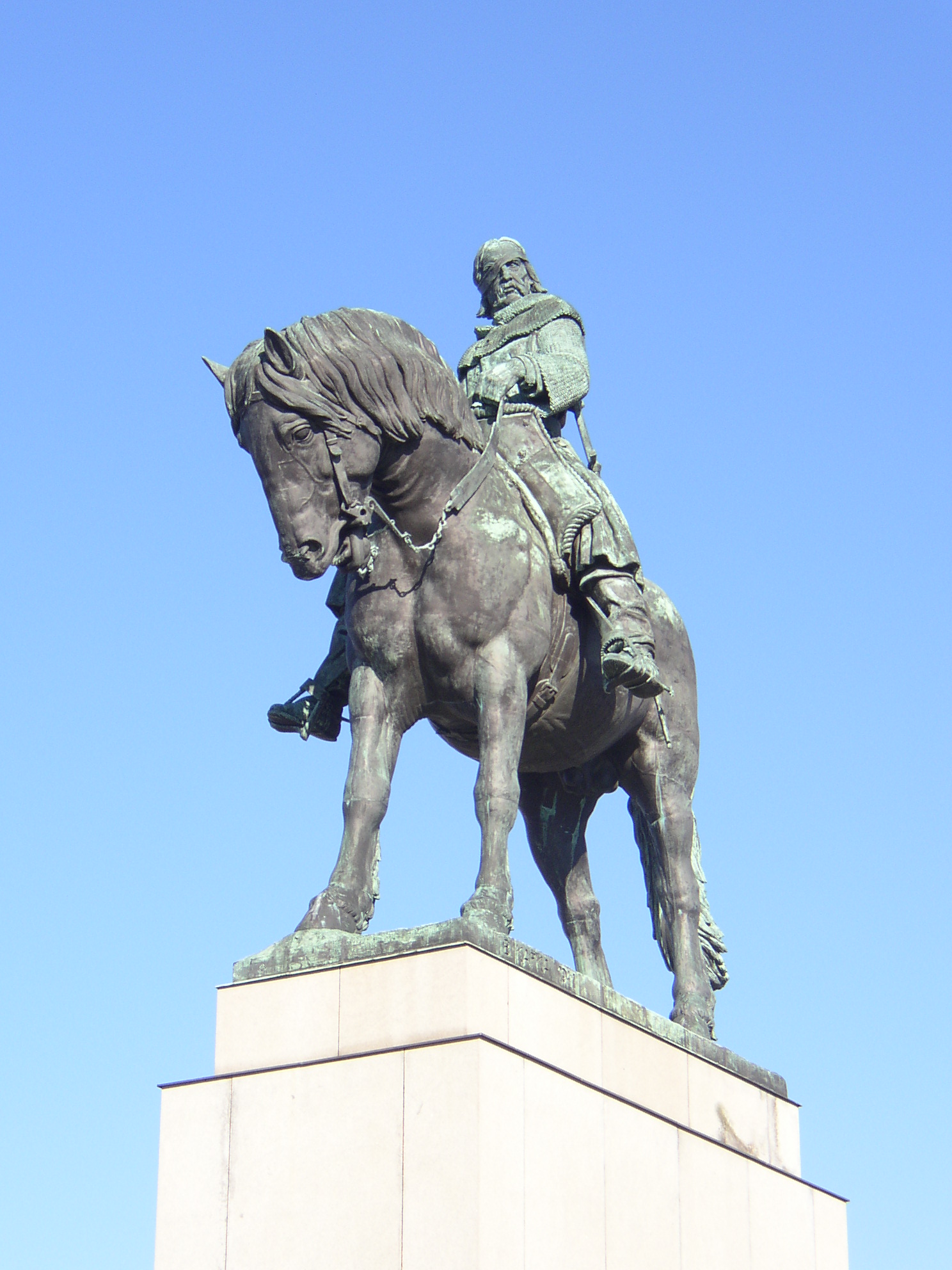
Jan Žižka Monument

=== National Monument ===
The National Monument was established on Vítkov Hill in 1950. The 9-meter high and 16.5-ton monument to Jan Žižka by Bohumil Kafka is the third largest bronze equestrian statue in the world. The idea for the monument existed as early as 1877, but construction did not begin until 1928. A major inauguration ceremony was planned for 1938, but had to be postponed due to the Munich Agreement. The monument was only completed after World War II, but with additional elements added by Czechoslovakia's communist rulers. In 1953, they had deceased head of state Klement Gottwald embalmed and buried in a mausoleum behind the monument. The embalming of Gottwald failed, however, and the corpse was eventually cremated in 1962. A museum opened there in October 2009.

=== Olšany Cemetery ===
Olšany Cemetery (Czech: Olšanské hřbitovy) in Žižkov (which takes up a large space of the district) is the largest graveyard in Prague. The cemetery is particularly noted for its many remarkable Art Nouveau monuments.

=== New Jewish Cemetery ===
The New Jewish Cemetery in Žižkov was established in 1891. The cemetery is noted for its many Art Nouveau monuments, among them, two monuments for members of the Perutz family by Jan Kotera and the monument to artist Max Horb by Jan Štursa in the form of a mourning peacock. Notable burials include writer Franz Kafka.

=== Churches of Žižkov ===
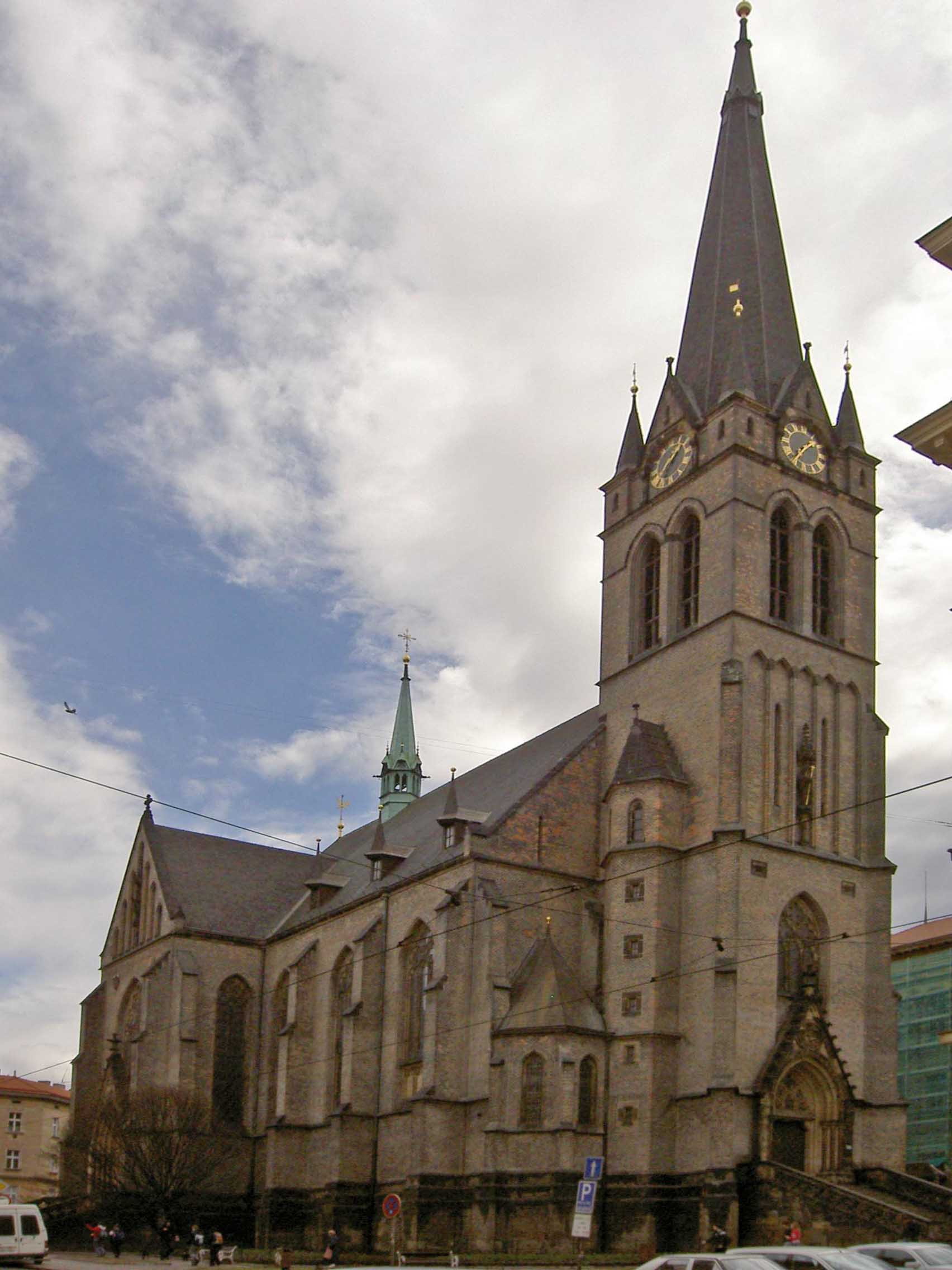
Church of St. Procopius

- Church of Saint Procopius – Dedicated to St. Procopius of Sázava, this three-aisled neo-Gothic church is located at Sladkovského Square in Žižkov. It was designed by Bohemian architects Josef Mocker and František Mikš. The foundation stone was ceremonially laid on 30 October 1898 on the 50th anniversary of the reign of Franz Joseph I of Austria. The church was consecrated in 1903. The portal over the north entrance has a relief with the Madonna with the Infant Jesus in the middle and a kneeling St. Procopius on her right side. Over the west entrance is a relief of St. Adalbert. The church's tower is 72 metres (236 ft) high. Of the interior furnishings, the most famous is a painting by Karel Škréta of St. Wenceslaus defending Prague against the Swedes in 1649.
- Church of Saint Roch, located on Olšany Square (Czech: Olšanské náměstí), is the oldest church in present-day Žižkov. The Baroque structure was built between 1680 and 1682 by Jan Hainric, probably according to plans by the renowned architect Jean Baptiste Mathey. Dedicated to a patron saint of plague victims, the church was originally built as a plague chapel for the Old Town cemetery established during a plague epidemic which broke out in Prague in early 1680. The church's shape is an elliptical dome (because of which the church is incorrectly called the Rotunda). Arcades stretch between the columns, supporting a gallery. The main Neo-Renaissance altar is the work of Antonin Baum and dates to 1879, when the church interior was restored and modified. In its center is a picture of an earlier period, the work of Ignác Raab in 1760, divided into two zones. At the top is the Virgin Mary as the Queen of Heaven with angels and at the bottom are patron saints invoked against plague epidemics: St. Roch, St. Sebastian, and St. Rosalia. The background of the image depicts the horror and destruction caused by the plague.

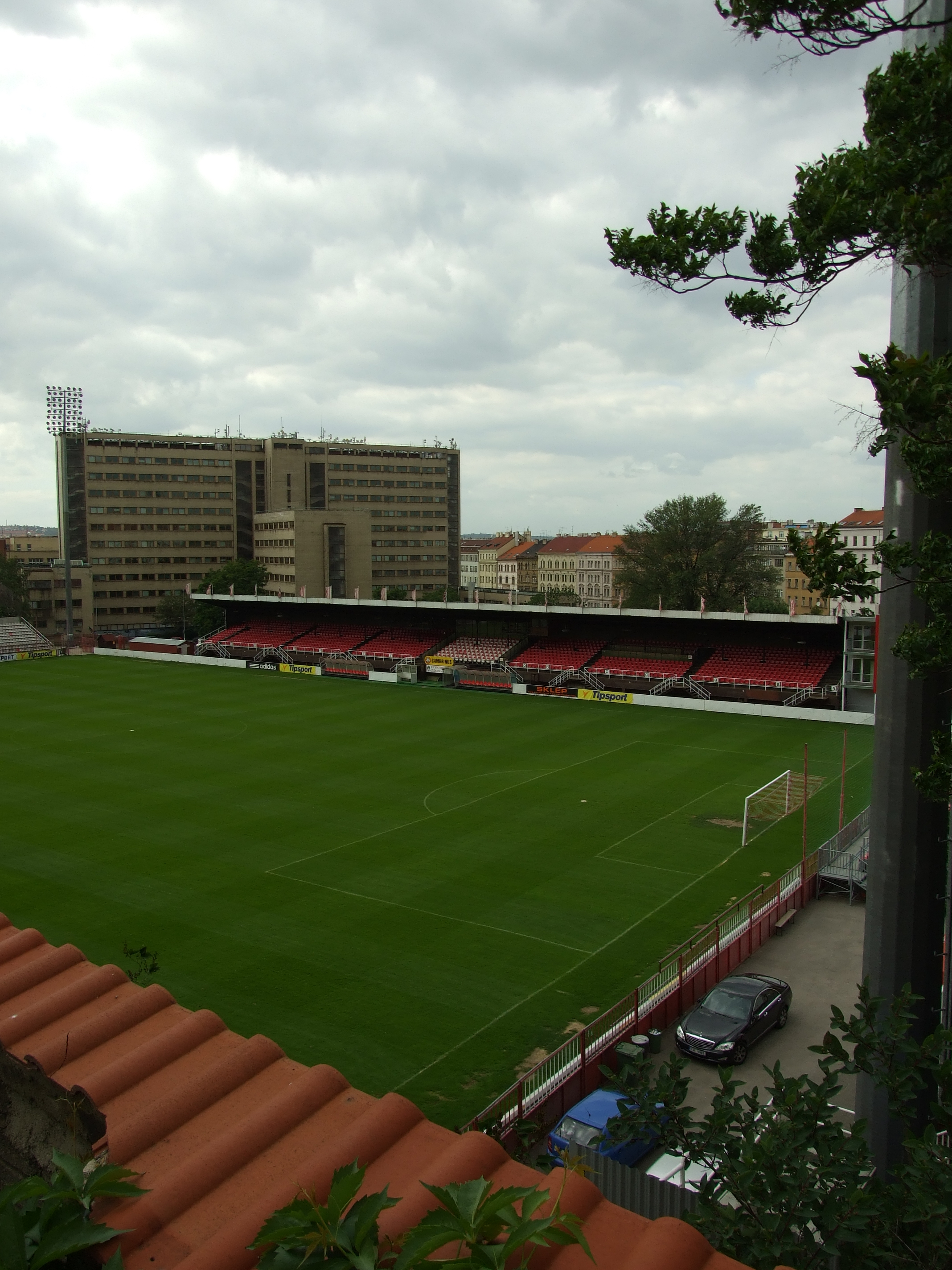
FK Viktoria Stadion

=== Parks ===
Several parks are within Žižkov including Holy Cross Hill, Vitkov, the park at the Židovských furnace, and the Paradise Garden.

== Demographics ==
Historical population

Year	Pop.	±%
1869	4,336	—
1880	21,212	+389.2%
1890	41,236	+94.4%
1900	59,326	+43.9%
1910	72,173	+21.7%

Year	Pop.	±%
1921	71,766	−0.6%
1930	93,098	+29.7%
1950	90,234	−3.1%
1961	92,834	+2.9%
1970	84,860	−8.6%

Year	Pop.	±%
1980	68,898	−18.8%
1991	61,286	−11.0%
2001	55,401	−9.6%
2011	56,056	+1.2%
2021	58,267	+3.9%

Source: Censuses

== Economy ==
=== Education ===
On Churchill Square, near the main railway station, is the Prague University of Economics, the General Pension Establishment, dating from 1934 and designed by Havlíček and Honzík and the Churchill Statue.

=== Transport ===
Žižkov is served by many tram and bus routes. The southern parts of Žižkov are served by Jiřího z Poděbrad, Flora and Želivského stations on Line A of the Prague Metro.

== Culture ==
=== Sports ===
Before World War II, Žižkov had the highest density of football clubs in Prague with more than 20 teams. The most well-known club in the neighborhood is FK Viktoria Žižkov, founded in 1903. Viktoria's home ground is FK Viktoria Stadion in Žižkov. Other clubs included AFK Union Žižkov (the Czechoslovak Amateur champion of 1925), Werkself SS Plincner (Central Bohemian Cup finalists of 1941), and Čechie Žižkov. Under the communist regime, numerous football pitches disappeared in the course of development and with them the local clubs. Only Viktoria and Union still exist today.

The neighborhood also has a swimming pool, recently renovated with the support of the Prague 3 administration. There are also several boxing clubs.

=== Theatre ===
- Jára Cimrman Theatre (Czech: Divadlo Járy Cimrmana) in Žižkov: named after Jára Cimrman, a fictional "Greatest Czech", is one of Prague's most frequented theatre houses.
- Ponec Theatre Czech: Divadlo Ponec: theatre of modern dance and movement.
- The Acropolis Theatre was the theatre scene in the Acropolis Palace , influential in the interbellum Prague.

=== Events ===
Prague's biggest Carnival celebration (called Masopust in Czech) is annually held in Žižkov. Together with the wine harvest festival, both events attract tens of thousands of visitors each year.

== Notable people ==
- Hana Sachsová (1907–1987), politician and educator

== Sources ==
- Šesták, Zdeněk (2005). Jak žil Žižkov před sto lety (in Czech). Prague: Academia. ISBN 80-200-1305-9.
- Kröhnke, Friedrich (2003). Ciao Vaschek (in Czech). Zürich: Ammann. ISBN 3-250-60062-8.
