= Strašnická (Prague Metro) =

Prague metro station

Coordinates: 50°04′22″N 14°29′28″E

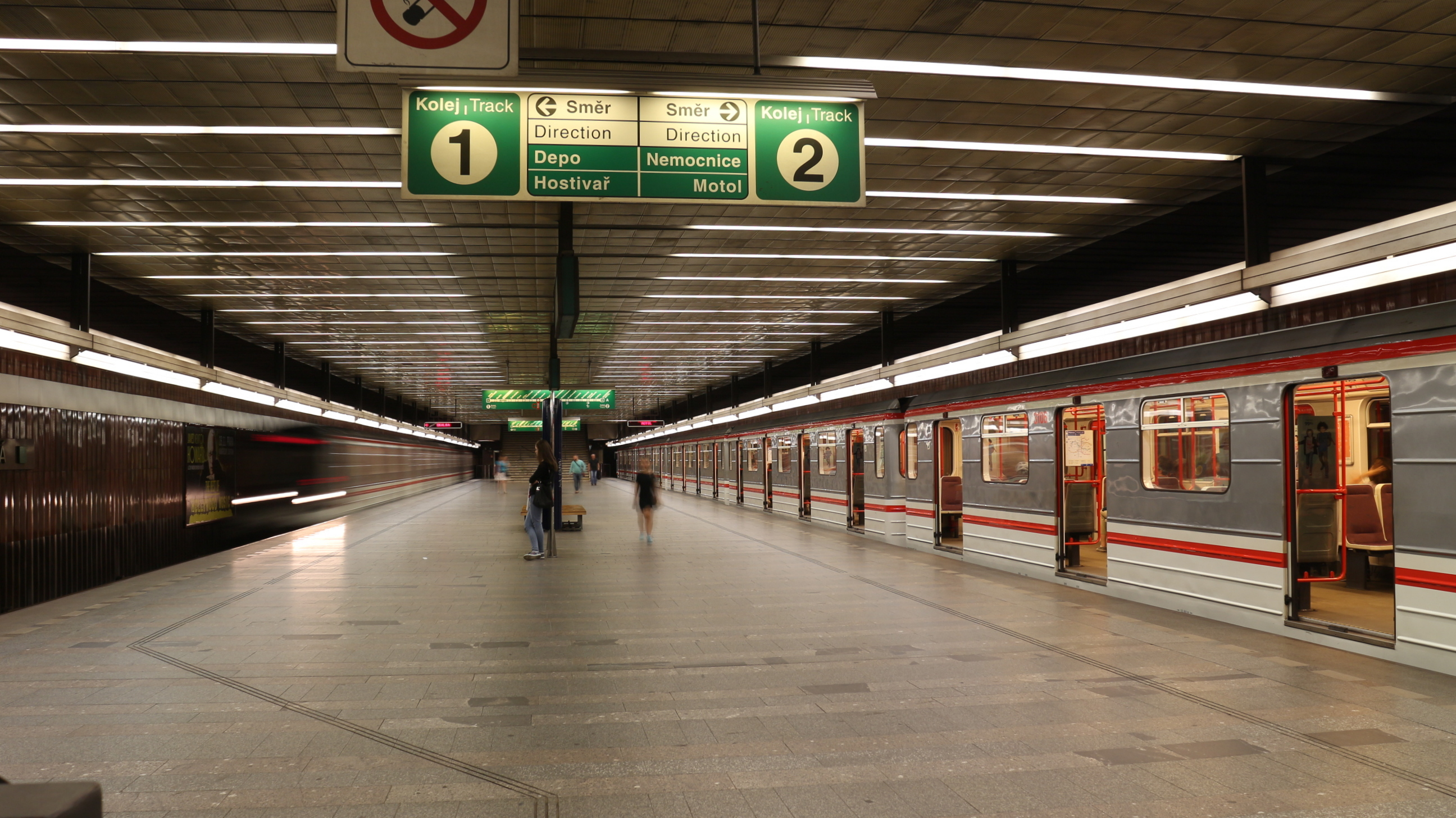

General information
- Location: Starostrašnická street, Strašnice; Prague 10; Prague; Czech Republic
- System: Prague Metro
- Platforms: 1 island platform
- Tracks: 2

Construction
- Structure type: Underground
- Depth: 75 m (246 ft)
- Accessible: Yes

History
- Opened: 11 July 1987; 39 years ago

Services
| Preceding station | Prague Metro | Following station |
|---|---|---|
| Želivského toward Nemocnice Motol | Line A | Skalka toward Depo Hostivař |
Location

Strašnická (Czech pronunciation: [ˈstraʃɲɪtskaː]) is a Prague Metro station on Line A, located in Strašnice, Prague 10. It was opened on 11 July 1987 as the eastern terminus of the extension from Želivského. On 4 July 1990, the line was extended to Skalka. The station is located under Starostrašnická Street, 7.5 m (25 ft) below the surface. The station has only one concourse leading to Starostrašnická, which is connected to a fixed platform with stairs and a ramp for disabled passengers. The interior of the station is paneled with dark brown tiles. Construction of the station cost 241.4 million crowns.

== Gallery ==
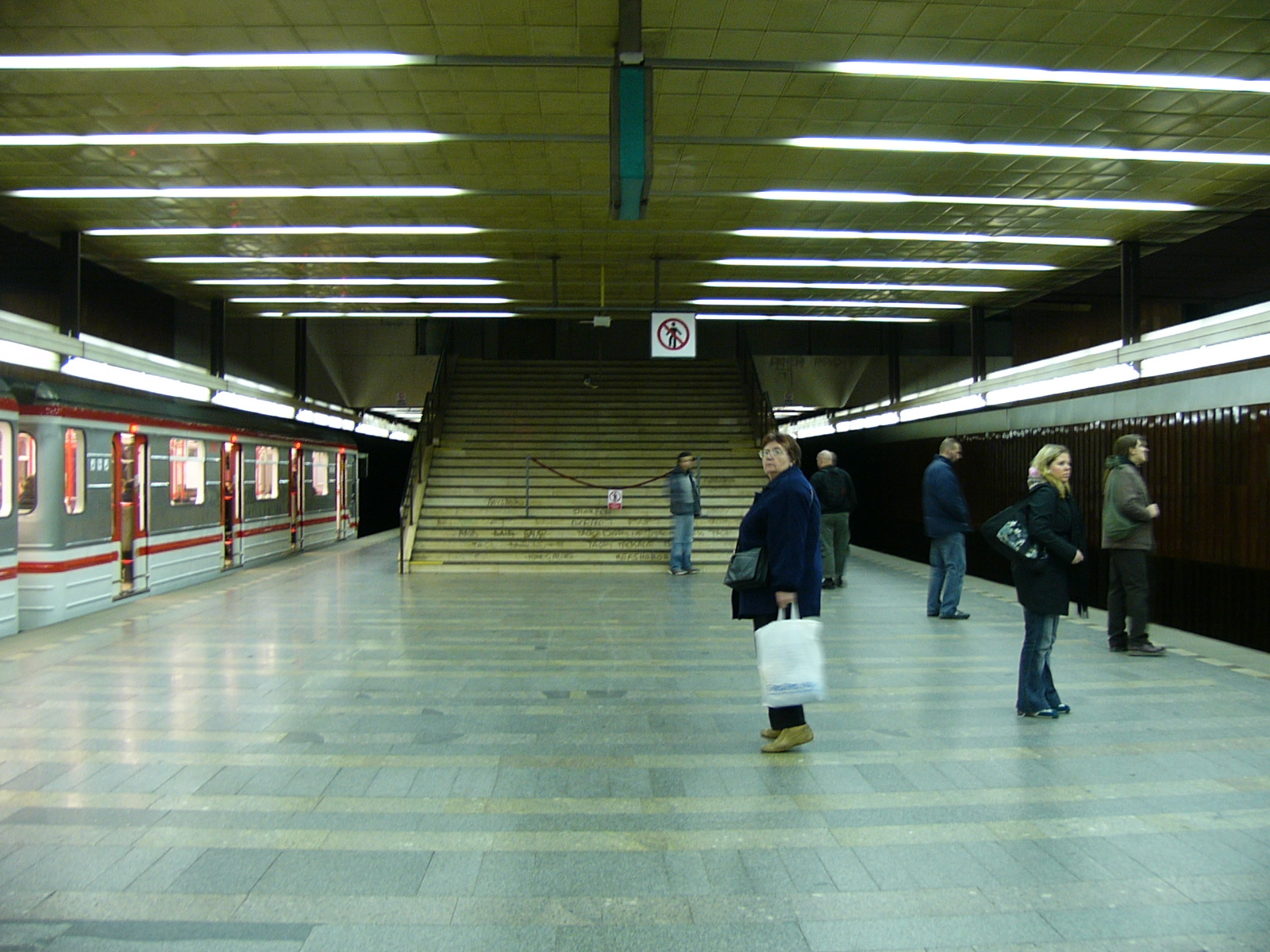
Platform at Strašnická

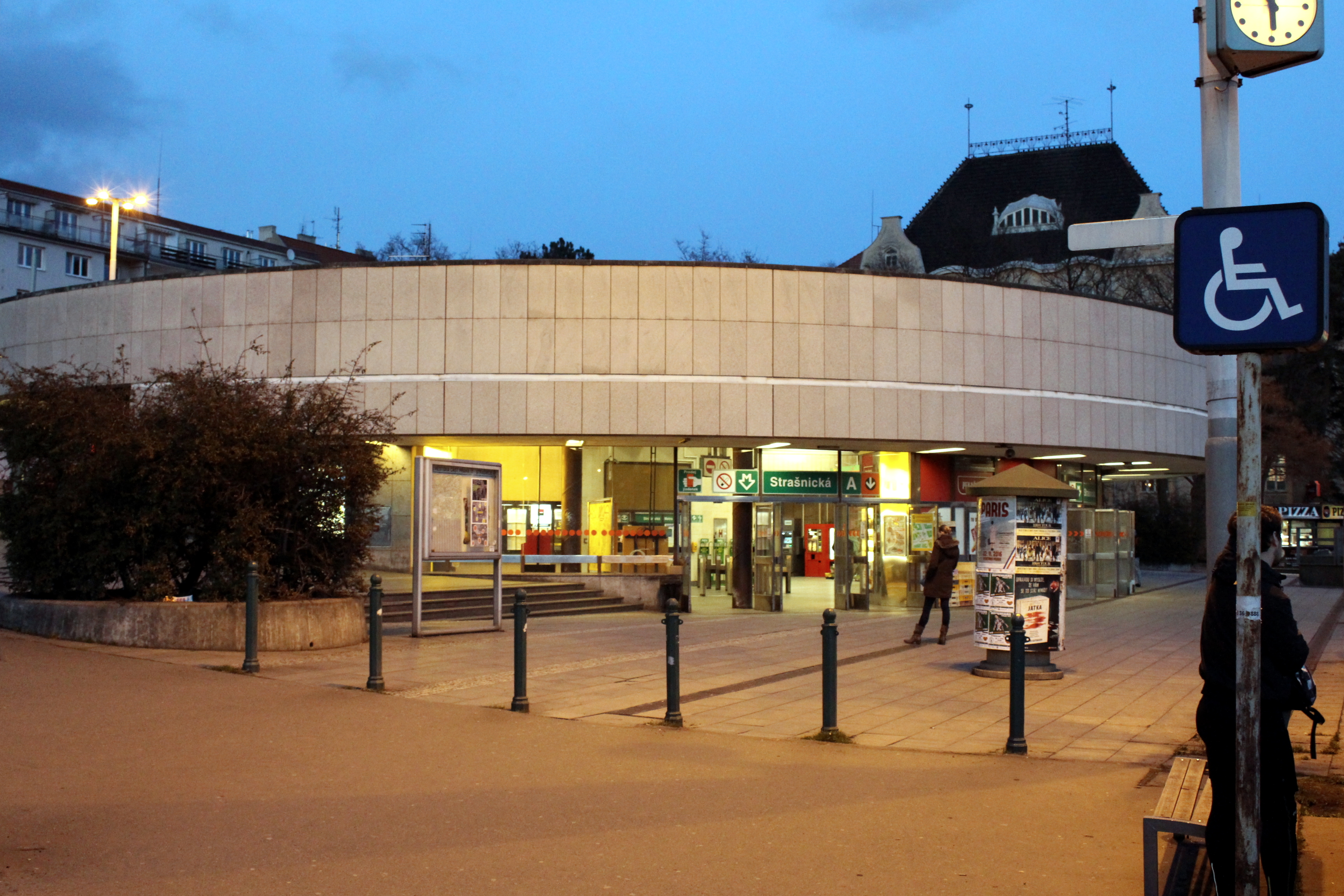
Entrance to the station
