= Church of Saint Roch, Žižkov =

Church in Zizkov, Czech Republic

Coordinates: 50°4′57″N 14°27′37″E

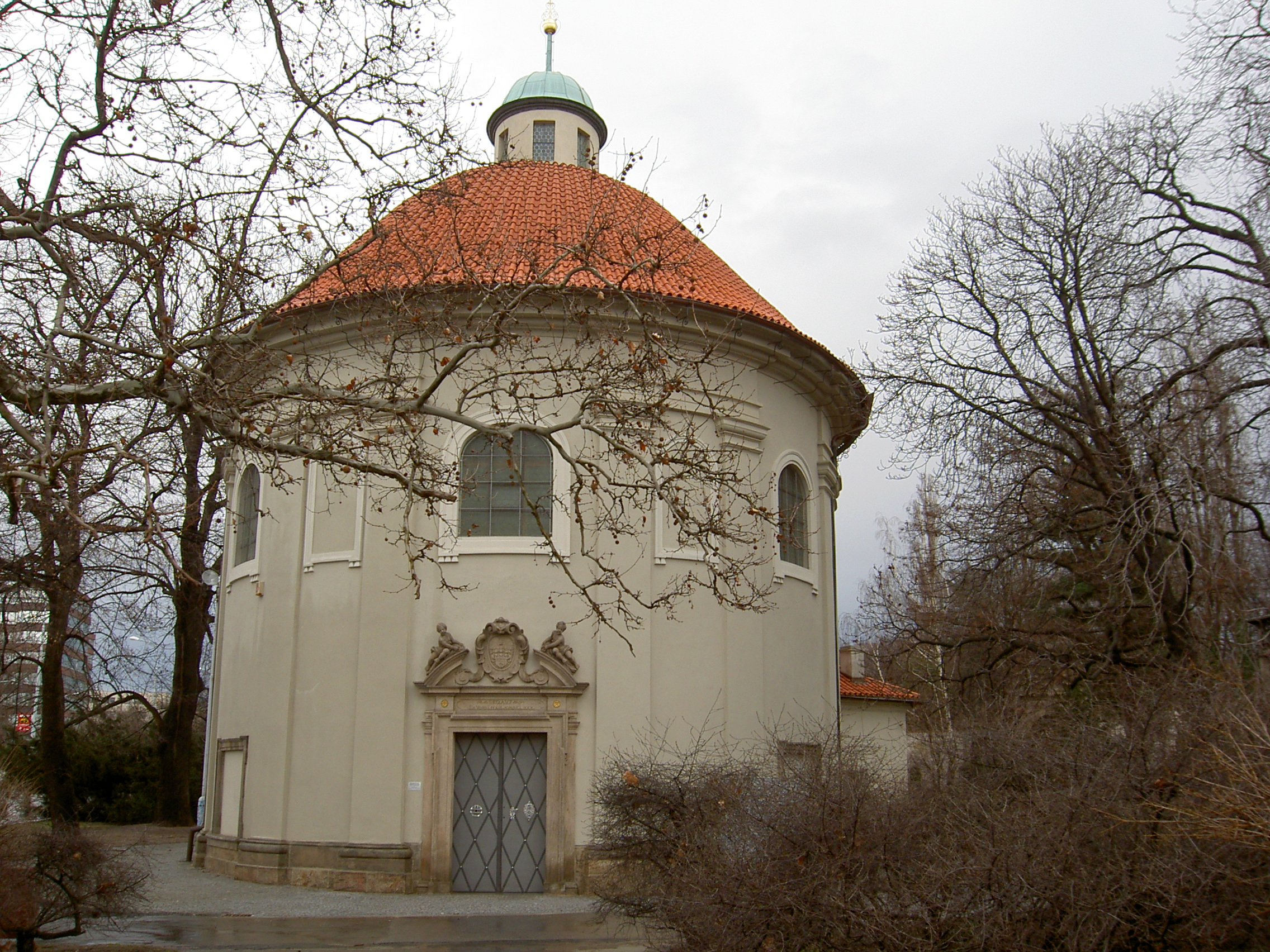
Church of Saint Roch, as viewed from Olšanska Square

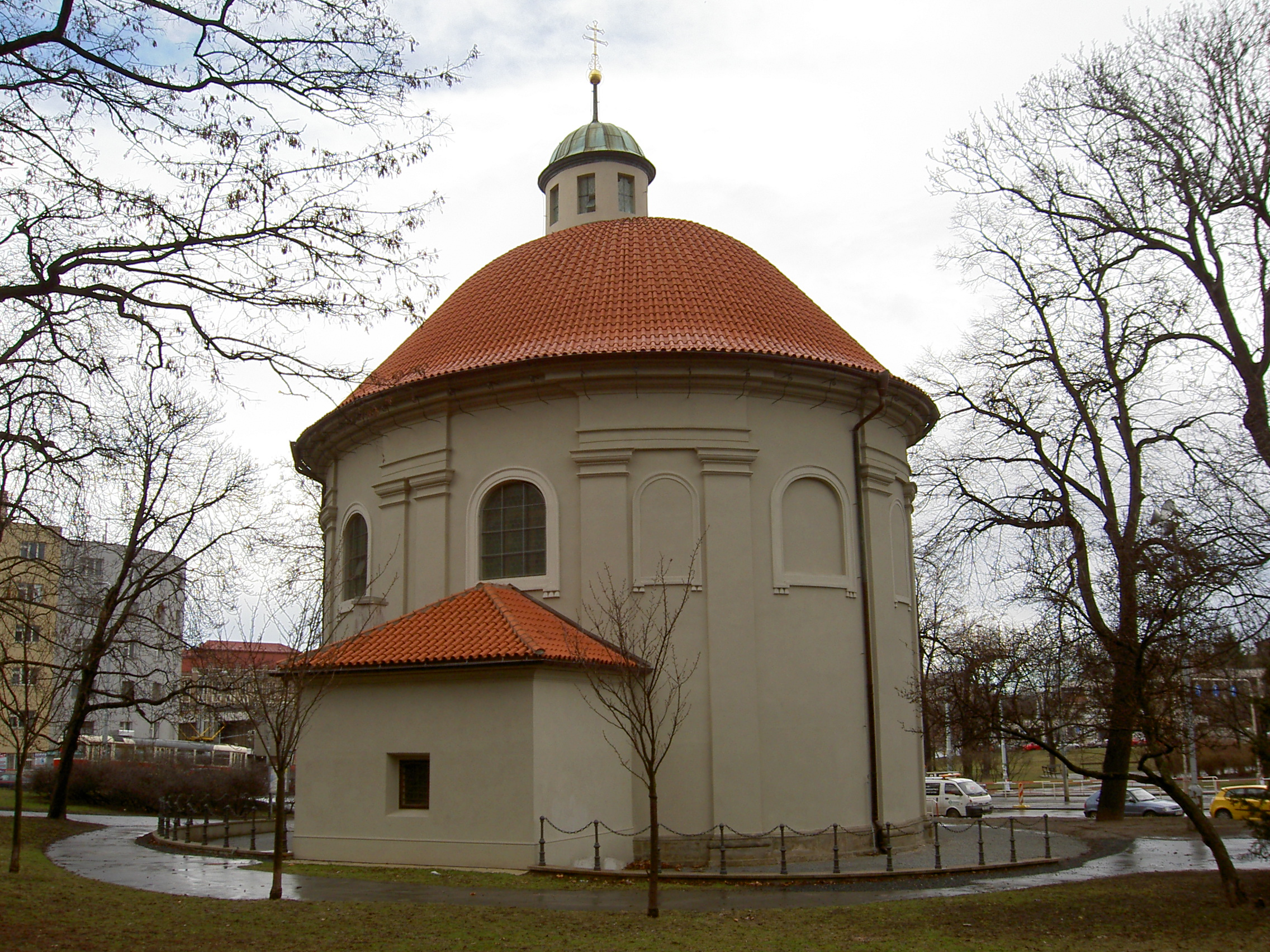
Church of Saint Roch, as viewed from Olšansky Cemetery

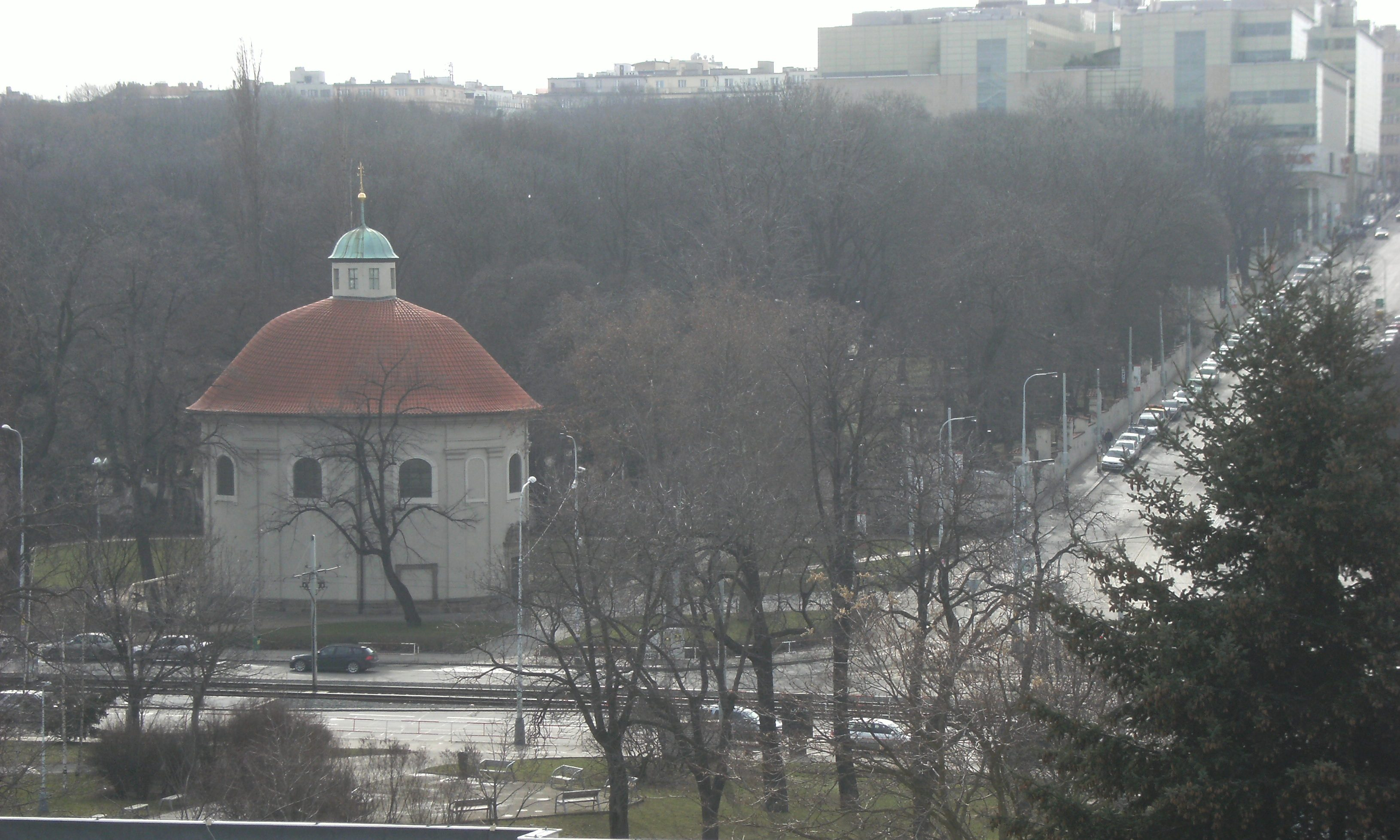
Church of Saint Roch, as viewed from Holy Cross Hill

The Church of Saint Roch, located on Olšany Square (Czech: Olšanské náměstí), is the oldest church in present-day Žižkov, a cadastral district of Prague, Czech Republic. The Baroque structure was built between 1680 and 1682 by Jan Hainric, probably according to plans by the renowned French architect Jean Baptiste Mathey.

== History ==
The stimulus for the church's construction was the plague epidemic which broke out in Prague in early 1680. So many citizens of Prague were killed, that new cemeteries needed to be established outside the city walls. Plague cemeteries were laid out in Olšany for the Old Town, New Town, and Jewish Quarter. The Old Town City Council also decided to build a pestilence chapel on its newly established burial ground. It was dedicated to St. Roch, a patron saint of plague victims.

The Church of Saint Roch continued to function as a cemetery church, even after the Olšany Cemetery began to accept regular burials among the plague victims. In 1839, a decree of the Governor abolished the parish church of the Elevation of the Holy Cross because of structural defects and adverse location, and the parish church functions began to be transferred to St. Roch of Olšany. From 1842, it engaged in all acts of parish spiritual administration.

In the construction of the streets of present-day Olšanska Square, part of the original cemetery wall, behind which the Church of St. Roch stood, was demolished. The construction also required the removal of the old rectory. So today is the church stands alone in the middle of a green space. In recent years, the church has undergone reconstruction, including replacement of the roof, and the surrounding park land has been renovated.

== Structure and furnishings ==
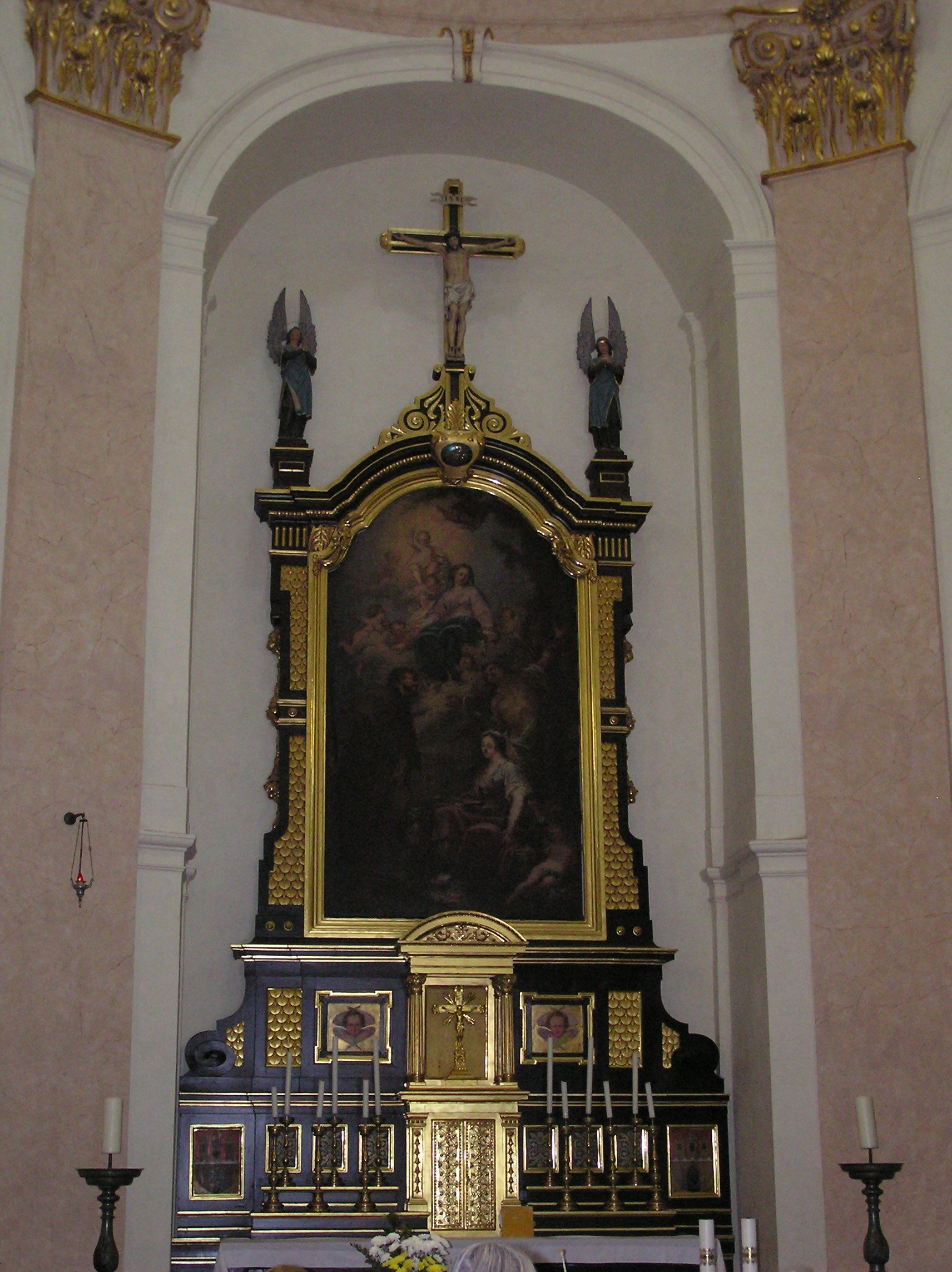
Main altar of Church of St. Roch

The church's shape is an elliptical dome (because of which the church is incorrectly called the "Rotunda"). Arcades stretch between the columns, supporting a gallery.

The main Neo-Renaissance altar is the work of Antonin Baum and dates to 1879, when the church interior was restored and modified. In its center is a picture of an earlier period, the work of Ignác Raab in 1760, divided into two zones. At the top is the Virgin Mary as the Queen of Heaven with angels and at the bottom are patron saints invoked against plague epidemics: St. Roch, Saint Sebastian, and Saint Rosalia. The background of the image depicts the horror and destruction caused by the plague.

The right side altar to the Virgin Mary is decorated with an image by J. Heřman. Located on the opposite side is the altar to Saint Joseph, together with a statue of Saint John the Baptist, which comes from Switzerland. The Stations of the Cross were painted by G. W. Weis in 1854 according to drawings of Führichových, while the great fresco above the entrance to the sacristy, which depicts the Litany, was created in 1766 by J. Steter. The oldest preserved object in the church is the Baroque tin baptismal font from 1595 from tin-smith Matthew Voříška of Roudnice on the Elbe.
