= Želivského (Prague Metro) =

Prague metro station

Coordinates: 50.0784°N 14.4741°E

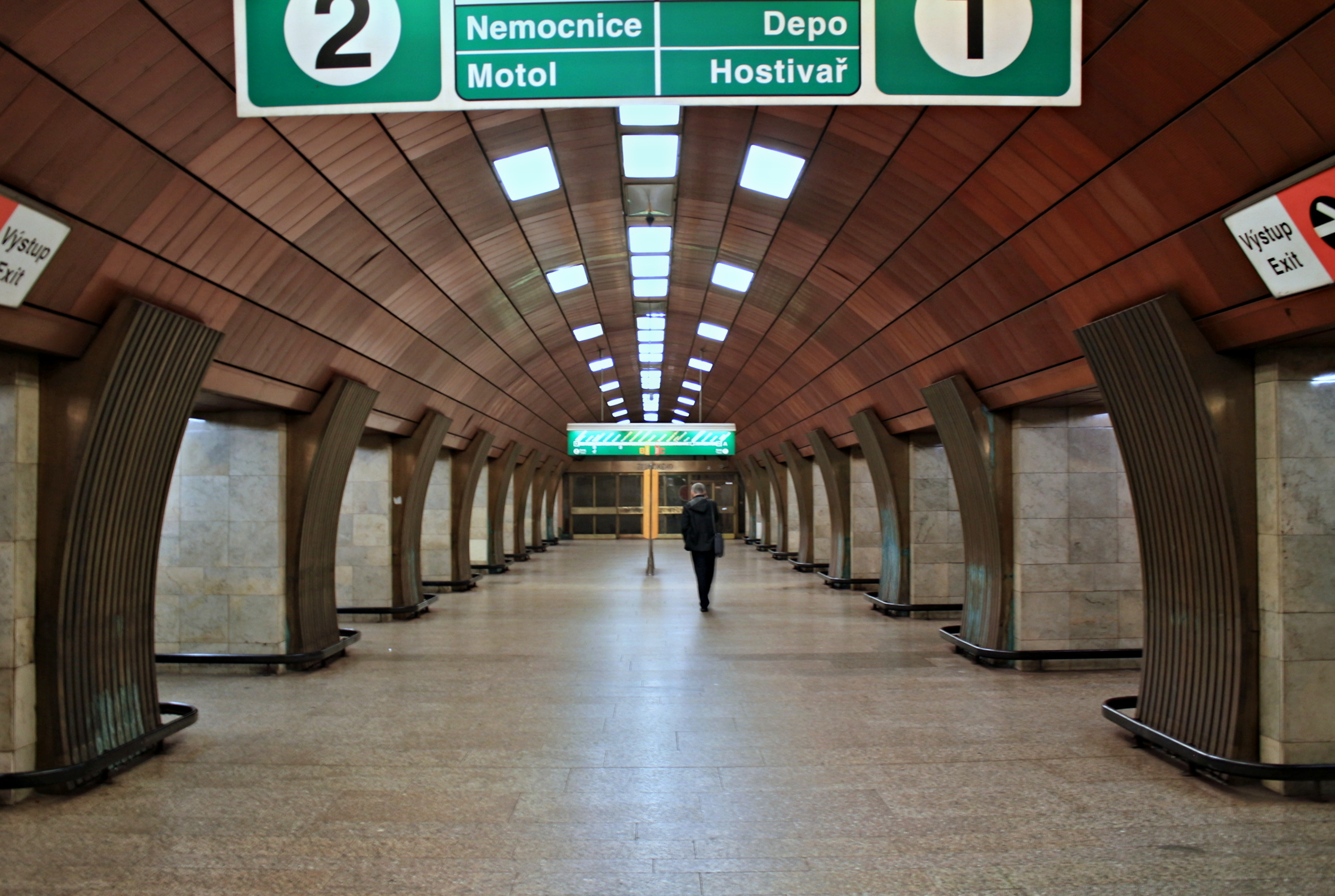

General information
- Location: Vinohradská, Olšany; Prague 3 Prague; Czech Republic
- System: Prague Metro
- Platforms: 1 island platform
- Tracks: 2

Construction
- Structure type: Underground
- Depth: 266 m (873 ft)

History
- Opened: 19 December 1980; 45 years ago

Services
| Preceding station | Prague Metro | Following station |
|---|---|---|
| Flora toward Nemocnice Motol | Line A | Strašnická toward Depo Hostivař |
Location

Želivského (Czech pronunciation: [ˈʒɛlɪfskɛːɦo]) is a station on Line A of the Prague Metro. The station is located under Vinohradská street next to the Olšany Cemetery. It is named after the Jana Želivského street, which is itself named after Jan Želivský. The station was opened on 19 December 1980 as the eastern terminus of the extension of the line from Náměstí Míru. On 11 July 1987 the line was extended to Strašnická.

== Characteristics ==
The station is a three-bore buttressed tunnel with ten pairs of boarding and deboarding accesses. It is 148 meters long in total, but the boarding platform spans only 100 meters. The walls of the station are covered with brown and gold, anodized, aluminum mouldings. The single lobby under Vinohradská Avenue is 5.6 meters underground. The lobby is connected to the street by three exits with escalators and to the platform by one long tunnel with escalators running in both directions. Behind the station are two hold yards and one reverse track capable of storing an entire train. Extension of the A-line to the Strašnická Station was achieved by boring tunnels from these auxiliary spaces. The reverse track is still used for reversing and storing trains even though the Želivského Station is no longer the terminus of the line. The construction of the station in 1980 cost approximately 301 million Czech crowns.

The station has not been renovated since its construction and therefore still exhibits the original design of the first versions of the A-line. The system of overhead lighting units in the escalator tunnel along with the aluminum paneled walls function as a damper against the sound of the escalators which are loud by design. The lower spaces of the station have been subject to leaks which have in turn caused rust on the aluminum panels.

== Gallery ==
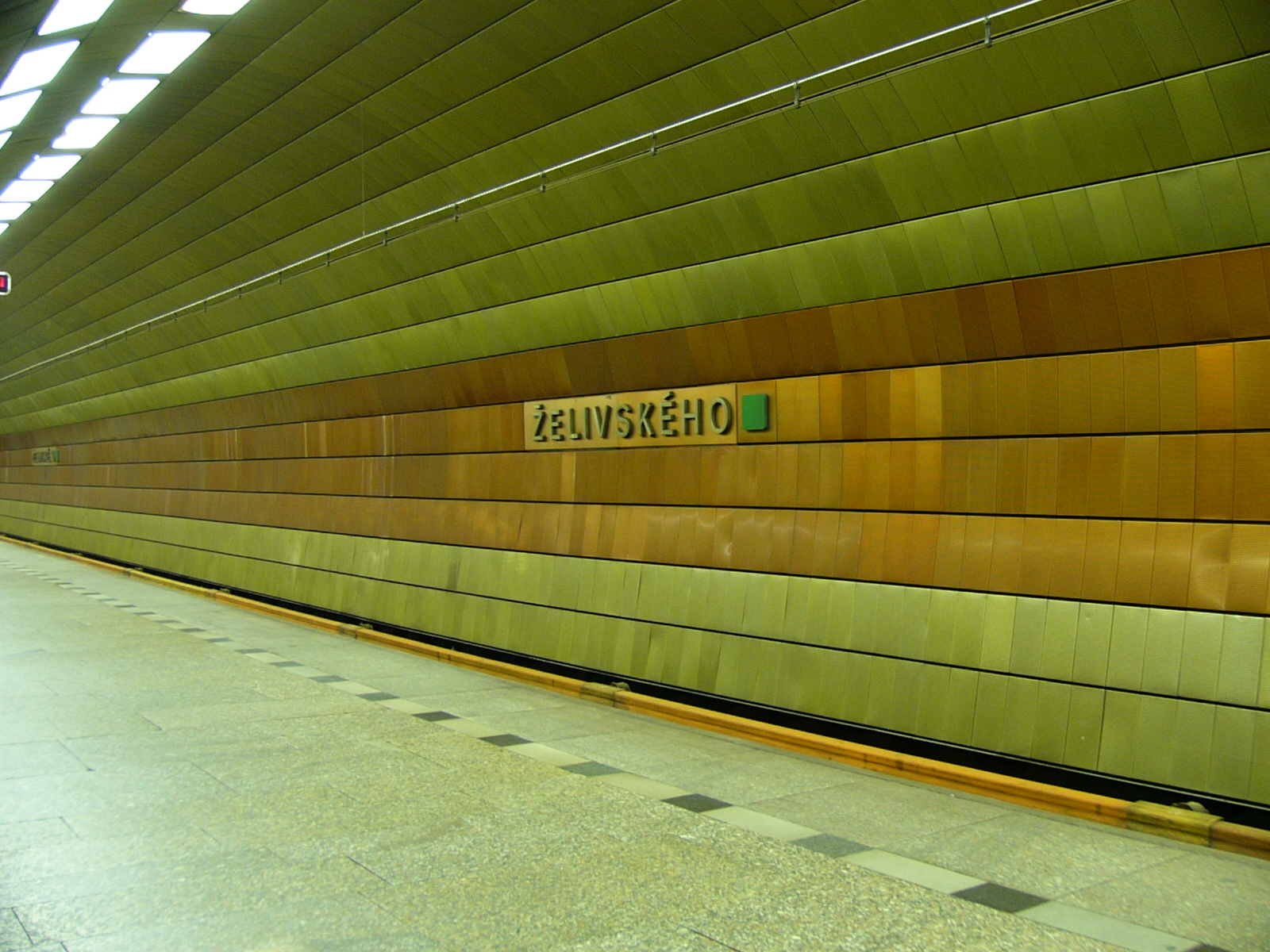
The interior of Želivského Station

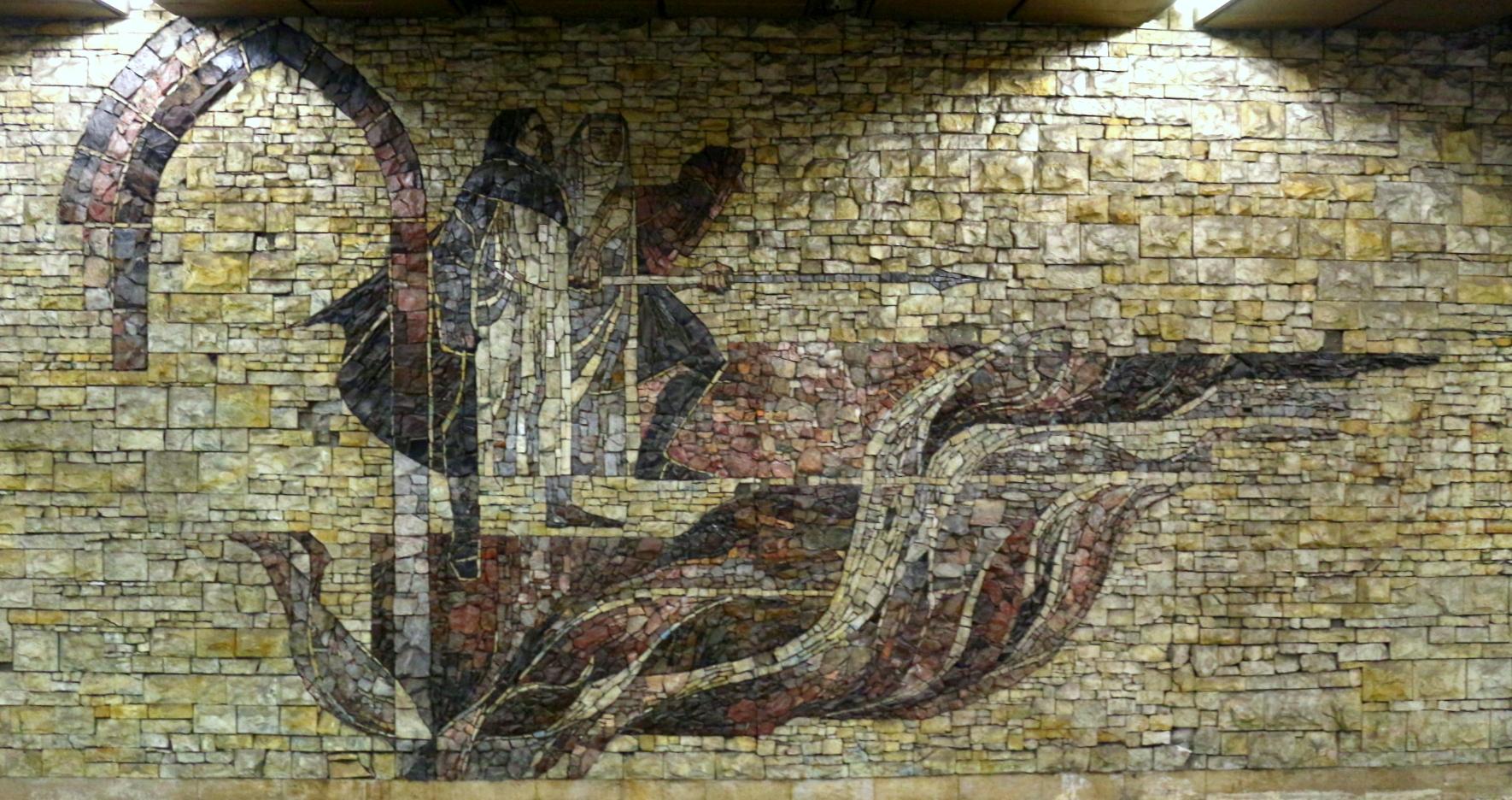
Mosaic by Jiřina Adamcová at the station
