= Hana Sachsová =

Czechoslovak politician (1907–1987)

Member of the Chamber of People
- In office 1969 – 2 February 1970
- Constituency: Vinohrady II

Member of the National Assembly
- In office 14 June 1964 – 31 December 1968
- Constituency: Prague constituency

Personal details
- Born: 17 September 1907; Žižkov, Austria-Hungary
- Died: 14 April 1987 (aged 79)
- Political party: Communist Party of Czechoslovakia

Hana Sachsová (17 September 1907 – 14 April 1987) was a Czechoslovak politician and educator who served as a member of both the National Assembly and the succeeding Federal Assembly. Outside of politics, she served as the director of a secondary general education school and published several books specializing in pedagogy.

== Biography ==
Hana Sachsová was born on 17 September 1907 in Žižkov and educated at the Faculty of Arts, Charles University. In the 1950s and 1960s, she wrote several books on education, most of which specialized in pedagogy or atheist education. As of 1968, she worked as the director of a secondary general education school.

In the 1964 Czechoslovak parliamentary election, Sachsová was elected for the Communist Party of Czechoslovakia (KSČ) to the National Assembly for the Prague constituency. She sat in the National Assembly from 14 June 1964 until the end of the parliamentary term on 31 December 1968. During the Prague Spring, she was part of the party's reform current. In March 1968, she responded to the Rudé právo's poll regarding the resignation of President Antonín Novotný as follows: "I am glad that the situation will finally be resolved, the management will be consolidated and everything progressive that was said these days can be implemented. However, it is necessary to consolidate the government and the Central Committee of the party."

Following the federalization of Czechoslovakia, Sachsová was elected in 1969 to the Chamber of People for Vinohrady II, where she remained until her resignation on 2 February 1970. She died on 14 April 1987.
