= Boroughs in the Czech Republic =

Since the Municipalities Act of 1990, statutory cities in the Czech Republic have been allowed to use the terms city district (Czech: městská část) and city region (Czech: městský obvod) at their discretion to describe self-governing subdivisions of the city. The two terms are legally equivalent. For example, the cities of Brno and Opava term their boroughs "city districts", while Ostrava, Pardubice, Plzeň, and Ústí nad Labem use "city regions". Across the various cities in the Czech Republic, there are 94 city districts as compared to 46 city regions. This act predates the dissolution of Czechoslovakia into the Czech Republic and Slovakia. Slovakia also uses the term city district (Slovak: mestská časť) for its boroughs.

== City Regions in Prague ==
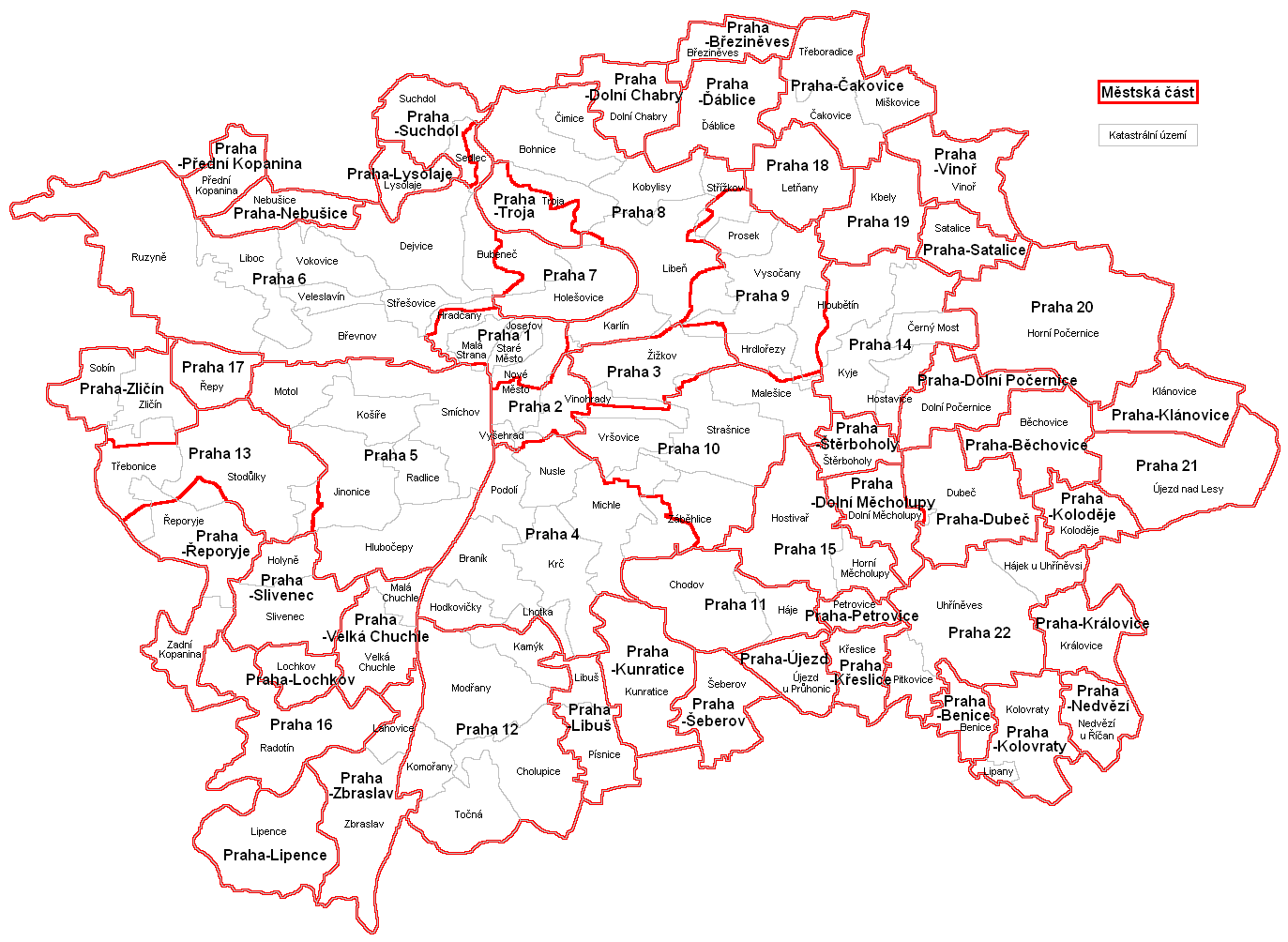
Districts of Prague

In the Capital City of Prague, the term "city region" has special meaning, distinct from its use in other municipalities. According to national Act on The Territorial Division of The State number 36/1960, since July 1, 1960, Prague was divided into ten city regions (Prague 1 through Prague 10). Originally, these regions had their own political power structures, initially national committees, and later district councils and district offices. Since 1988, these authorities have slowly been subsumed by the 57 city districts of Prague. Today, they do not have their own political autonomy, but they sometimes retain certain national-level functions (for example, the city region Prague 3, as distinct from city district Prague 3 (though they are geographically identical at the moment) is the seat of the District Court (Czech: okresní soud) of Prague 3).

== Authority of Boroughs ==
Coat of Arms of the borough of Prague 3

Flag of the borough of Prague 3

The authority of boroughs is broadly similar to, but subject to, the authority of the containing municipality. Boroughs can have their own flags and coats of arms, and can have political structures similar to municipalities (e.g., their own mayor, or city council); however, the establishment and termination of boroughs, in addition to the scope of their self-governance, is determined by municipal decree.
