= Jean Baptiste Mathey =

French painter

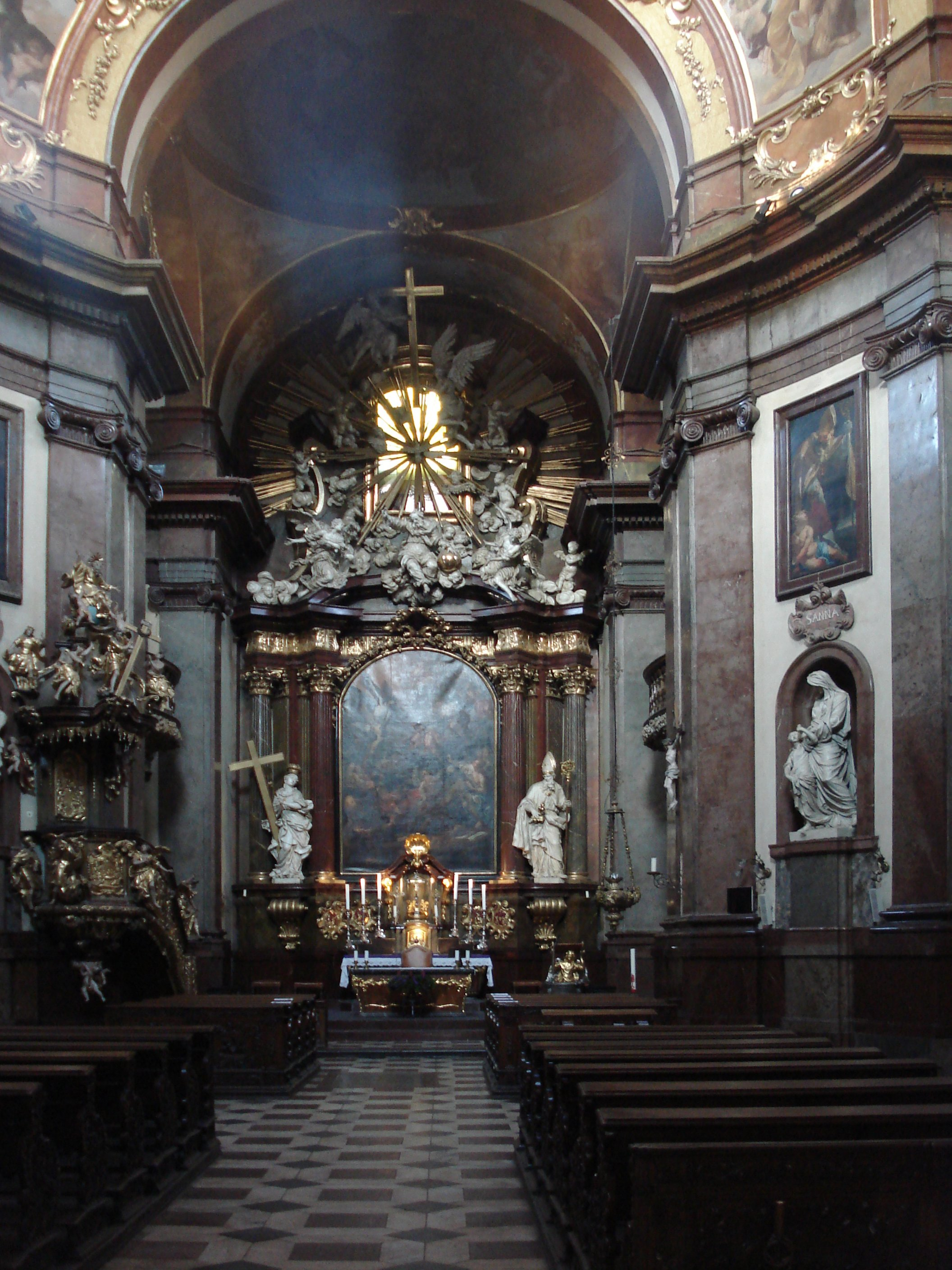
Altar of the church St Francis Seraphin in Old Town, Prague by Jean Baptiste Mathey

Jean Baptiste Mathey (c. 1630 – c. 1695) was a French architect and painter born in Dijon.

Between 1675 and 1694, Mathey worked in Prague. He enjoyed a remarkable career in which his French planning and devotion to classical rationality (as opposed to the luxuriance of Italian Baroque) were a conscious artistic challenge to established taste. Mathey was commissioned by the Archbishop of Prague, Johann Friedrich, to construct the Chateau Troja, which he worked on from 1676 to 1694. In 1679, he also helped design the Kreuzherrenkirche. He received Prague citizenship in 1684 but never joined a guild.

His plans were also probably used for the construction of the Church of Saint Roch in the Prague then-suburb of Žižkov.

Count of Waldstein, later the Archbishop of Prague, was apprised with Mathey and brought him to Duchcov for the purpose of rebuilding the Castle of Dux.
