= Elliptical dome =

Dome who bottom cross section takes the form of an ellipse

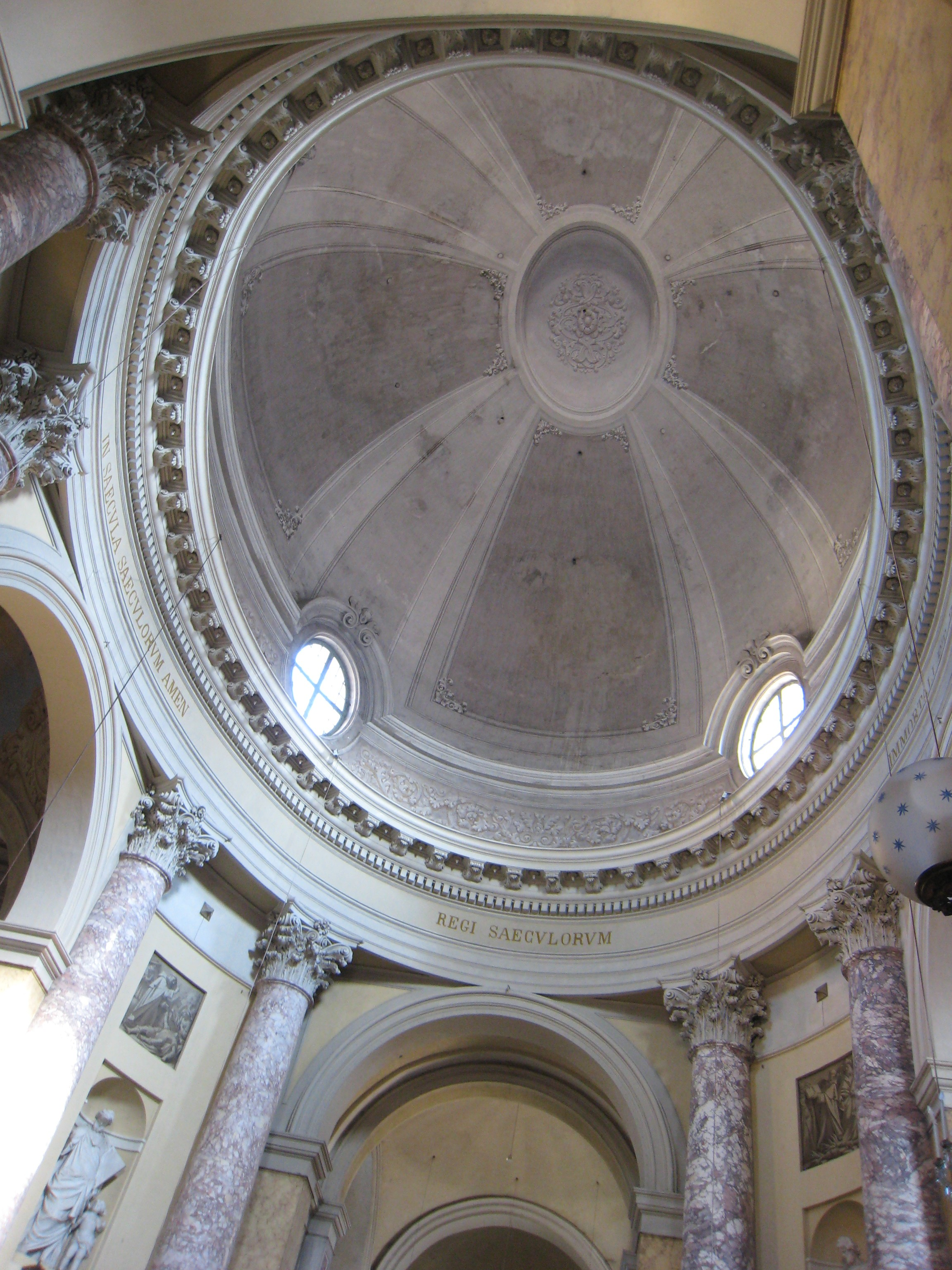
An elliptical dome at the San Domenico, Modena, in Modena, Italy

An elliptical dome, or an oval dome, is a dome whose bottom cross-section takes the form of an ellipse. Technically, an ellipsoidal dome has a circular cross-section, so is not quite the same.

While the cupola can take different geometries, when the ceiling's cross-section takes the form of an ellipse, and due to the reflecting properties of an ellipse, any two persons standing at a focus of the floor's ellipse can have one whisper, and the other hears; this is a whispering gallery.

The largest elliptical dome in the world is at the Sanctuary of Vicoforte in Vicoforte, Italy.

== In architecture ==
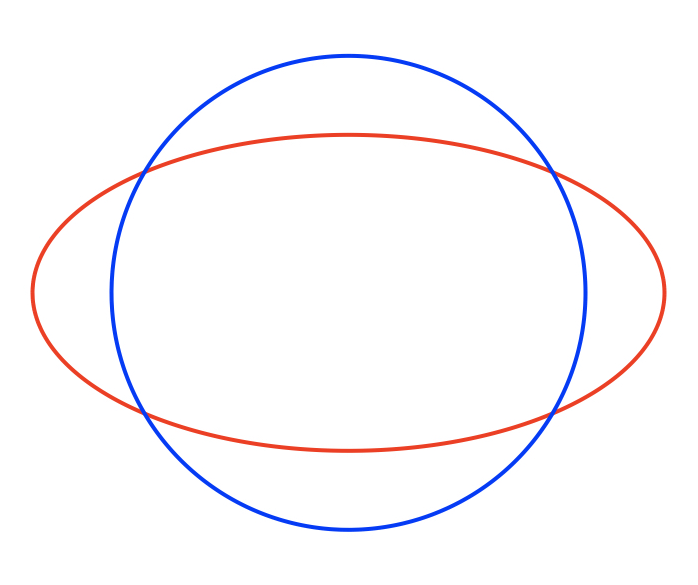
A blue circle, graphed with a red ellipse. An elliptical dome has an elliptical base, and an ellipsoidal dome has a circular base.

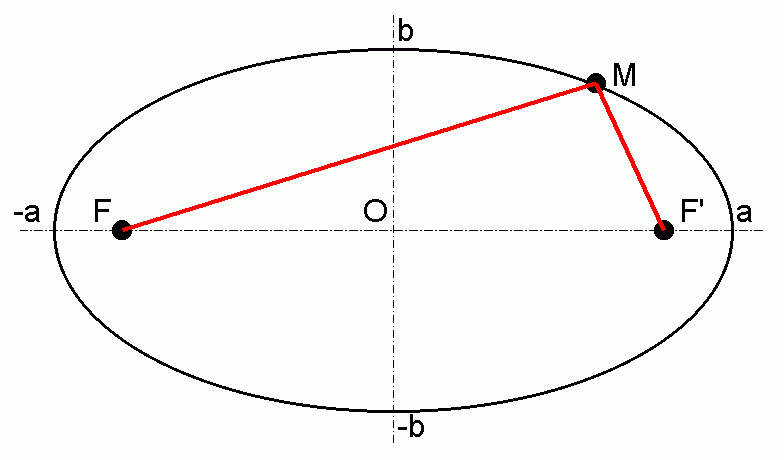
An ellipse, the "reflecting," "whispering gallery" property of the foci F and F' illustrated: The distance from F to F' may be great, but a whisperer at F can be heard, as F'.

Both -a and a are points of the x-axis and -b and b are points on the y-axis

Elliptical domes have many applications in architecture; and are useful in covering rectangular spaces. The oblate, or horizontal elliptical dome is useful when there is a need to limit height of the space that would result from a spherical dome. As the mathematical description of an elliptical dome is more complex than that of spherical dome, design care is needed.

In a geodesic dome with a circular base, the triangular elements align so their edges form great circles. Although not geodesic, a new, elliptical design was patented in 1989; it uses hexagons and pentagons to form a dome with a cross section that is elliptical. Due to its mathematical derivation, this design is called "geotangent".

== World examples ==
Elliptical domes come up in the design of all of the following:

- A number of mosques in Cairo, Egypt,
- Part of St. Peter's Basilica, in Rome, Italy
- The Basilica of St. Lawrence, Asheville, in Asheville, North Carolina,
- The Church of Saint Roch, Žižkov, in Prague, Czech Republic,
- The Four Domes Pavilion, in Wroclaw, Poland,
- The Indiana Theatre, in Indiana, city of Indianapolis,
- The Joe and Rika Mansueto Library, at the University of Chicago,
- The Kanteerava Indoor Stadium, in Bangalore, India,
- The Mayflower Hotel, in Washington, DC,
- The Mosque–Cathedral of Córdoba, in Andalusia,
- The Palau Nacional, in Barcelona, Spain,
- The Pisa Cathedral, in Pisa, Italy,
- The Rose Hill Mansion, Bluffton, in Bluffton, South Carolina,
- The San Filippo Neri, in Turin, region of Piedmont, Italy,
- The Sant'Andrea in Via Flaminia, in Rome, Italy,
- The Santa Caterina, Casale Monferrato, in Casale Monferrato, Province of Alessandria, region of Piedmont, Italy,
- The Seville Cathedral, Spain,
- The Skyspace Lech, Tannegg/Oberlech in Vorarlberg, the westernmost federal state of Austria,
- The State Savings Bank Building, in City of Sydney, Australia,
- The Temple Sinai, in Oakland, California,
- The Sanctuary of Vicoforte, in Italy,
- BAPS Swaminarayan Akshardham (New Jersey), in Robbinsville, New Jersey.

== See also ==
- Pendentive
- Beehive house
- Beehive tomb
- Catenary arch
- Clochán
- Ellipsoid
- Onion dome
- Parabolic arch

== External links and references ==
=== Creating elliptical domes ===
- Elliptical domes site
- Creating an elliptical dome
- Another reference, on creating ellitpical domes

=== Calculations ===
- Site for calculating figures related to elliptical domes
- Another site for calculations
- Dome calculator

=== More general references ===
- Buckling of Externally Pressurized Prolate Ellipsoidal Domes
- An article addressing many topics, including elliptical domes
- Use of elliptical domes, notably in Islamic architecture
