= Prague 3 =

Municipality in the Czech Republic

Prague 3 Praha 3
- Municipal District of Prague; Administrative District of Prague
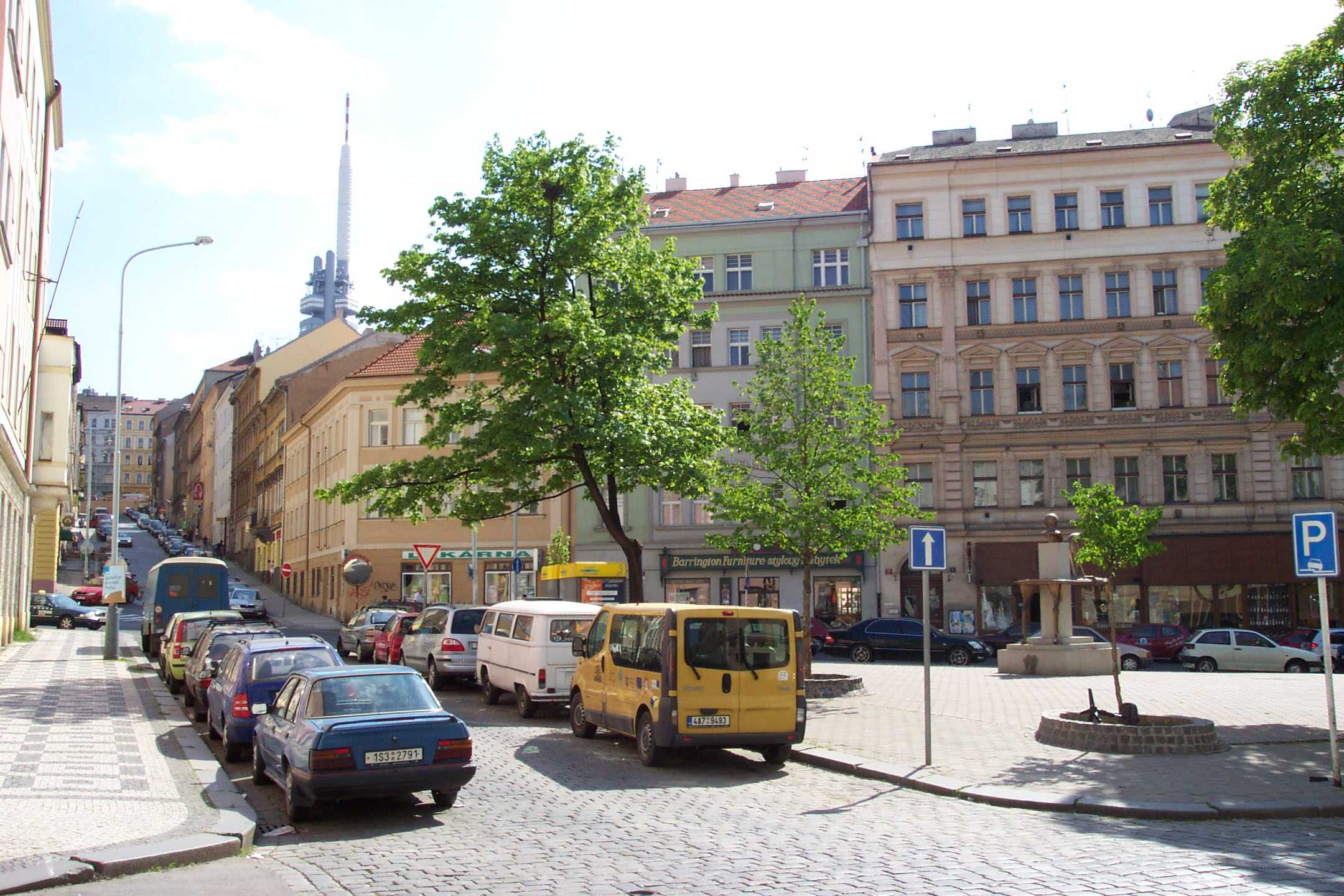
- Prokopovo náměstí (Prokop Square)

- Flag Coat of arms Logo

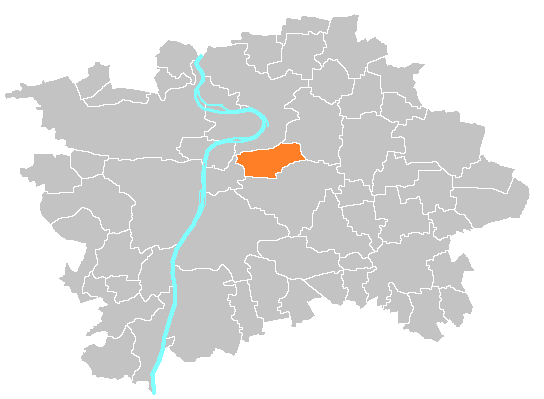
- Location of Prague 3 in Prague
- Coordinates: 50°5′4″N 14°27′15″E
- Country: Czech Republic
- Region: Prague

Government
  - Mayor: Michal Vronský (TOP 09)

Area
  - Total: 6.49 km^{2} (2.51 sq mi)

Population (2021)
  - Total: 74,307
  - Density: 11,400/km^{2} (29,700/sq mi)
- Time zone: UTC+1 (CET)
  - Summer (DST): UTC+2 (CEST)
- Postal code: 130 00
- Website: http://www.praha3.cz

Prague 3 (formally the Prague 3 Municipal District, Czech: Městská část Praha 3), is a second-tier municipality in Prague. It is geographically identical to the national administrative district (správní obvod) and city administrative district (městský obvod) of the same name.

The district includes most of the cadastral area of Žižkov and parts of Vinohrady, Vysočany and Strašnice. The district area has remained intact since its creation in 1960.

Like many districts of the city, Prague 3 is socioeconomically diverse. The western part of Žižkov is known for its high concentration of brothels, strip clubs and cheap bars. Yet only a short distance away are nice apartments and a shopping mall.

Two of Prague's most-visible landmarks are in Prague 3: the National Monument on the Vítkov hill, with its giant equestrian statue of Jan Žižka; and the 216 metre-high Žižkov Tower, Prague's tallest structure. The large Olšany Cemetery take up much of the district. A New Jewish Cemetery nearby, one of two historic Jewish burial places in the district, contains the grave of Bohemian-German writer Franz Kafka.

== Demographics ==
Historical population

Year	Pop.	±%
1869	4,336	—
1880	21,212	+389.2%
1890	41,236	+94.4%
1900	59,326	+43.9%
1910	72,173	+21.7%

Year	Pop.	±%
1921	71,766	−0.6%
1930	93,098	+29.7%
1950	90,234	−3.1%
1961	124,035	+37.5%
1970	112,146	−9.6%

Year	Pop.	±%
1980	92,338	−17.7%
1991	81,927	−11.3%
2001	72,840	−11.1%
2011	71,769	−1.5%
2021	74,307	+3.5%

Source: Censuses

== See also ==
- Districts of Prague#Symbols
