= Babies (Černý) =

Sculpture series by Czech artist David Černý

- Miminka (Czech)
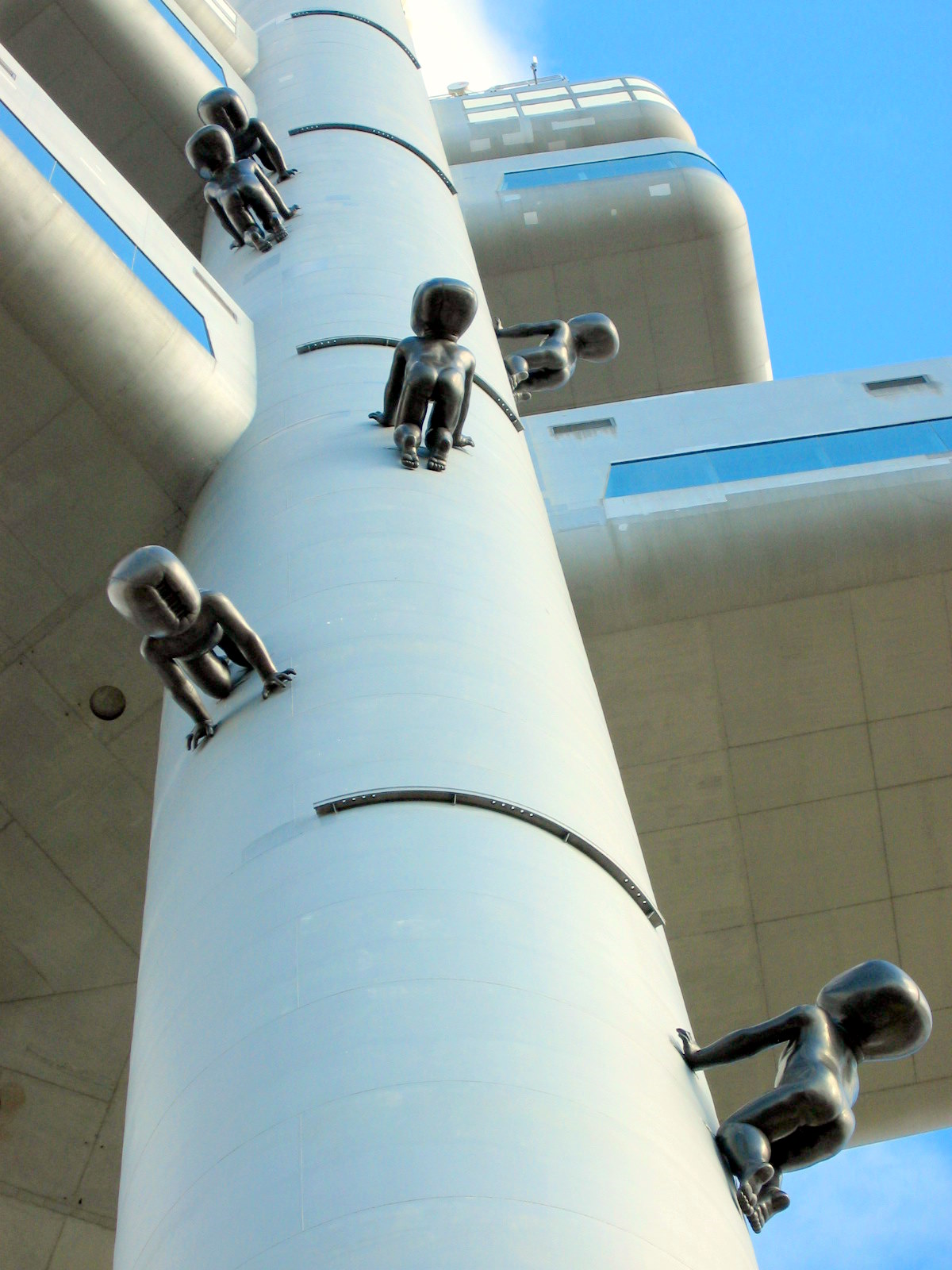
- Sculptures on the exterior of Prague's Žižkov Television Tower, 2004
- Artist: David Černý

Babies (Czech: Miminka) is a series of sculptures by Czech artist David Černý.

== History and description ==
The piece consists of several sculptures depicting babies, which are 350 cm long and 260 cm high. Their faces are replaced with bar code stamps. The first baby was presented in 1994 at the Museum of Contemporary Art in Chicago. Later it was exhibited in many places around the world.

== Installations ==
=== Žižkov Television Tower ===
In 2000, a ten-piece series made of fiberglass was installed on the exterior of Prague's Žižkov Television Tower as a temporary installation for the European Capital of Culture year. Each piece weighs about 190 kg. Due to the public's appreciation of the sculptures, in 2001, they were installed on the tower permanently. The sculptures were removed in 2017 with the intention of repair. Due to safety reasons, new 250 kg copies, that are more durable and better attachable to the tower, were made to replace the original series, which was returned to Černý. The new copies were installed on the tower in April 2019.

=== Kampa Island ===
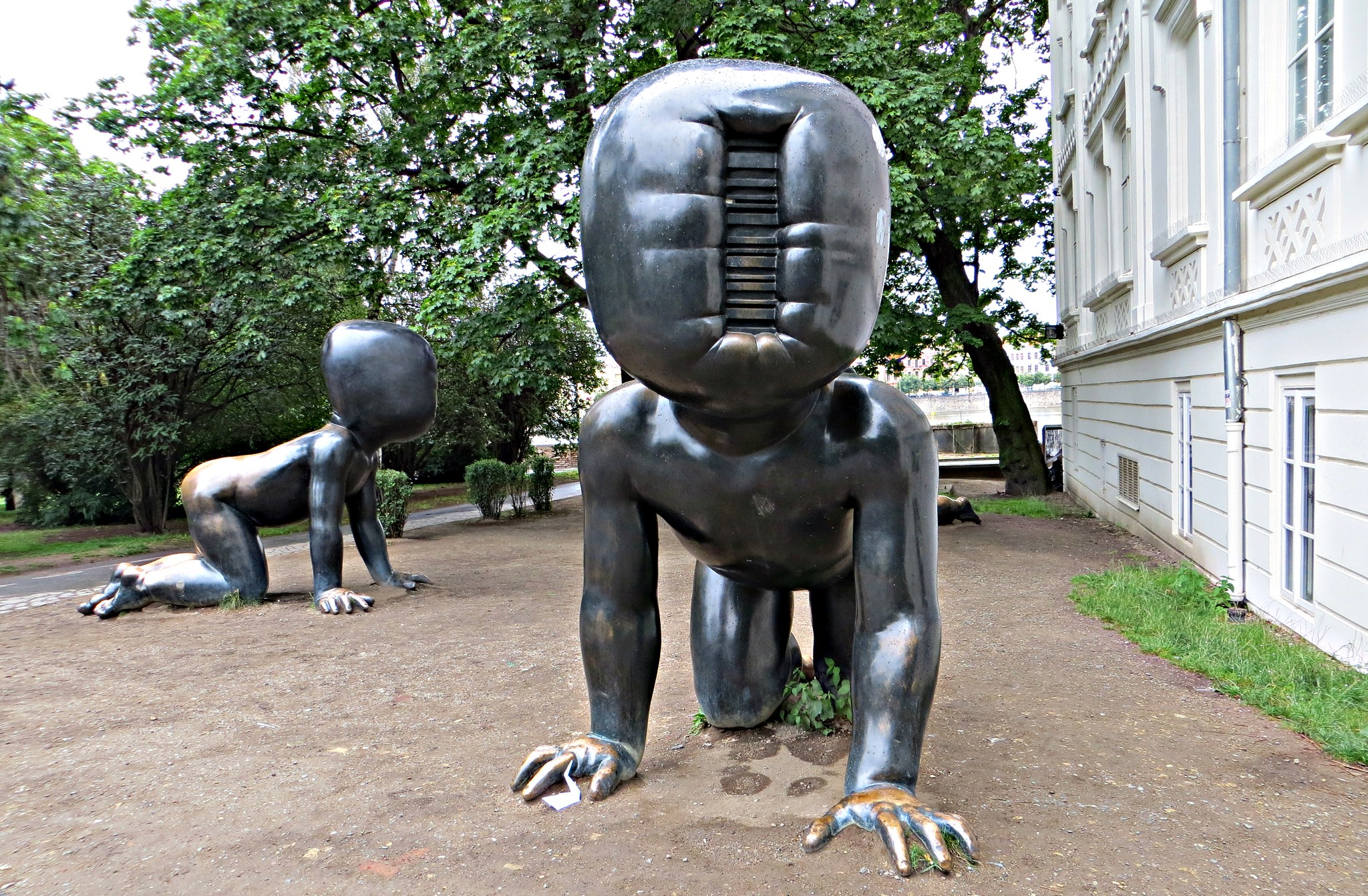
Bronze sculptures installed outside Museum Kampa, 2015

In 2008 an eight-piece bronze series was installed on Kampa Island.

=== Palm Springs, California ===
In 2018 the ten-piece original series that was removed from the tower was loaned to Palm Springs for 2 years.

=== Casino Blankenberge ===
Černý's babies were also installed on the wall of the Gevel Casino in Blankenberge, Belgium, in 2006.
