= Žižkov Television Tower =

TV tower in Prague, Czech Republic

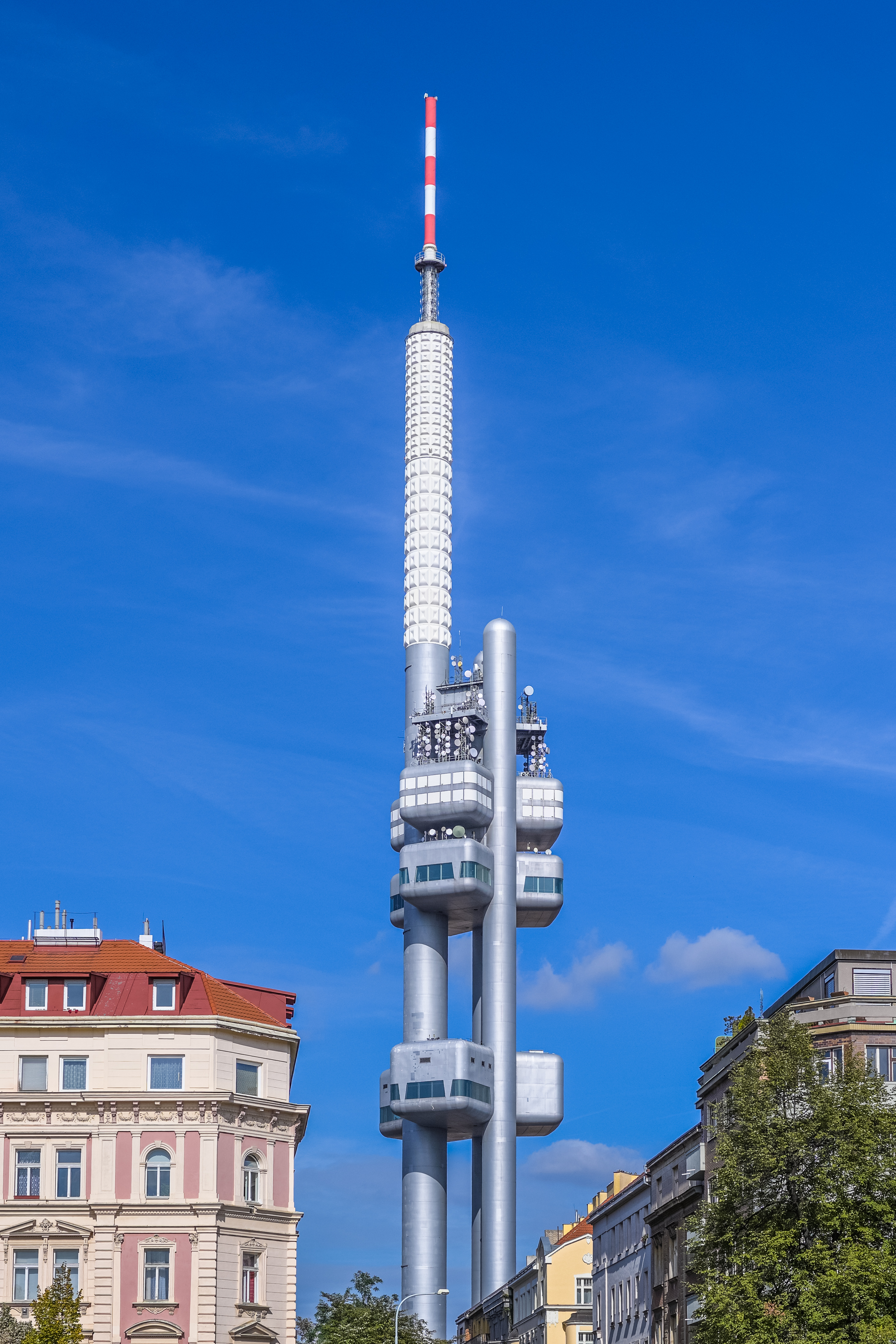

General information
- Architectural style: Structural expressionism
- Location: Prague, Czech Republic
- Coordinates: 50°04′51″N 14°27′05″E
- Construction started: 1985
- Completed: 1992

Height
- Antenna spire: 216 metres

Design and construction
- Architect: Václav Aulický
- Structural engineer: Jiří Kozák

Website
- towerpark.cz

The Žižkov Television Tower (Czech: Žižkovský vysílač) is a transmitter tower built in Prague between 1985 and 1992. Designed by the architect Václav Aulický and the structural engineer Jiří Kozák, it stands high above the city's traditional skyline from its position on top of a hill in the district of Žižkov, from which it takes its name. The tower is an example of high-tech architecture.

== Characteristics ==
The structure of the tower is unconventional, based on a triangle whose corners go up in steel columns, consisting of three tubes with a double steel wall, filled with concrete. They support nine 'pods' and three decks for transmitting equipment. One of the three pillars extends considerably higher than the others, providing both the necessary height for radio antennas and the structure's rocket and gantry appearance. In its time it was a unique technology, which authors have patented.

The tower stands 216 metres (709 feet) high, with the observatory at 93 metres, the hotel room at 70 metres, restaurants (with a capacity of 180 people) at 66 metres. Three elevators transport passengers at a speed of 4 m/s.

Three of the pods, positioned directly beneath the decks at the top, are used for equipment and are inaccessible to the public. The remaining six pods are open to visitors, providing a panoramic view of Prague and the surrounding area. The lower three, approximately half-way up the length of the pillars at 63 metres (207 feet), house a restaurant and café bar.

Construction of the tower cost $19 million. It weighs 11,800 tonnes and is also used as a meteorological observatory. It is a member of the World Federation of Great Towers.

Since 2006, to mark the 125th anniversary of the elevation of Žižkov into a city and the 15th anniversary of the commissioning of the transmitter, the transmitter is illuminated in different colors every evening, usually in the colors of the state tricolor.

After switching to digital TV broadcasting and removing the old analogue broadcast equipment by 2012, the owner decided to use the free space for a new colocation datacenter.

On 13 February 2013 a luxury one room hotel was added to the tower. The room sits upstairs from the reopened restaurant and a spiral staircase provides private access. Inside the room is a large bed and a free standing bathtub from where the guest can view the city.

== David Černý sculptures ==
In 2000, ten fiberglass sculptures by Czech artist David Černý called "Miminka" (Babies), crawling up and down were temporarily attached to the tower's pillars. The sculptures were returned in 2001 as a permanent installation. Another three Babies, made from bronze, can be found in Prague's Kampa Park. For cleaning and structural checks, these Babies were removed from the tower in 2017. After examination of the condition of the sculptures, they were replaced with identical duplicates, which were installed on their original positions in 2019. The original Babies were returned to David Černý.

== Reception ==
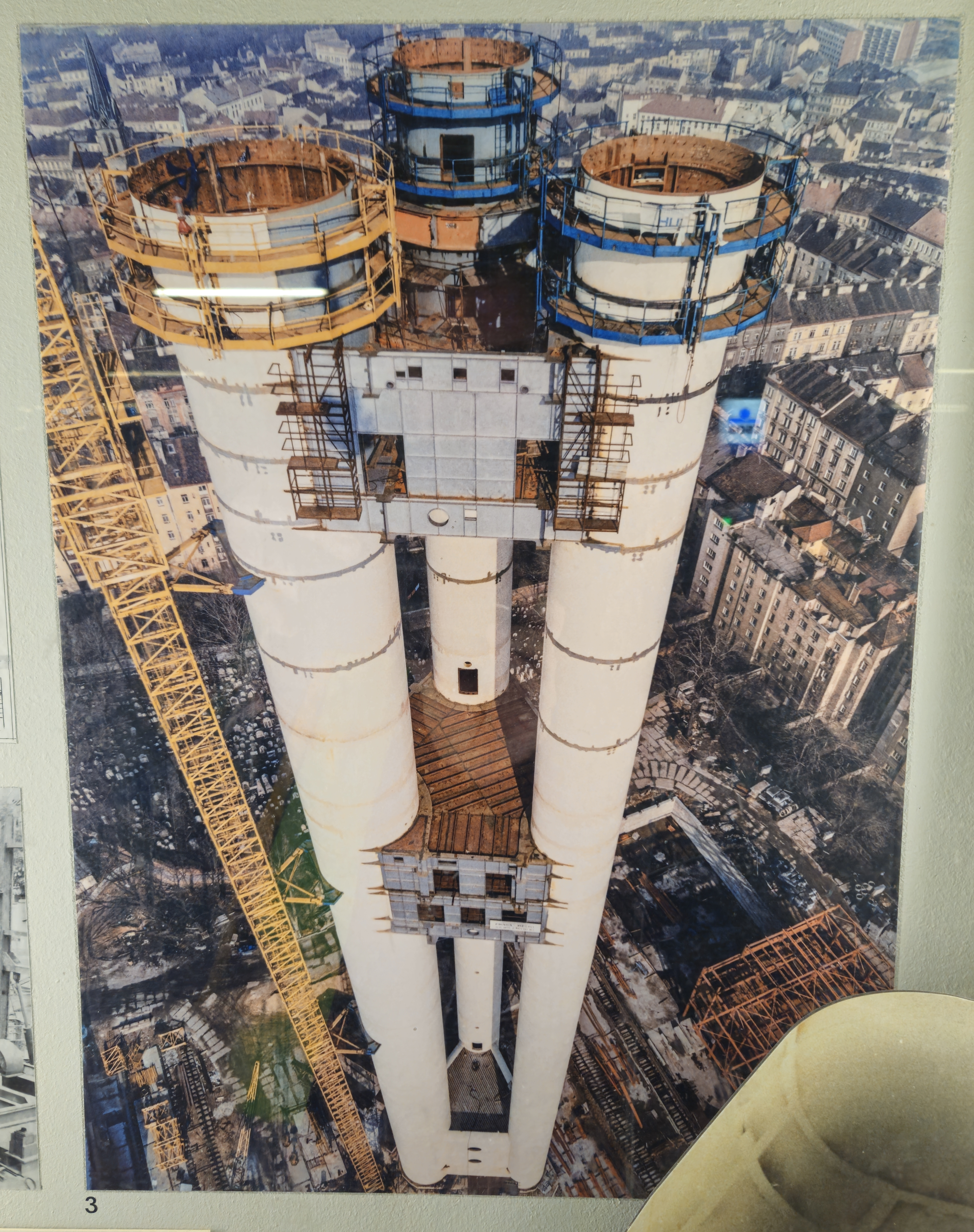
Photo taken during the construction.

Although official criticism during the time of its construction was impossible, the tower was lambasted unofficially for its 'megalomania', its 'jarring' effect on the Prague skyline and for destroying part of a centuries-old Jewish cemetery situated at the tower's foundations. The tower's foundation was simply dug up through the layer of the cemetery, tombstones were crushed by heavy equipment and the bones were carried away to landfill. The tower received a spate of nicknames, mostly alluding to its rocket-like shape, like "Baikonur", after the Soviet cosmodrome or "Jakeš's finger" ("Jakešův prst"), after the then-Secretary General of the Czechoslovak Communist Party.

In recent years, the tower's reputation among Czechs has improved and the crawling Babies (together with the statue Piss by the same author) were published by The Guardian in 2007 as the greatest attraction of Prague.

== See also ==
- List of towers
