= Josef Dobrovský =

Czech historian and philologist (1753–1829)

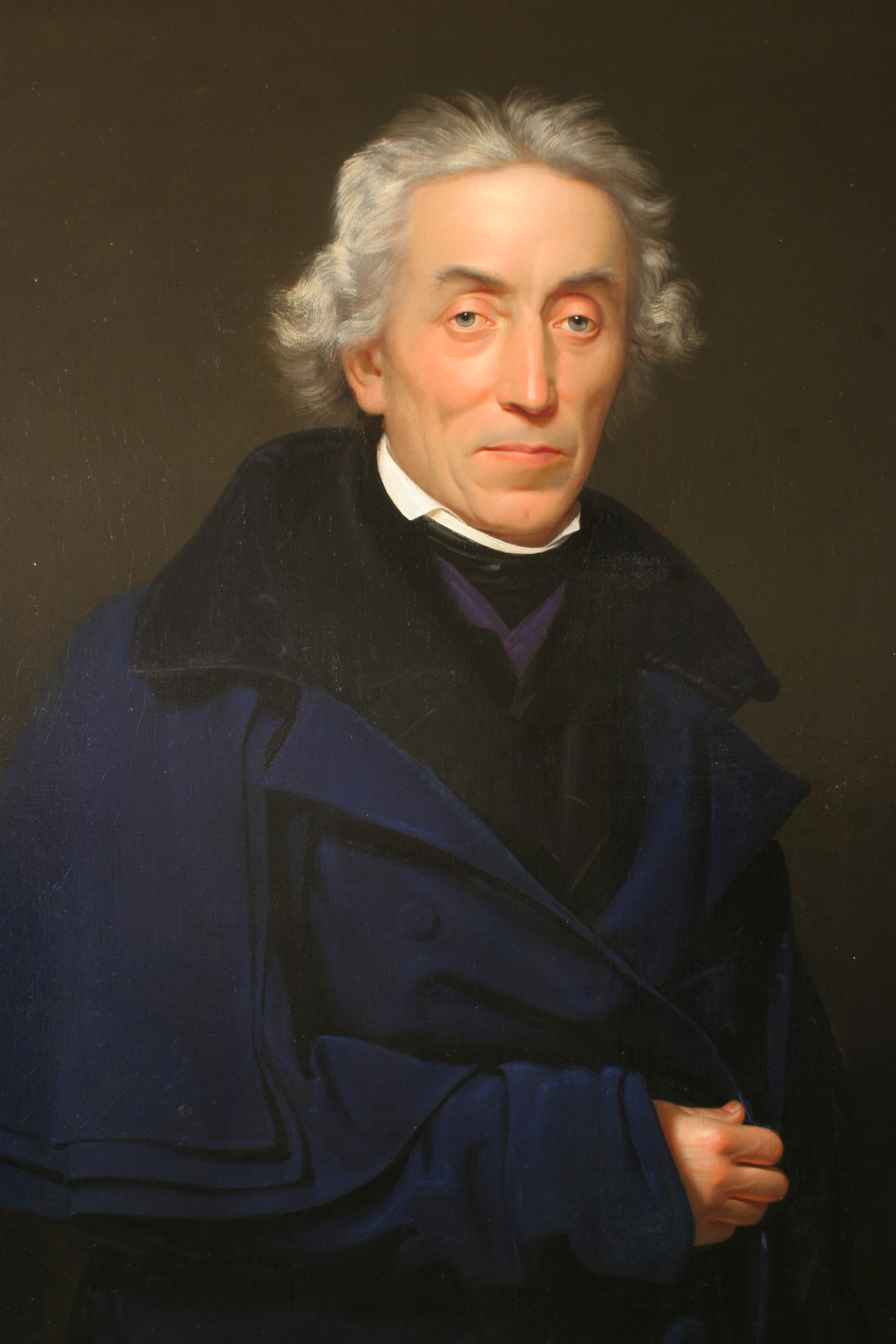
- Josef Dobrovský by František Tkadlík
- Born: 17 August 1753; Balassagyarmat, Kingdom of Hungary, Habsburg monarchy
- Died: 6 January 1829 (aged 75); Brno, Moravia, Austrian Empire

Philosophical work
- Main interests: philology, history

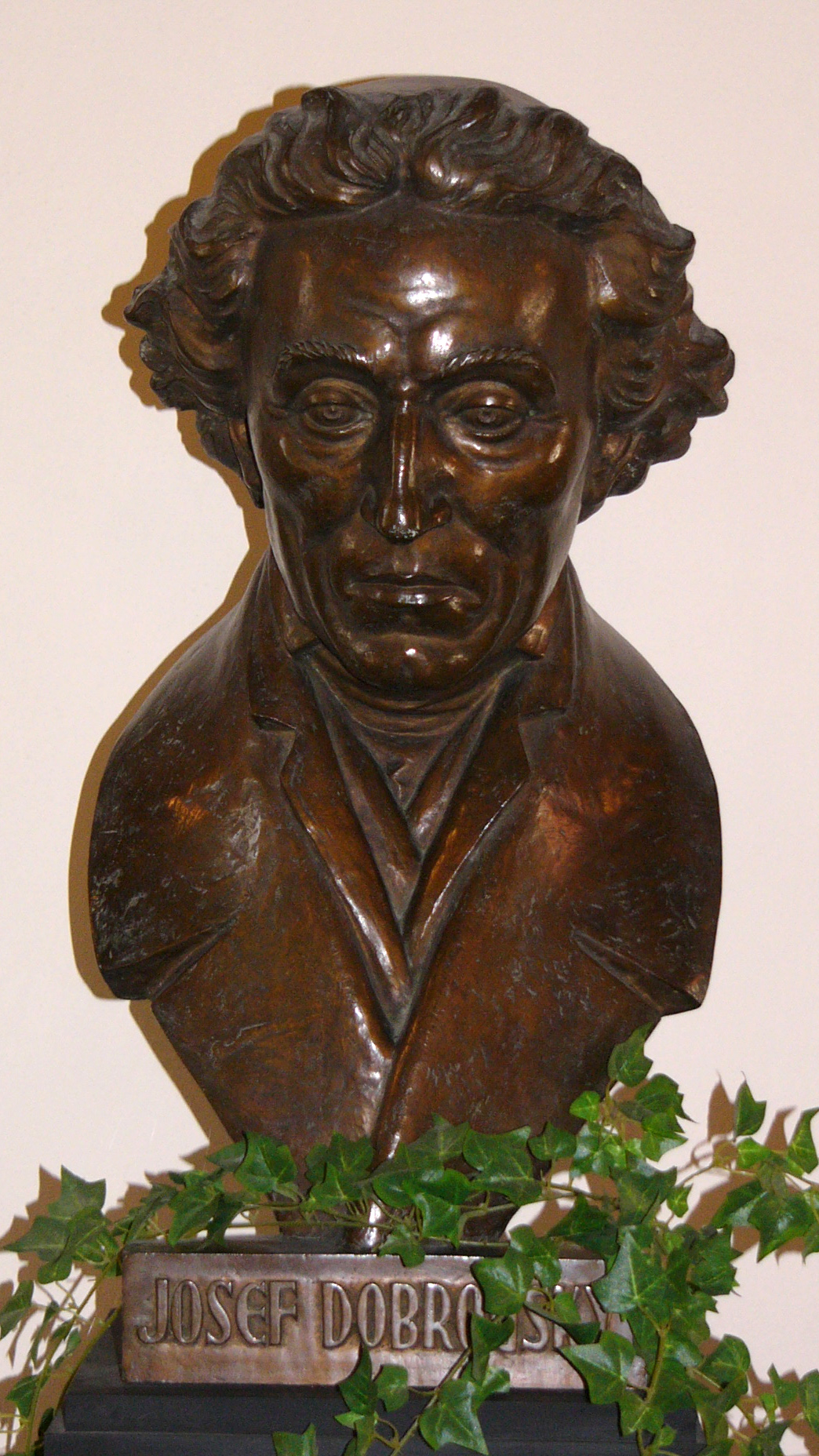
Bust of Josef Dobrovský

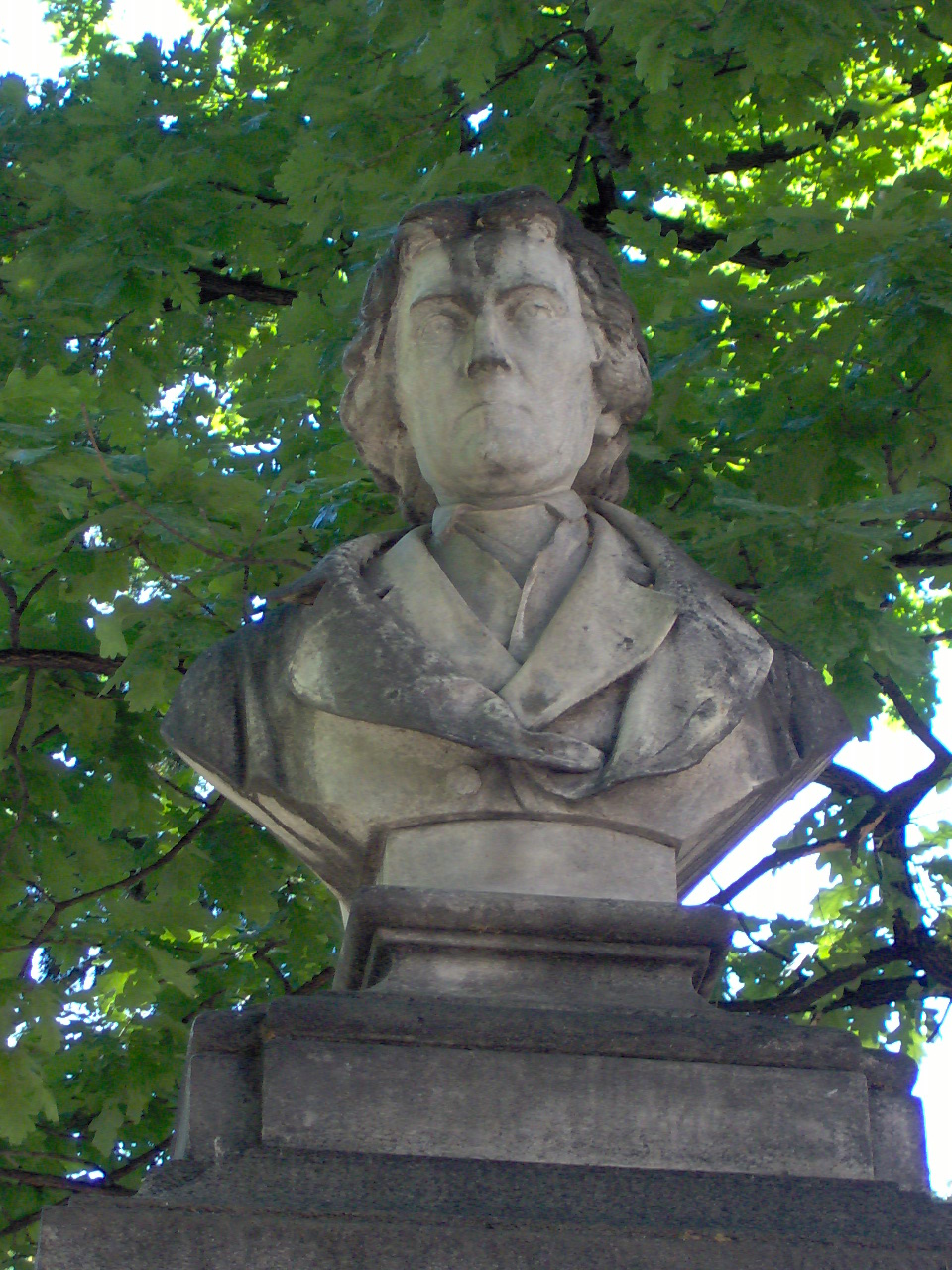
Dobrovský's bust on Kampa Island in Prague

Josef Dobrovský (17 August 1753 – 6 January 1829) was a Czech philologist and historian. He was one of the most important figures of the Czech National Revival along with Josef Jungmann.

== Life and work ==
Dobrovský was born at Balassagyarmat in Nógrád County, Kingdom of Hungary, when his father Jakub Doubravský was temporarily stationed as a soldier there. His mother was Magdalena Doubravská, née Wannerová. Due to an error in the vital record, his surname was permanently changed to Dobrovský.

He received his first education in the German school at Horšovský Týn, made his first acquaintance with the Czech language and soon made himself fluent in it at the Německý Brod gymnasium, and then studied for some time under the Jesuits at Klatovy. In 1769 he began to study philosophy at the University of Prague. In 1772 he was admitted among the Jesuits at Brno and was preparing for a Christian mission in India. However, the entire order was dissolved in the Czech lands in 1773 and Dobrovský thus returned to Prague to study theology.

After holding for some time the office of tutor to Count Nostitz, he obtained an appointment first as vice-rector, and then as rector, in the general seminary at Hradisko (now part of Olomouc); but in 1790 he lost his post through the abolition of the seminaries throughout the Habsburg Empire, and returned as a guest to the house of the count. At this time, he wrote some of the most important works in Slavic studies, historiography and philology.

In 1792 he was commissioned by the Bohemian Academy of Sciences to visit Stockholm, Turku, Saint Petersburg and Moscow in search of the manuscripts that had been scattered by the Thirty Years' War, and on his return he accompanied Count Nostitz to Switzerland and Italy.

In the 1780s, Dobrovský participated in the academic life of Prague. In 1784, he helped to set up the Royal Czech Society of Sciences, and in 1818 the National Museum of what was to become Czechoslovakia and eventually the Czech Republic.

However, his reason began to give way in 1795, and in 1801 he had to be confined in a lunatic asylum, but by 1803 he had completely recovered. The rest of his life was mainly spent either in Prague or at the country seats of his friends Counts Nostitz and Czernin, but his death occurred in Brno, where he had gone in 1828 to study in the local libraries.

== Legacy ==
Dobrovský remains a revered figure of Czechoslovak intellectual history. He has been subject to philosophical analysis, for instance by Milan Machovec (in his 1964 monograph).

While his fame rests chiefly on his labors in Slavic philology his botanical studies are not without value in the history of the science.

Between 1948 and 1968, Czech poet Vladimír Holan lived in the so-called "Dobrovský House" on Kampa, often saying that the Blue Abbé (a nickname by which Dobrovský was known) would sometimes visit him.

== Most important works ==
- Fragmentum Pragense evangelii S. Marci, vulgo autographi (1778)
- a periodical for Bohemian and Moravian literature (1780–1787)
- Scriptores rerum Bohemicarum (2 vols., 1783)
- Geschichte der böhm. Sprache und alten Literatur (1792)
- Die Bildsamkeit der slaw. Sprache (1799)
- a Deutsch-böhm. Wörterbuch compiled in collaboration with Leschk, Puchmayer and Hanka (1802–1821)
- Entwurf eines Pflanzensystems nach Zahlen und Verhältnissen (1802)
- Glagolitica (1807)
- Lehrgebäude der böhmischen Sprache (1809)
- Institutiones linguae slavicae dialecti veteris (1822)
- Entwurf zu einem allgemeinen Etymologikon der slaw. Sprachen (1813)
- Slowanka zur Kenntnis der slaw. Literatur (1814)
- a critical edition of Jordanes, De rebus Geticis, for Pertz's Monumenta Germaniae Historica

See Palacký, J. Dobrowskys Leben und gelehrtes Wirken (1833).

== See also ==
- List of Jesuit scientists
- Josef Dobrovský Monument
