= Josef Dobrovský Monument =

Sculpture in Prague, Czech Republic

- Pomník Josefa Dobrovského (Czech)
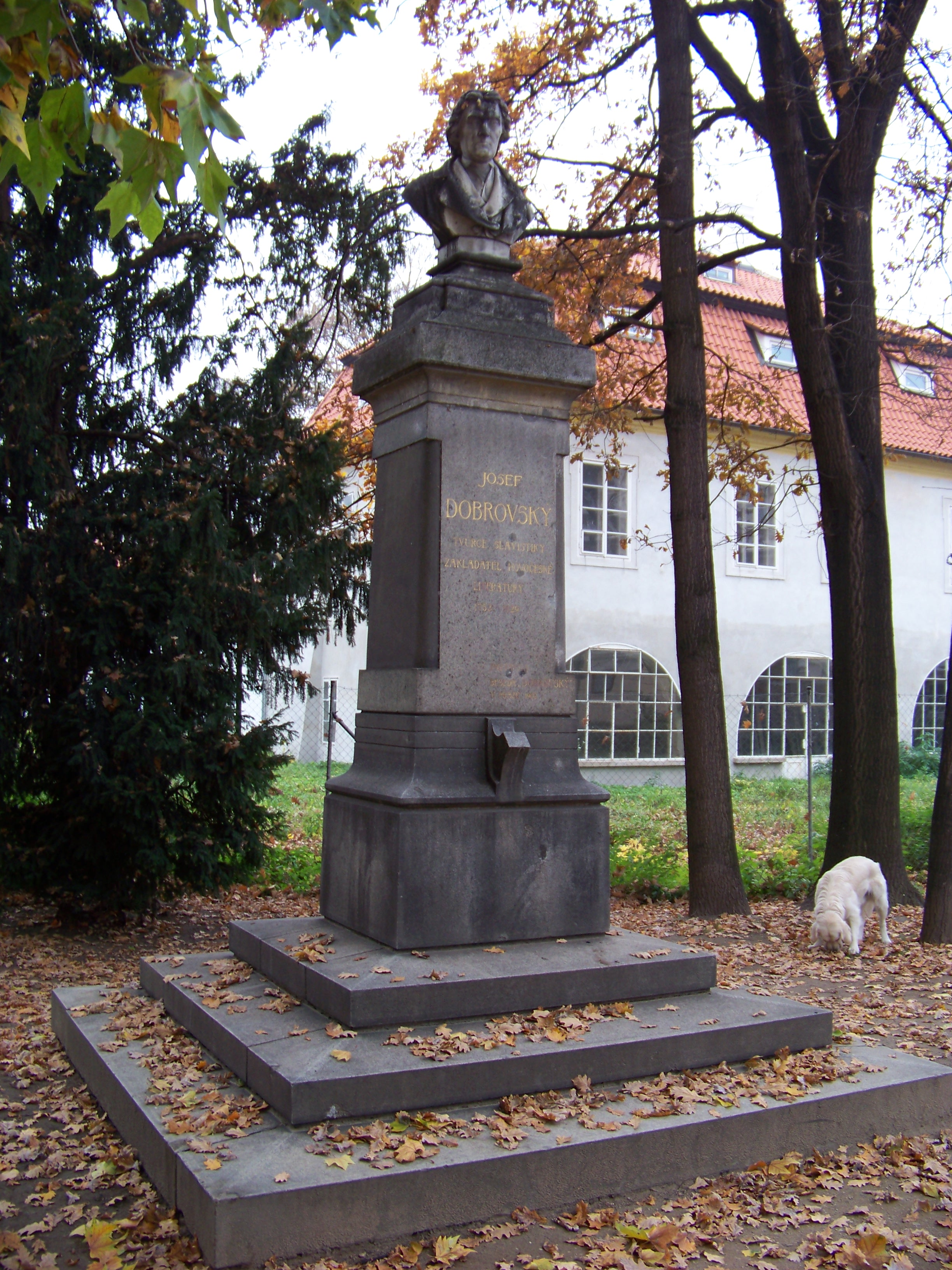
- The monument in 2011
- Artist: Tomáš Seidan
- Location: Prague, Czech Republic; 50°5′7.35″N 14°24′29.69″E

Josef Dobrovský Monument (Czech: Pomník Josefa Dobrovského) is an outdoor monument commemorating Josef Dobrovský, installed at Kampa Park in Malá Strana, Prague, Czech Republic. It consists of a large base and a bust, which was designed by Tomáš Seidan in 1890. The monument was first revealed in Vrchlického sady near Prague main train station. After World War II, it was moved to the Kampa Park, next to Werichova vila, which is a house, where Dobrovský spent his pension.
