= HB Reavis =

European real estate developer

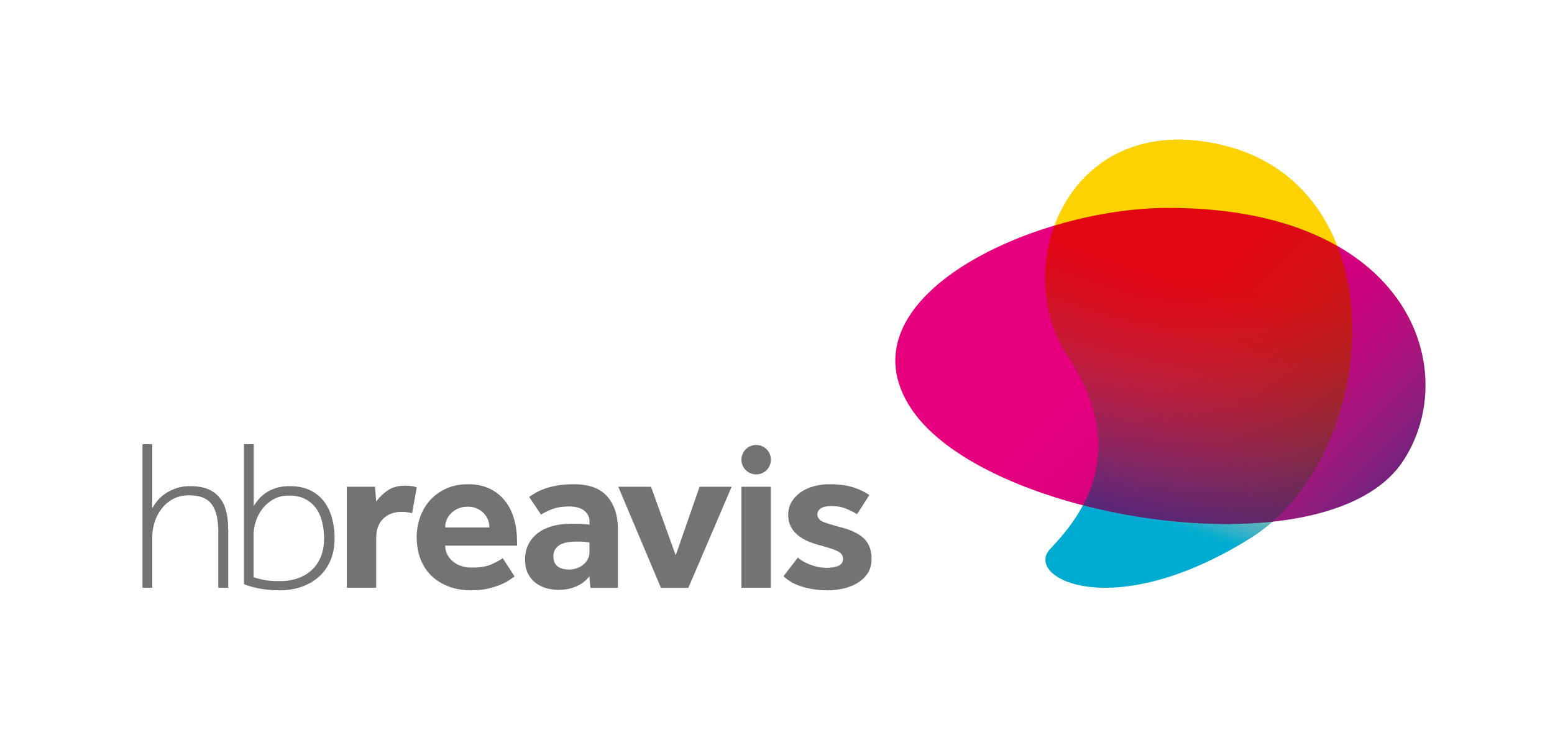
- Type: Private
- Industry: real estate development
- Founded: 1993
- Founder: Ivan Chrenko
- Headquarters: Luxembourg
- Area served: Slovakia, Poland, United Kingdom, Czech Republic, Germany and Hungary
- Key people: Marian Herman (CEO)
- Total assets: $2.59 billion (31 December 2017)
- Website: hbreavis.com

HB Reavis is a real estate developer company active mainly in Slovakia, Poland, United Kingdom, Czech Republic, Hungary and Germany. The company is active both in development of new projects and asset management of existing portfolio.

== History ==
HB Reavis was established in 1993 in Bratislava, Slovakia. The parent company of the group is based in Luxembourg. Slovak businessman Ivan Chrenko is majority owner, co-founder, chairman of the board and former CEO (1994-2013). Current CEO is Marian Herman, who replaced Pavel Trenka in 2018.

In Germany, HB Reavis worked on the development of the DSTRCT project in Berlin at Landsberger Allee 104 opposite the Velodrom, which completed in 2021. It is part of the Alter Schlachthof development area and includes a renovation of the former pig slaughterhouses of the central cattle and slaughterhouse. In September 2019, HB Reavis announced that the Berlin internet service provider Strato would move its headquarters to the new building complex after completion. In Poland, HB Reavis invested in the high-rise projects Varso Tower and Forest.

== Projects ==
- 33 Central
- Cooper & Southwark
- Elizabeth House
- 20 Farringdon
- Nivy Tower
- Stanica Nivy
- Varso Place
- Agora Budapest

=== Vinohradská 8 ===
Vinohradská 8 is a project of administrative and living houses at the former site of Transgas complex, Prague, the Czech Republic. HB Reavis bought two out of three buildings of the complex in 2014 and decide to demolish them, to be able to replace them by new constructions designed by Jakub Cigler Architects. After the announcement of the intention to demolish the complex of buildings, a wave of resistance arose among experts and laymen. The Club for Old Prague submitted a proposal for the declaration of Transgas as a cultural monument, but it failed. At the end of 2019, most of the structures had already been demolished.

== Research ==
- Cambridge Innovation Center (CIC) - HB Reavis has given funding of $58 million to Cambridge Innovation Center (CIC) to expand its coworking spaces globally. CIC campuses are essentially a mix of startups, “corporate innovation spin-outs,” and VC funds, with tenants given access to desks, meeting rooms, labs, and more.
- Well Living Lab - HB Reavis has joined the Well Living Lab as a founding member of the lab's global alliance. The lab is pioneering research on the connection between health, well-being and indoor environments.

== Events ==
- Venture into Proptech - HB Reavis hosted an event to promote and showcase proptech startups in December 2019 with three startups winning the opportunity to pilot their solution at the HB Reavis HQ location in Bratislava, and one startup winning a £10,000 cash prize as well as one year of free office space.
