= Transgas (building) =

Demolished structure in Prague

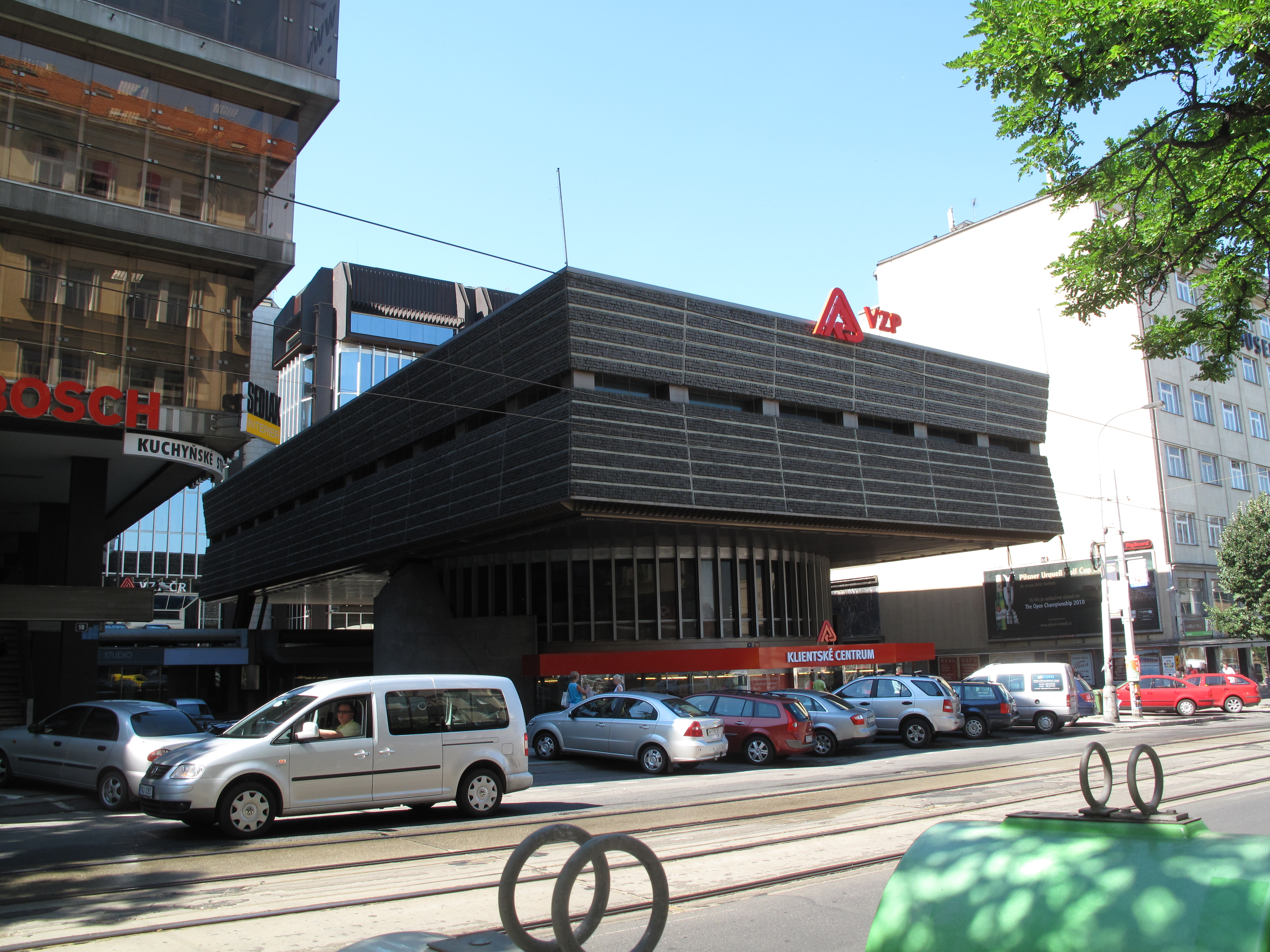
- Originally control room

- Location within Czech Republic
- Former names: Transgaz, Budovy Ústředního dispečinku tranzitního plynovodu, Světové odborové federace, Federálního ministerstva paliv a energetiky

General information
- Status: Demolished
- Architectural style: high tech, brutalism
- Location: Prague, Czech Republic, Czech Republic
- Coordinates: 50°4′42″N 14°25′59″E
- Elevation: 225 m (738 ft)
- Construction started: 1972
- Completed: 1978
- Inaugurated: 1978
- Demolished: 2019–2020
- Client: Czechoslovak government
- Owner: HB Reavis

Design and construction
- Architects: Jiří Eisenreich, Jindřich Malátek, Václav Aulický
- Other designers: Ivo Loos

Transgas was a high tech building with brutalist elements in the center of Prague, Czech Republic. It was built in 1978 and demolished in 2019. It consisted of a cubic part, which was dark grey. Its facade was covered by small cobble stones. The other two buildings were high with long windows and steel dark construction. The surrounding decoration is symbolically was out of gas pipeline tubes.

== History ==
The building was commissioned by the Czechoslovak government, which agreed in 1970 to build a pipeline and deliver Soviet gas to western Europe. As the pipeline was called Transgas, the same name was given to the building used from 1978 as a control and dispatcher room. The architects and designers where Jiří Eisenreich, Jindřich Malátek, Václav Aulický and Ivo Loos (fountain). It was constructed in the years 1972 to 1978 on the site of apartment houses, which were previously demolished.

=== Demolition ===
In 2015, the complex was bought by Slovak developer group HB Reavis. The group decided to demolish the building and replace it with modern offices. There were attempts by different groups to release it as a cultural monument and they failed. In January 2017, art historians from Czech universities described the building as an exceptional example of brutalist architecture and requested Culture Minister Daniel Herman to prevent its demolition. They wrote, "In the context of Czech architecture of the latter half of the 20th century, it is an exceptional building that creatively follows up the period styles of Western technicism and brutalism."

In November 2017 the Czech Ministry of Culture approved the demolition so that a new office complex can be built on the site. Despite many protests and redemption effort from city of Prague, demolition of Transgas started in February 2019.

== Gallery ==
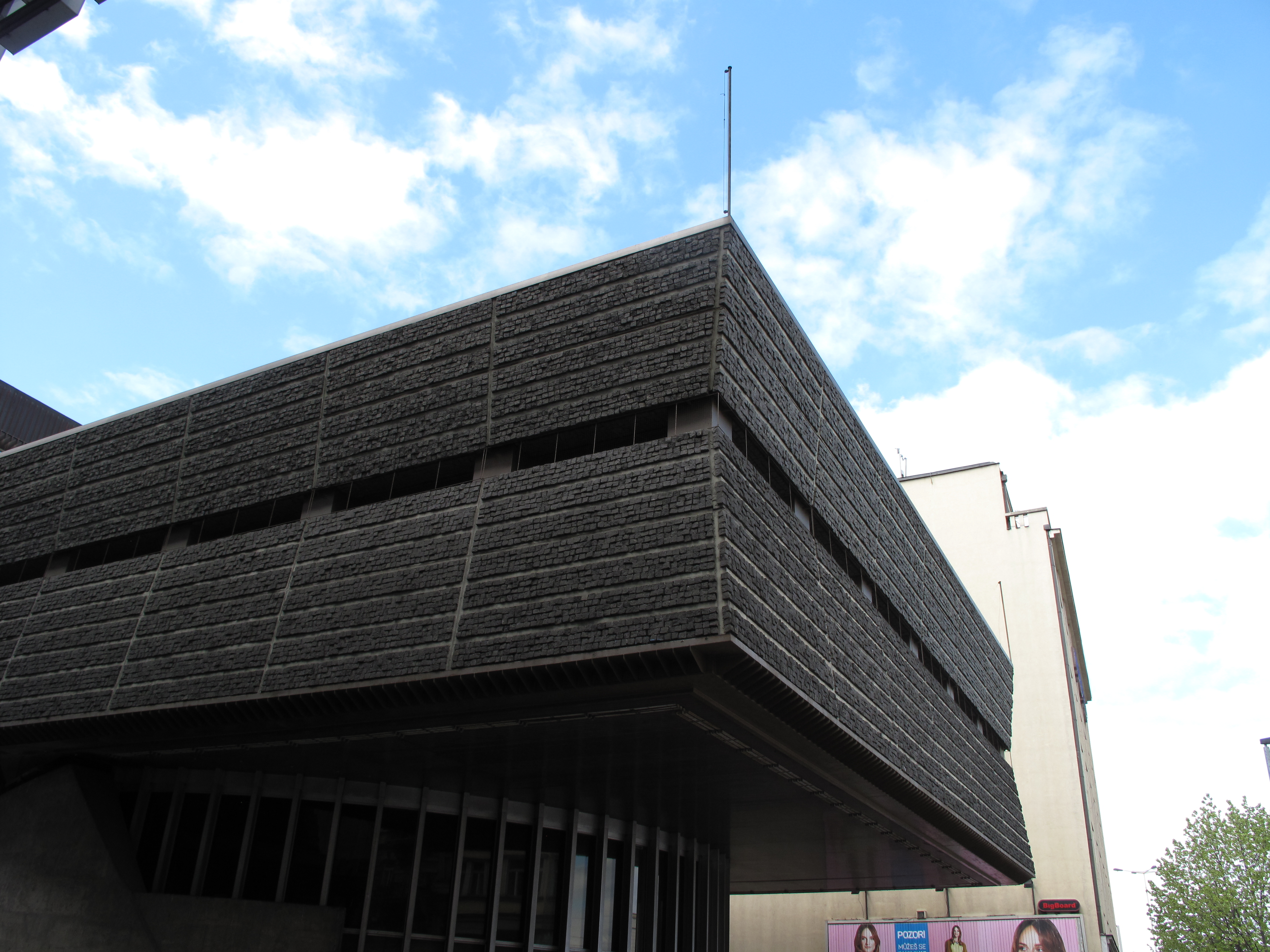
Part for a control rooms

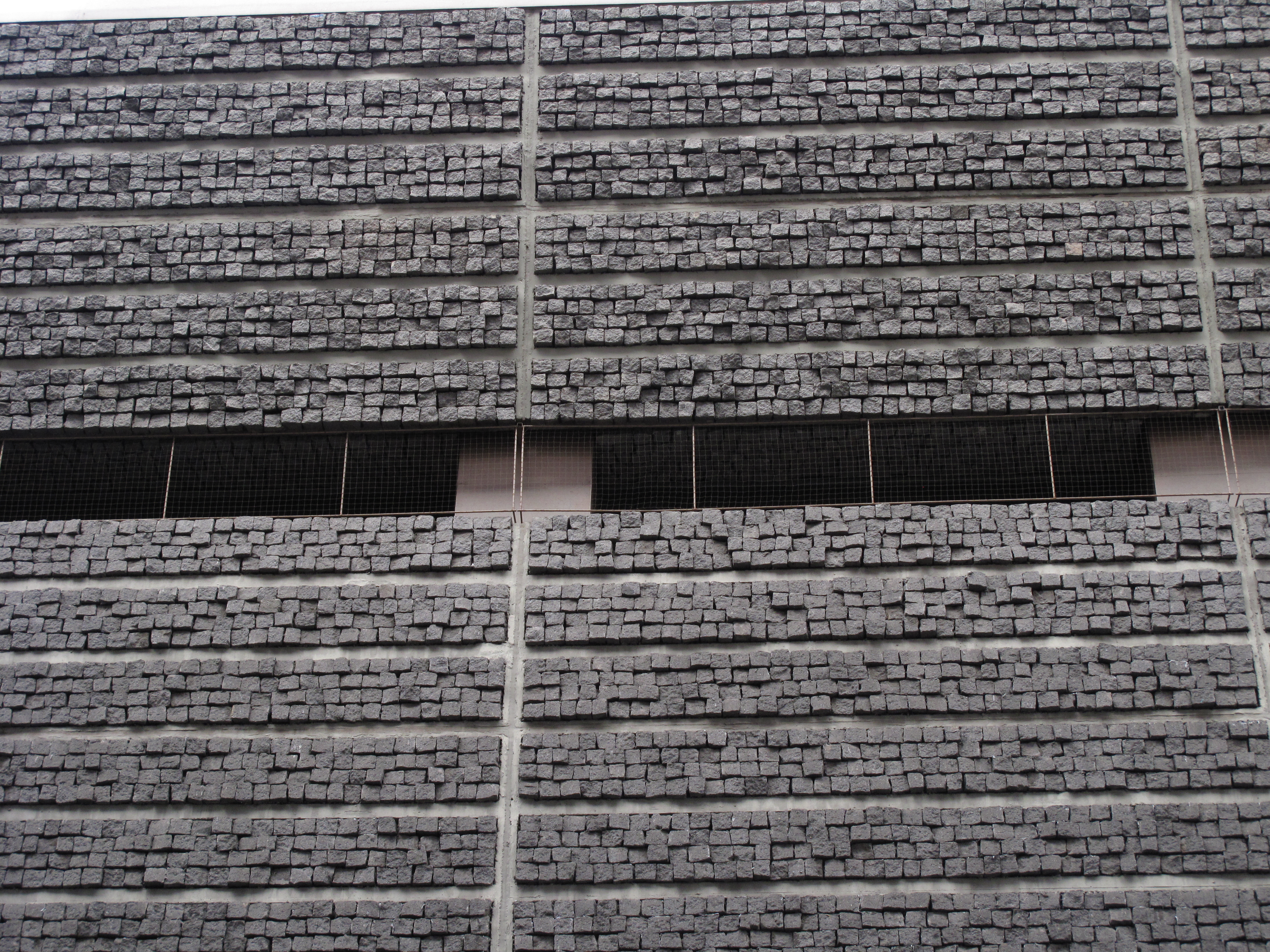
Detail of a fasade

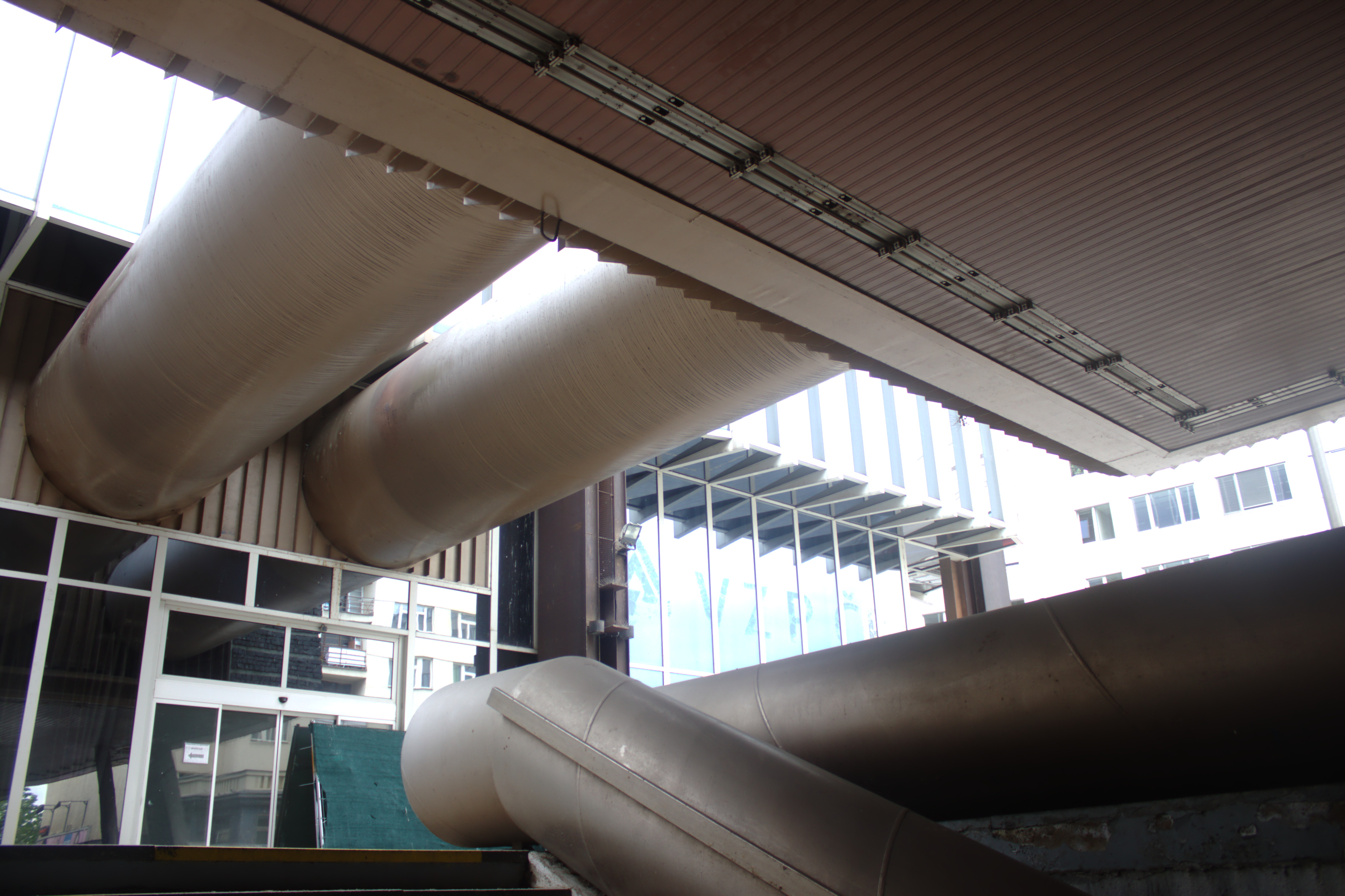
Use of pipelines

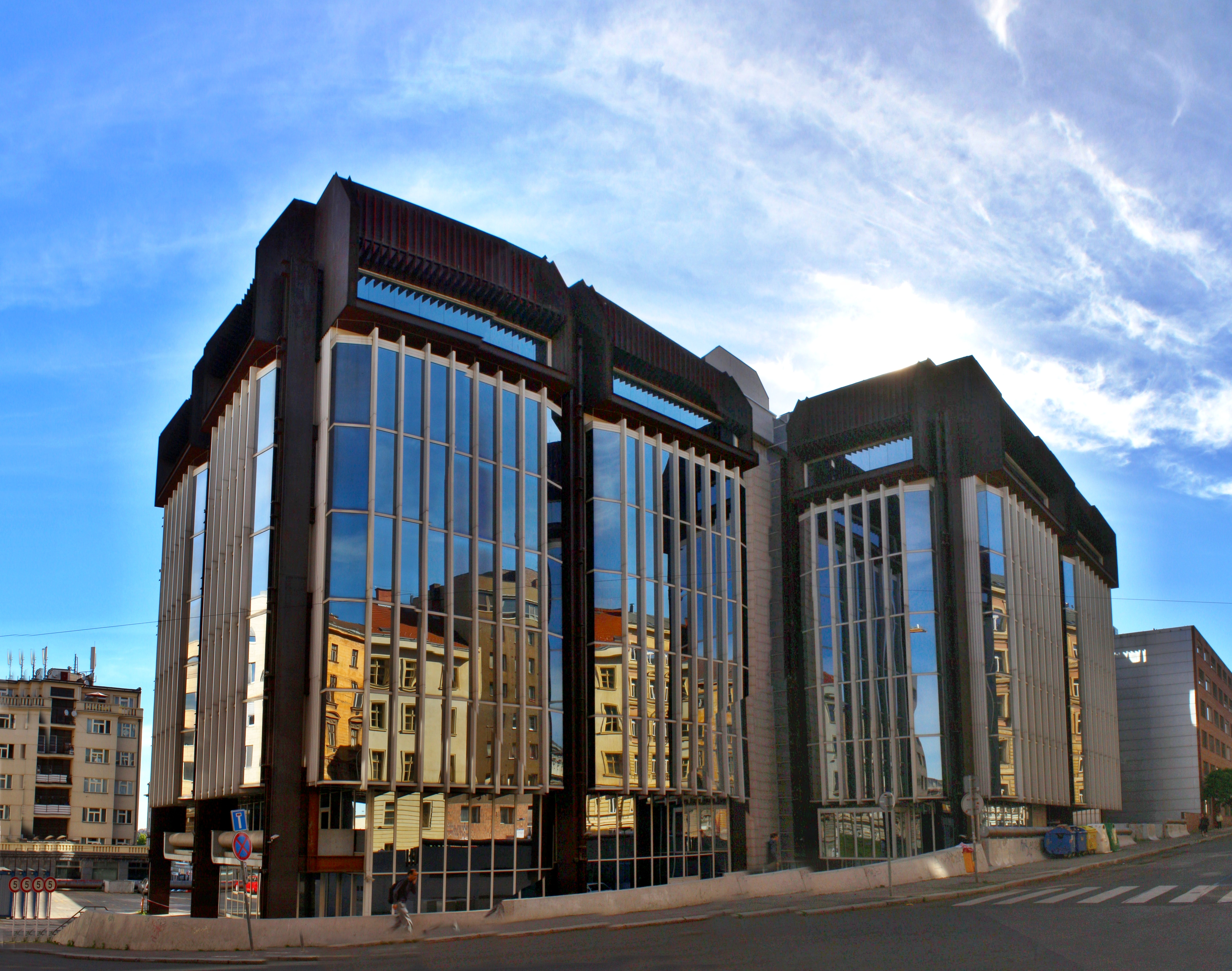
High building behind

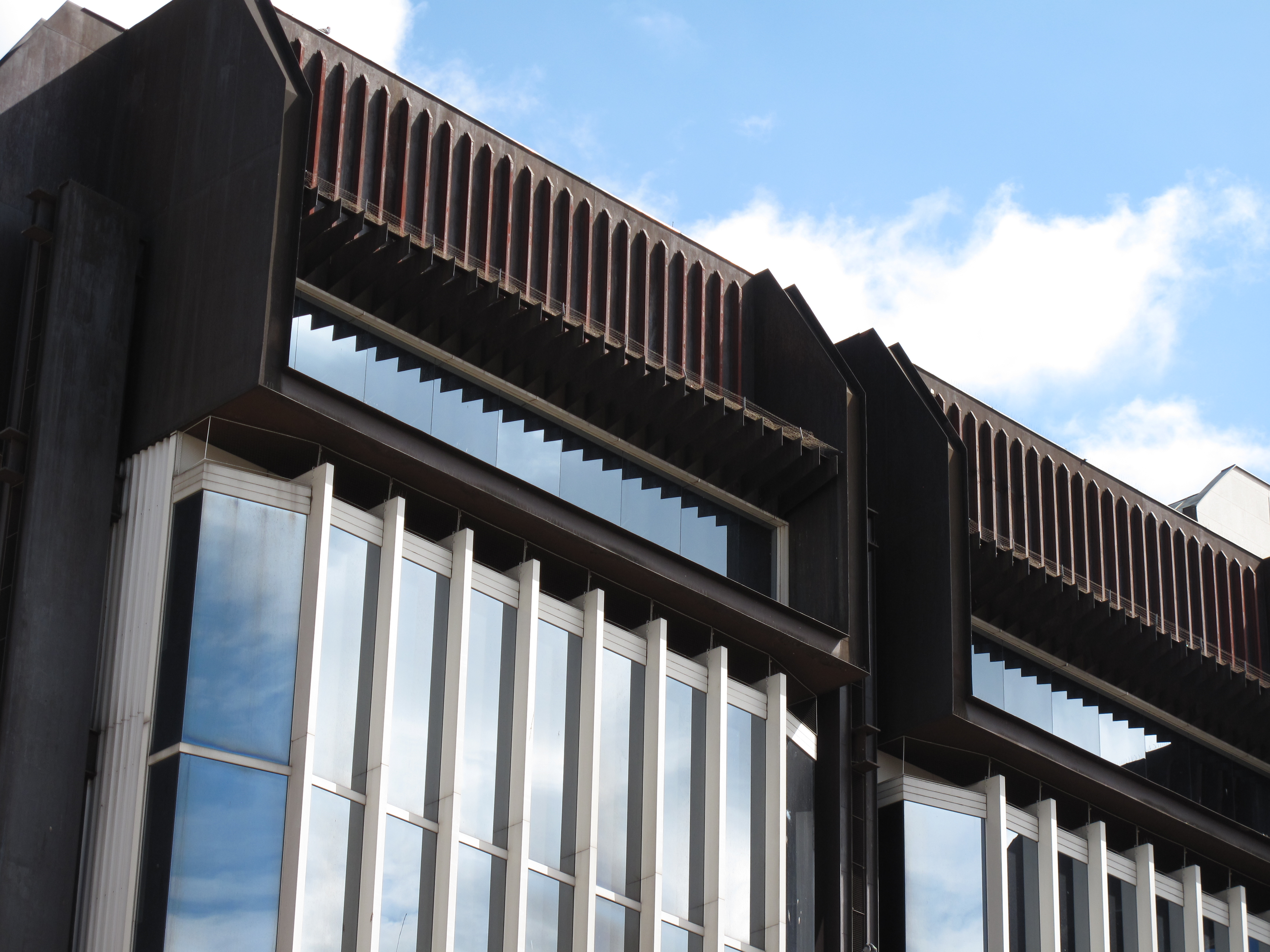
Detail

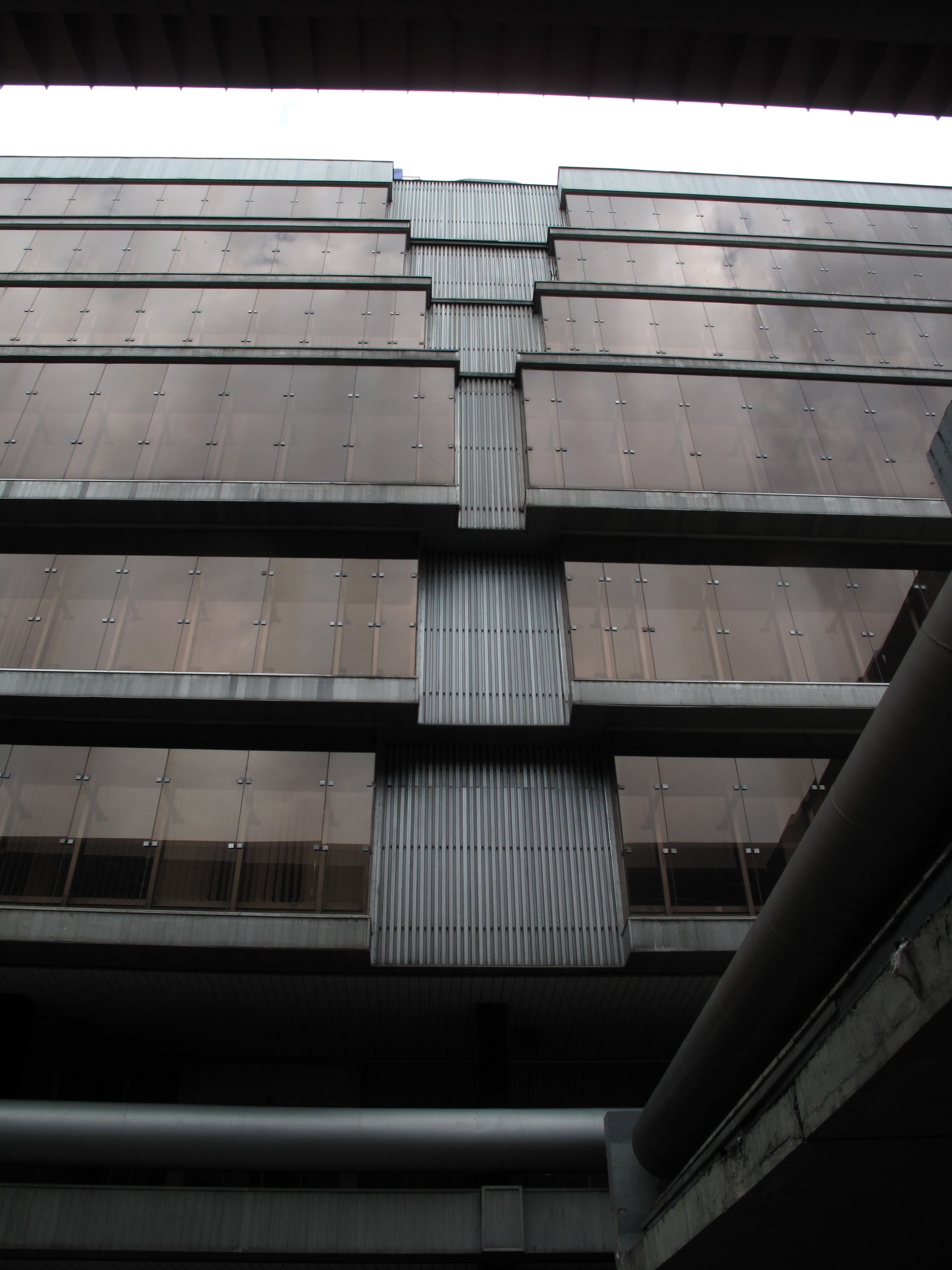
Border building

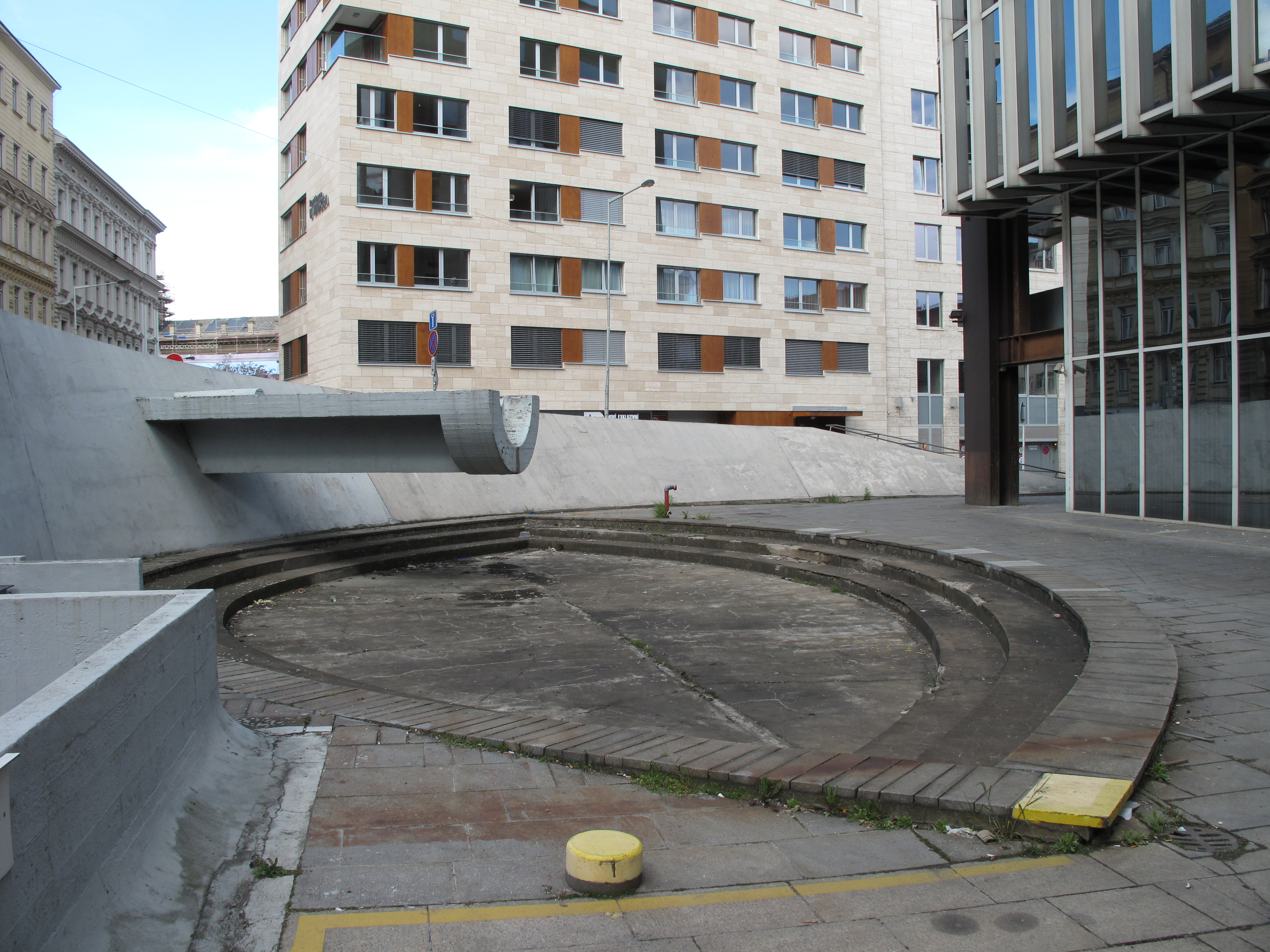
Ivo Loos's fountain
