= Čertovka =

Coordinates: 50°5′5.83″N 14°24′27.14″E

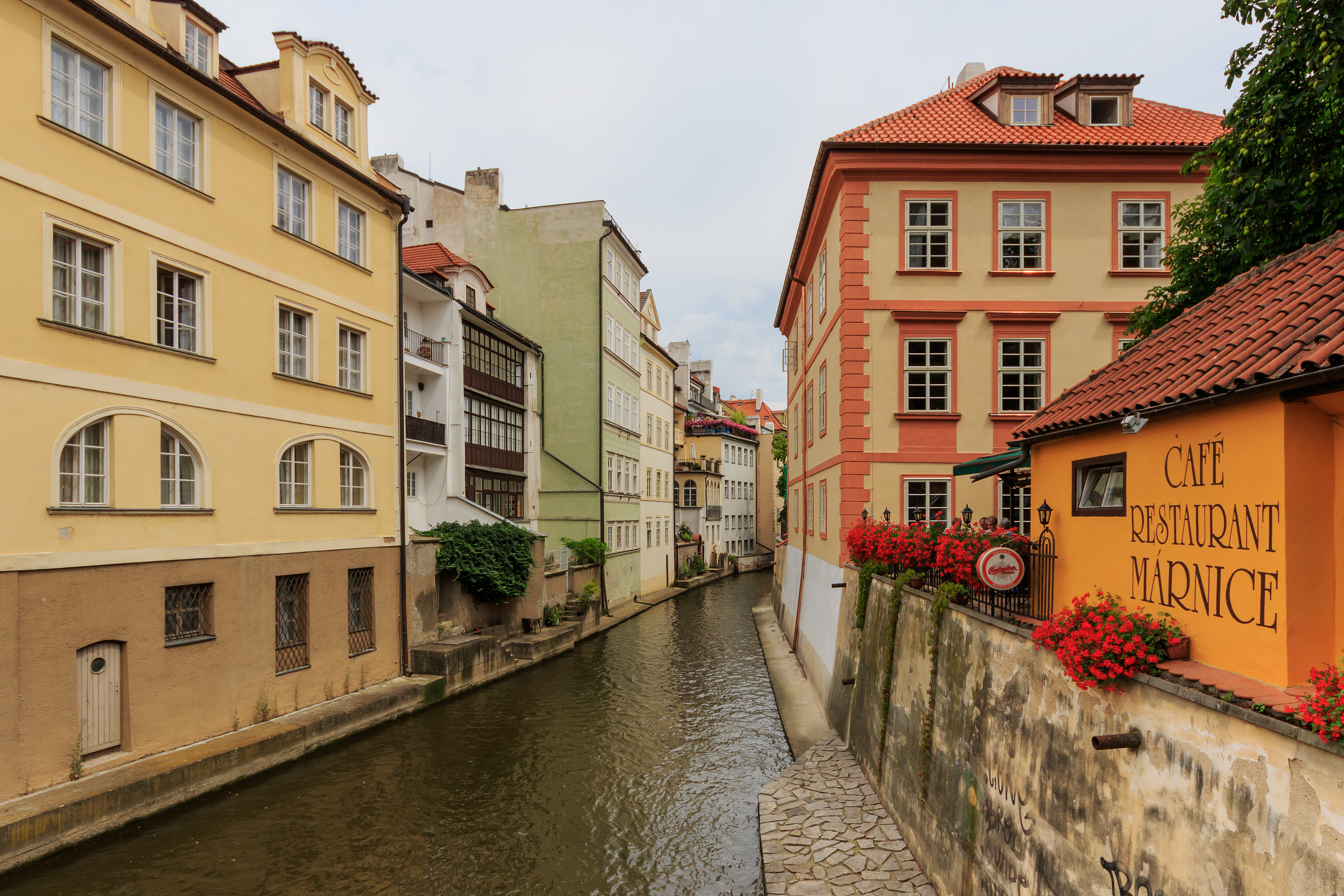
The Čertovka

The Čertovka (English: Devil's Canal), sometimes also called Little Prague Venice in English, is a canal in Prague, the Czech Republic.

The canal is situated in the Lesser Quarter (Malá Strana). The Čertovka takes its water from the Vltava and after 740 m it flows back into the same river. There are several medieval mills and many more cafes and classical buildings along its course. The canal was likely built in the 12th century by the Order of the Knights of Malta, who added a portion of land to the right and created an island called Kampa.
