= Ivan Chrenko =

Slovak businessman

- Born: 1967 or 1968 (age 57–58); Šaľa, Czechoslovakia (now Slovakia)
- Occupation: Real estate developer
- Title: Chairman and majority owner, HB Reavis

Ivan Chrenko (born 1967/68) is a Slovak billionaire businessman, the chairman and majority owner of the Slovak real estate development company HB Reavis. In March 2017, with an estimate net worth of US$1.1 billion, Chrenko became the first ever Slovak billionaire, according to Forbes. Prior to Chrenko, Andrej Babiš became the first person of Slovak origin with a net worth above $1 billion, but he later became a citizen of the Czech Republic.

Ivan Chrenko was the co-owner of HB Reavis together with Slovak multi-millionaire Viliam Pančík, and was its CEO from 1994 to October 2013.

== Life ==
Ivan Chrenko was born in 1967 in Šaľa, Czechoslovakia. He started his first business in the mid-1990s together with his partner Viliam Pančík, specializing in audio equipment and electrical engineering. They entered the company AB Reavis in 1994, one year after its foundation. AB Reavis was specialized in real estate development in Bratislava. In 2003, AB Reavis changed its name to MPT Immo. In 2004 the company transformed from limited company (s.r.o.) to public company (a.s.) and changed its name to HB REAVIS GROUP and 4 years later to HB REAVIS Slovakia.

Chrenko experienced his first major success with the development of the Aupark shopping malls in various cities in Slovakia and Czech Republic.

Chrenko lives in Bratislava, Slovakia. Chrenko does not communicate with the media, there is no published interview, and only two known photographs exist.

== See also ==
- Economy of Slovakia
