= Réva (sculpture) =

Sculpture in Prague, Czech Republic

- English: Wine
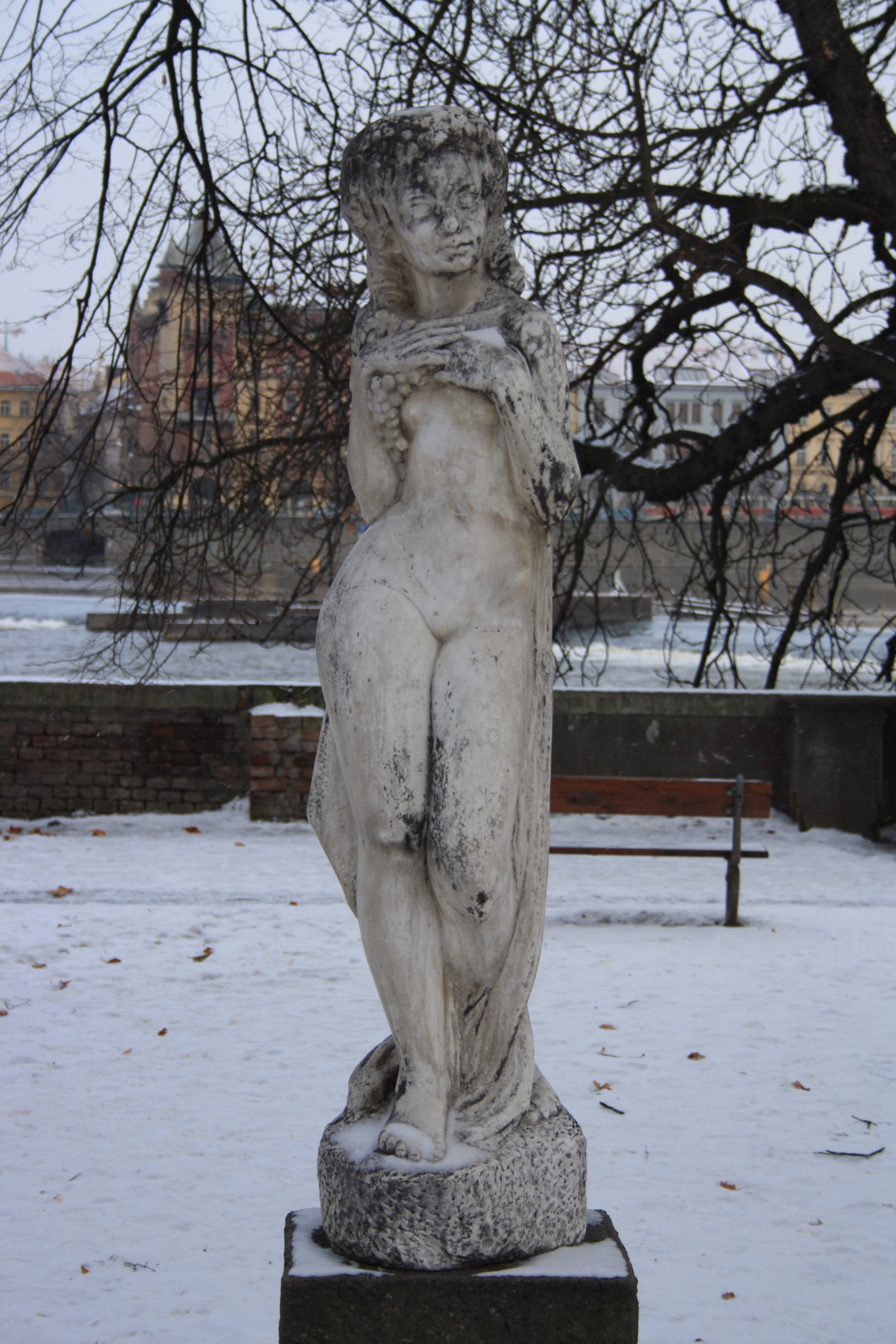
- The sculpture in 2010
- Artist: Karla Vobišová-Žáková
- Location: Prague, Czech Republic
- 50.0848908°N 14.4088447°E

Réva (English: Wine), or Dívka s hrozny (English: Girl with grapes), is an outdoor statue, installed in 1960 at Kampa Park in Prague, Czech Republic. The statue is a typical work of Karla Vobišová-Žáková, the first Czech professional female sculptor, aimed to figural and portrait sculptures. The almost life-size statue was created from Carrara marble, the piedestal from sandstone. The statue is separately registered and protected as a cultural monument since 1964. The last restoration was made in 1997.
