= Václav Aulický =

Czech architect and university professor (born 1944)

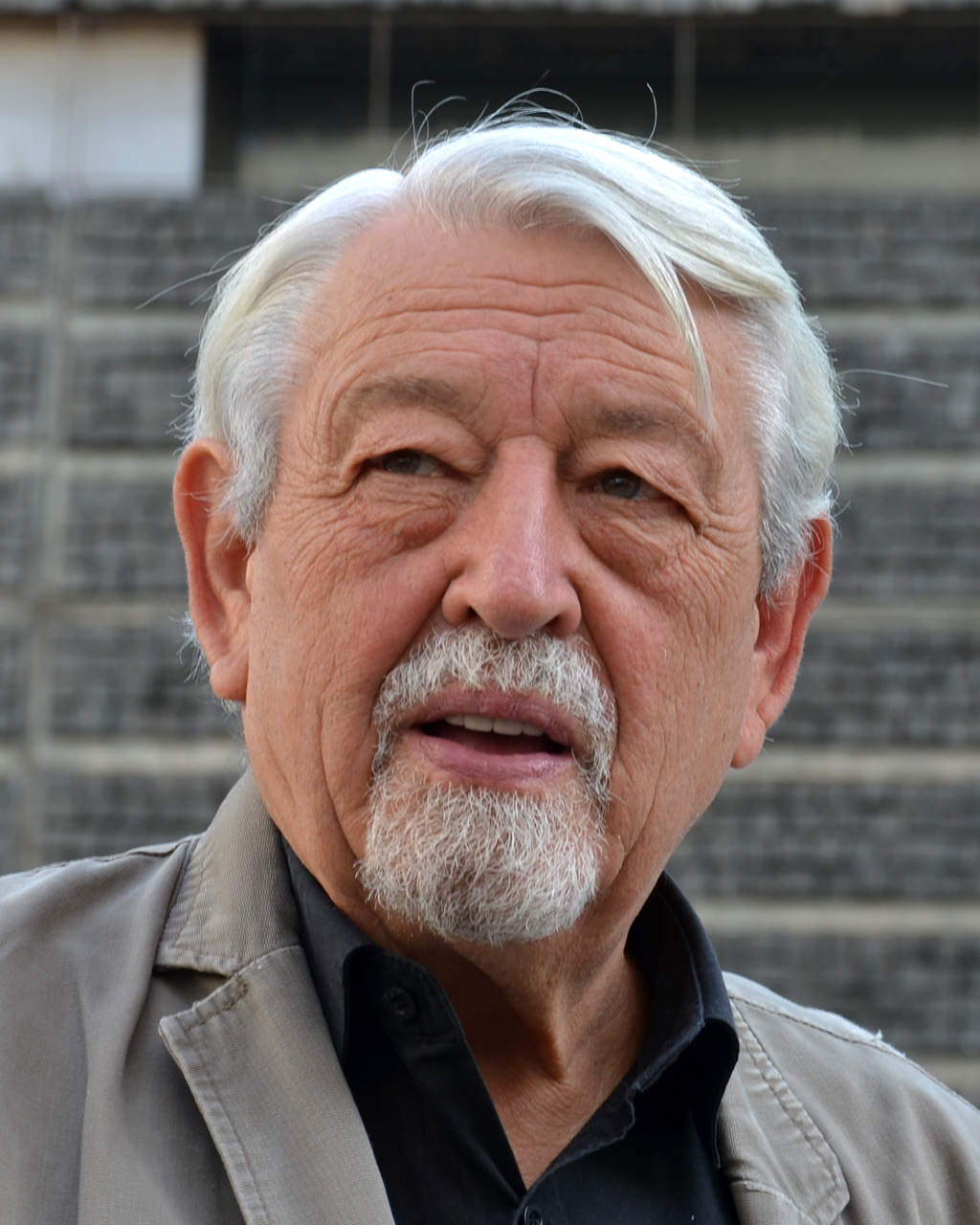
- Václav Aulický in 2018
- Born: 1 March 1944 (age 82); Prague, Czechoslovakia
- Occupations: architect, university professor
- Years active: 1967–present
- Known for: Žižkov Television Tower, Transgas

Václav Aulický (born 1 March 1944) is a Czech architect and university professor. He is a graduate of the Faculty of Civil Engineering of the Czech Technical University in Prague. His buildings have hi-tech and postmodern elements.

== Biography ==
Václav Aulický was born on 1 March 1944, in Prague. In 1967 he completed his studies in architecture at the Faculty of Civil Engineering of the Czech Technical University in Prague.

From 1967 to 1970, he worked at the Military Project Institute. Here, in Jiří Eisenreich's studio, he participated in the design of the Transgas building complex at Vinohradská 6 in Prague, which was built in 1972–1978. His task was, for example, the design of the cladding of the upper floors of high-rise buildings, where weather-resistant steel was used, produced since 1968 in Czechoslovakia under the product name ATMOFIX. During his time at the Military Project Institute, he also undertook several study trips. He was, for example, in Austria, the Scandinavian countries, and in Italy.

He has been working for Spojprojekt since 1974. Here he got to his own realizations. These were the Hošťálkovice Television Transmitter in Ostrava, the Telephone Exchange in Dejvice and the Telephone Exchange in Hradec Králové. At the end of the 1970s, he began working on the design of the Žižkov Television Tower.

He is a member of the Czech Chamber of Architects and since 1990 the Community of Architects of the Czech Republic. With his wife, architect Zdenka Aulická, he has two daughters and six grandchildren. He runs a studio at Spojprojekt, dealing mainly with telecommunications buildings and transmitters.

Since 2005 he has also been working at the Faculty of Architecture of the Czech Technical University as the head of the studio. He later habilitated there as an associate professor.

== Realization ==
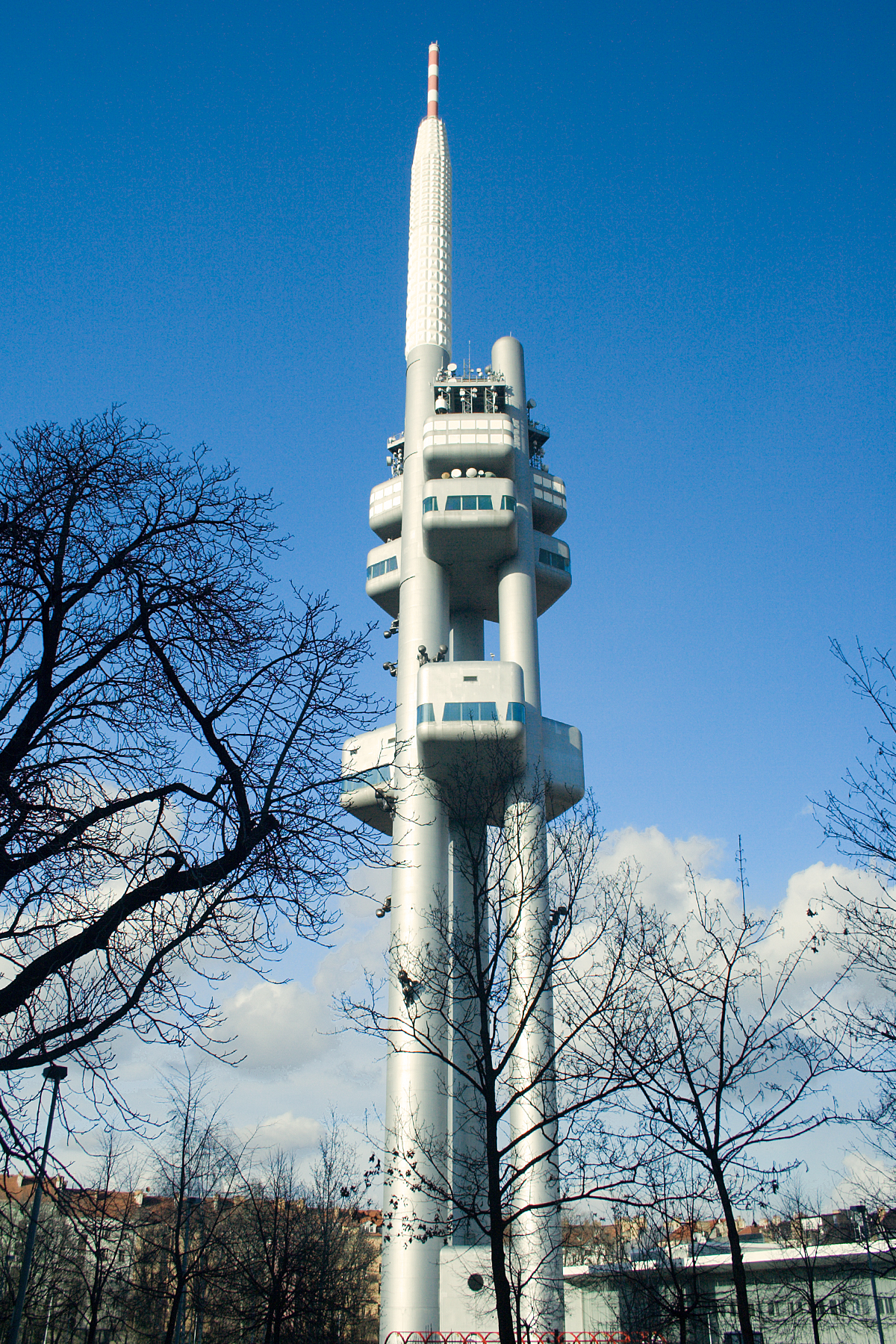
Žižkov Television Tower

Václav Aulický has a number of realizations to his credit. First he designed telecommunication objects, later also other buildings:

- Transgas, Prague, Vinohrady (1978);
- Automatic Telephone Exchange, Prague-Dejvice (1978)
- Hošťálkovice Television Transmitter, Ostrava (1980)
- Transit Telephone Exchange, Hradec Králové (1982) with Jindřich Malátek
- Žižkov Television Tower, Prague (1992)
- Czech Television operating buildings, Prague-Kavčí hory (1995)
- Česká pojišťovna's administrative buildings in Prague-Pankrác (1997)
- Zirkon Administrative Center, Prague (1997)
- Rubín Building, Prague, Karlín (2001)
- Polygon House, Prague, Pankrác (2004)
- Anděl Media Center, Smíchov, Prague (2004)
- Diamond Point, Prague-Karlín (2005)
- City Point, Prague-Pankrác (2005)
- City Tower, Prague-Pankrác (2008) with Richard Meier and Aleš Papp
- Trimaran, Prague-Pankrác (2018) together with Ernsten Hoffmann, Martin Tröthan
- City Element, Prague-Pankrác (2019) in collaboration with Martin Tröthan and Jindřich Sová

== Gallery ==
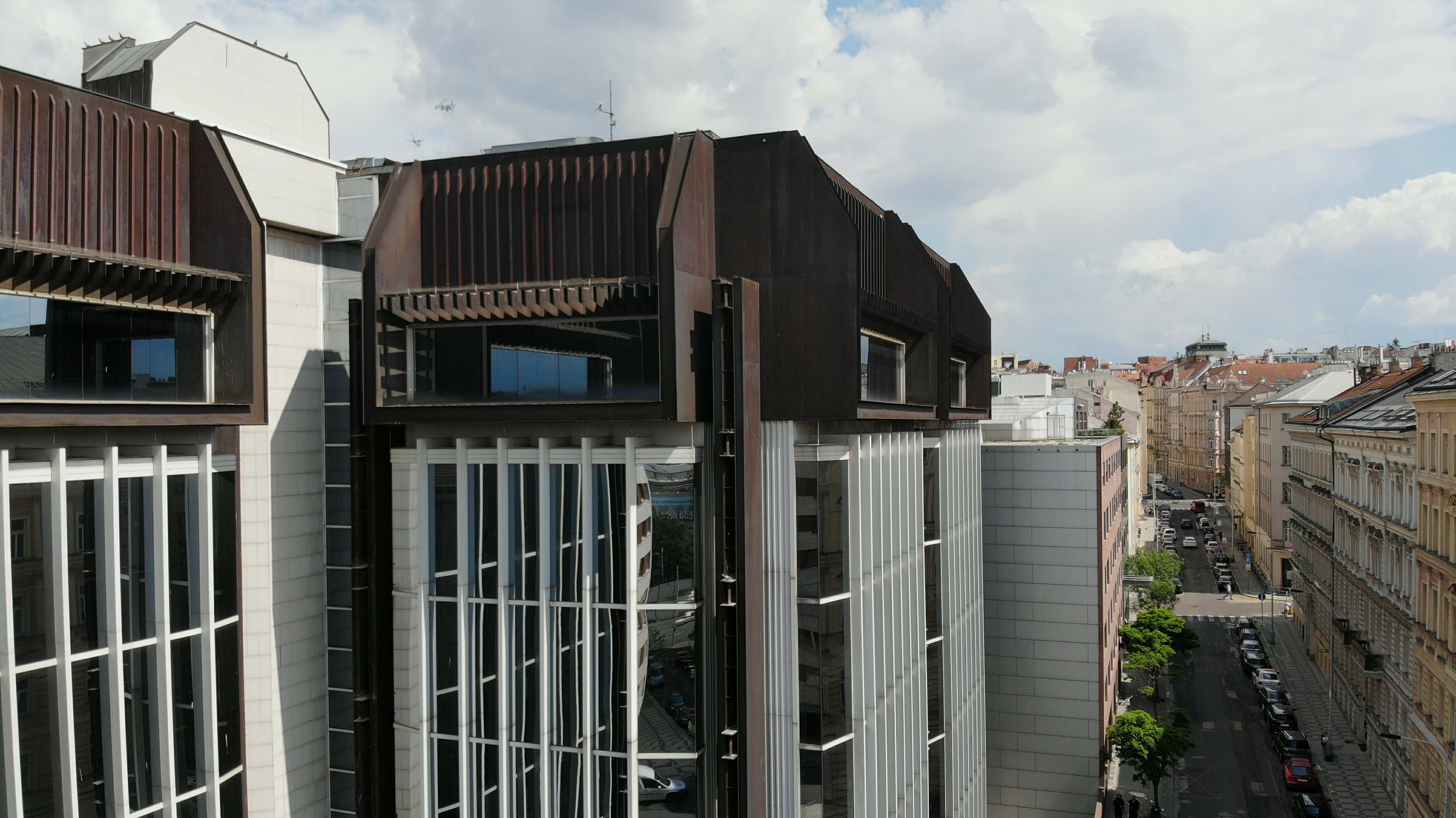
Top parts of high-rise buildings of Transgas

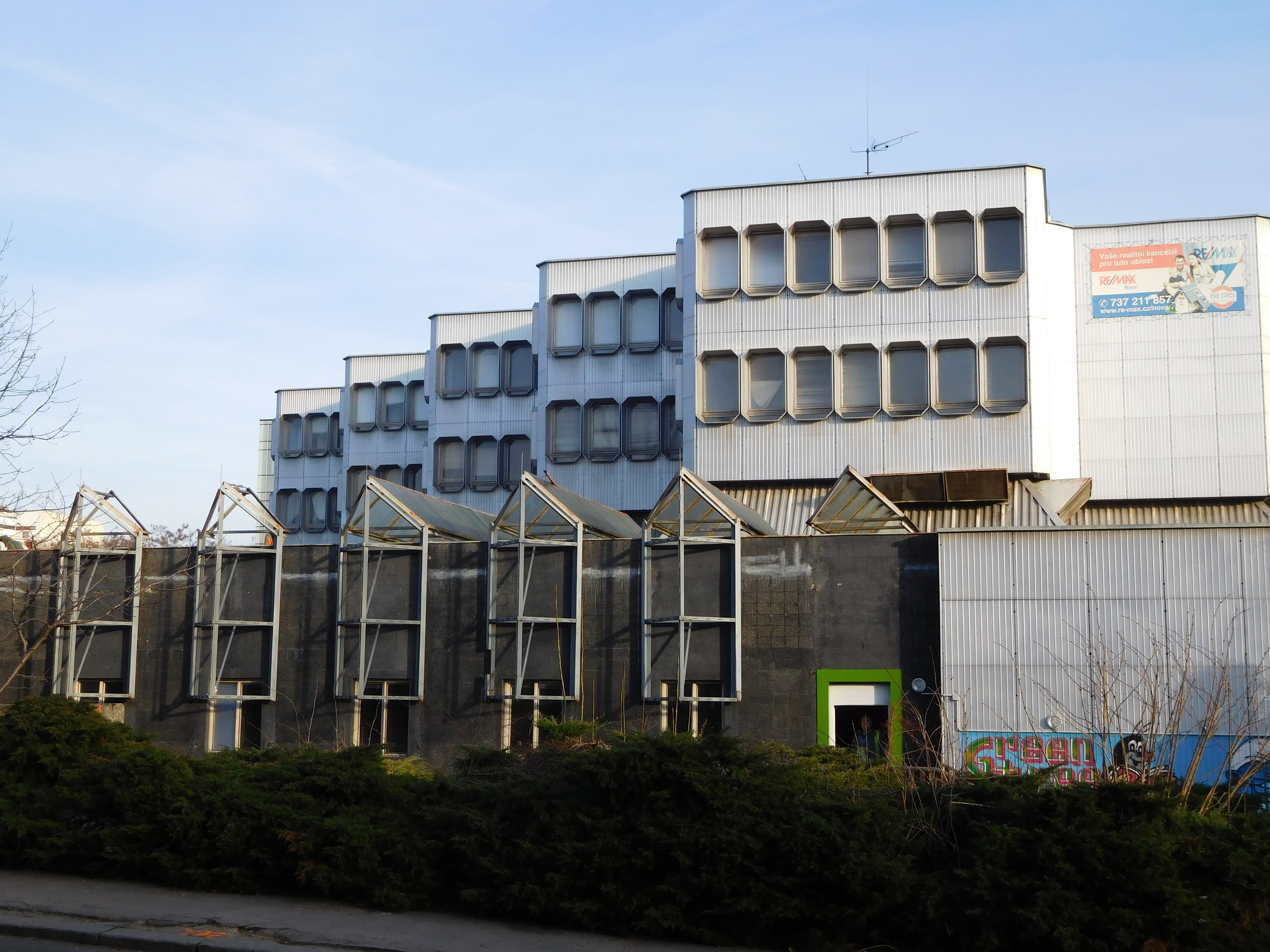
Automatic Telephone Exchange in Prague-Dejvice

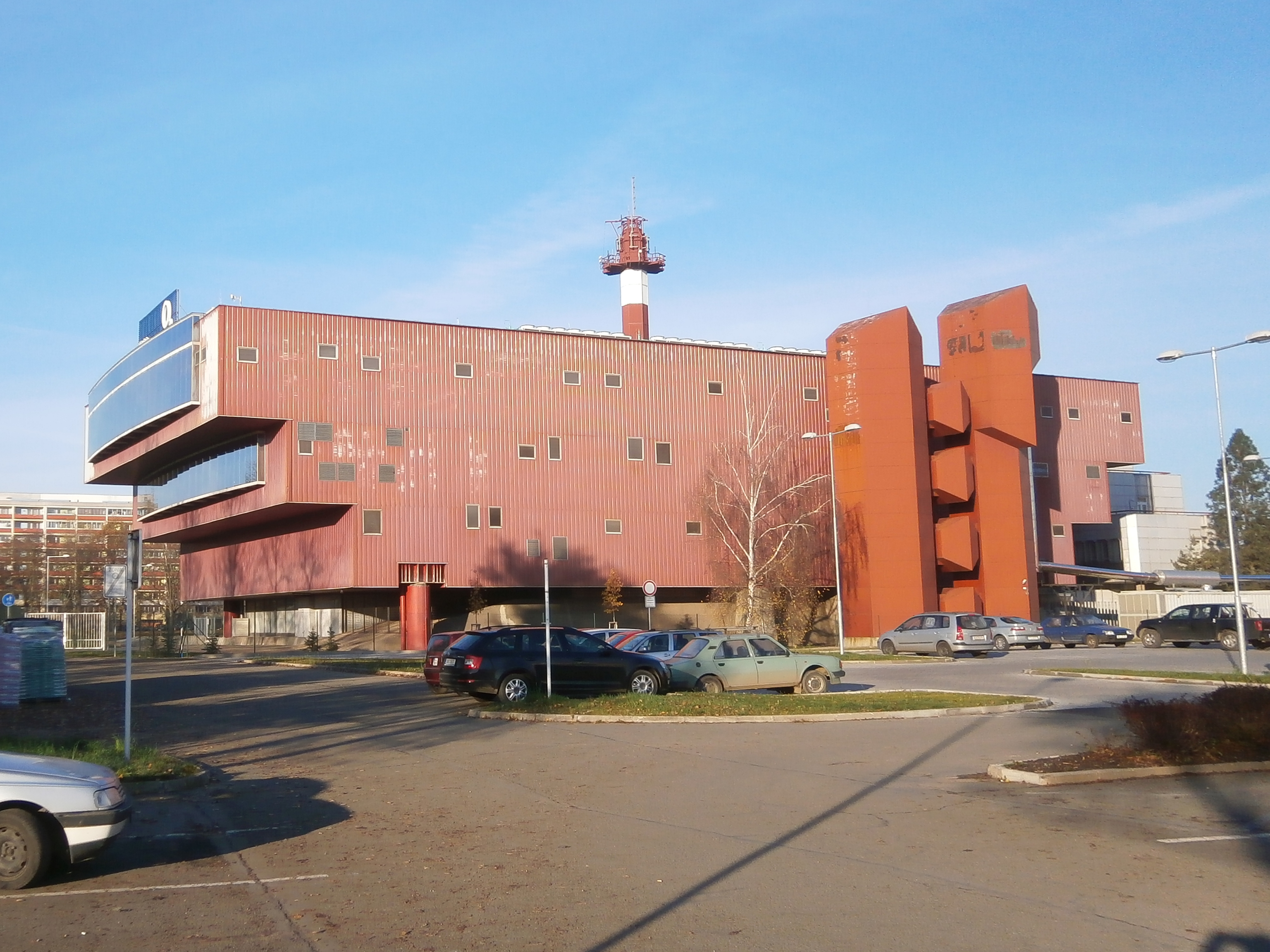
Transit Telephone Exchange in Hradec Králové

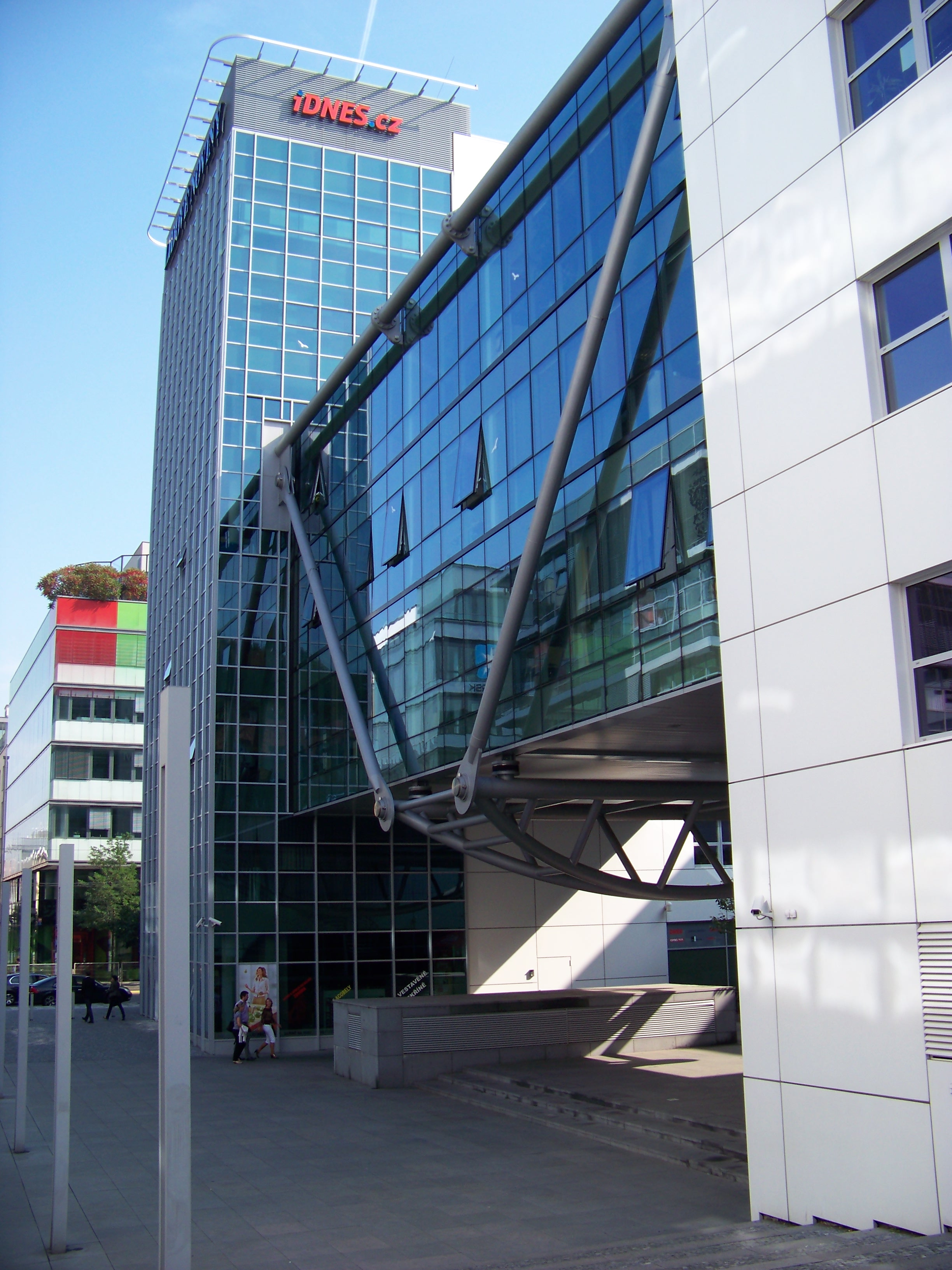
Anděl Media Centre

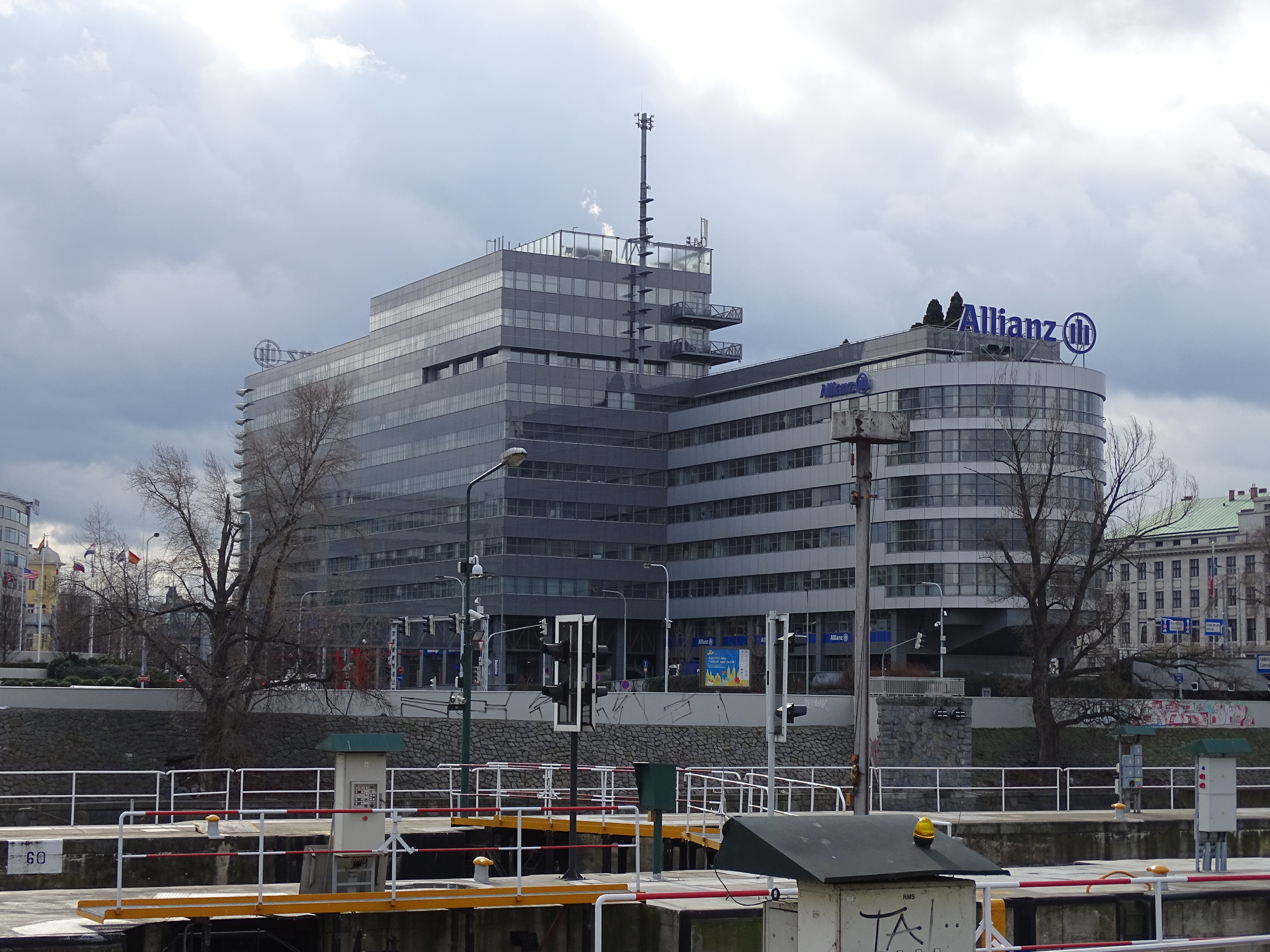
Diamond Point

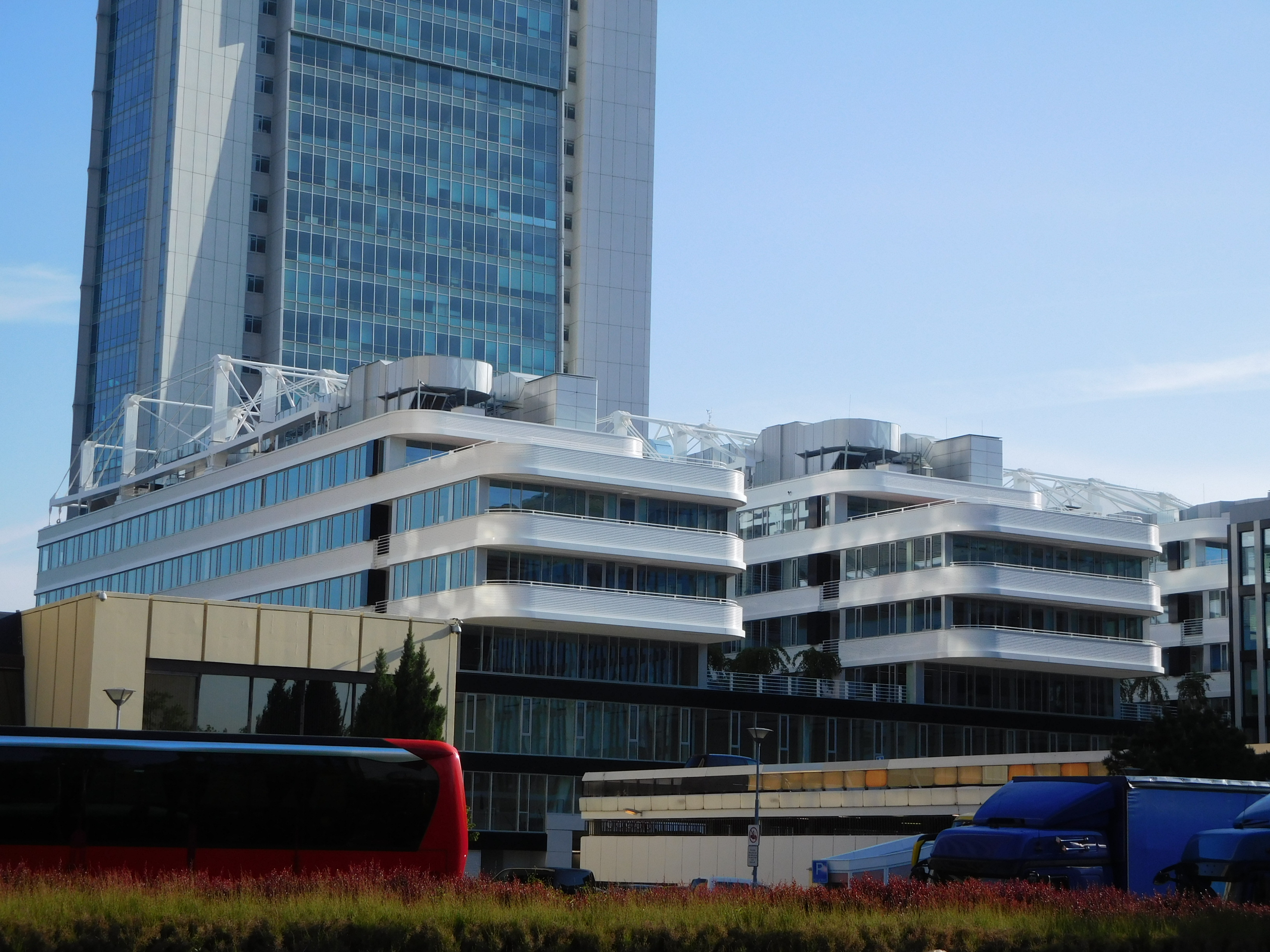
Trimaran

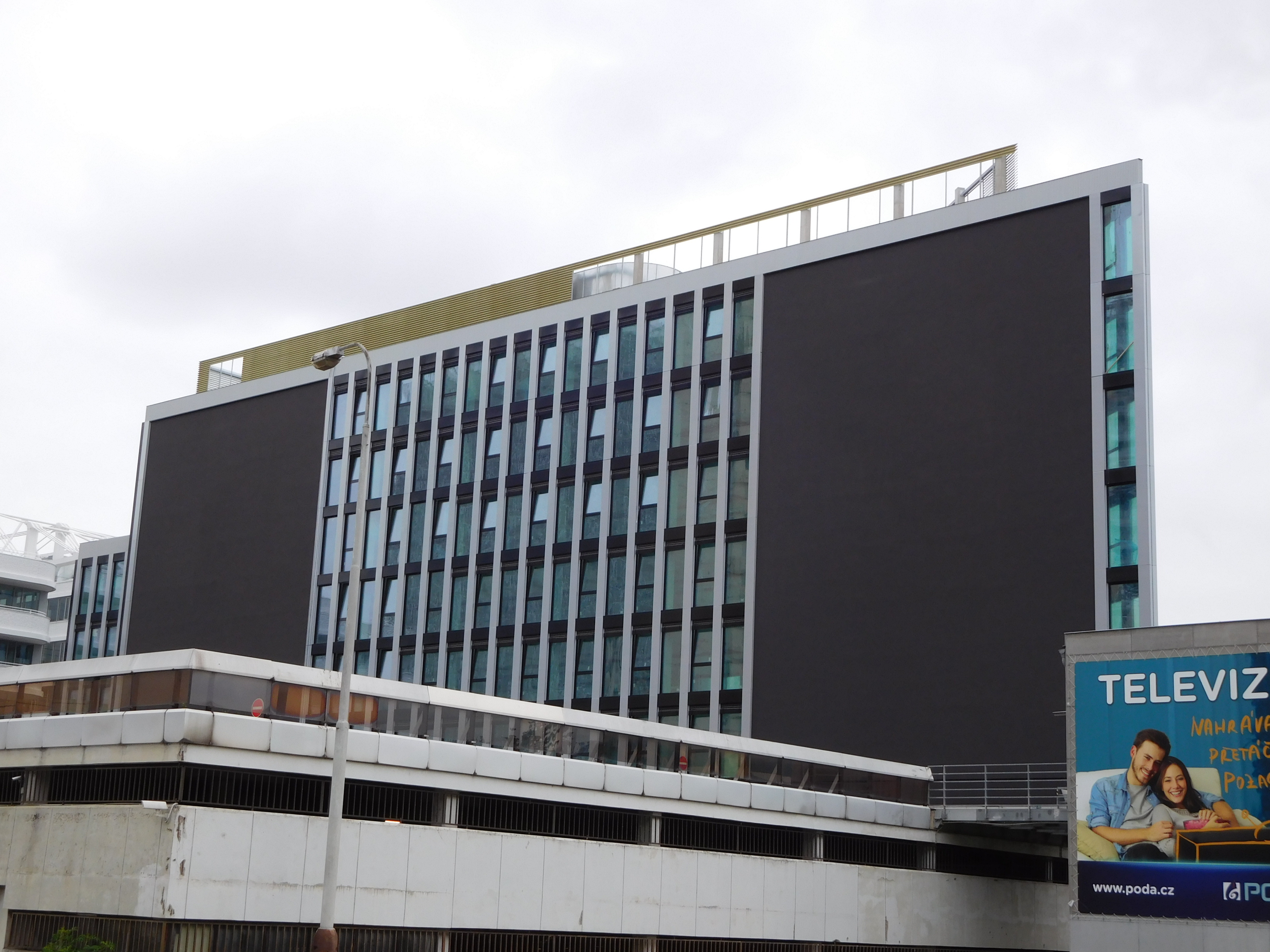
City Element
