= Kampa Park =

Park in Prague, Czech Republic

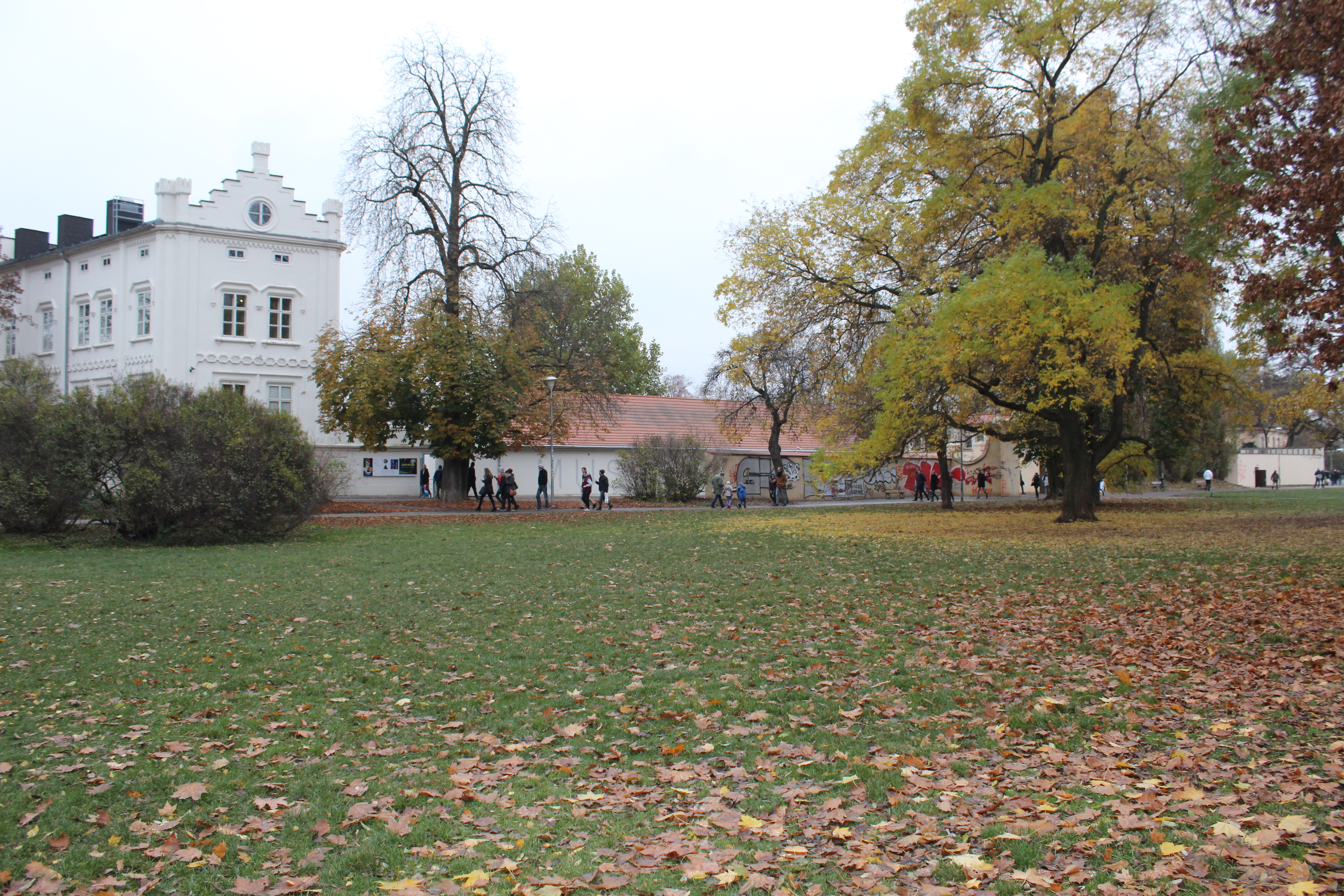
- Interactive map of Kampa Park
- Location: Vltava, Prague, Czech Republic
- Coordinates: 50°5′6″N 14°24′29.16″E

Kampa Park, or Park Kampa, is a park on Kampa Island, in the Vltava, in Prague, Czech Republic.

== See also ==
- Réva (sculpture)
