= Kampa Island =

Island on Vltava river, Prague, Czech Republic

Kampa
Native name: Kampa
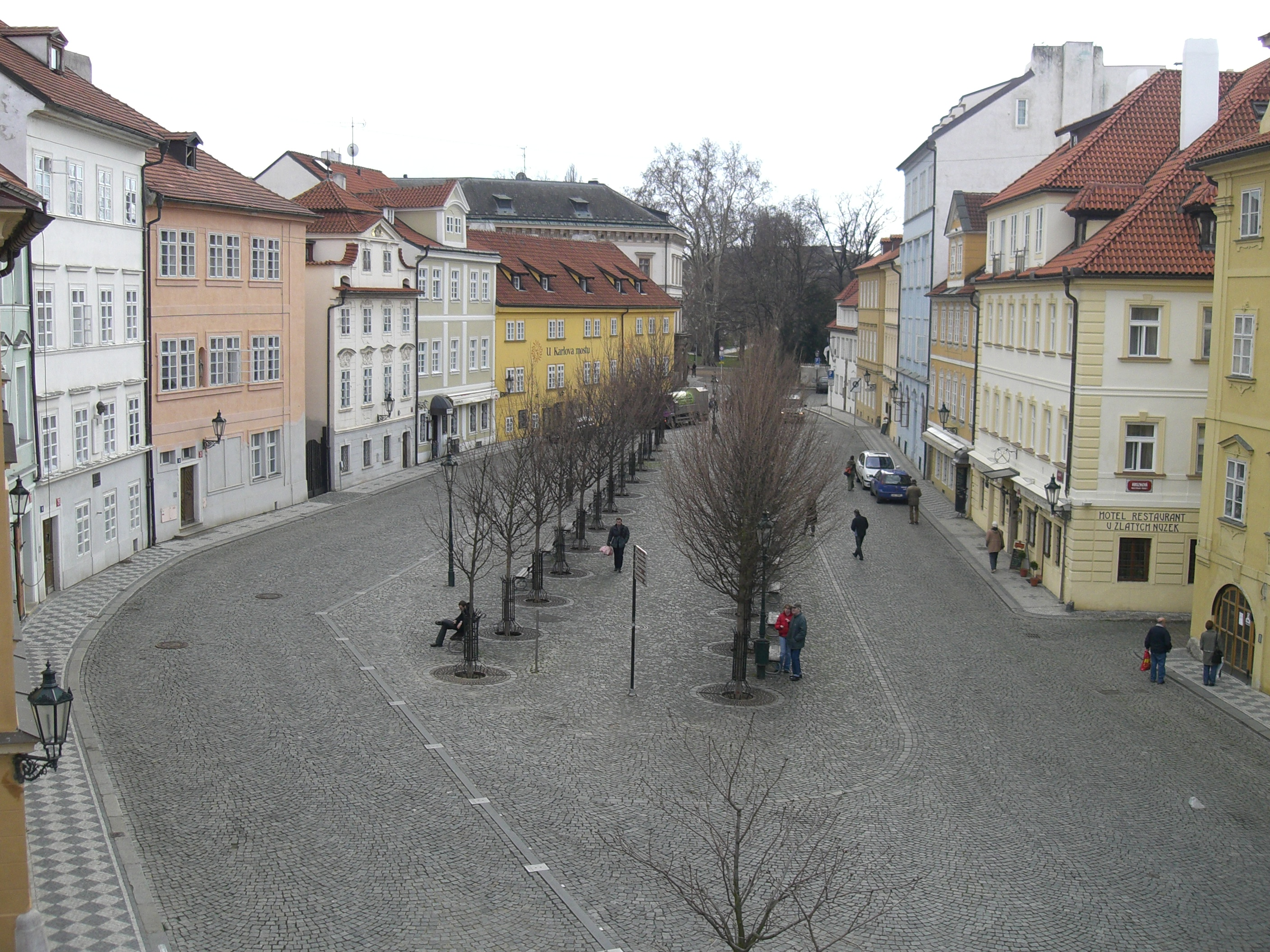
- Kampa from the Charles Bridge
- Interactive map of Kampa

Geography
- Location: Vltava
- Coordinates: 50°05′6″N 14°24′30″E

Administration
- Czech Republic

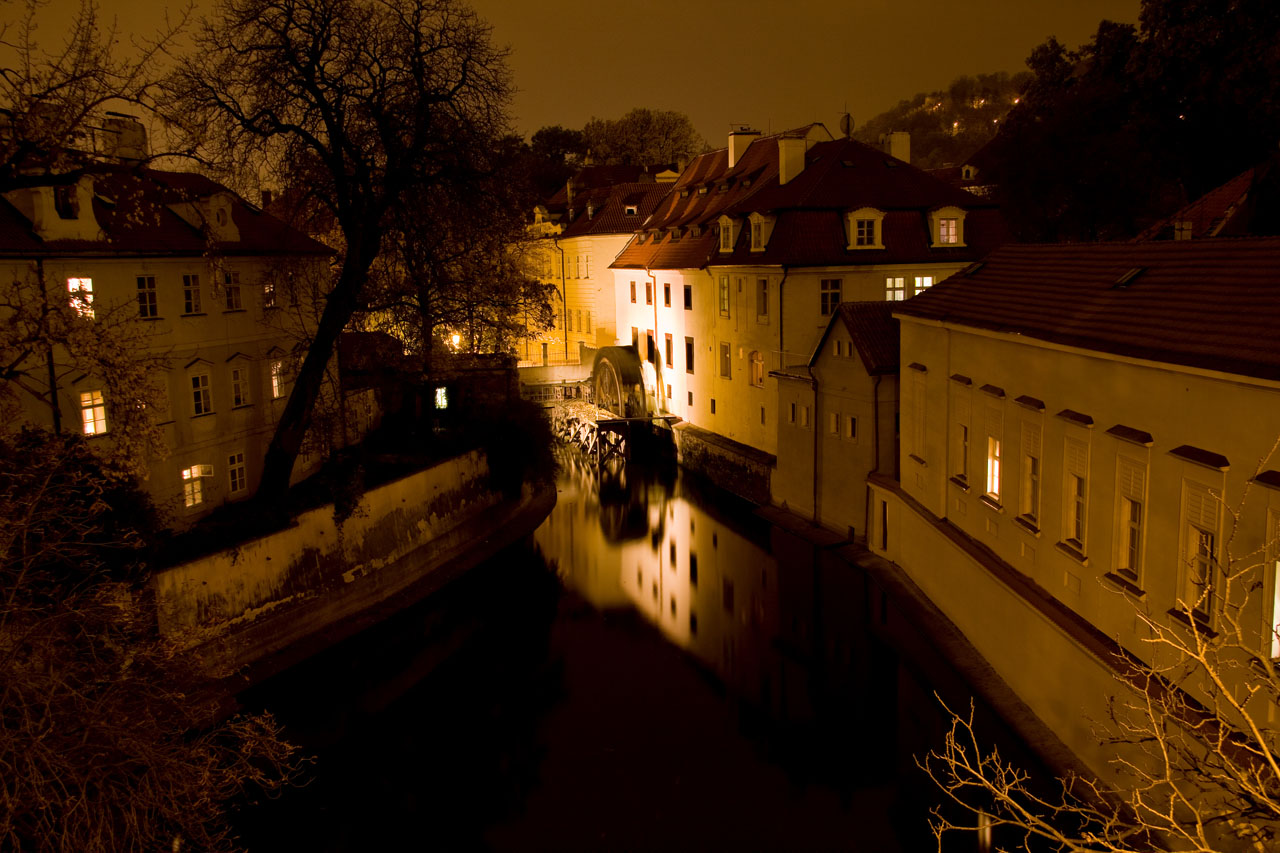
Čertovka at night. Kampa Island is on the left.

Kampa (also Na Kampě) is an island in the Vltava river in central Prague on the side of Malá Strana. Charles Bridge crosses its northern tip and is connected to the island by the street ulice Na Kampě. It is separated from Malá Strana by a narrow artificial channel to the west called the Devil's Stream (Čertovka), a waterway dug to power water mills (no longer existent). It is supposedly named after a sharp-tongued woman who lived in a local home called the Seven Devils.

The area was named in the 17th century as the campus ("field") by Spanish soldiers who tented here during the Battle of White Mountain.

== Museum Kampa ==
Kampa is home to Museum Kampa, a modern art gallery showing central European (and in particular Czech) work. The pieces are from the private collection of Meda Mládek, wife of Jan V. Mládek. The museum, which opened in 2003, is housed in Sova's Mills on the eastern bank of the island. Magdalena Jetelova's huge chair sculpture, situated outside the museum above the river, is a prominent landmark visible from across the Vltava.

== In popular culture ==
Several scenes from the opening sequence of the 1996 Mission Impossible movie were filmed on Kampa Island.
