= Hostivít =

Mythical Bohemian prince

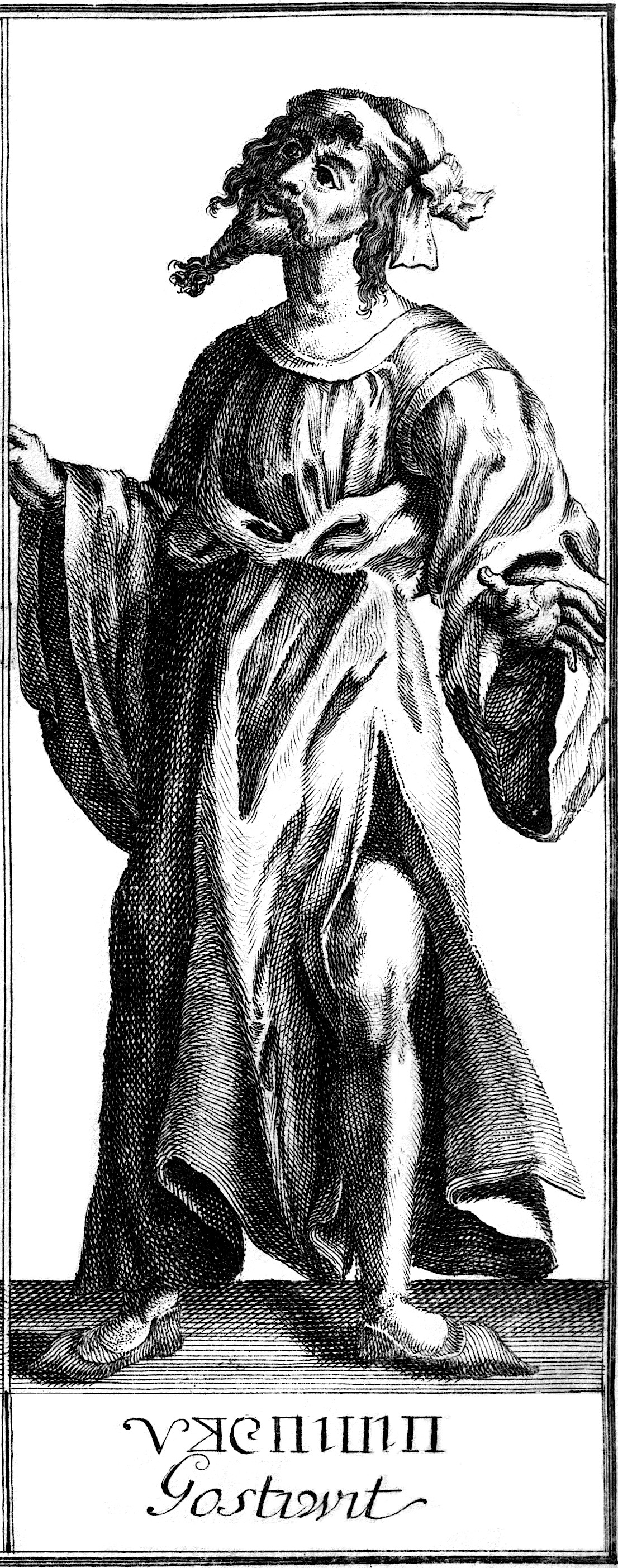

Hostivít was the last of the seven Bohemian mythical princes between the (also mythical) founder of the Přemyslid dynasty, Přemysl the Ploughman and the first historical prince Bořivoj. The names of the princes were first recorded in Chronica Boemorum written by Cosmas of Prague in the 12th century and then transmitted into historical books of the 19th century including František Palacký's The History of the Czech Nation in Bohemia and Moravia. According to tradition, he was the father of the non-legendary prince Bořivoj. Some historians suppose that when St. Ludmila was born, Hostivít (or Svatopluk I of Moravia) and Ludmila's father, Slavibor, contracted that Ludmilla would marry Bořivoj (which could refer to the wedding procession of an unknown bride mentioned in Annales Fuldenses for 871. According to the Chronicle of Dalimil, Hostivít had a brother called Děpolt who inherited the land of Kouřim.

One theory about the number of the princes is propped on the frescoes on the walls of the Rotunda in Znojmo, Moravia but Anežka Merhautová claimed that the frescoes depict all the members of the Přemyslid dynasty including the Moravian junior princes.

== Origin of the name ==
Hostivít's name is thought to be derived from the old Slavonic words hosti meaning 'guests' and vítat meaning 'to welcome'. Záviš Kalandra thought the names of the seven princes were cryptical names of ancient Slavonic days of the week – Hostivít being the seventh, i.e. Saturday, when the guests are welcome.

Another theory suggests the names of the Přemysl ancestors arose from a mistaken interpretation by Cosmas. According to postulation by Vladimír Karbusický, Cosmas likely contrived them when trying to read a lost Latin transcription of an old-Slavonic message. When the ancestral names are combined and reassessed, they can roughly cohere an assumed text:

"Krok‘ kazi tetha lubossa premisl nezamisl mna ta voj‘n ni zla kr‘z mis neklan gosti vit..."

In modern English, this may translate to:

"Halt your steps, Tetha, and rather think, I do not intend war or evil upon you, we do not bow to the cross, we welcome guests..."

The alleged message is speculated to be from the Czech princes to the Franks, perhaps in relation to the Battle of Zásek c. 849 described in the Annales Fuldenses.

== Seven mythical princes after Přemysl ==
Mythical Princes of Bohemia
Nezamysl
Mnata
Vojen
Vnislav
Křesomysl
Neklan
Hostivít

== See also ==
- List of rulers of Bohemia
