= Duke Krok =

Figure in Czech legend

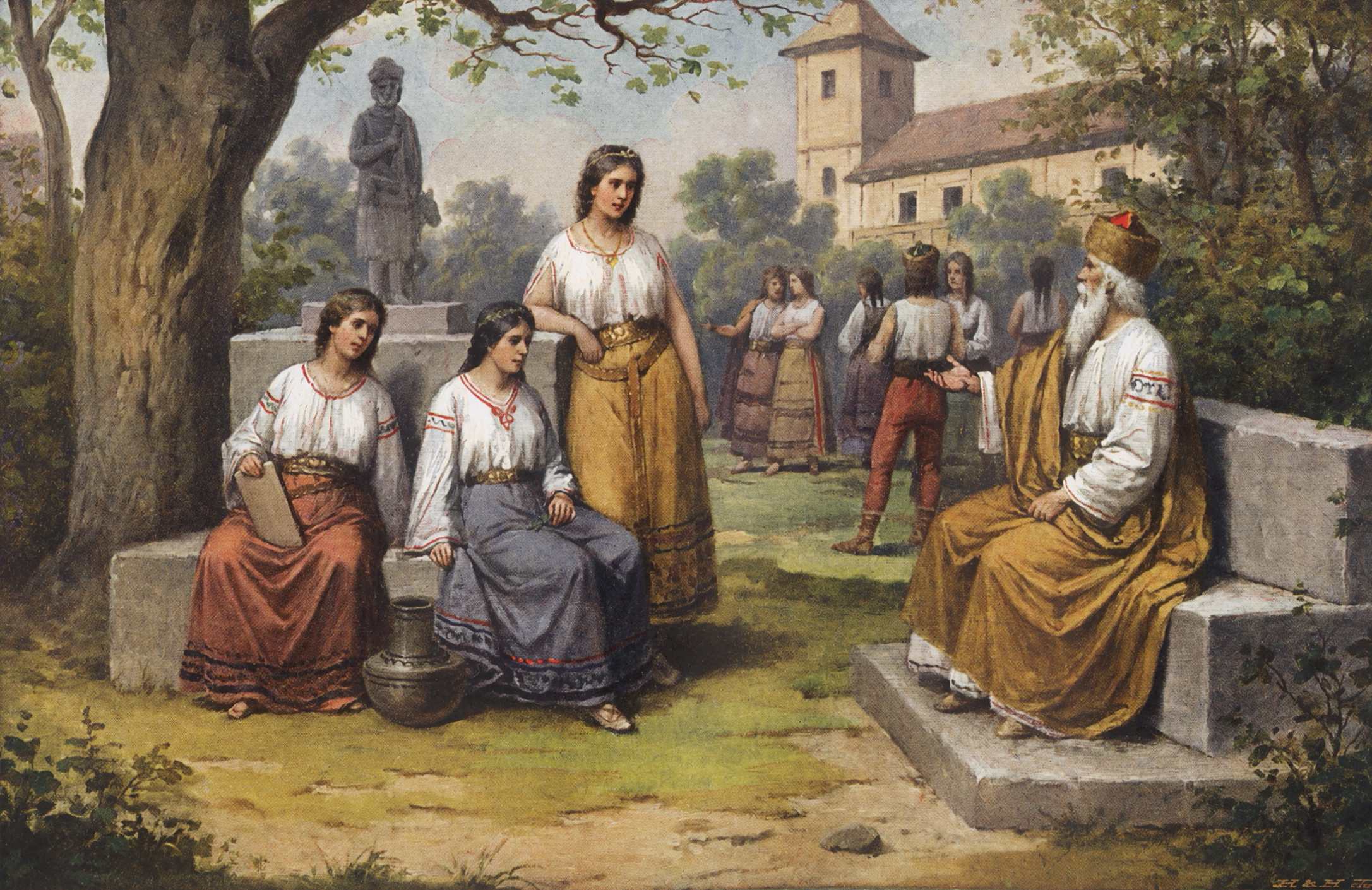
Josef Mathauser – Duke Krok with his Daughters: Libuše, Kazi, and Teta.

Duke Krok is a legendary figure in Czech history, being the first judge, or duke, of the Czech people. He was also the father of Princess Libuše and her sisters Kazi and Teta.

== The Cosmas Chronicle ==
Perhaps the earliest mention of the Duke (as "Crocco") is in the Chronica Boëmorum, which was originally written in Latin. Cosmas describes the manner of the first inhabitants of Bohemia, who at first lived very simply and did not know alcohol, marriages, private property or weapons. After a time, however, they fell into injustice and envy. And, according to Cosmas, the people had "neither the judge nor the prince". So, Krok rose amongst the people; he was described by Cosmas as "a man known for his age, absolutely perfect, rich and worldly in his judgements, and sophisticated. This wonderful man had no male heirs, but rather three daughters, whom nature had granted the treasures of wisdom".

However, this is the last Cosmas says of Krok, except to describe his daughters and their own exploits. Later chroniclers would expand upon this, for example, Václav Hájek of Libočany, who writes about the death of Forefather Čech. He writes that when Čech died he tried to pass the leading of the Czech people to his brother Lech, who refused, and recommended Krok in his place. He also wrote that Krok transferred his seat to Vyšehrad in 683.

== History ==
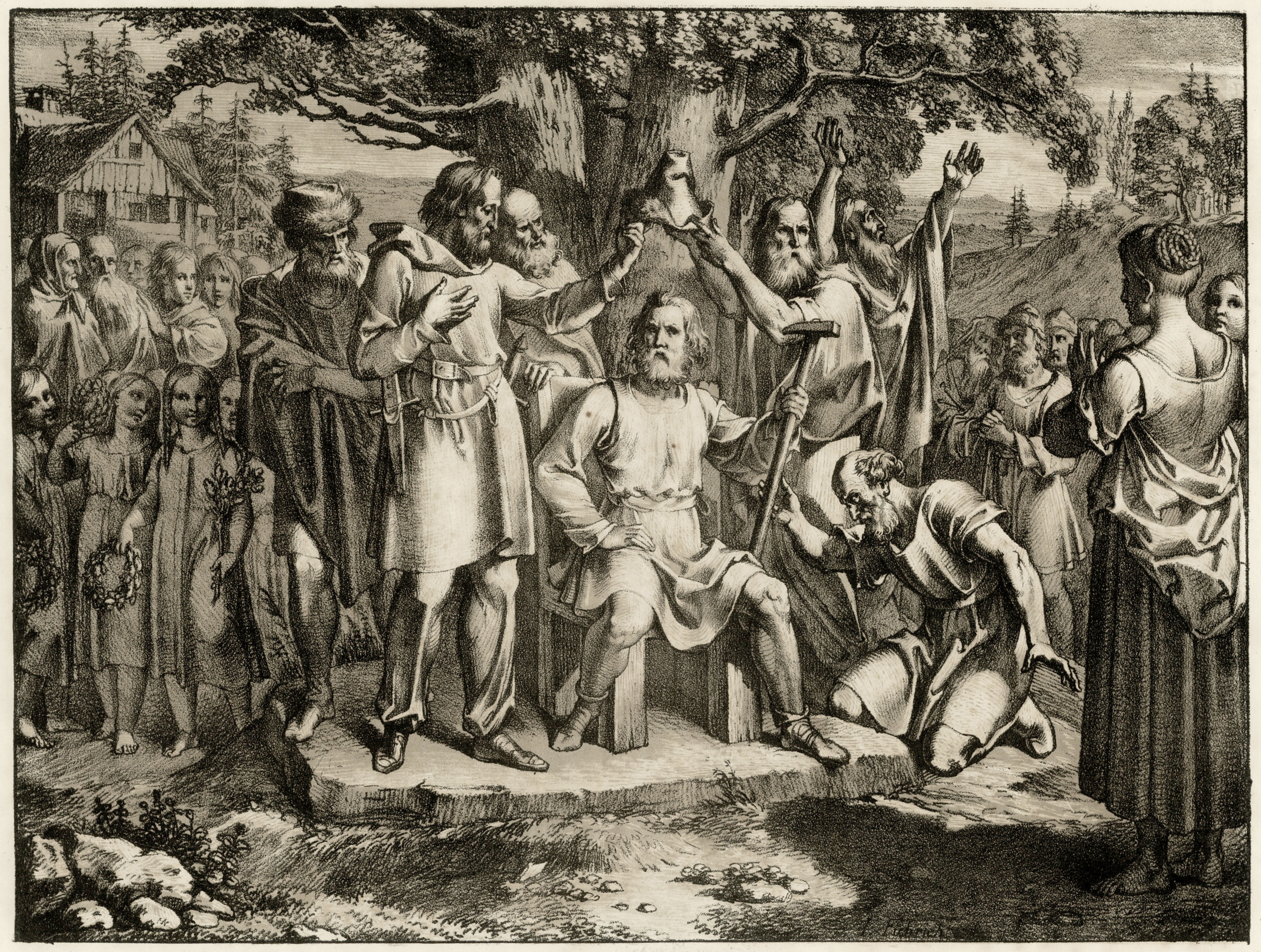
Election of Krok as judge, lithograph by Joseph von Führich (1820).

František Palacký argued that the figure of Krok was influenced by the ruler Sámo; however, other authors, eager to prove a supposed Celtic origin of the Czech people, have been quick to say that the name Krok may have arisen from the Celtic name Crocco. Other theorists suggest a connection with Krakus (Krak), a mythical Polish prince and the presumed founder of Kraków.

Another theory suggests the names of the Přemysl ancestors arose from a mistaken interpretation by Cosmas. According to postulation by Vladimír Karbusický, Cosmas likely contrived them when trying to read a lost Latin transcription of an old-Slavonic message. When the ancestral names are combined and reassessed, they can roughly cohere an assumed text:

"Krok' kazi tetha lubossa premisl nezamisl mna ta voj'n ni zla kr'z mis neklan gosti vit..."

In modern English, this may translate to:

"Halt your steps, Tetha, and rather think, I do not intend war or evil upon you, we do not bow to the cross, we welcome guests..."

The alleged message is speculated to be from the Czech princes to the Franks, perhaps in relation to the Battle of Zásek c. 849 described in the Annales Fuldenses.

Duke Krok Přemyslid dynasty
New title Legendary founder	Duke of Bohemia (legendary) fl. c. 7th century	Succeeded by Libuše
