= Vlastislav (mythological prince) =

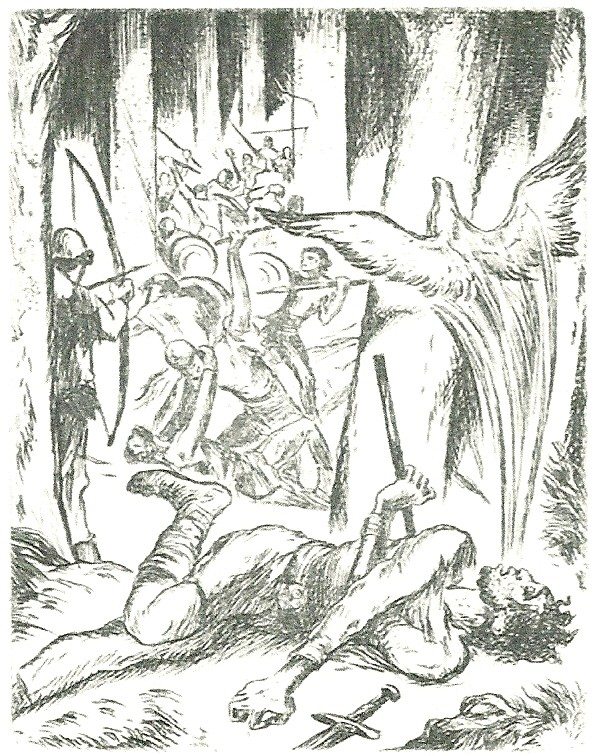
Death of Vlastislav

Vlastislav was a mythological prince of Lucko (by Žatec). Son of legendary Czech prince Vojen, a brother of another prince Vnislav.

However, the Chronicle of Dalimil and Cosmas disagree on what happened after the death of Prince Nezamysl.

By Dalimil: After him Mnata, then Voyen, of whom we know only that he was still full of strength when he divided the land among his sons.

By Kosmas: Lucko ceased the rule of prince Neklan whose army in the conflict by Tursko scored a hard Lucko's army of Vlastislav.

Dalimil writes: The people of Lucko were a Bohemian tribe by legend and their rulers of Přemyslids Dynasty.

Kosmas writes: After Vojen lived out his life, the principality was ruled by Vnislav. Dalimil, on the other hand, states that Vojen divides his land among his sons: Lucko gives Vlastislav, Bohemia under the administration of Unislav (Vnislav). In that case, Prince Vlastislav of Luck would also have been a Přemyslid, brother of Prince Vnislav.

In the Slovak novel Radhostov mec Prince Vlastislov worships the god Cernobon, who bestows the ability to change into a wolf in exchange for Vlastislov's loyalty.
