= Vojen =

Bohemian mythical prince

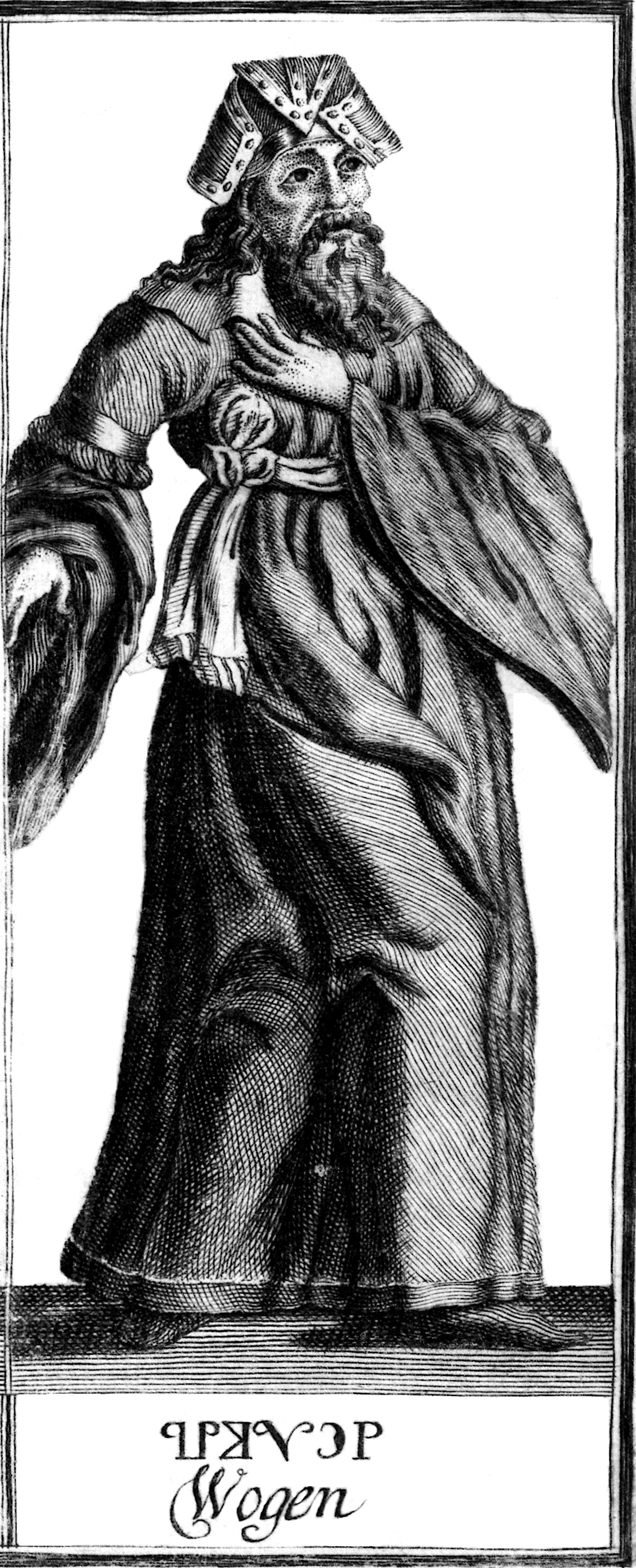
Wogen

Vojen was the third of the seven Bohemian mythical princes between the (also mythical) founder of the Přemyslid dynasty Přemysl the Ploughman and the first historical prince Bořivoj. The names of the princes were first recorded in Cosmas chronicle and then transmitted into the most of historical books of the 19th century including František Palacký's The History of the Czech Nation in Bohemia and Moravia.

One theory about the number of the princes is propped on the frescoes on the walls of the Rotunda in Znojmo, Moravia but Anežka Merhautová claimed that the frescoes depict all the members of the Přemyslid dynasty including the Moravian junior princes.

== Origin of the name ==
Vojen's name is thought to be derived from the Slavonic word "vojna" meaning war. Záviš Kalandra thought the names of the seven princes were cryptical names of ancient Slavonic days of the week - Vojen being the third - Tuesday, in Latin Martis dies whereas Mars was the god of War.

Another theory suggests the names of the Přemysl ancestors arose from a mistaken interpretation by Cosmas. According to postulation by Vladimír Karbusický, Cosmas likely contrived them when trying to read a lost Latin transcription of an old-Slavonic message. When the ancestral names are combined and reassessed, they can roughly cohere an assumed text:

"Krok‘ kazi tetha lubossa premisl nezamisl mna ta voj‘n ni zla kr‘z mis neklan gosti vit..."

In modern English, this may translate to:

"Halt your steps, Tetha, and rather think, I do not intend war or evil upon you, we do not bow to the cross, we welcome guests..."

The alleged message is speculated to be from the Czech princes to the Franks, perhaps in relation to the Battle of Zásek c. 849 described in the Annales Fuldenses.

== Seven mythical princes after Přemysl ==
Mythical Princes of Bohemia
Nezamysl
Mnata
Vojen
Vnislav
Křesomysl
Neklan
Hostivít
