= Nezamysl =

Mythical Bohemian prince

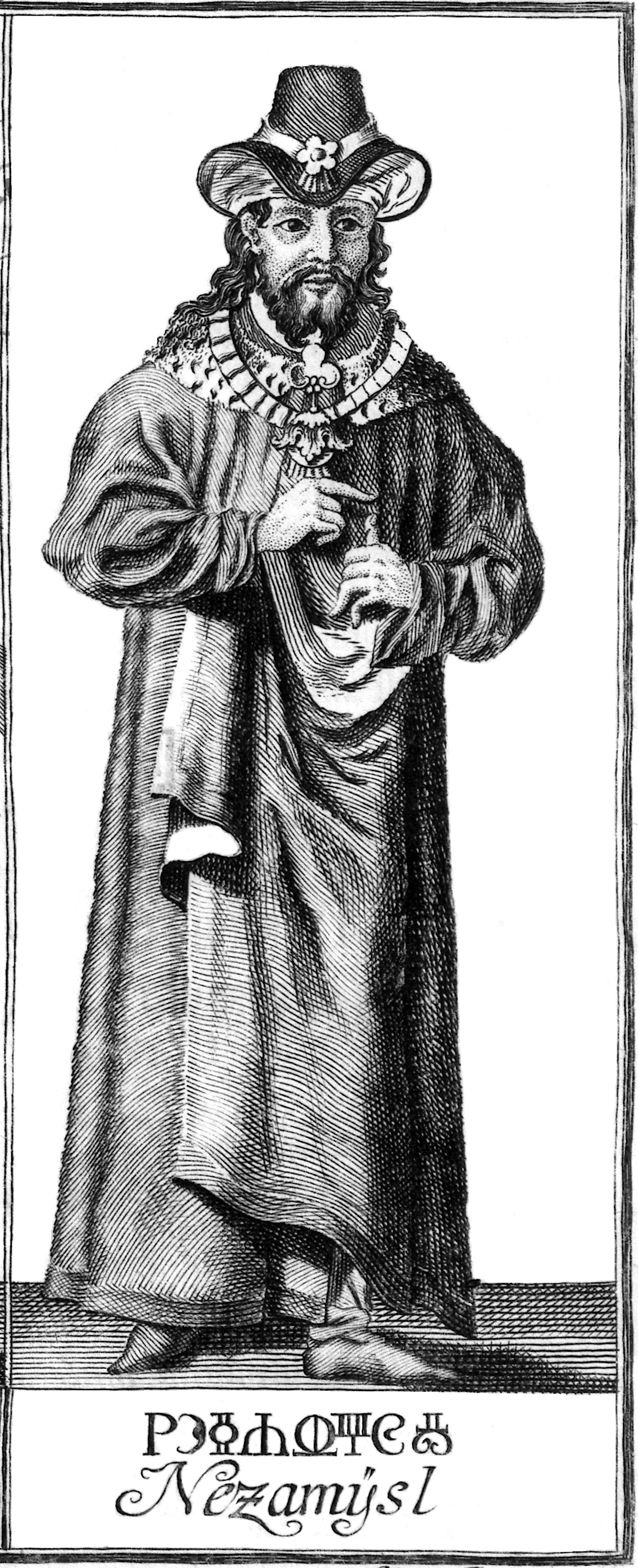
Nezamysl

Nezamysl was the first of the seven Bohemian mythical princes between the (also mythical) founder of the Přemyslid dynasty Přemysl the Ploughman and the first historical prince Bořivoj. The names of the princes were first recorded in Cosmas chronicle and then transmitted into most historical works up into the 19th century, including František Palacký's The History of the Czech Nation in Bohemia and Moravia (1836).

One theory connects the number of princes to the frescoes on the "Ducal Rotunda" of the Virgin Mary and St Catherine in Znojmo, Moravia, which date back to the late 11th or early 12th century. However, Anežka Merhautová suggested that the frescoes depict all the members of the Přemyslid dynasty including the Moravian junior princes at the time when it was painted, rather than a Přemyslid pedigree.

== Origin of the name ==
Nezamysl's name is thought to be derived from the opposite meaning to Přemysl - "not thinking", cf. Roman "Simplicius". Záviš Kalandra thought the names of the seven princes were cryptical names of ancient Slavonic days of the week - Nezamysl being the first - Sunday when we do not think/intend to work.

Another theory suggests the names of the Přemysl ancestors arose from a mistaken interpretation by Cosmas. According to postulation by Vladimír Karbusický, Cosmas likely contrived them when trying to read a lost Latin transcription of an old-Slavonic message. When the ancestral names are combined and reassessed, they can roughly cohere an assumed text:

"Krok‘ kazi tetha lubossa premisl nezamisl mna ta voj‘n ni zla kr‘z mis neklan gosti vit..."

In modern English, this may translate to:

"Halt your steps, Tetha, and rather think, I do not intend war or evil upon you, we do not bow to the cross, we welcome guests..."

The alleged message is speculated to be from the Czech princes to the Franks, perhaps in relation to the Battle of Zásek c. 849 described in the Annales Fuldenses.

== Seven mythical princes after Přemysl ==
Mythical Princes of Bohemia
Nezamysl
Mnata
Vojen
Vnislav
Křesomysl
Neklan
Hostivít

== In popular culture ==
In the game Crusader Kings II, Nezamysl is a playable as the king of Bohemia despite the dubiousness of his existence.
