= Libuše =

Legendary princess and ancestor of the Czech people

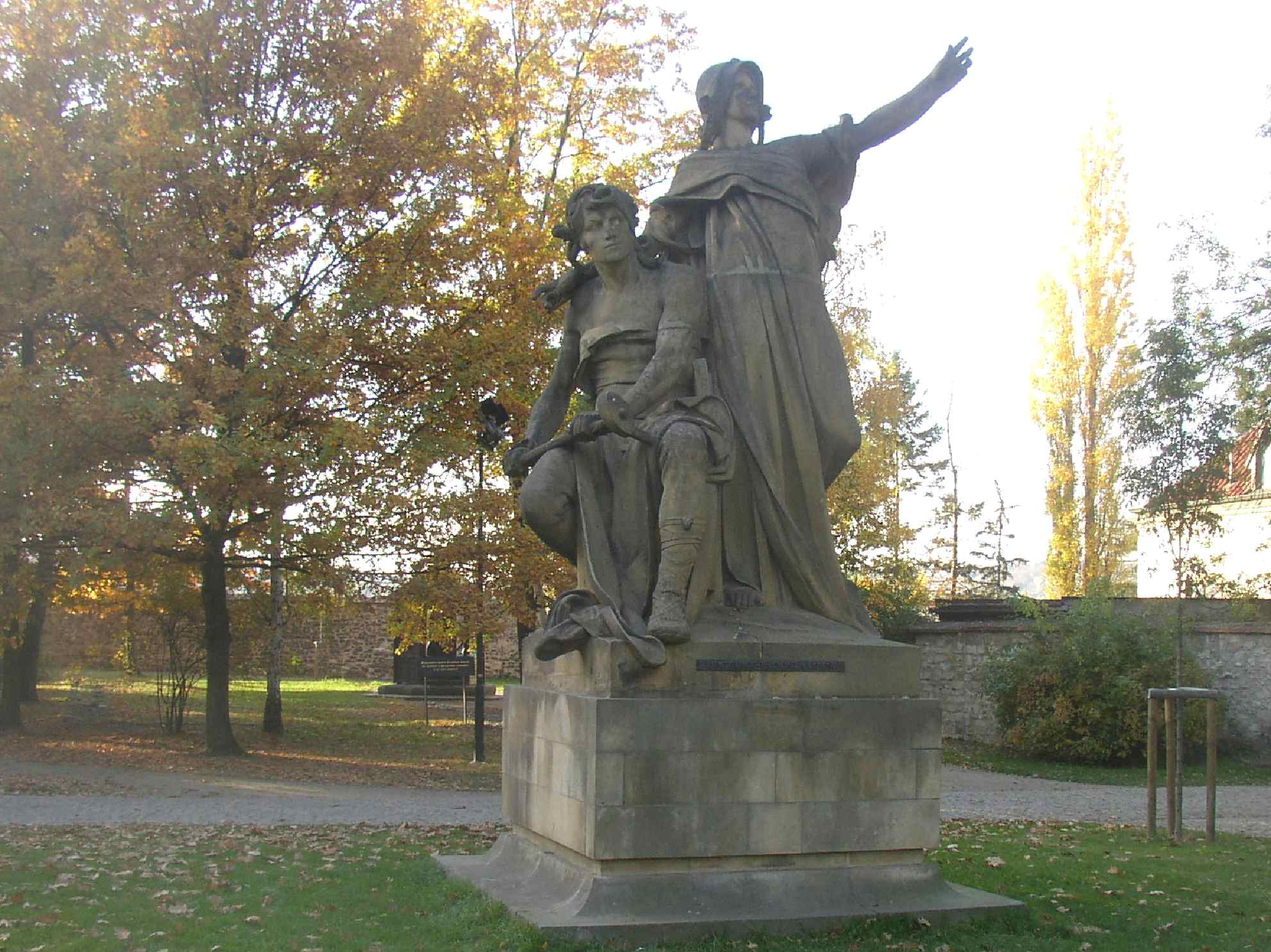
Libuše and Přemysl, sculpture by Josef Václav Myslbek (1881), today in Vyšehrad

Libuše, Libussa, Libushe or, historically Lubossa, is a legendary ancestor of the Přemyslid dynasty and the Czech people as a whole. According to legend, she was the youngest but wisest of three sisters, who became queen after their father died; she married a ploughman, Přemysl, with whom she founded the Přemyslid dynasty, and prophesied and founded the city of Prague in the 8th century.

== Legend ==
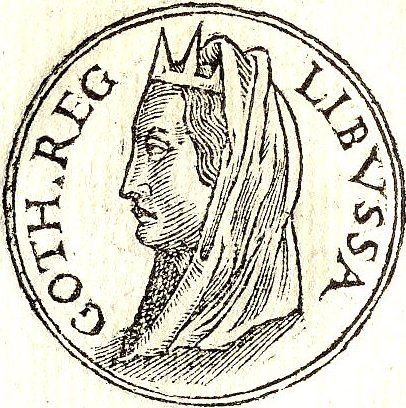
"Libussa Goth. Reg." ("Libussa, Queen of the Goths") from Promptuarii Iconum Insigniorum (1553)

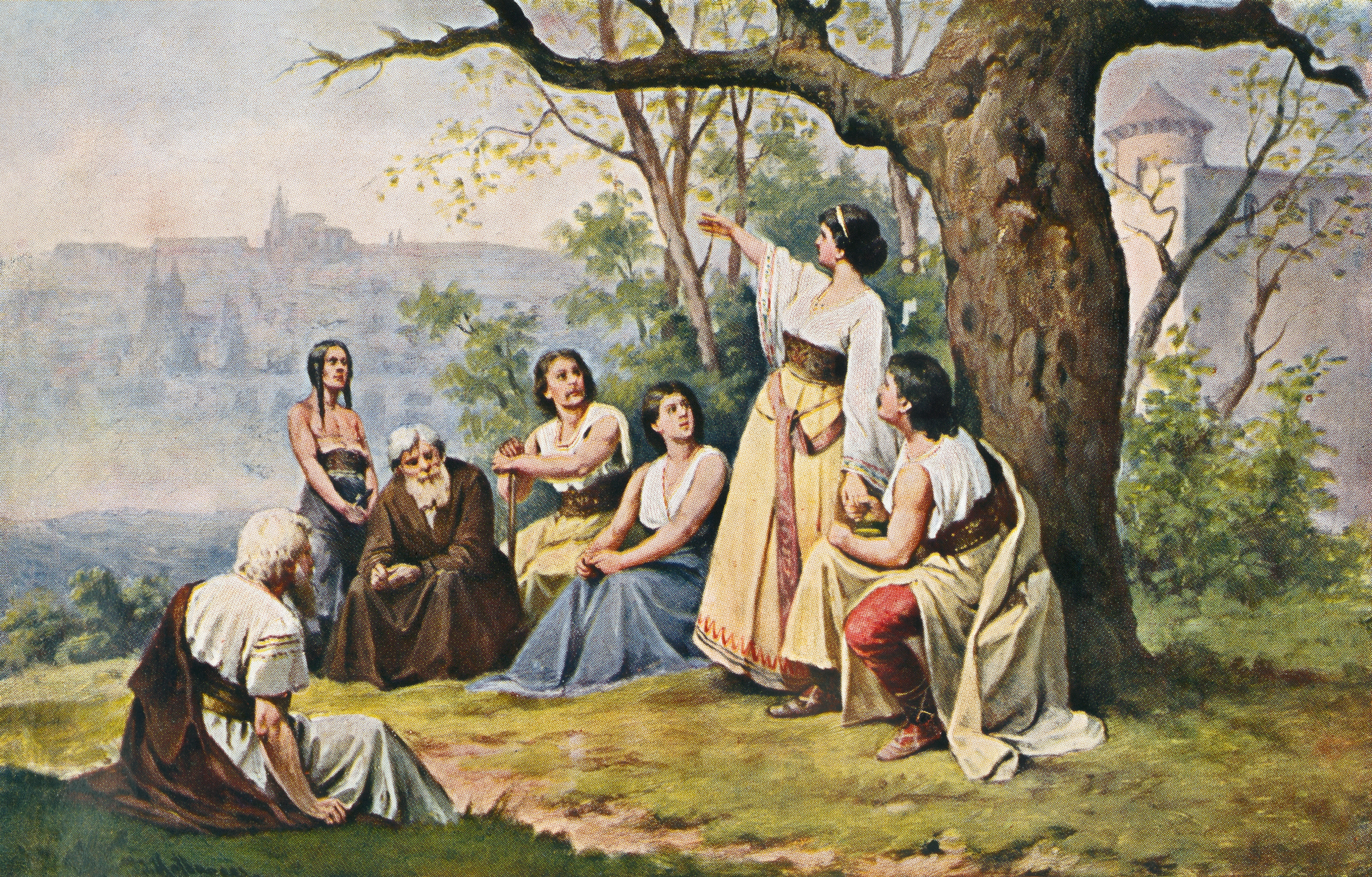
"Princess Libuše prophesies the glory of Prague" (Joseph Mathauser)

Libuše is said to have been the youngest daughter of the equally mythical Czech ruler Krok. The legend goes that she was the wisest of the three sisters, and while her sister Kazi was a healer and Teta was a magician, she had the gift of seeing the future, and was chosen by her father as his successor, to judge over the people. According to legends she prophesied from her castle at Libušín, though later legends say it was Vyšehrad.

Legend says that Libuše came out on a rocky cliff high above the Vltava and prophesied: "I see a great city whose glory will touch the stars." On the site she ordered to build a castle and a town called Prague.

Although she proved herself as a wise chieftain, the male part of the tribe was displeased that their ruler was a woman and demanded that she marry, but she had fallen in love with a ploughman, Přemysl. She therefore related a vision in which she saw a farmer with one broken sandal, ploughing a field, or in other versions of the legend, eating from an iron table. She instructed her councilmen to seek out this man by letting a horse loose at a junction; they followed it to the village of Stadice and found Přemysl exactly as she had said (either ploughing a field, or using an iron plough as a makeshift table). The two grandees who found Přemysl brought him to the princely palace where Libuše married him, and Přemysl the Ploughman thus became ruler. They went on to have three sons: Radobyl, Lidomir, and Nezamysl who continued the Přemyslid dynasty in the Czech lands.

In another legend, she commanded her councillors to found a city at the place where they found a man making the best of use of his teeth at midday. They set off and at midday found a man sawing a block of wood (using his saw's teeth) when everyone else was eating; when they asked him what he was making he replied "Prah" (which in Czech means "threshold") and so Libuše named the city Prague (Czech: "Praha").

== Arts ==
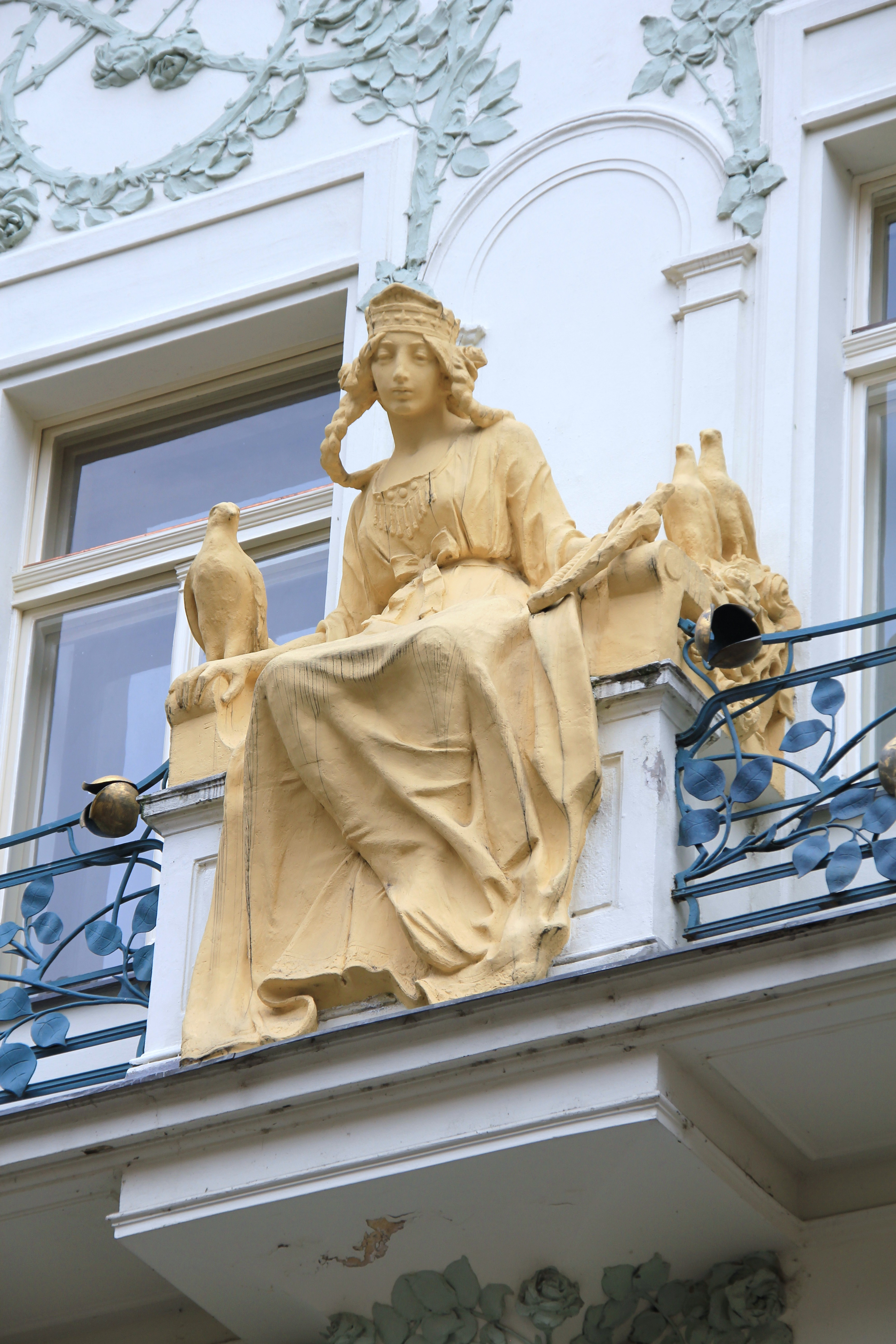
Libuše at Karlova Street, Prague

The story of Libuše and Přemysl was recounted in detail in the 12th century by Cosmas of Prague in his Chronica Boëmorum.

Another early account was included in Jan Dubravius' 1552 chronicle Historia regni Bohemiae, and Johann Karl August Musäus used this and Aeneas Silvius' Cardinalis de Bohemarum Origine ac Gestis Historia to write his version of the legend as "Libussa", which he included in his Volksmärchen der Deutschen (volume 3, 1784).

The mythical figure of Libuše gave material for several dramatic works, including Libussa, a tragedy by Franz Grillparzer, Libuše, an opera by Bedřich Smetana, and Pole a palisáda, a novel by Miloš Urban. She is also featured as a character in Edward Einhorn's play, Rudolf II.

In 2009, an American-Czech film version of the Libuše and Přemysl story was released under the name The Pagan Queen.

Minor planet 264 Libussa is named in her honor.

== Theories of origin ==
A notable theory of origin suggests the names of the Přemysl ancestors arose from a mistaken interpretation by Cosmas. According to postulation by Vladimír Karbusický, Cosmas likely contrived them when trying to read a lost Latin transcription of an old-Slavonic message. When the ancestral names are combined and reassessed, they can roughly cohere an assumed text:

"Krok‘ kazi tetha lubossa premisl nezamisl mna ta voj‘n ni zla kr‘z mis neklan gosti vit..."

In modern English, this may translate to:

"Halt your steps, Tetha, and rather think, I do not intend war or evil upon you, we do not bow to the cross, we welcome guests..."

The alleged message is speculated to be from the Czech princes to the Franks, perhaps in relation to the Battle of Zásek c. 849 described in the Annales Fuldenses.

== See also ==
- List of rulers of Bohemia
- Libuse, Louisiana, a town in the United States named for Libuše by its Czech immigrant founders
