= Přemysl the Ploughman =

Bohemian peasant and husband of Princess Libuše

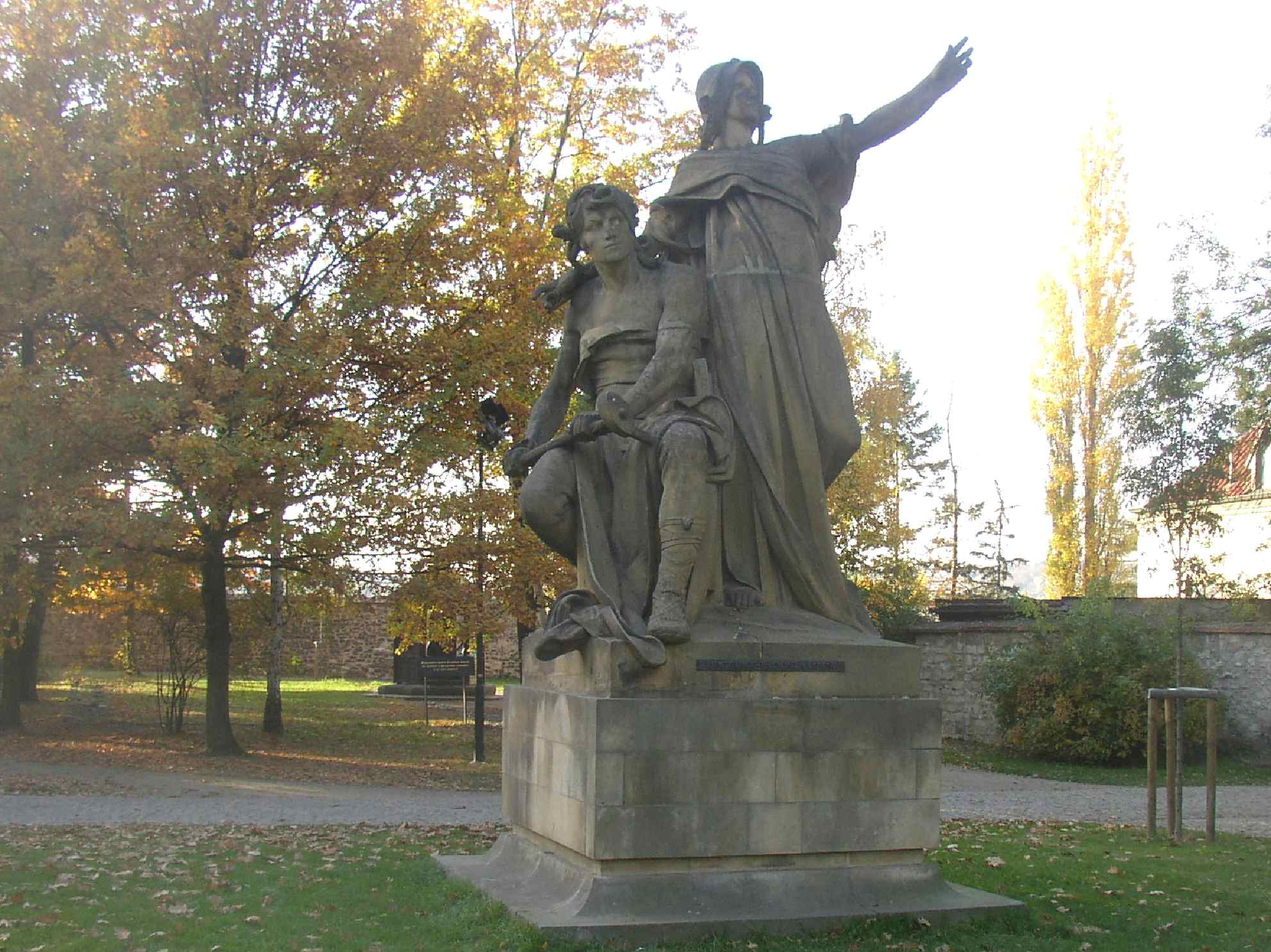
Libuše and Přemysl (1881–1890) by Josef Václav Myslbek

Closeup of the sculpture in 2012 at Vyšehrad

Přemysl the Ploughman (Czech pronunciation: [ˈpr̝̊ɛmɪsl̩ ˈoraːtʃ] Přemysl Oráč; English: Premysl, Przemysl or Primislaus (Note: Franz Grillparzer uses the name "Primislaus" in his drama Libussa, as does Thomas Carlyle in his translation of Johann Karl August Musäus' "Libussa".)) was the legendary husband of Libuše, and ancestor of the Přemyslid dynasty, containing the line of princes (dukes) and kings which ruled in the Lands of the Bohemian Crown from 873 or earlier until the murder of Wenceslaus III in 1306.

== Legend ==
According to a legend, Přemysl was a free peasant of the village of Stadice who attracted the notice of Libuše, daughter of a certain Krok, who ruled over a large part of Bohemia. Libuše succeeded her father, and her councillors demanded that she marry, but because Přemysl was not a nobleman she recounted a vision in which they would follow a horse let loose at a junction, and follow it to find her future husband, making it appear as if it was the will of fate not her own wish. Two versions of the legend exist, one in where they are to find a man ploughing a field with one broken sandal, and another in which the man would be sitting in the shade of a single tree, eating from an iron table (his plough). They did so and found Přemysl exactly as foretold.

Přemysl married Libuše, the traditional foundress of Prague, and became prince of the Bohemian Czechs. However, according to the legends, because they found him before he had finished ploughing the field famine was anticipated for the land and did actually come about. He was also said to have planted his hazel-wood staff in the ground before he left, which then grew three sprouts, two of which died but the third continued to grow; this was an omen that his first two sons with Libuše, Radobyl and Lidomir, would die, but their third son, Nezamysl would live and continue the Přemyslid dynasty. Legend has it that the staff continued to grow, and the inhabitants of the neighbouring town were given a grant exempting them from taxes, except for a pint of hazel nuts each year, a tradition which continued into the reign of Charles IV, Holy Roman Emperor, from whom Pope Pius II claimed to have seen a charter renewing the exemption.

He was also said to have removed his peasant's bast shoes before donning the royal robe when he was discovered, and ordered the councillors to bring the shoes with them and keep them as a reminder to the people that a peasant had risen to the highest rank, and to his successors to be humble, remember their origin, and defend the peasantry. The custom of exhibiting a pair of bast shoes at the coronation of the kings of Bohemia was said to have continued throughout the Přemyslid dynasty.

The Přemyslid dynasty became extinct in the male line when Wenceslaus III died, but through women the title to Bohemia passed from the Přemyslids to the Luxembourgs and later to the houses of Jagiello, Habsburg and Habsburg-Lorraine.

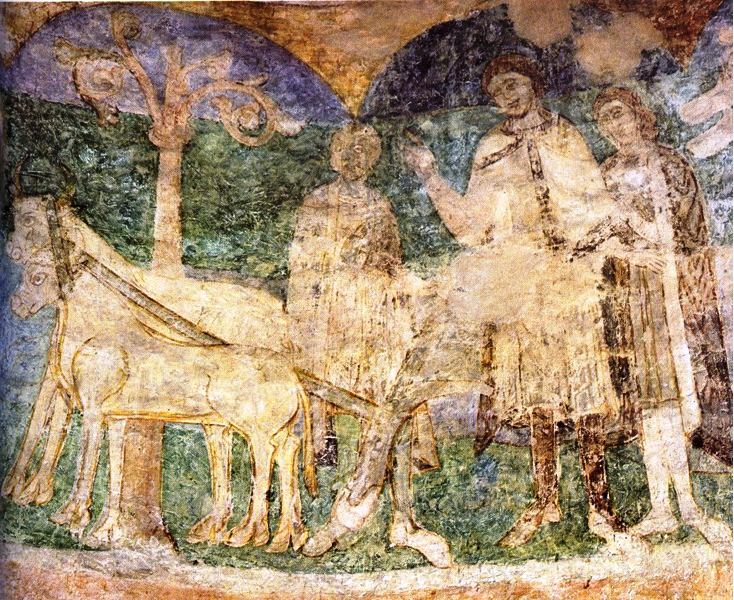
Přemysl the Ploughman, as depicted in the XI^{th} century fresco in the Rotunda of St. Catherine in Znojmo

== Medieval literary traditions ==
The earliest work mentioning the story about Přemysl and Libuše could be the so-called Christian Legende (Latin title: Vita et passio sancti Vencaslai et sanctae Ludmilae aviae eius) from the end of 10th century, though some historians consider this legend to be a falsum from 12th or 13th century. The legend is further described in the Cosmas Chronicle (Latin title: Chronica Boemorum) written between 1119 and 1125, Short writing about Cyril and Methodius (Latin title: Diffundente sole) from the late 12th century and the Chronicle of Dalimil from the beginning of 14th century.

Several times the legend was recorded during the reign of king and emperor Charles IV in the late 14th century. E.g., the so-called New Chronicle of Bohemiae by Přibík Pulkava and in the chronicle compiled by Giovanni de' Marignolli.

== Alternative theories ==
One modern theory of origin suggests the names of the early Přemysl ancestors actually arose from a mistaken interpretation by Cosmas. According to postulation by Vladimír Karbusický, Cosmas likely contrived them when trying to read a lost Latin transcription of an old-Slavonic message. When the ancestral names are combined and reassessed, they can roughly cohere an assumed text:

"Krok‘ kazi tetha lubossa premisl nezamisl mna ta voj‘n ni zla kr‘z mis neklan gosti vit..."

In modern English, this may translate to:

"Halt your steps, Tetha, and rather think, I do not intend war or evil upon you, we do not bow to the cross, we welcome guests..."

The alleged message is speculated to be from the Czech princes to the Franks, perhaps in relation to the Battle of Zásek c. 849 described in the Annales Fuldenses.

This theory of Karbusický, as well as other similar theories (e.g. theory of Záviš Kalandra that the names of legendary Přemyslid dukes are in fact translated Roman and German names of the days of the week; or theory of Jaroslav Zástěra that the legendary Přemyslid dukes were in fact dukes of Great Moravia) are not accepted by scholars.

== Arts ==
In addition to appearing in works named for Libuše, Přemysl is also a subject of the writings of Wenceslaus Hajek of Libočany published in 1541, a 1779 ballad by Johann Gottfried Herder, fairy tales by Johann Karl August Musäus, and Clemens Brentano's 1815 The Founding of Prague.

== See also ==
- List of Czech rulers

== Bibliography ==
- František Palacký: Geschichte von Böhmen Band 1 (Prague, 1844).
