= Historia Francorum abbreviata =

The Historia Francorum abbreviata ('Abbreviated History of the Franks') is a Latin chronicle of Francia covering the years 680–898. It consists mainly of extracts from the Annals of Fulda with a few sparse additions. The chronology of the work, however, is defective. For example, it moves events from 855 to 856.

Georg Pertz notes only two sentences in the chronicle that are unique to it. Under the year 749, it states that "Pippin remained in the kingdom together with his brother Grifo, and they managed the affairs of the kingdom very well" (Pipinus remansit in regno una cum fratre Griphone, et rem regni optime gesserunt). Under 878, after describing a pestilence that struck cattle and humans in Germany, it states that "the Slavs, Dalmatians, Sorbs and Bohemians are the same" (Slavi Dalmatae Soavi [Sorabi] Bohemi idem sunt). Unlike its source, the Historia describes a celestial phenomenon in 840 as "small starlike fires" (igniculi similes stellis), which Umberto Dall'Olmo takes to be a meteor shower.

The Historia was first published in the 17th century by André Duchesne based on a copy made by Gabriel Naudé from a manuscript in Rome. The supposed compiler of the work, Petrus Bibliothecarius ('Peter the Librarian'), is otherwise unknown. He is generally presumed to have been active in the late 9th century.
