= Konstantin von Höfler =

German historian, publicist, anti-nationalist politician and poet

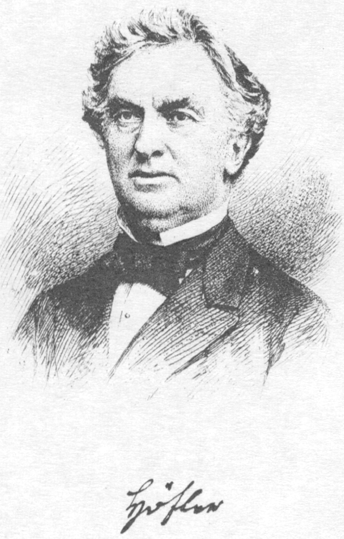
Konstantin von Höfler

Konstantin von Höfler (26 March 1811 – 29 December 1898) was a German church and general historian, publicist, ennobled anti-nationalist politician and poet.

== Biography and works ==
He was born at Memmingen in Bavaria (southern Germany) on 26 March 1811; died at Prague, 29 December 1898. After finishing his studies in the gymnasia at Munich and Landshut, he studied first jurisprudence and then history at the Ludwig-Maximilians-Universität München under Guido Görres, Ignaz von Döllinger and especially Friedrich Wilhelm Joseph Schelling, and received his degree in 1831 on presenting the dissertation "Ueber die Anfänge der griechischen Geschichte" [About the Beginnings of Greek History]. Aided by a pension from the government, he studied two more years at the University of Göttingen, where he published a "Geschichte der englischen Civilliste" [History of the English Civil List].

He then went to Italy, residing chiefly at Florence and Rome, and worked there industriously in the examination of original sources. Returning to Munich, he accepted the editorship of the official Münchener Zeitung in order to earn a subsistence, but while thus engaged he had by 1838 qualified himself as a privatdozent [private(ly sponsored) professor] in history at the Ludwig-Maximilians-Universität München. The following year, he became extraordinary — in 1841 ordinary professor of history; in 1842 he became a member of the Academy of Sciences. In 1839, he published "Die deutschen Päpste" [The German Popes] in two volumes. After this he devoted himself to his duties as professor until 1846, when he fell into disfavour with King Ludwig I of Bavaria on account of the position he took, along with several other professors, in the popular agitation against the relations of the king with the dancer Lola Montez. He expressed his views on the subject in "Concordat und Constitutionseid der Katholiken in Bayern" [Concordat and the Silk Constitution of Catholics in Bavaria], and for this was removed from his university position on 26 March 1847.

Although the king, after some months, took Höfler again into the government service, he was, nevertheless, transferred to Bamberg (in Upper Franconia) as keeper of the district archives. With his accustomed zeal he began the study of Franconian history and published in 1849–52 as the fruit of his investigations: "Quellensammlung für fränkische Geschichte" [Collection of Sources for Franconian History], in four volumes, and in 1852–53 "Fränkische Studien" [Franconian Studies], parts I–V. During the same period, in 1850, he issued "Bayern, sein Recht und seine Geschichte" [Bavaria, Its Law and History] (1850) and "Ueber die politische Reformbewegung in Deutschland im Mittelalter und den Anteil Bayerns an derselben" [On the Political Reform Movement in Germany and Bavaria's Share In It]. Further, in the midst of these labours, he began the preparation of his history textbook Lehrbuch der Geschichte [Textbook of History] which appeared in 1856.

In 1851, when the Austrian school system was reorganized, Count Thun called Höfler as professor of history to Prague where he taught with great success until he retired on a pension in 1882. In 1865, he became a member of the Bohemian Diet, and in 1872 a life member of the Austrian House of Lords. In this latter year, he was raised to the hereditary nobility and received the order of the Iron Crown. In politics, he was one of the leaders of the German-Bohemian party, a branch of the constitutional party of that period, and was one of the chief opponents of the Czechs.

From 1872, however, he almost practically retired from politics, partly from the increasing opposition which grew up in the German parties in Austria against "Catholicism", partly because the clerical party was drawing closer to the Slavs. Conflicts were unavoidable; on the one hand he was a thorough German, absolutely convinced of the great mission of the Germans in Austria, on the other he was one of the most faithful sons of the Catholic Church. Consequently, he gradually withdrew from party politics, without losing, however, his strong interest in the struggles of the mostly anticlerical German-Bohemians against the Czechs, and devoted himself entirely to the cultivation of German sentiment and intellectual life. By his activity, both as teacher and author, he became the founder of the modern school of German-Bohemian historical research, which received enthusiastic support from the Society founded by him, in 1862, for the study of the history of the German element in Bohemia, and in consequence ranks as one of the most deservedly respected historians of Austria.

Höfler gave special attention to the history of the Hussite movement and reached the conclusion that it was directed less against the papacy than against the German power in Bohemia and against the cities. He characterized the movement as "an unsympathetic historical phenomenon, a movement foredoomed to failure, which soon became a burden to itself". He saw in Jan Hus only an antagonist of Germanism, the destroyer of the University of Prague and of the sciences. His works on Hussitism are:

- Geschichtsschreiber der husitischen Bewegung ("Historian of the Hussite Movement", 1856–66), in three volumes
- Magister Johannes Hus und der Abzug der deutschen Professoren und Studenten aus Prag 1409 ("Master John Hus and the Withdrawal of German Professors and Students from Prague, 1409", 1864)
- Concilia Pragensia, 1353–1413 ("Pragensian Reconciliation, 1353–1413", 1862)

These historical investigations involved Höfler in a violent literary feud with František Palacký, the official historiographer of Bohemia, an enthusiastic representative of Czech interests, and the indefatigable champion of Slavic supremacy in Bohemia. But as the scientific proofs produced by Höfler were indisputable he was victorious in this controversy and broke down Palacký's hitherto unquestioned authority as a historian. These exhaustive studies in Bohemian history led Höfler to deeper research into the history of the Slavic races. In his "Abhandlungen aus dem Gebiete der slawischen Geschichte" [Treatises on the Subject of Slavic History] (1879–82), five volumes, he showed how the Slavic element had always warred against the German element; in the same work he emphasized strongly the importance of the German element in the development of Bohemia.

In other works Höfler treated the ecclesiastical reform movements among the Romanic peoples. These include:

- Die romanische Welt und ihr Verhältnis zu den Reformideen des Mittelalters ("The Roman World and their Relationship to the Reform Ideas of the Middle Ages", 1878)
- Der Aufstand der kastillianischen Städte gegen Karl V ("The Revolt of the Castilian Cities Against Charles V", 1876)
- Zur Kritik und Quellenkunde der ersten Regierungsjahre Kaiser Karls V ("For a Criticism and Source Study of the First Years of the Reign of Emperor Charles V", 1876–83), in three parts
- Der deutsche Kaiser und der letzte deutsche Papst, Karl V und Adrian VI ("The Last German Emperor and the German Pope, Adrian VI and Charles V", 1876)
- Papst Adrian VI ("Pope Adrian VI", 1880), in which he proves that this pope was the author of Catholic reform in the sixteenth century.

Höfler's contributions to the history of the Hohenzollern family are to be found in:

- Denkwürdigkeiten des Ritters Ludwig von Eyb ("Memoirs of the Knight Ludwig of Eyb", 1849)
- Barbara, Markgräfin von Brandenburg ("Barbara, Margrave of Brandenburg", 1867)

Other works by Höfler include:

- two volumes of Abhandlungen zur Geschichte Oesterreichs ("Essays on the History of Austria", 1871–72)
- two volumes of Monumenta Hispanica ("Spanish Monuments", 1881–82)
- Kritische Untersuchungen über die Quellen der Geschichte König Phiipps des Schönen ("Critical Studies on the Sources of the History of King Phiipps of Schönen", 1883)
- Bonifatius, der Apostel der Deutschen und die Slawenapostel Konstantinos (Cyrillus) und Methodius ("Boniface, the Apostle of the Germans and the Slav Apostles Constantine (Cyril) and Methodius", 1887)

He also published many papers in journals including:

- Denkschriften der k.k. Akademie der Wissenschaften ("Proceedings of the K.K. Academy of Sciences")
- Fontes rerum Austriacarum ("Rerum Austriacarum Sources")
- Zeitschrift des Vereins für die Geschichte der Deutschen in Böhmen ("Journal for the History of the Germans in Bohemia")

Höfler also wrote a number of historical dramas in verse, as well as elegant and thoughtful epigrams; his poetical works, however, met with but moderate success.

Attribution
