= 264 Libussa =

Main belt asteroid

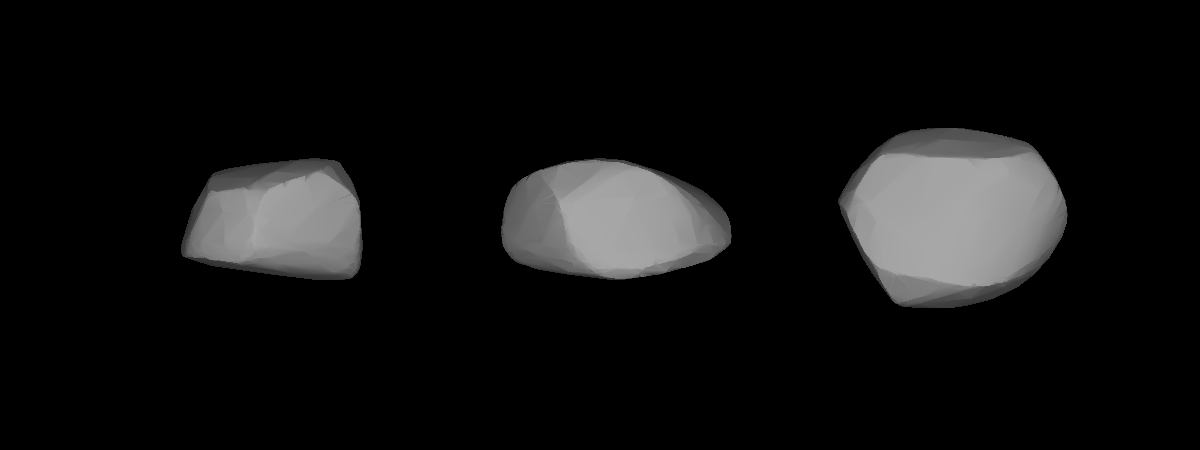
- A three-dimensional model of 264 Libussa based on its lightcurve

Discovery
- Discovered by: C. H. F. Peters
- Discovery date: 22 December 1886

Designations
- Pronunciation: German: [ˈliːbʊsaː]
- Named after: Libuše
- Alternative designations: A886 YA
- Minor planet category: Main belt

Orbital characteristics
- Epoch 31 July 2016 (JD 2457600.5)
- Uncertainty parameter 0
- Observation arc: 123.02 yr (44934 d)
- Aphelion: 3.1799 AU (475.71 Gm)
- Perihelion: 2.41375 AU (361.092 Gm)
- Semi-major axis: 2.79681 AU (418.397 Gm)
- Eccentricity: 0.13696
- Orbital period (sidereal): 4.68 yr (1708.4 d)
- Average orbital speed: 17.81 km/s
- Mean anomaly: 254.88°
- Mean motion: 0° 12^{m} 38.592^{s} / day
- Inclination: 10.426°
- Longitude of ascending node: 49.608°
- Argument of perihelion: 340.891°

Physical characteristics
- Dimensions: 50.48±2.7 km
- Synodic rotation period: 9.2276 h (0.38448 d)
- Geometric albedo: 0.2971±0.034
- Spectral type: S
- Absolute magnitude (H): 8.42

264 Libussa is a Main belt asteroid that was discovered by C. H. F. Peters on 22 December 1886, in Clinton, New York and was named after Libussa, the legendary founder of Prague. It is classified as an S-type asteroid.

Photometric observations of this asteroid at the Organ Mesa Observatory in Las Cruces, New Mexico, in 2008 gave an asymmetrical, bimodal light curve with a period of 9.2276 ± 0.0002 hours and a brightness variation of 0.33 ± 0.03 in magnitude. Observation from the W. M. Keck Observatory show an angular size of 57 mas, which is close to the resolution limit of the instrument. The estimated maximum size of the asteroid is about 66 ± 7 km. It has an asymmetrical shape with a size ratio of more than 1.22 between the major and minor axes.

Between 2005 and 2021, 264 Libussa has been observed to occult five stars.
