= Josef Mathauser =

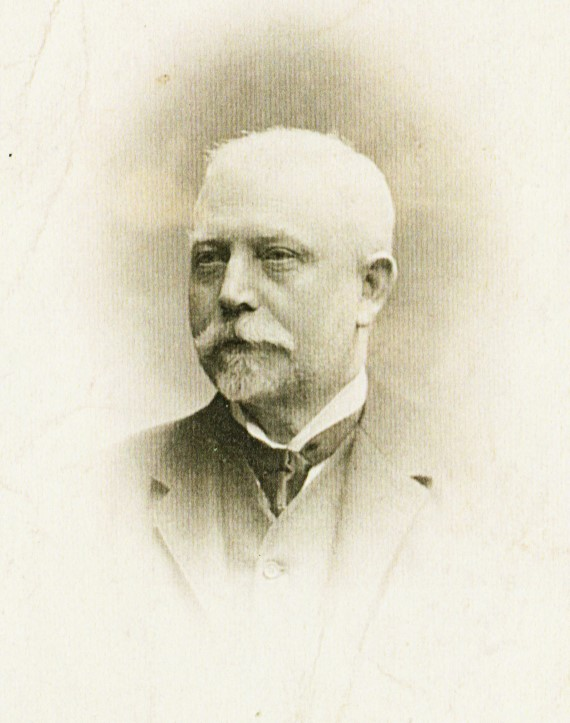
Josef Mathauser

Josef Mathauser (24 July 1846 in Staňkov – 10 January 1917 in Prague) was a Czech painter.

== Work ==
Mathauser is known for his religious paintings, and for his series of "History of the Czech Nation in Pictures".

Among his religious works are the Stations of the Cross in the Church of the Assumption of the Virgin Mary in Mariánské Lázně (1886–1887) and an altar in the Church of Saints Peter and Paul, and the restoration of religious scenes at Svatá Hora Monastery in Příbram (1895).

Josef’s works have gone up for sale at public auction 44 times, and he has a turnover of €360 with a world ranking of 85,137. His works are mainly sold in Austria.

He is buried at Vinohrady Cemetery in Prague.
