= Přemyslid dynasty =

Bohemian royal dynasty during the Middle Ages

- Country: Duchy of Bohemia; Kingdom of Bohemia; Margraviate of Moravia; Duchy of Opava; Duchies of Silesia; Kingdom of Poland; Kingdom of Hungary; Duchy of Austria
- Founded: 867; 1159 years ago
- Founder: Přemysl the Ploughman (Mythical or Legendary); Bořivoj I (Historical)
- Final ruler: Wenceslaus III of Bohemia
- Titles: King and Duke of Bohemia (Czech: Český král); King of Hungary; King of Poland; Duke of Olomouc; Duke of Brno; Duke of Znojmo; Duke of Opava; Duke of Racibórz; Duke of Münsterberg; Duke of Krnov; Margrave of Moravia; Landgrave of Austria; Landgrave of Styria; Landgrave of Carinthia; Landgrave of Carniola
- Dissolution: 1306; 720 years ago (Royal branch); 1521; 505 years ago (Opavian branch)
- Cadet branches: In order of seniority: Bretislian; Conradian: Znojmo (1035–1191); Brno (1035–1200); Olomouc (1045–1227); Děpoltian (1123–1247); Opavian (1255–1521)

The Přemyslid dynasty or House of Přemysl (Czech: Přemyslovci, German: Przemysliden, Polish: Przemyślidzi) was a Bohemian royal dynasty that reigned in the Duchy of Bohemia and later Kingdom of Bohemia and Margraviate of Moravia (9th century – 1306), as well as in parts of Poland (including Silesia), Hungary and Austria.

== Origin and rise ==
The dynasty's origin dates back to the 9th century, when the Přemyslids ruled a tiny territory around Prague, populated by a tribe of the Bohemians. Their name comes from the mythical ancestor figure of Přemysl the Ploughman. Gradually they expanded, conquering much of the region of Bohemia, located in the Bohemian basin where it was not threatened by the expansion of the Frankish Empire. The first historically-documented Přemyslid duke was Bořivoj I (867). DNA testing on the remains of his son, Spytihněv I, reveal the family's Y-haplogroup to be R1b, second most common haplogroup in Czech republic.

In the following century, the Přemyslids also ruled over Silesia and founded the city of Wrocław (Czech: Vratislav; German: Breslau), derived from the name of a Bohemian duke, Vratislaus I, father of Saint Wenceslaus. Under the reign of Prince Boleslaus I the Cruel (935) and his son Boleslaus II the Pious (972), the Přemyslids ruled territory stretching to today's Belarus.

The dynasty controlled vital trade routes during this time. The Bohemian lands and Prague were an important center of trade where merchants from all of Europe settled, including many Jews, as recalled in 965 by the Hispano-Jewish merchant and traveller Ibrahim ibn Ya'qub. He wrote, "Prague is a city from the stone, the richest of all states north of the Alps." After their rise to prominence, however, struggles within the family set in motion a decline in power and, in 1002, the Polish duke Boleslaus the Brave occupied Prague. Boleslaus III, son of Boleslaus II, escaped from Bohemia; decades of confusion and anarchy ensued.

The decline ended in the reign of Prince Bretislaus I, grandson of Boleslaus II. He in turn looted Poland, including the cities of Kraków and Gniezno (1038), where he obtained the relics of St. Adalbert. He sought the establishment of the Prague archbishopric and a royal title. His son and successor Vratislaus II became the first King of Bohemia in 1085.

Vratislaus' son Soběslav I destroyed the Imperial army of King Lothar III in the Battle of Chlumec in 1126. This allowed a further strengthening of Bohemia, culminating during the reign of Vratislaus's grandson, King Vladislaus II (1158). Vladislaus II founded many monasteries and built the first stone bridge across the Vltava river, one of the earliest in Central and Northern Europe. Once again, internal struggles started the decline of the Přemyslids. Many leaders from the dynasty alternated on the Bohemian throne, leading to their eventual bankruptcy. Finally, on his ascension to the throne, Ottokar I began a series of changes that brought Bohemia out of crisis, and began a period of success that lasted for nearly 220 years.

== At the height of its power ==
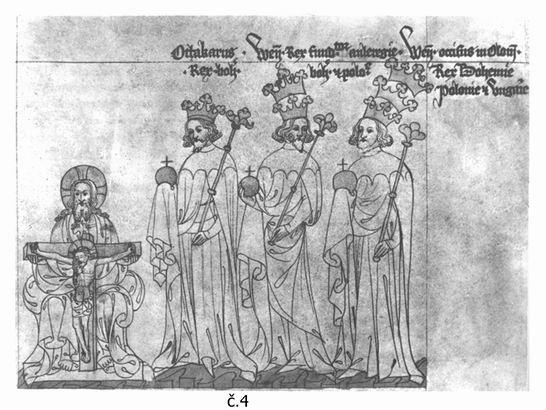
Last three Přemyslid kings according to illumination from the Chronicon Aulae regiae: Přemysl Ottokar II (one crown – Bohemia), Wenceslaus II (two crowns – Bohemia and Poland) and Wenceslaus III (three crowns – Hungary, Bohemia and Poland)

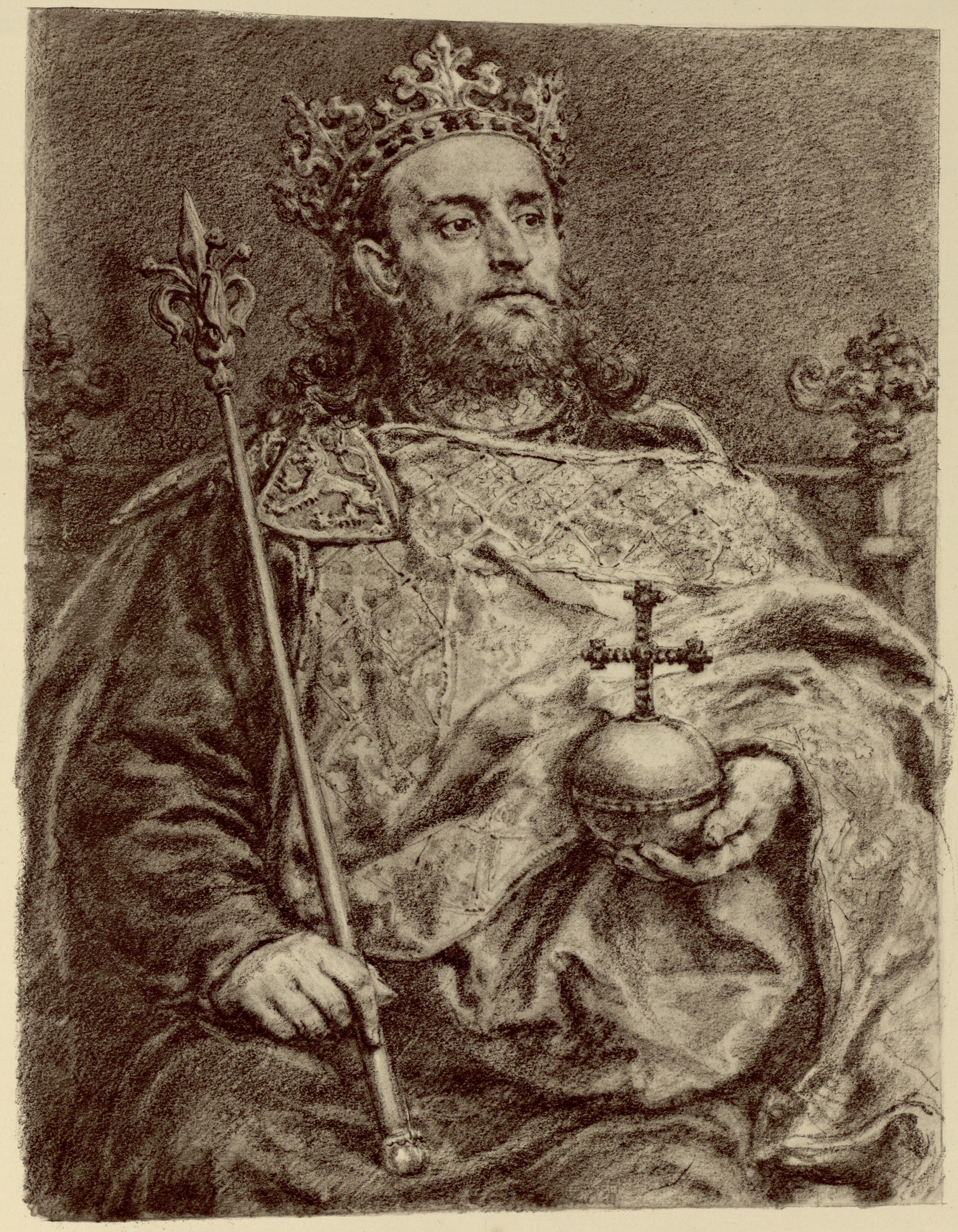
Bohemian king Wenceslaus II as the King of Poland, a romantic drawing by Jan Matejko (1892)

Ottokar I became the third King of Bohemia in the year 1198 but was the first King of Bohemia to acquire a hereditary royal title. This began significant growth of the Přemyslids' dynastic power. There was also a large urban and crafts development in Bohemia.

In the second half of the 13th century, the Přemyslids were one of the most powerful dynasties in Central Europe. King Přemysl Ottokar II, son of Wenceslas I, earned the nickname "Iron and Golden King" because of his military power and wealth. After several victorious wars with the Hungarian Kingdom, he acquired Austria, Styria, Carinthia and Carniola, extending Bohemian territory to the Adriatic Sea.

King Ottokar II aspired to the crown of the Holy Roman Empire. His ambitions started the conflict with the House of Habsburg, which had been composed of little-known counts, and suited the interests of German noble houses better than the mighty King Ottokar. The Habsburg representative, Rudolf, was elected as King of the Romans. In the Battle of Marchfeld (1278), Ottokar clashed with the Imperial and Hungarian armies, only to be killed. The Habsburgs then acquired Austria and retained it until the 20th century.

Ottokar's son King Wenceslaus II was just seven when he came to the throne of Bohemia. Over time, thanks to deft diplomacy, he gained the Polish crown for himself and the crown of Hungary for his son. Wenceslas II brought together a vast empire stretching from the Baltic Sea to the Danube River and established numerous cities, among them Plzeň in 1295. Bohemia became a wealthy nation during his reign thanks to a large vein of silver at Kutná Hora. He introduced the silver Prague groschen, which was an important unit of currency in Europe for centuries, and planned to build the first university in Central Europe.

The power and wealth of the Kingdom of Bohemia gave rise to great respect, but also to the hostility of other European royal families. The dynasty began to collapse following the untimely death of Wenceslaus II (1305), and the assassination of his only son, Wenceslaus III in 1306, which ended their rule.

On the distaff side, however, the dynasty continued, and in 1355, Bohemian king Charles IV, the grandson of Wenceslaus II, was crowned Holy Roman Emperor in Rome.

== Legendary rulers ==
The name of the dynasty, according to Cosmas in his Chronica Boemorum (1119), comes from its legendary founder, Přemysl, husband of duchess Libuše.

- Přemysl and Libuše
- Nezamysl
- Mnata
- Vojen
- Vnislav
- Křesomysl
- Neklan
- Hostivít

== Dukes of Bohemia ==
The first historical Přemyslid was Duke Bořivoj I, baptised in 874 by Saint Methodius. In 895, Bohemia gained independence from Great Moravia. Between 1003 and 1004, Bohemia was controlled by Boleslaus the Brave, Duke of Poland from the Piast dynasty, grandson of Boleslaus I the Cruel.

In 1085, Duke Vratislaus II, and, in 1158, Duke Vladislaus II, were crowned King of Bohemia as a personal award from the Holy Roman Emperor. The title, however, was not hereditary.

- Bořivoj I (c. 870–889)
- Spytihněv I (895–915)
- Vratislaus I (915–921)
- Wenceslaus I (St. Wenceslaus) (921–935)
- Boleslaus I the Cruel (935–972)
- Boleslaus II the Pious (972–999)
- Boleslaus III the Red-haired (999–1002)
- Vladivoj (1002–1003)
- Boleslaus IV (1003–1004)
- Jaromír (1004–1012)
- Udalrich I (1012–1033)
- Jaromír (1033–1034)
- Udalrich I (1034)
- Bretislaus I (1035–1055)
- Spytihněv II (1055–1061)
- Vratislaus II (1061–1092), king (1085–1092) as Vratislaus I.
- Conrad I of Brno (1092)
- Bretislaus II (1092–1100)
- Bořivoj II (1101–1107)
- Svatopluk (1107–1109)
- Vladislaus I (1109–1117)
- Bořivoj II (1117–1120)
- Vladislaus I (1120–1125)
- Soběslav I (1125–1140)
- Vladislaus II (1140–1172), king (1158–1172) as Vladislaus I
- Frederick I (1172–1173)
- Udalrich II (1173), nominated by the Emperor but renounce
- Soběslav II (1173–1178)
- Frederick I (1178–1189)
- Conrad II Otto (1189–1191)
- Wenceslaus II (1191–1192)
- Ottokar I (1192–1193)
- Bretislaus III Henry (1193–1197)
- Vladislaus III Henry (1197)
- Ottokar I (1197–1198)

== Kings of Bohemia ==
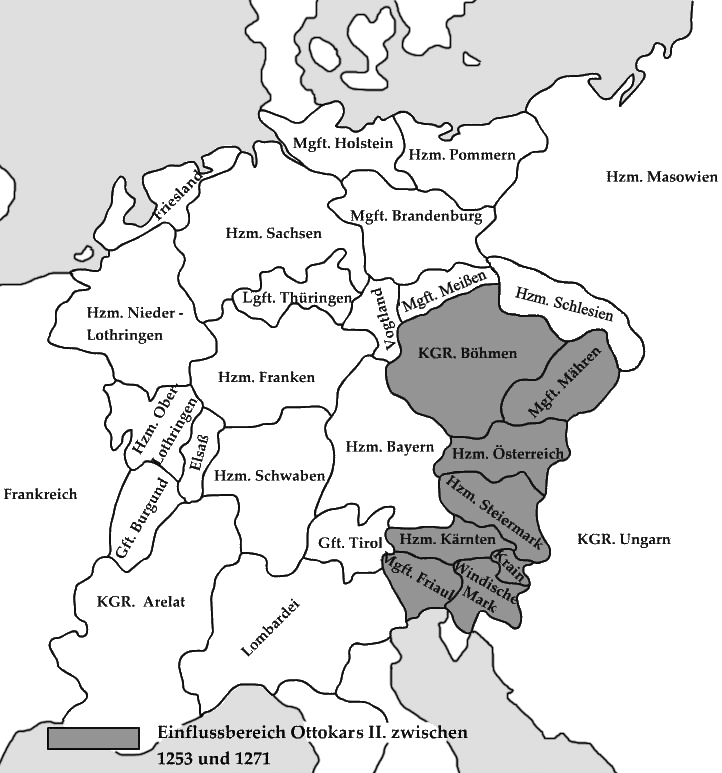
Maximum extent of the kingdom under Ottokar II, c. 1276

Bohemia was the only princedom in the Holy Roman Empire which was raised to the status of kingdom prior to the Napoleonic Wars. The reason for this was strength: as soon as Bohemia overcame its civil strife, the Bohemian duke became the principal ally for any candidate for the Imperial throne. The emperor could thus use Bohemian forces to punish any rebels who were Bohemian neighbours simply by raiding their lands. This is evinced by the Holy Roman Emperor Henry IV naming Prince Vratislaus II of Bohemia the first king of Bohemia, Vratislaus I, in 1085. He was raised to this prominent position not long after his father Bretislaus pacified Bohemia after years of civil conflict. The kingship was disputed whenever Bohemian internal conflict increased. It was fixed, however, after the position of the emperor in Germany weakened.

In 1198, Duke Ottokar I again gained the title of King of Bohemia as an ally of Philip of Swabia. This title was reconfirmed by Otto IV, Holy Roman Emperor and later on in Frederick II, Holy Roman Emperor's Golden Bull of Sicily (1212).

- Ottokar I (Czech Přemysl Otakar I.) (1198–1230)
- Wenceslaus I (Czech Václav I.) (1230–1253)
- Ottokar II (Czech Přemysl Otakar II.) (1253–1278)
- Wenceslaus II (Czech Václav II.) (1278–1305)
- Wenceslaus III (Czech Václav III.) (1305–1306)

== Kings of Bohemia, Poland and Hungary, rulers of Austria ==
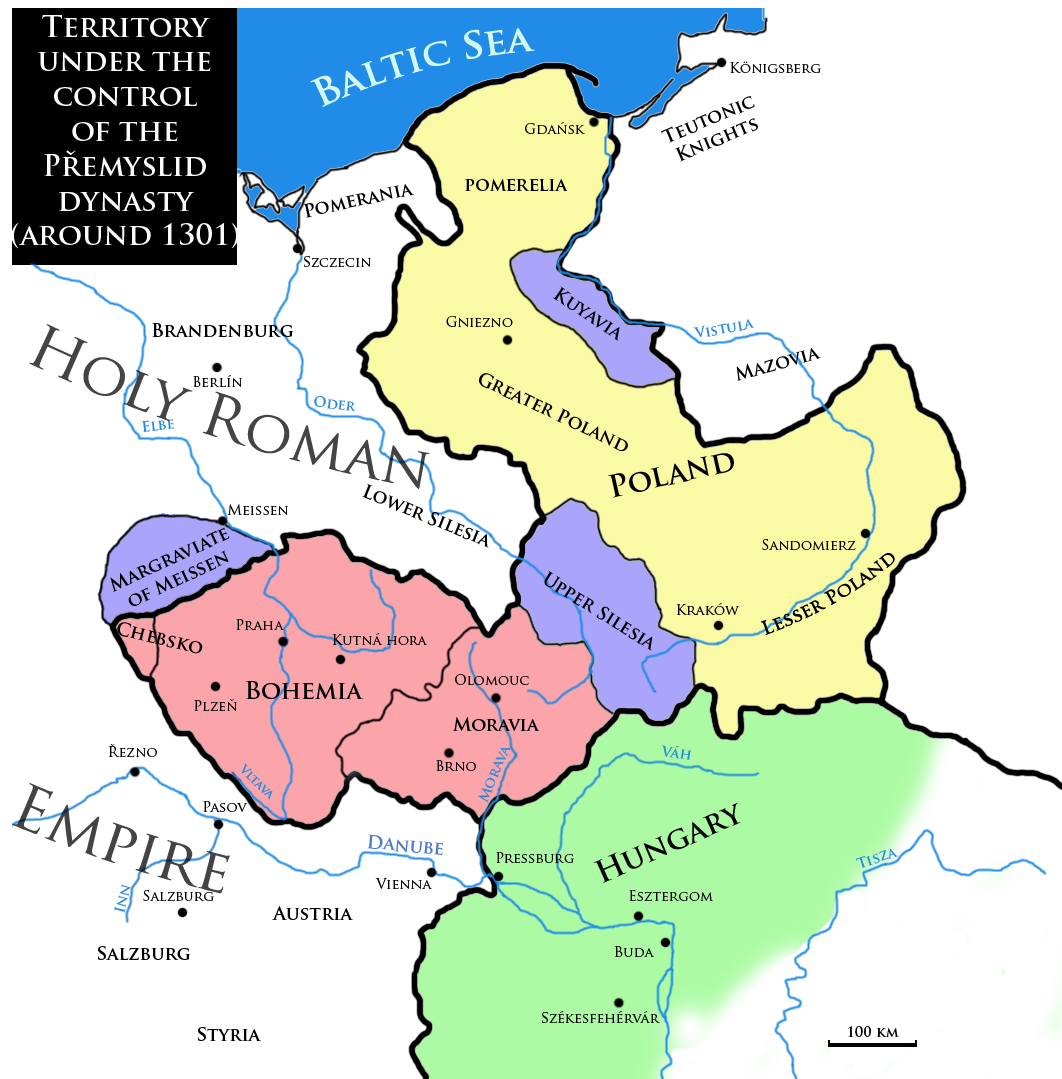
Territory under the control of the Přemyslids, c. 1301: Kingdom of Bohemia Kingdom of Poland Probable extent of territory under control of Wenceslaus III in Hungary Vassals

In 1269–1276, King Ottokar II of Bohemia was the first in history to rule the lands of today's Austria together (except for Tyrol and Salzburg). He also founded the Hofburg Palace in Vienna.

In 1300, King Wenceslaus II was crowned King of Poland. Prior to this, he held the title "High Duke of Poland (Duke of Kraków)" since 1291 and became its overlord upon the death of Przemysł II of Poland in 1296.

- Wenceslaus II (1300–1305)
- Wenceslaus III (1305–1306), also King of Hungary (1301–1305) as Vencel

The royal line ended in 1306 with the death of King Wenceslaus III. The Bohemian throne went to the Luxembourgs, and the Polish throne returned to the Piasts.

== Dukes of Opava, Krnov, Ratibor and Münsterberg ==
In 1269, Nicholas, bastard son of King Ottokar II who was legitimized by Pope Alexander IV in 1260, became Duke of Opava. In 1337, his son Nicholas II inherited the Duchy of Ratibor. His four sons divided the Duchy of Opava (the Duchy of Ratibor was inherited only by the eldest, John). Thus started the partition of a once-unified land between the descendants of Nicholas II. In 1443, William, Duke of Opava gained the Duchy of Münsterberg, which was held by Přemyslids until 1456. This line of Opavian Přemyslids ended in 1521, with the death of Valentine, Duke of Ratibor.

== Family tree ==
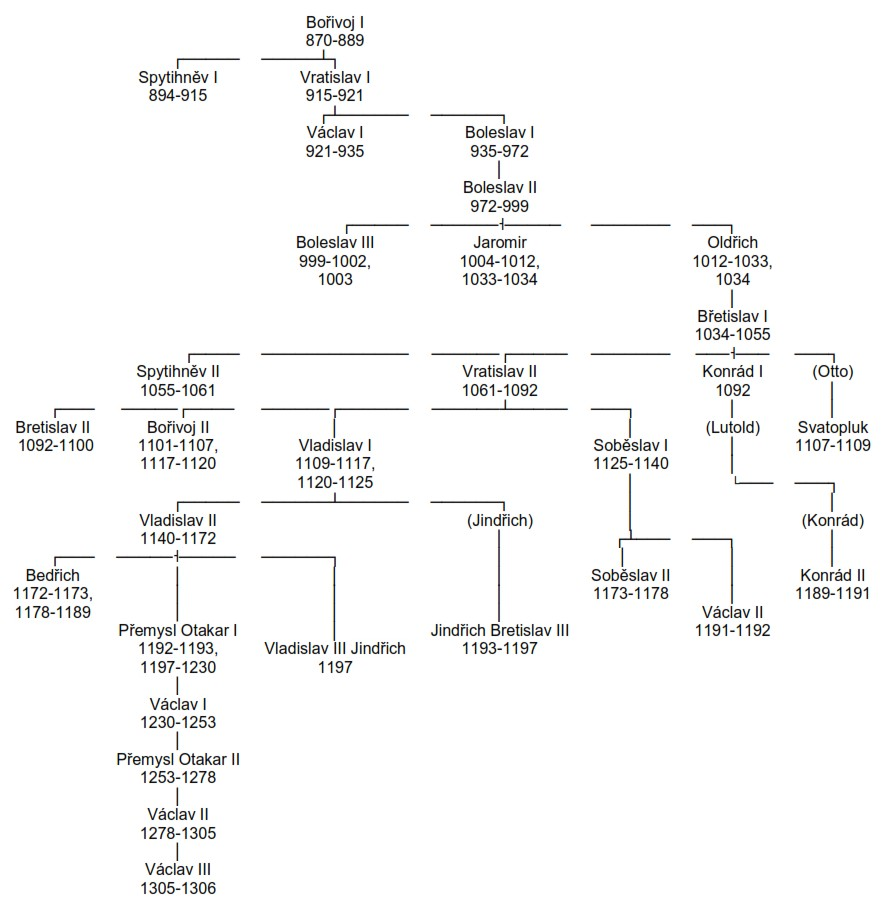
Premyslid Dynasty Family Tree

Bořivoj I. + Saint Ludmila

- Spytihněv I
- Vratislav I
  - Saint Václav I
  - Boleslav I the Cruel
    - Boleslav II the Pious
      - Boleslav III the Red-haired
      - Jaromír the Eunuch
      - Václav the Infantdead
      - Oldřich
        - Břetislav I Achilles (Duke of Bohemia and Moravia, earlier Duke of Moravia - Bretislian)
          - Spytihněv II
          - Vratislav II
            - Břetislav II
            - Judith of Bohemia, mother of Boleslaus III of Poland
            - Bořivoj II
            - Vladislav I
              - Vladislav II
                - Bedřich
                - Ottokar I
                  - Wenceslas I
                    - Ottokar II the Golden and Iron
                      - Wenceslas II
                        - Wenceslas III d. 1306 as last male member of the royal Přemyslid dynasty
                        - Anne of Bohemia (1290–1313)
                        - Elisabeth of Bohemia (1292–1330) last member of the royal Přemyslid dynasty
                    - Nicholas I of Opavia started line of Dukes of Opava; died out in 1521
                  - Vladislaus II of Moravia (Ottonian)
                  - Queen Dagmar of Denmark, mother of Valdemar the Young
                - Vladislav III Henry
              - Henry
                - Břetislav III Henry (Henry Bretislav)
            - Soběslav I
              - Soběslav II. the Peasant
              - Wenceslas II
          - Bishop Jaromír
          - Konrád I of Brno and Znojmo (Conradian)
            - Konrád of Brno (Conradian, earlier Duke of Moravia)
            - Litolt of Znojmo (Conradian, earlier Duke of Moravia)
              - Oldřich of Brno (Conradian, Duke of Moravia, part of Brno)
              - Konrád of Znojmo (Conradian, earlier Duke of Moravia)
                - Konrád II Ota of Brno and Znojmo (Conradian)
          - Otto of Olomouc
            - Otto II the Black
            - Svatopluk
    - Abbess Mlada
    - Dobrava m. Mieszko I of Poland, ancestors of piast line in Poland, which includes Boleslaw III above
    - Strachkvas Christian

== Family tree of Elisabeth of Bohemia and Jagiellonians and Habsburgs ==
- Charles IV, Holy Roman Emperor and king of Bohemia
  - Wenceslaus, King of the Romans and king of Bohemia
  - Sigismund, Holy Roman Emperor King of Hungary and Bohemia
    - Elisabeth of Luxemburg Queen of Hungary, Germany and Bohemia
      - Ladislaus the Posthumous King of Hungary and Bohemia, Archduke of Austria
      - Elisabeth of Austria Queen of Poland
        - King Vladislas II of Bohemia and Hungary
          - King Louis II of Hungary and of Bohemia
          - Princess and Queen Anna of Bohemia and Hungary + Ferdinand I, Holy Roman Emperor and King of Hungary and Bohemia
            - Maxmilian II
              - Rudolph II
              - Matthias
            - Charles of Steiermark
              - Ferdinand II
                - Ferdinand III
                  - Ferdinand IV
                  - Leopold I
                    - Joseph I
                      - Marie Amalia + Charles III of Bavaria
                    - Charles II
                      - Maria Theresa
                        - Joseph II
                        - Leopold II
                          - Francis I
                            - Ferdinand V
                            - Francis Charles
                              - Francis II Joseph
                              - Emperor Maxmilian
                              - Charles Louis
                                - Francis Ferdinand d'Este
                                - Otto
                                  - Charles IV
                                    - Otto von Habsburg
                                      - Karl von Habsburg
  - John of Zgorzelec
    - Elisabeth, Duchess of Luxembourg
- John Henry
  - Emperor Jost of Moravia

== See also ==
- List of rulers of Bohemia
- Kingdom of Bohemia
- List of Polish rulers
- List of rulers of Hungary
- Slavník dynasty
