= Chronica Boemorum =

Chronicle of the Czech lands

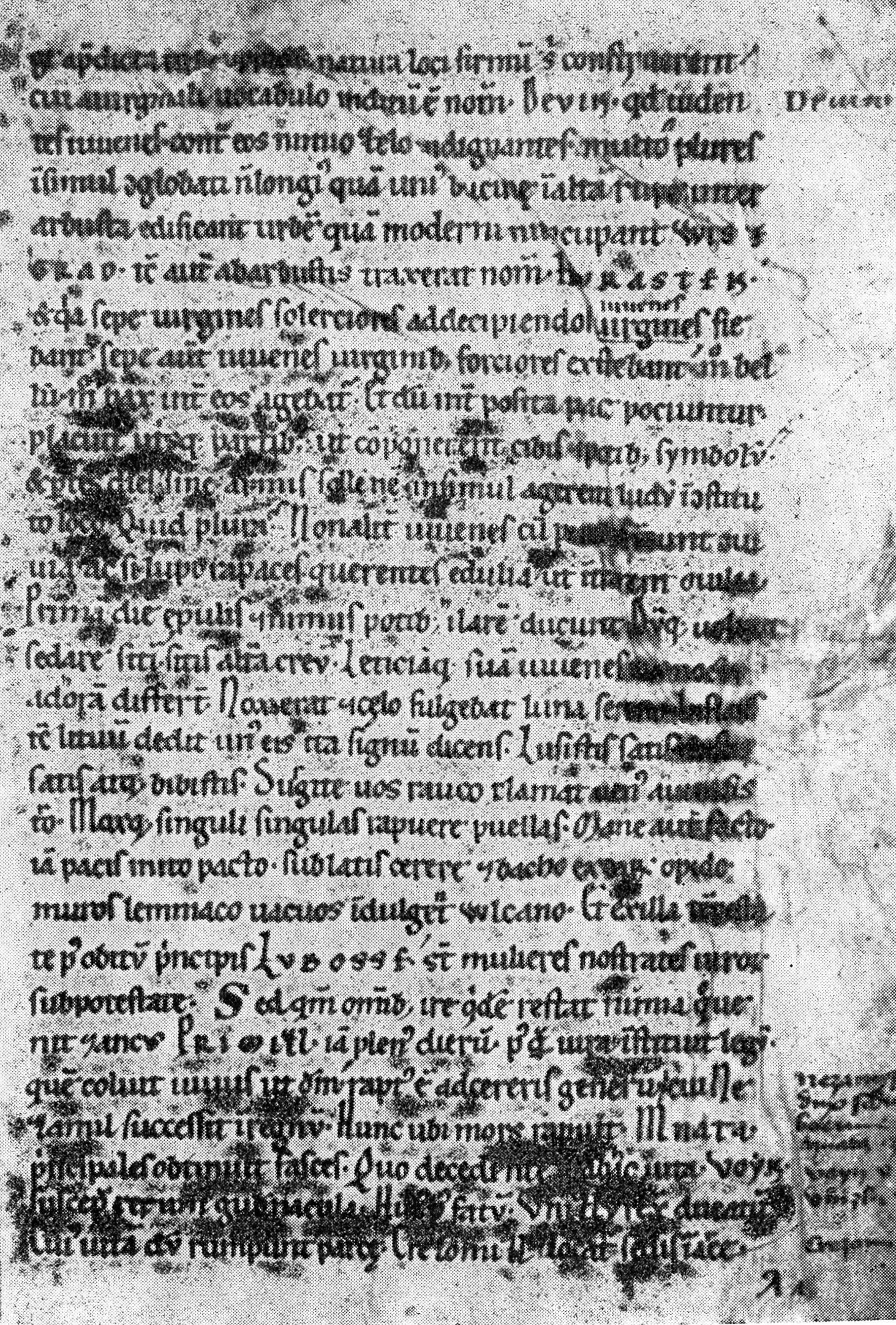
Page of manuscript of Chronica Boemorum. Near the bottom of the page are the names of seven legendary dukes, who came after Přemysl the Ploughman.

The Chronica Boemorum (Chronicle of the Czechs, or Bohemians) is the first Latin chronicle in which the history of the Czech lands has been consistently and relatively fully described. It was written in 1119–1125 by Cosmas of Prague.

The manuscript includes information about historical events in Czech land from ancient times to the first quarter of the 12th century. At the same time, the Chronicle is not limited to Czech national historiography, also revealing the relationship between various European states during the 10th–12th centuries.

The author of the chronicle had been known as the dean of the chapter of St. Vitus Cathedral in Prague Cosmas of Prague. Being a valuable historical source, especially as it relates to events whose contemporary was Cosmas, the Czech Chronicle in many respects set the direction for the subsequent development of the Czech annals. The chronicler worked on the chronicle until his death in 1125. Despite some inaccuracies and a vivid expression of the author's own position, the scientific level is high for that era and the importance of the events described in it put Cosmas of Prague into one of the most significant chroniclers of medieval Europe.

The Chronica was continued by various, collectively called Cosmas's continuators, down to 1300.

== Sources ==
- Bak, János M.; Rychterová, Pavlína, eds. (2020). Cosmae Pragensis Chronica Bohemorum: Cosmas of Prague, The Chronicle of the Czechs. Budapest-New York: Central European University Press.
- Bretholz, Bertold, ed. (1923). Die Chronik der Böhmen des Cosmas von Prag. Berlin: Weidmannsche Buchhandlung.
- Hasil, Jan; Rensvoude, Irene (2020). "Introduction". Cosmae Pragensis Chronica Bohemorum: Cosmas of Prague, The Chronicle of the Czechs. Budapest-New York: Central European University Press. pp. XV–LIX.
- Havlíková, Lubomíra (2016). "What was the location of Serbia mentioned in the Cosmas Chronicle of the Czechs?". Споменица др тибора Живковића: Homage to Tibor Živković. Београд: Историјски институт. pp. 185–191.
- Wolverton, Lisa, ed. (2009). Cosmas of Prague: The Chronicle of the Czechs. Washington: Catholic University of America Press.
