= Cosmas of Prague =

Czech priest (c. 1045–1125)

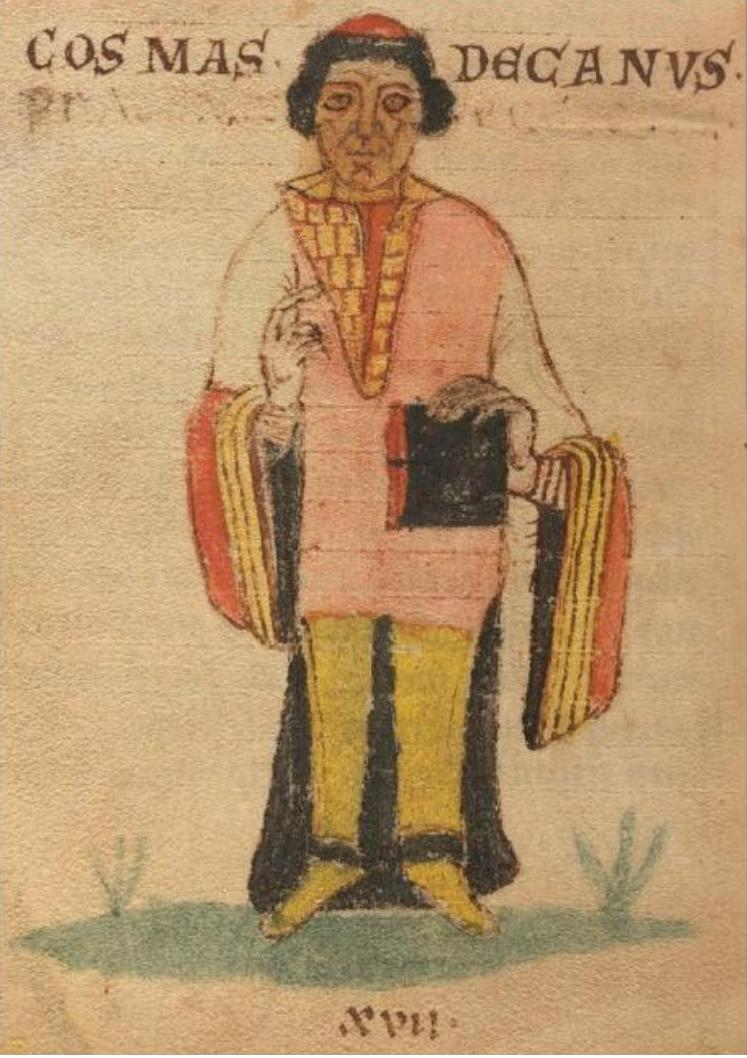
Miniature depicting Cosmas, from Lipský rukopis, an early ms. of Chronica Boemorum

Cosmas of Prague (Czech: Kosmas Pražský; Latin: Cosmas Decanus; c. 1045 – 21 October 1125) was a Czech priest, writer and historian.

== Life ==
Between 1075 and 1081, he studied in Liège. After his return to Bohemia, he married Božetěcha with whom he had a son, named Jindřich Zdík, and remained in minor orders. His son later became Bishop of Olomouc. In 1094, he was ordained a deacon, and in 1099, he was ordained a priest at Esztergom, Hungary.

== Works ==
His magnum opus, written in Latin, is called Chronica Boemorum.

The Chronica is divided into three books:

- The first book, completed in 1119, starts with the creation of the world and ends in the year 1038. It describes the legendary foundation of the Bohemian state by the oldest Bohemians around the year 600 (Duke Czech, Duke Krok and his three daughters), Duchess Libuše and the foundation of Přemyslid dynasty by her marriage with Přemysl, old bloody wars, Duke Bořivoj and the introduction of Christianity in Bohemia, Saint Wenceslaus and his grandmother Saint Ludmila, reign of the three Boleslavs, the life of Saint Adalbert and bloody wars after year 1000.
- The second book describes Bohemian history for the years 1038–1092. The book starts with the heroic deeds of Duke Břetislav, known as the "Bohemian Achilles", for example with his victory over Poland. The Chronica also describes the long and great reign of King Vratislav, who was known as a forceful ruler but a brave and good man. There is also a reflection on his wars in Italy; this book ends with Vratislav's death.
- The third book (1092–1125) starts with a description of the time of instability and bloody civil wars after Vratislav's death between years 1092 and 1109. The Chronica ends with the reign of Vladislav between 1109 and 1125. The same year, 1125, Cosmas died.

In the later 12th and 13th centuries, Cosmas's continuators brought his history down to 1283.

== Sources ==
- Bak, János M.; Rychterová, Pavlína, eds. (2020). Cosmae Pragensis Chronica Bohemorum: Cosmas of Prague, The Chronicle of the Czechs. Budapest-New York: Central European University Press.
- Bretholz, Bertold, ed. (1923). Die Chronik der Böhmen des Cosmas von Prag. Berlin: Weidmannsche Buchhandlung.
- Hasil, Jan; Rensvoude, Irene (2020). "Introduction". Cosmae Pragensis Chronica Bohemorum: Cosmas of Prague, The Chronicle of the Czechs. Budapest-New York: Central European University Press. pp. XV–LIX.
- Havlíková, Lubomíra (2016). "What was the location of Serbia mentioned in the Cosmas Chronicle of the Czechs?". Споменица др тибора Живковића: Homage to Tibor Živković. Београд: Историјски институт. pp. 185–191.
- Wolverton, Lisa, ed. (2009). Cosmas of Prague: The Chronicle of the Czechs. Washington: Catholic University of America Press.
