= Bořivoj =

Bořivoj is a Czech masculine given name. It is derived from the old Slavic words boriti ('to fight') and voj ('army'). The name therefore means "fighter" or "one who leads an army into battle". A shortened form of the name is Bořek. Notable people with the name include:

- Bořivoj I, Duke of Bohemia (c. 852 – c. 889)
- Bořivoj II, Duke of Bohemia (c. 1064 – 1124)
- Bořivoj Čelovský (1923–2008), Czech-Canadian historian
- Bořivoj Zeman (1912–1991), Czech film director and screenwriter
