= Záviš Kalandra =

Czechoslovak historian, theatre critic, and theorist of literature (1902–1950)

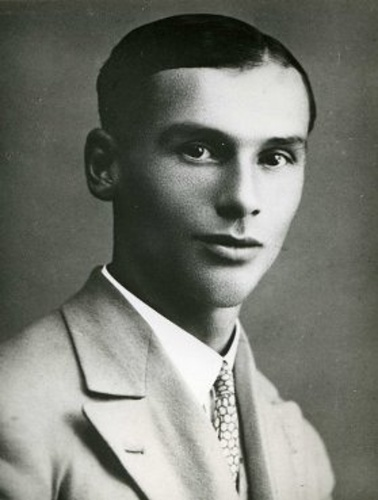
- Born: 10 November 1902; Frenštát pod Radhoštěm, Austria-Hungary
- Died: 27 June 1950 (aged 47); Prague, Czechoslovakia
- Education: Charles University
- Occupations: Historian, journalist, politician, writer, theater critic and film critic
- Political party: Communist Party of Czechoslovakia

Záviš Kalandra (10 November 1902 – 27 June 1950) was a Czechoslovak historian, theatre critic and theorist of literature.

He was born in Frenštát pod Radhoštěm. He studied philosophy at the Charles University in Prague and then in Berlin. In 1923 he joined the Communist Party of Czechoslovakia, but he was expelled after criticizing the Moscow Trials of 1936.

He was arrested by the Gestapo in 1939 and imprisoned until 1945 in various concentration camps. After the war he was branded as a Trotskyist and accused of being a member of a supposed plot to overthrow the Communist regime. He was sentenced to death along with his co-defendants, Milada Horáková, Jan Buchal and Oldřich Pecl, on 8 June 1950, and executed by hanging.
