= František Palacký =

Czech historian and politician (1798–1876)

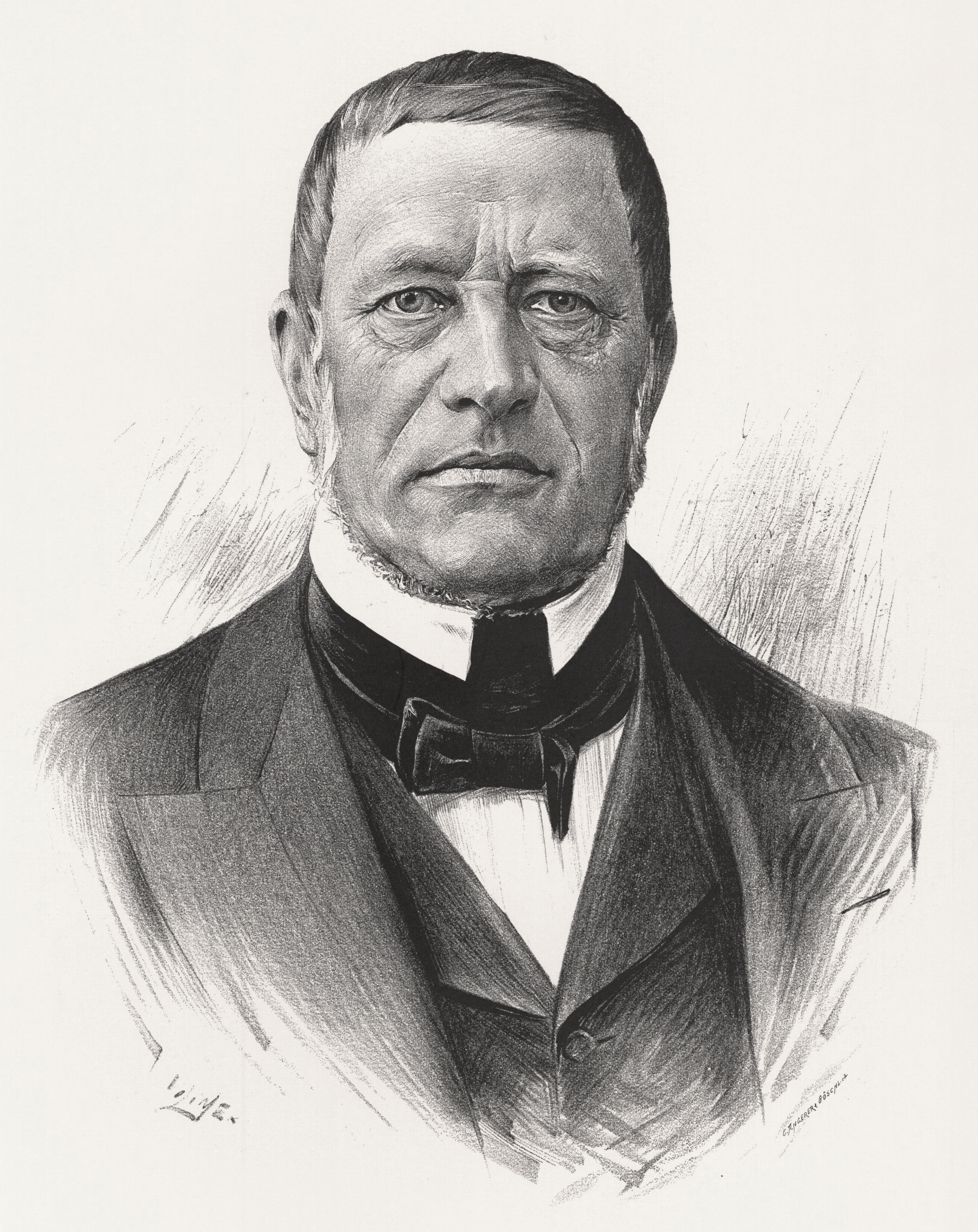
- Portrait of Palacký by Jan Vilímek

MP of Bohemian provincial diet
- In office 1861–1876

MP of Imperial Diet
- In office 1848–1849

Personal details
- Born: 14 June 1798 Hodslavice, Moravia
- Died: 26 May 1876 (aged 77) Prague, Austria-Hungary
- Party: Old Czech Party
- Spouse: Terezie Měchurová
- Children: Jan Křtitel Kašpar Palacký; Marie Riegrová-Palacká
- Profession: Politician, historian

František Palacký (Czech pronunciation: [ˈfraɲcɪʃɛk ˈpalatskiː]; 14 June 1798 – 26 May 1876) was a Czech historian and politician. He was the most influential person of the Czech National Revival, called "Father of the Nation".

== Life ==
František Palacký was born on 14 June 1798, at Hodslavice house 108, a northeastern Moravian village now part of the Moravian-Silesian Region of the Czech Republic. His ancestors had been members of the community of the Bohemian Brethren, and had clandestinely maintained their Protestant belief throughout the period of religious persecution, eventually giving their adherence to the Augsburg confession as approximate to their original faith. Palacký's father was a schoolmaster and a man of some learning. The son was sent in 1812 to the Evangelic Lutheran Lyceum at the then-Hungarian city of Bratislava, where he came in contact with the philologist Pavel J. Šafařík and became a zealous student of Slavic languages (he mastered 11 languages and became familiar with a few others).

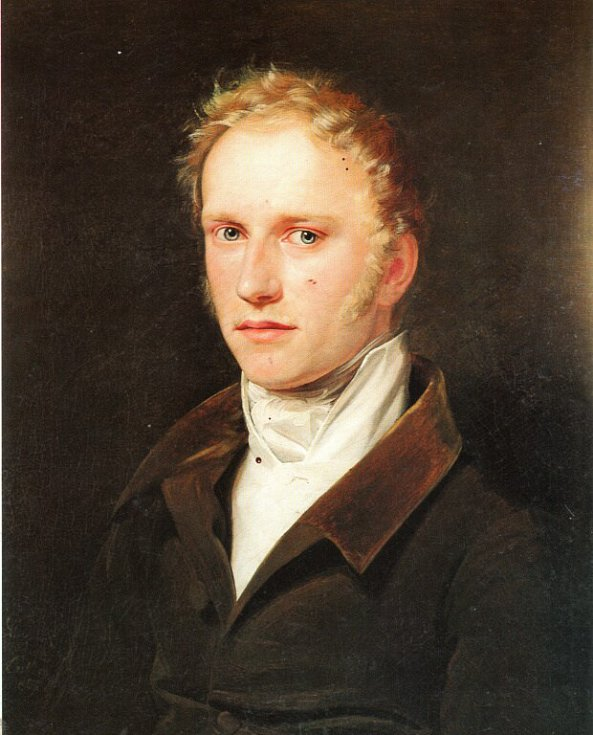
Palacký in 1821 in Vienna, painting by František Tkadlík

After some years spent in private teaching, Palacký settled in 1823 at Prague. Here he found a warm friend in Josef Dobrovský, whose good relations with the Austrian authorities shielded him from the hostility shown by the government to students of Slav subjects. Dobrovský introduced him to Count Sternberg and his brother Francis, both of whom took an enthusiastic interest in Bohemian history. Count Francis was the principal founder of the Society of the Bohemian Museum, devoted to the collection of documents bearing on Bohemian history, with the object of reawakening national sentiment by the study of the national records.

=== Joining of Czech national movement ===
Public interest in the movement was stimulated in 1825 by the new Časopis Českého musea (Journal of the Bohemian Museum), of which Palacký was the first editor. The journal was at first published in Czech and German, and the Czech edition survived to become the most important literary organ of Bohemia. Palacký had received a modest appointment as archivist to Count Sternberg and in 1829 the Bohemian estates sought to confer on him the title of historiographer of Bohemia, with a small salary, but it was ten years before the consent of the Viennese authorities was obtained.

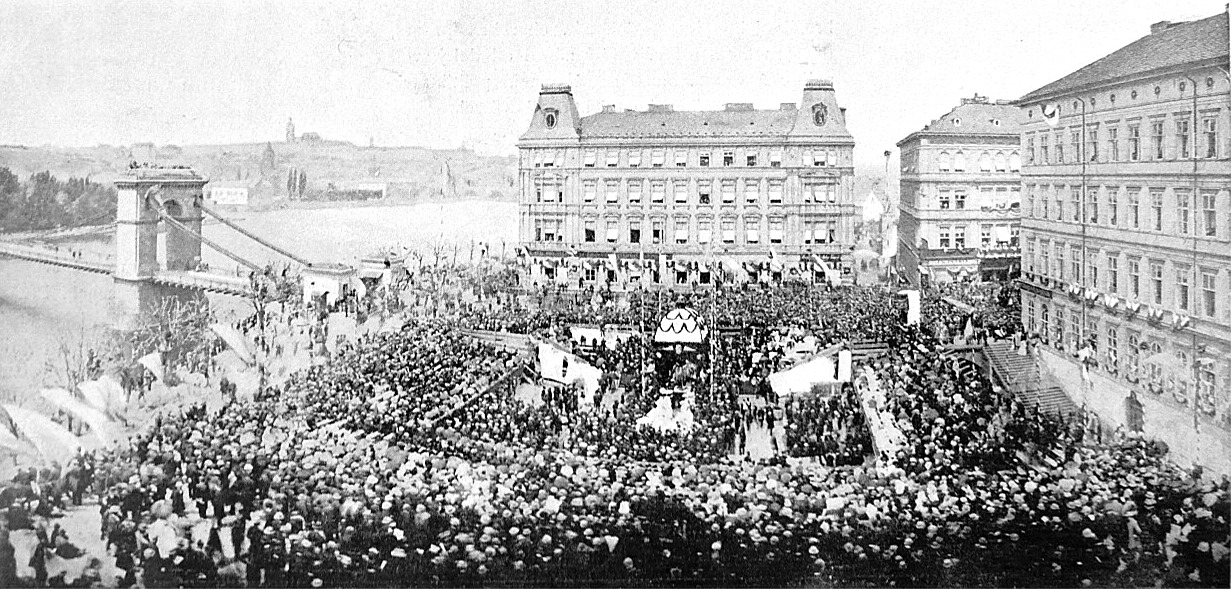
Laying the foundation stone of National Theatre in Prague, 16 May 1868

Meanwhile, the estates, with the tardy assent of Vienna, had undertaken to pay the expenses of publishing Palacký's capital work, Dějiny národu českého v Čechách a v Moravě (History of the Czech Nation in Bohemia and Moravia). This book, which covers the period up to 1526 and the extinction of Czech independence (Palacký admitted that in writing about the national history since 1526, he "would have to lie"), was founded on laborious research in the local archives of Bohemia and in the libraries of the chief cities of Europe, and remains the standard authority. The first volume was printed in German in 1836, and subsequently translated into Czech. The publication of the work was hindered by the police censorship, which was especially active in criticizing his account of the Hussite movement.

Palacký, though entirely national and Protestant in his sympathies, was careful to avoid an uncritical approbation of the Reformers' methods, but his statements were held by the authorities to be dangerous to the Catholic faith. He was compelled to cut out parts of his narrative and to accept as integral parts of his work passages interpolated by the censors. After the abolition of the police censorship in 1848 he published a new edition, completed in 1876, restoring the original form of the work. The fairest and most considerable of Palacký's antagonists in the controversy aroused by his narrative of the early reformation in Bohemia was Baron Helfert, who received a brief from Vienna to write his Huss und Hieronymus (1853) to counteract the impression made by Palacký's History. Konstantin von Höfler, a German professor of history at Prague, edited the historical authorities for the period in a similar sense in his Geschichte der hussitischen Bewegung in Bohmen. Palacký replied in his Geschichte des Hussitenthumes und Professor Löffler (Prague, 1868) and Zur böhmischen Geschichtschreibung (Prague, 1871).

=== Political activism ===
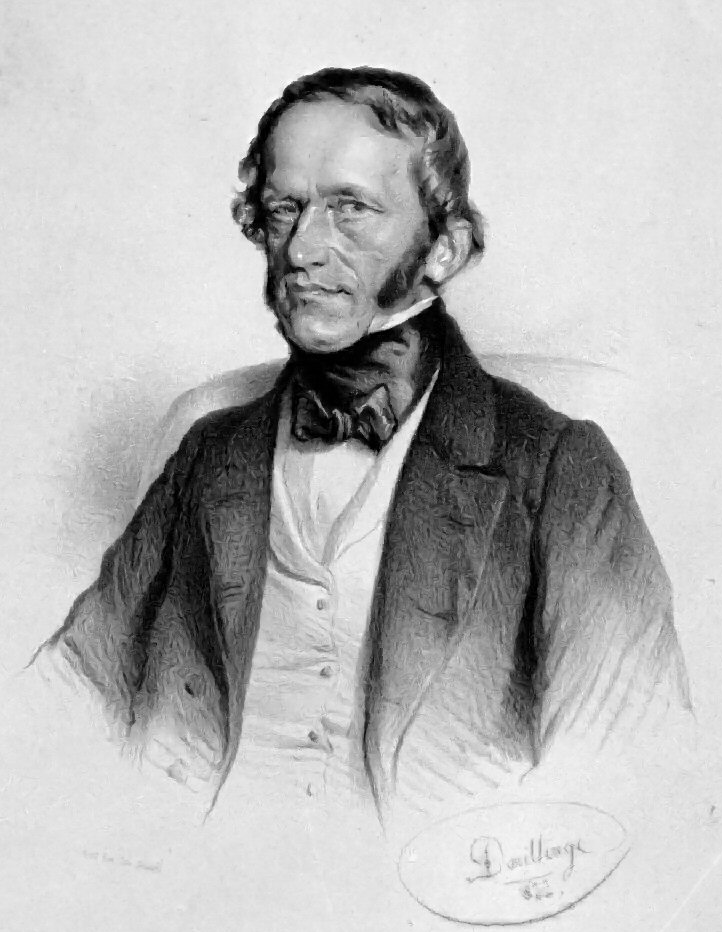
František Palacký (lithography, 1855)

The Revolution of 1848 forced the historian into practical politics. In his famous Psaní do Frankfurtu (A Letter to Frankfurt) he refused to take part in the preliminary parliament consisting of 500 former deputies to the all-German Diet, which met at Frankfurt, on the grounds that as a Czech he had no interest in German affairs. In early June he oversaw the Slavic Congress at Prague as its president. Later that year he was deputed to the Reichstag which sat at the town of Kroměříž (Kremsier) between October 1848 and March 1849. He was at this time in favour of a strong Austrian empire, which should consist of a federation of the southern German and the Slavonic states, allowing the retention of their individual rights. This movement was called Austroslavism. Its views met with some degree of consideration at Vienna, and Palacký was even offered a portfolio in the Pillersdorf cabinet. The collapse of the federal idea and the definite triumph of the party of reaction in 1852 led to his retirement from politics.

After the liberal concessions of 1860 and 1861, however, he became a life member of the Austrian senate. His views met with small support from the assembly, and with the exception of a short period after the decree of September 1871, by which the emperor raised hopes for Bohemian self-government, he ceased to appear in the senate from 1861 onwards. In the Bohemian Diet (zemský sněm) he became the acknowledged leader of the nationalist-federal party (staročeši). He sought the establishment of a Czech kingdom that should include Bohemia, Moravia and Silesia, and in his zeal for Czech autonomy he even entered into an alliance with the Conservative nobility and with the extreme Catholics. He attended the Panslavist congress in Moscow in 1867. He died in Prague on 26 May 1876.

== Legacy ==
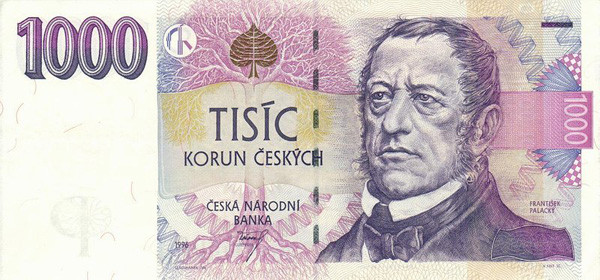
Portrait of Palacký on a Czech koruna banknote

Palacký is considered as one of the three Fathers of the nation – the first being the King of Bohemia and Holy Roman Emperor Charles IV, the second is František Palacký and the third is President of Czechoslovakia Tomáš Garrigue Masaryk. Various individuals like to emphasize one over the other. As to historians, none have surpassed his history of Bohemia except when they have focused on a narrower time period. Even these have been directly or indirectly influenced by his work. He has also been the subject of Czechoslovak philosophical analysis by the likes of Milan Machovec (in his 1961 monograph).

== Honours ==
- Knight of the Order of the Iron Crown, Second Class, 27 October 1862

== Works ==
=== Poetry ===
- Na horu Radhošť – poem
- Má modlitba dne 26. července 1818 – hymnus
- Ideál říše – ode from year 1920

=== Other works ===
- Würdigung der alten böhmischen Geschichtschreiber (Prague, 1830), dealing with authors of many of whose works were then inaccessible to Czech students
- Dějiny národu českého v Čechách a v Moravě I–V (History of the Czech Nation in Bohemia and Moravia), 1836–1867
- Archiv český (6 vols., Prague, 1840–1872)
- Urkundliche Beiträge zur Geschichte des Hussitenkriegs (2 vols., Prague, 1872–1874)
- Documenta magistri Johannis Hus vitam, doctrinam, causant ... illustrantia (Prague, 1869)
- with Šafařík he wrote Anfänge der böhmischen Dichtkunst (Pressburg, 1818) and Die ältesten Denkmäler der böhmischen Sprache (Prague, 1840)
- Three volumes of his Czech articles and essays were published as Radhost (3 vols., Prague, 1871–1873)

== See also ==
- František Ladislav Rieger
- Tomáš Garrigue Masaryk
- Palacký University, Olomouc
