= Vladimír Karbusický =

Czech musicologist

Vladimír Karbusický (9 April 1925, in Velim – 23 May 2002, in Hamburg) was a Czech musicologist and folklorist.

During World War II, he was abducted by the Germans for forced labor in Hamburg. After returning to Prague, he worked for the Ethnographic Institute of the Czechoslovak Academy of Sciences. He collected Jewish jokes, but was prevented from publishing them due to their often anti-authoritarian qualities which threatened the Czechoslovak Communist Party. After emigrating to West Germany in 1969, he published a book, Jewish Anecdotes from Prague, in which he collected jokes about Prague's Jewish population, which had nearly been wiped out during the Holocaust.
