= Annales Fuldenses =

Medieval Frankish chronicle

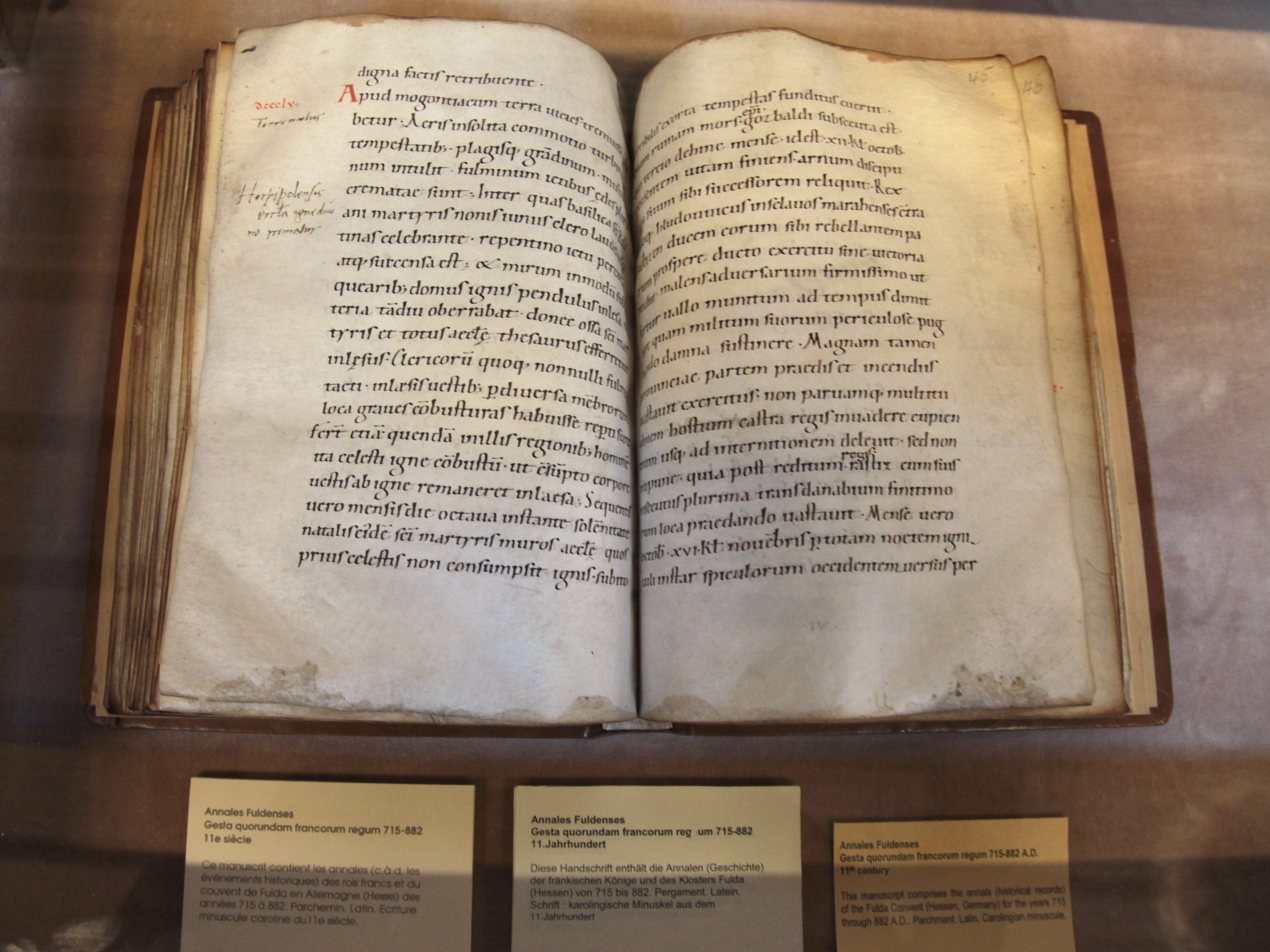
11th century Carolingian minuscule copy of the Annales Fuldenses kept in the Humanist Library of Sélestat. Entry for the year 855: Earthquake at Mainz

The Annales Fuldenses or Annals of Fulda are East Frankish chronicles that cover independently the period from the last years of Louis the Pious (died 840) to shortly after the end of effective Carolingian rule in East Francia with the accession of the child-king, Louis III, in 900. Throughout this period they are a near contemporary record of the events they describe and a primary source for Carolingian historiography. They are usually read as a counterpart to the narrative found in the West Frankish Annales Bertiniani.

== Authorship and manuscripts ==
The Annals were composed at the Abbey of Fulda in Hesse. A note in one manuscript has been taken to prove that the entries down to 838 were composed by Einhard (Enhard in the MS), yet it has been convincingly argued that this might only have been a copyist's colophon that has abusively entered the manuscript tradition, a sort of accident far from uncommon in medieval scriptoria. Be that as it may, a second note sets on more solid grounds the attribution of the annals down to 864 to Rudolf of Fulda, whose manuscript, though not conserved, is mentioned in independent sources and has left traces in the tradition. Some scholars believe that the whole work was first put together by an unknown compiler only in the 870s. It has also been suggested that they were continued after 864 by Meinhard, but very little is known of this continuator of Rudolf's work. However, already after 863 the three (Kurze) or two (Hellman) manuscript groups of the Annals break off into different overlapping versions, continuing Rudolf's work down to 882 (or 887) and 896 (or 901). The two alleged principal extensions have been styled the "Mainz" and "Bavarian" continuations respectively. The Mainz version shows strong links with the circle of Liutbert, Archbishop of Mainz, and is written from a Franconian perspective and are partisan to Liutbert and the kings he served. The Bavarian continuation was probably written in Regensburg until 896 and thereafter in Niederalteich. A new edition is eagerly awaited.

== Sources ==
The years 714 to 830 are largely based on the Royal Frankish Annals (741–829) and the Annals of Lorsch (703–803, including continuations). After that date the Annals of Fulda are relatively independent.

== Content ==
The events recorded in the annals include the death of Louis the Pious and the subsequent dividing of the Frankish Empire into three parts at the Treaty of Verdun. After 860, the annals focus mainly on events in eastern Francia and on its king Louis the German and the king's sons. The Annales also describe in some detail raids conducted by the Vikings in the Frankish Empire from 845 onward. Other events recorded in the Annales include various 'miraculous' events such as comets, earthquakes, and disease. The annals end in 901, a year after the succession of Louis the Child.

== Importance ==
Along with the Annales Bertiniani (Annals of Saint-Bertin), the West Frankish narratives of the same events, the Annals of Fulda are the principal historical primary source for ninth-century Carolingian studies.

The Historia Francorum abbreviata consists largely of extracts from the Annales Fuldenses.

== See also ==
- Reichsannalen

== Sources ==
- Kurze, Fridericus, ed. (1891). Annales Fuldenses sive Annales regni Francorum orientalis. Hannoverae: Impensis Bibliopolii Hahniani.
- Reuter, Timothy, ed. (1992). The Annals of Fulda. Manchester: Manchester University Press. ISBN 9780719034589.
- Pertz, Georgius Heinricus, ed. (1826). "Annales Fuldenses". Monumenta Germaniae Historica: Scriptores. Vol. 1. Hannoverae: Impensis Bibliopolii Aulici Hahniani. pp. 337–415.
