= List of Austrian Righteous Among the Nations =

This is a list of Austrian Righteous Among the Nations. As of 1 January 2018, 109 Austrians have been honored with this title by Yad Vashem for saving Jews during World War II.

== List ==
- Beran, Christa
- Boehm, Maria
- Bosko, Oswald
- Bottesi, Wanda
- Buchegger, Friederike
- Dietz, Anton
- Duschka, Reinhold
- Ehn, Anna
- Friessnegg, Anna and Ludwig
- Fritz, Charlotte
- Gröger, Karl B.
- Haas, Anna-Maria
- Harand, Irene
- Hauer, Edith (Frischmuth)
- Kleisinger, Dr. Ewald and Danuta
- Knapp, Ludwig and Maria
- Kuttelwascher, Otto and Mina
- Lanc, Dr. Artur and Maria
- Langbein, Hermann
- Legath, Gisela; children Frieda and Martin
- Leitner, Franz
- Linsinger, Balthasar
- Lutz, Erwin
- Madritsch, Julius
- Motesicky, Baron Karl
- Neff, Dorothea
- Pollreis, Luci
- Pscheidt, Johann
- Reinhard, Kurt
- Riss, Hermine
- Schauer, Maria
- Schmid, Anton
- Semrad, Ludwig
- Stecher, Edi
- Steiner, Maria
- Stocker, Maria
- Tschögl, Florian
- Tschoell, Dr. Leo
- Wertz, Dr. Rudolf
