= Dalovice =

Dalovice may refer to places in the Czech Republic:

- Dalovice (Karlovy Vary District), a municipality and village in the Karlovy Vary Region
- Dalovice (Mladá Boleslav District), a municipality and village in the Central Bohemian Region
