= Buchegger =

Buchegger is a Germanic surname of Alpine origin. Notable people with the surname include:

- Christine Buchegger (1942–2014), Austrian theater and television actress
- Friedericke Buchegger, Righteous Among the Nations
- Paul Buchegger (born 1996), Austrian volleyball player
- Sonja Buchegger, computer scientist
