= Ehn =

Ehn is a surname, and may refer to:

- Anna Ehn (born 1931), Austrian designated one of the Righteous Among the Nations
- Christoffer Ehn (born 1996), Swedish ice hockey player
- Erik Ehn, American playwright and director
- Karl Ehn (1884–1957), Viennese architect and city planner
- Tina Ehn (born 1960), Swedish Green Party politician
