= Frischmuth =

Frischmuth is a German surname. Notable people with the surname include:

- Barbara Frischmuth (1941–2025), Austrian writer and poet
- Edith Hauer-Frischmuth (1913–2004), Austrian Righteous Among the Nations woman
- Gert Frischmuth (1932–2012), German choral conductor and music educator
- Johann Frischmuth (1619–1687), German orientalist

== See also ==
- Frishmuth
