= Madritsch =

Madritsch (Croatian: Madrić) is an Austrian surname of South Slavic origin. Notable people with the surname include:

- Bobby Madritsch (born 1976), American baseball pitcher
- Julius Madritsch (1906–1984), Austrian Righteous Among the Nations
