= Kurt Reinhard =

Kurt Reinhard may refer to:

- Kurt Reinhard (musicologist) (1914–1979), German musicologist and ethnomusicologist
- Kurt Reinhard (Austrian Righteous among the Nations)
