= Wanda Bottesi =

Austrian Righteous Among the Nations

- Born: 1923; Innsbruck
- Died: 2008 (aged 84–85); Innsbruck
- Citizenship: Austrian
- Notable work: rescued the Jews Lorraine Justman-Visnicki and Mirjam Fuchs from the deportation to a concentration camp

Wanda Bottesi (1923 – 2008) was an Austrian Righteous Among the Nations. She was born in Innsbruck. In the summer of 1944 she rescued the Jews Lorraine Justman-Visnicki and Mirjam Fuchs from the deportation to a concentration camp. First she took the women to her apartment and hid them for a few weeks. A friend of her, police inspector Anton Dietz, managed to fake documents which declared the women Christian Poles. This way Lorraine Justman-Visnicki and Mirjam Fuchs could survive the war, working as foreign workers. Bottesi died in Innsbruck in 2008. In November, a tree was planted in her memory in Jerusalem, Israel.
