= Merbort =

Medieval German poet

Merbort was a medieval German poet whose work is almost entirely lost. Nothing is known of the poet himself. Only four lines of verse survive, printed in 1639 by Martin Opitz in his commentary on the Annolied. Opitz claimed to have a manuscript of the complete work, which he called a chronicle. The language of the verse is Middle High German, perhaps fourteenth century. The lines have recently been identified as a hitherto unknown translation of the Czech national epic, the so-called Dalimil. Two other Middle High German versions of Dalimil survive intact.

== Literature ==
- Graeme Dunphy, "Merborts Chronicon. Eine mittelhochdeutsche Dalimil-Übersetzung bei Martin Opitz", Euphorion 107 (2013), 259-268.
