= Frishmuth =

Frishmuth is an American form of the German surname Frischmuth. Notable people with the surname include:

- Harriet Whitney Frishmuth (1880-1980), American sculptor
- William Frishmuth (1830-1893), German-born American architect and metallurgist
