= Oswald Bosko =

Austrian policeman

- Died: 18 September 1944
- Known for: Righteous Among the Nations

Oswald Bosko (also spelled Bousko or Bouska) was an Austrian policeman from Vienna later stationed at the Jewish ghetto of Kraków from 1942 to 1944. He supported Julius Madritsch in rescuing Jews during World War II. Bosko was posthumously honored by the State of Israel as a Righteous Among the Nations, an award for a non-Jew who risked their life during the Holocaust to save Jews from extermination by the Nazis.

== Heroic deeds ==
In March, 1943, the Nazis decided to liquidate the ghetto in Kraków and to deport all children who lived there in order to kill them. Oswald Bosko and Julius Madritsch helped hundreds of children to escape the ghetto. He also found people who were willing to house them temporarily.

Bosko once had studied to be a Catholic monk but then abandoned that vocation and joined the Nazi Party; he even joined "an illegal SS unit set up by [Heinrich] Himmler to act as a fifth column against the Austrian government" after the Nazi Party was outlawed in Austria in the summer of 1933. Yet Bosko turned against the Nazis after Hitler's annexation of Austria in 1938. In Kraków, the "tall and blond" Bosko "used his loud scream to hide his deeper feelings" to aid Jews. Bosko also occasionally accepted bribes and "when he fled Kraków in the summer of 1944, he carried a suitcase of his ill-gotten contraband with him." While accepting compensation in rescuing Jews ran counter to the requirements for naming someone Righteous Among Nations, according to Oskar Schindler biographer David M. Crowe, several writers who have examined Bosko's efforts, "all agree that many Jews and Poles owed their lives" to Bosko.

After the liquidation of the ghetto, Bosko looked for Jewish families that hid from the Nazis. Whoever he found, he managed to bring to Madritsch's textile factory. Then he organized a rescue.

In historian Crowe's telling, Bosko sought to avoid transfer to the Eastern Front when he "injected himself with a drug that made him severely ill" and he was hospitalized. He then fled with a Polish mistress and two Jewish children. He wrote his commanding officer that partisans had kidnapped him, but the officer soon determined otherwise. Bosko was ultimately captured, court-martialed for treason, desertion, and disobedience, and sentenced to death. Israel's Yad Vashem website cites September 18, 1944 as the date of Bosko's execution, while Crowe lists it as October 18, 1944.

== Later developments ==
In 1964, Yad Vashem recognized Oswald Bosko as Righteous Among the Nations. In 1982, Bosko appeared in the historically based novel Schindler's List, written by Australian novelist Thomas Keneally.

== See also ==
- The Holocaust in Poland
