= Chronicle of Dalimil =

Czech historical literary work

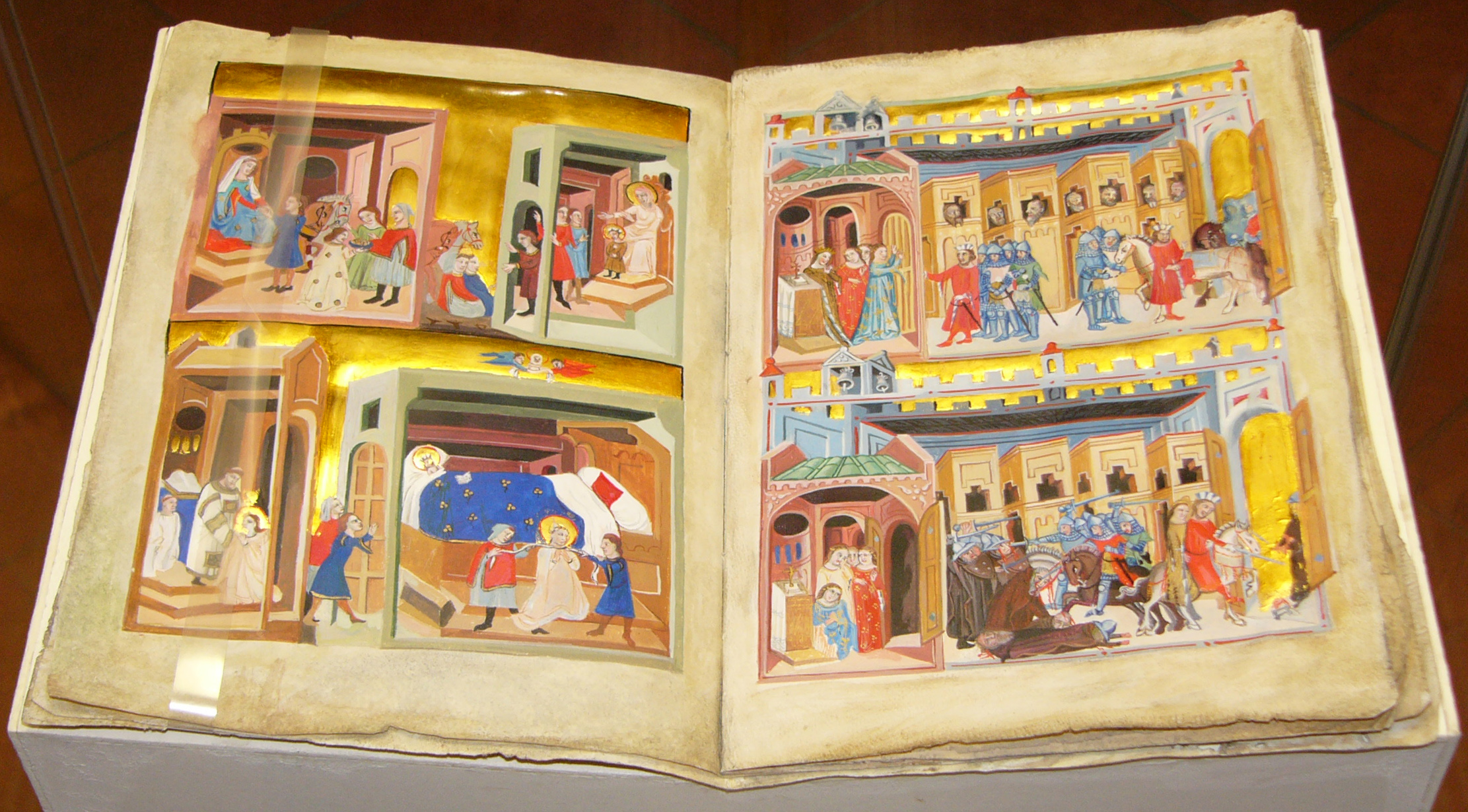
Illustrated manuscript of a Latin translation of the Chronicle of Dalimil

The Chronicle of Dalimil (Czech: Dalimilova kronika; Kronika tak řečeného Dalimila) is the first chronicle written in the Old Czech language.

It was composed in verse by an unknown author at the beginning of the 14th century. The Chronicle compiles information from older Czech chronicles written in Latin (like Chronica Boemorum), and also the author's own experiences. The chronicle finishes before 1314, but it is usually published including the entries of later authors describing events up to 1319.

There exist 14 manuscripts and fragments, with two different redactions. The Dalimil was translated three times into Middle High German (including the recently identified translation by Merbort), and once into Latin.

== Content ==
The author edited, extended and reinterpreted the content from other chronicles, but also omitting parts of Chronica Boemorum. This is evident already in the beginning, replacing the Chronica Boemorum description of the desolated land of Germania to which came a chieftain called Bohemus, with a narrative about the Tower of Babel, migration of people of different language, choosing a land (with language, people and land having interchangeable meaning).

Then says how "Among others the Serbians settled at the sea where the Greeks live. They proliferated till Rome. Among the Serbian people a land is located which bears the name Charváti/Charvaty" (Croats, Croatians as/of people). The land in the literature is often translated as Croatia, but Pavlína Rychterová emphasized that the word Charváti/Charvaty is plural of Charvat (Croat/Croatian, not medieval Czech Charvacie for Croatia). One man in that land "committed a murder and thus lost his right to his land", and with a similar story to that of Moses, came back from a mountain and decided to settle with his people the lands below it. In the next chapters are mentioned Krok and his daughters Kazi, Teta and Libuše, then Přemysl the Ploughman, and so on.

== Assessment ==
The validity of the events are nowadays rejected by some western historians as purely mythological folklore, an archetypal origin myth. The events in the chronicle seem to simply reinterpret the myth of Lech, Czech, and Rus that is repeated in various forms in many other historical records and national chronicles, like Primary Chronicle. In its identification narrative was, according to Jan Lehár, "an 'unproductive' type of historiographical work". It was written at the time when new dynasty, the House of Luxembourg, took over Bohemia which possibly caused a need for new understanding of the past and present collective identity as well as consolation among locals.
