= Dalovice (Karlovy Vary District) =

- Municipality
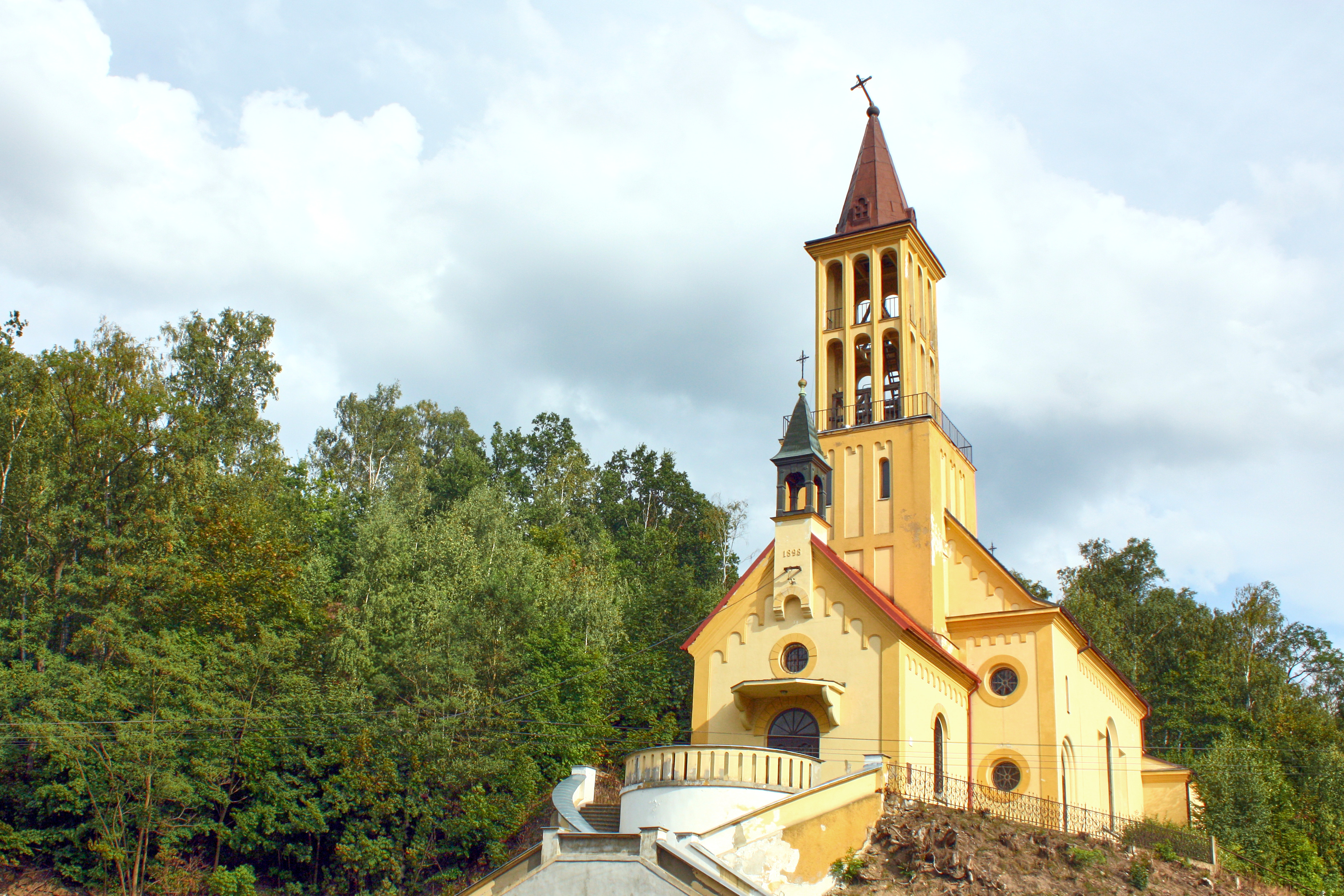
- Church of Our Lady of Consolation

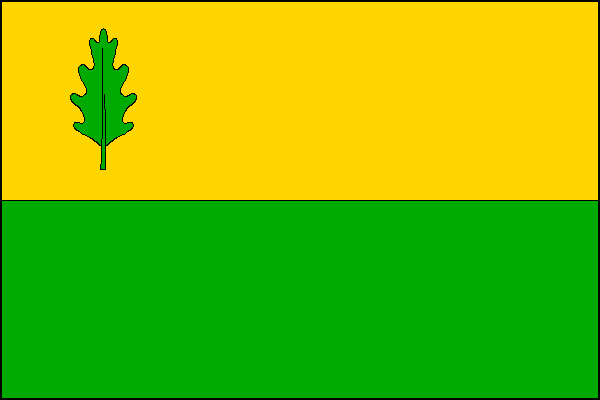
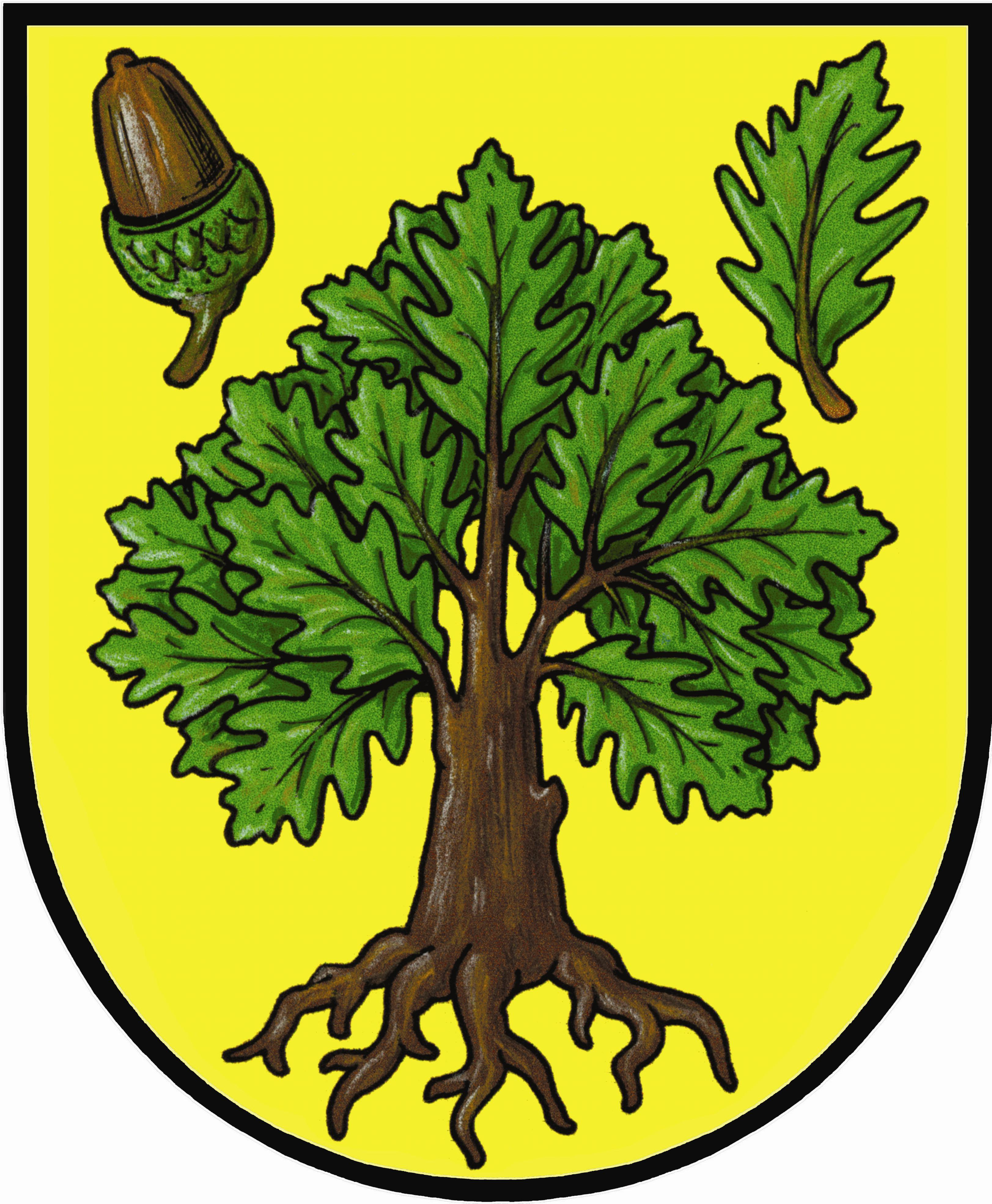
- Flag Coat of arms

- Location in the Czech Republic
- Coordinates: 50°14′52″N 12°53′45″E
- Country: Czech Republic
- Region: Karlovy Vary
- District: Karlovy Vary
- First mentioned: 1498

Area
  - Total: 6.28 km^{2} (2.42 sq mi)
- Elevation: 400 m (1,300 ft)

Population (2026-01-01)
  - Total: 1,992
  - Density: 317/km^{2} (822/sq mi)
- Time zone: UTC+1 (CET)
  - Summer (DST): UTC+2 (CEST)
- Postal code: 362 63
- Website: www.ou-dalovice.cz

Dalovice (German: Dallwitz) is a municipality and village in Karlovy Vary District in the Karlovy Vary Region of the Czech Republic. It has about 2,000 inhabitants.

== Administrative division ==
Dalovice consists of three municipal parts (in brackets population according to the 2021 census):

- Dalovice (1,183)
- Všeborovice (413)
- Vysoká (292)

== Etymology ==
The name is derived from the personal name Dála (a shortened form of names like Dalibor and Dalimil), meaning "the village of Dála's people".

== Geography ==
Dalovice is located about 2 kilometres (1 mi) northeast of Karlovy Vary. It lies in the Sokolov Basin. The highest point is the hill Ptačí vrch at 489 m (1,604 ft) above sea level. The stream Vitický potok flows across the municipality and then joins the Ohře River, which flows along the southern municipal border.

== History ==
The first written mention of Dalovice is from 1498. It was a large estate, but not rich in income. The owners of the estate often changed. Among the most notable owners were the noble families of Pernštejn, Kolowrat and Piccolomini. In 1871–1945, the estate was owned by the Riedl von Riedenstein family.

== Demographics ==
Historical population

Year	Pop.	±%
1869	1,536	—
1880	2,028	+32.0%
1890	2,391	+17.9%
1900	2,949	+23.3%
1910	3,331	+13.0%

Year	Pop.	±%
1921	3,276	−1.7%
1930	3,704	+13.1%
1950	1,895	−48.8%
1961	2,125	+12.1%
1970	1,880	−11.5%

Year	Pop.	±%
1980	1,895	+0.8%
1991	1,766	−6.8%
2001	1,812	+2.6%
2011	1,870	+3.2%
2021	1,888	+1.0%

Source: Censuses

== Transport ==
The I/13 road (part of the European route E442) from Karlovy Vary to Liberec runs through the municipality.

Dalovice is located on the railway line Cheb–Kadaň via Karlovy Vary.

== Sights ==
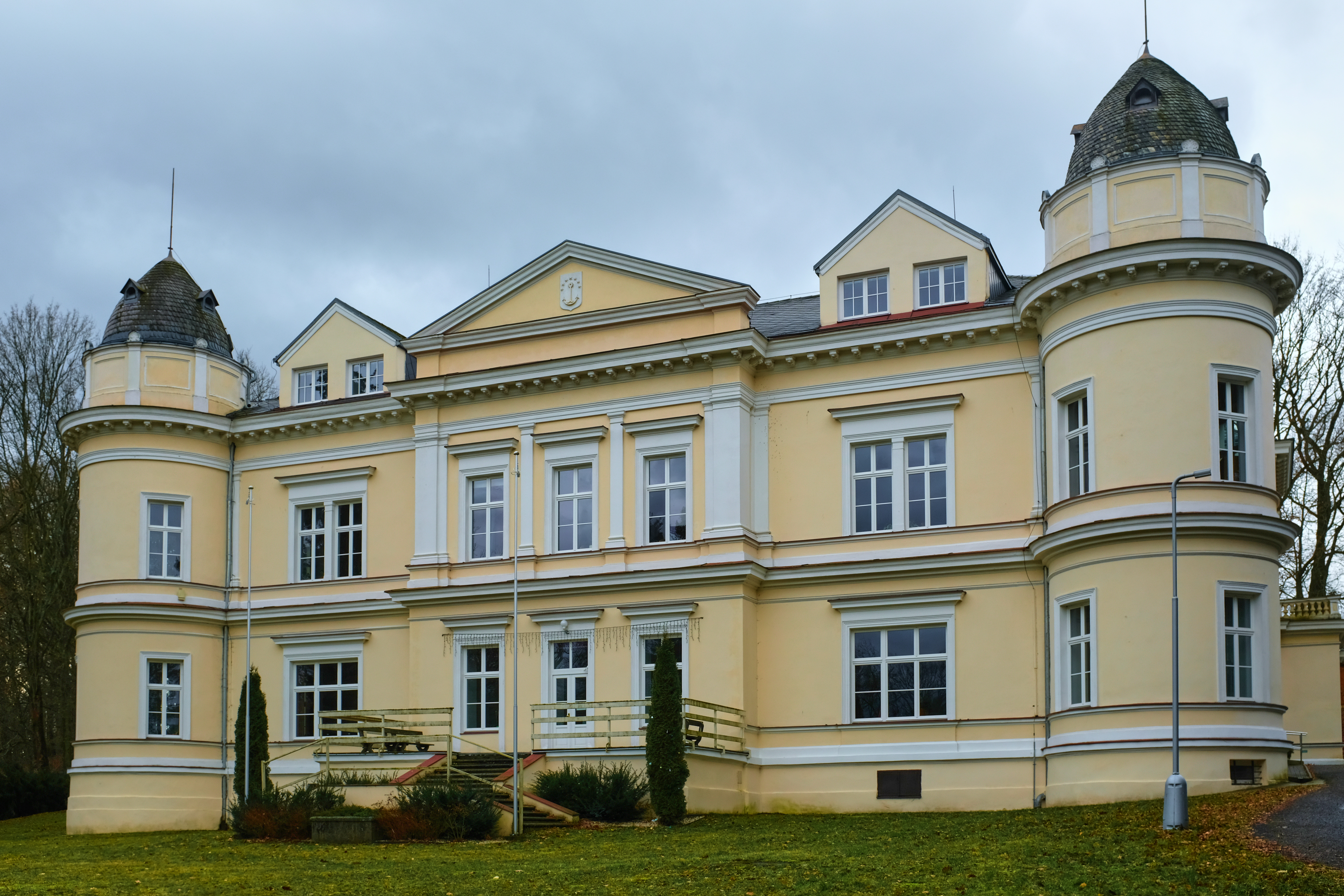
Dalovice Castle

The main landmark of Dalovice is the Church of Our Lady of Consolation. It was built in the pseudo-Romanesque style in 1929, on the site of a chapel from around 1898. The church has a distinctive bell tower with unique architectural design within the region.

The Dalovice Castle was built in the Neo-Renaissance style in 1874–1875. It is surrounded by a park. Today the castle houses a secondary school.

== Notable people ==
- Anton Dietz (1888–1960), Austrian police officer and Righteous Among the Nations
