= Angelica Bäumer =

Austrian art critic and art historian (1932–2025)

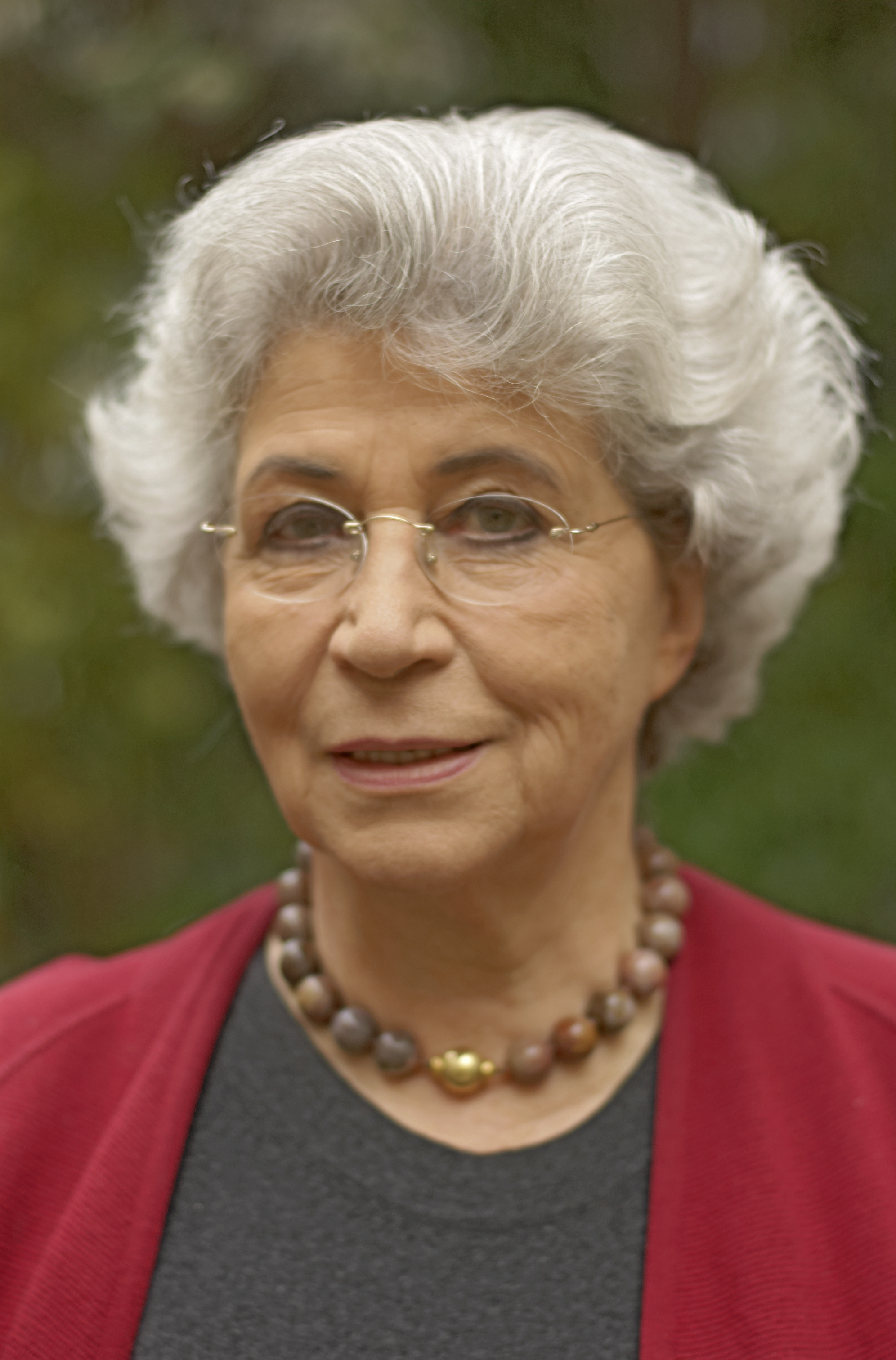
- Born: 13 January 1932; Frankfurt, Hesse
- Died: 18 July 2025 (aged 93)
- Burial place: Hietzing Cemetery, Vienna, Austria
- Education: University of Music and Performing Arts Vienna; University of Applied Arts Vienna
- Occupations: Art critic, art historian, and exhibition curator
- Employer: Österreichischer Rundfunk
- Organization: International Association of Art Critics (AICA)

Angelica Bäumer (13 January 1932 – 18 July 2025) was an Austrian art critic, art historian, and exhibition curator who specialised in Art Brut and photography. She was also a survivor of the Holocaust.

== Early life and family ==
Bäumer was born on 13 January 1932 in Frankfurt, Hesse. Her father was the German painter Eduard Bäumer [de]. Her mother Valerie Bäumer (née Feix) came from a Jewish Viennese family of manufacturers. They met in the 1920s whilst both students of the Swiss painter Johannes Ittenat at the Städelschen Kunstinstitut in Frankfurt.

Bäumer was the eldest of three children in her family. Her siblings were called Michael and Bettina.

Bäumer's fathers painting were considered "degenerate art" by Nazi Germans and her family's assets were confiscated once the Nazi Party came to power. Her maternal grandmother, Ida Feix, was deported to the Theresienstadt concentration camp at Auschwitz II-Birkenau, Poland.

Bäumer and her immediate family fled to Salzburg, Austria, as it was safer there than in Germany until the annexation of Austria in 1938. Bäumer's mother was denounced to the Nazis by a relative in 1943 and she was persecuted as a "full Jew." Bäumer and her two siblings were considered "mixed race" and were not allowed to attend school. Bäumer, her mother and siblings were forced to wear the yellow Star of David and their passports were stamped with a large "J" for "Jew." Her parents were forced to labour.

Bäumer and her family escaped from Salzburg and fled to the village Grossarl in August 1944, where they were sheltered by Austrian Catholic priest Balthasar Linsinger. They sheltered in Grossarl, with false identities, and Bäumer's father painted a ceiling fresco in Linsinger's church. They did not have ration cards, but Bäumer and her family managed to survive the war. After the war, the family returned to Salzburg, where Bäumer worked supporting Jewish children who had survived the concentration camps and wanted to emigrate to Israel.

Bäumer spoke about her childhood experiences in World War II as a contemporary witness at live events, schools and for recorded interviews, including for the Witness of Our Time series. She also successfully campaigned for Balthasar Linsinger to be honoured as Righteous Among the Nations by Yad Vashem and he was added to the list on 13 April 2011.

Bäumer married urban planner and architecture critic Paulhans Peters.

== Career ==
Bäumer studied music at the University of Music and Performing Arts Vienna, then art history, architecture and tapestry weaving at the University of Applied Arts Vienna.

From 1971, worked for the Austrian national broadcaster Österreichischer Rundfunk (ORF), reporting on art and culture and making documentaries. In 1984, she became secretary to the Social Democratic Party of Austria (SPÖ) politician and then Minister of Education Herbert Moritz [de].

As an art critic, Bäumer specialised in the Art Brut movement and photography. Her feminist work about the Austrian symbolist painter Gustav Klimt and women was translated from German to English by the Czech translator Ewald Osers in 1986. She also wrote about Austrian artists including Soshana Afroyim, Otto Mauer [de], Herbert Stejskal, and Irma Rafaela Toledo [de], as well as the Austrian photographer Erich Lessing.

As a curator, Bäumer exhibited with Harald Gfader [de] and Robert Kabas. She was commissioner of Biennial art festivals in Sydney (1988) and Puerto Rico (1993, 1995 and 1997).

In the 1990s, Bäumer was chairwoman and managing director of the Lower Austrian Cultural Forum, a member of the Lower Austrian Cultural Senate. She was also head of the Austrian editorial team of the German art magazine "neue bildende kunst." Bäumer was also a board member of the International Association of Art Critics (AICA) (a UNESCO NGO based in Paris, France) and was President of the Friends' Association for the Vienna Künstlerhaus.

Bäumer was honoured as a Berufstitel Professor [de] in 1988 and was a recipient of the Golden Medal of Honor for services to the state of Lower Austria.

== Later life and death ==
A multi-disciplinary symposium was held in Vienna in November 2012 in honour of Bäumer's 80th birthday.

Bäumer died on 18 July 2025 in Austria, aged 93. She was buried in the Hietzing Cemetery in Vienna, Austria.
