= Dalovice (Mladá Boleslav District) =

- Municipality
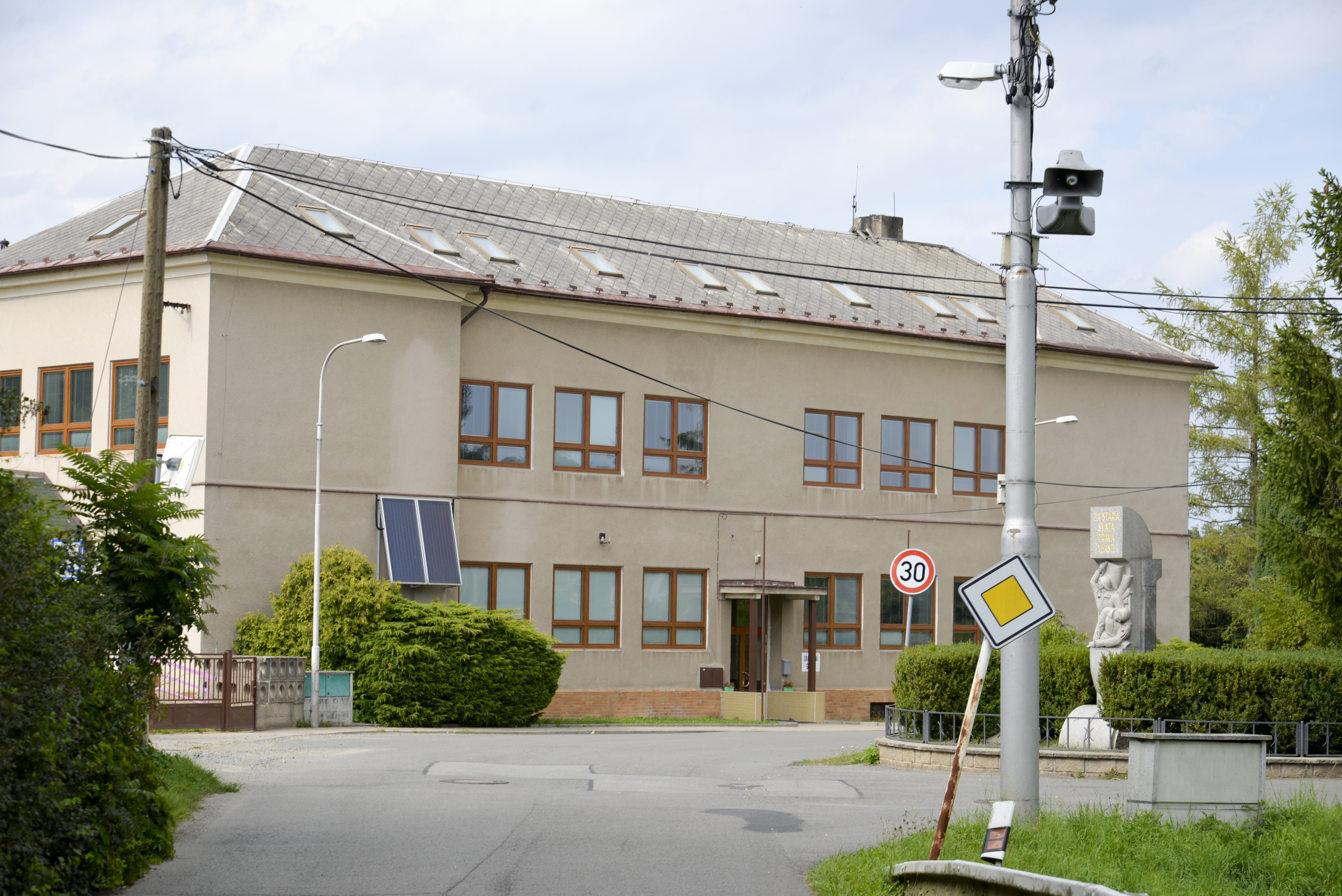
- Primary school

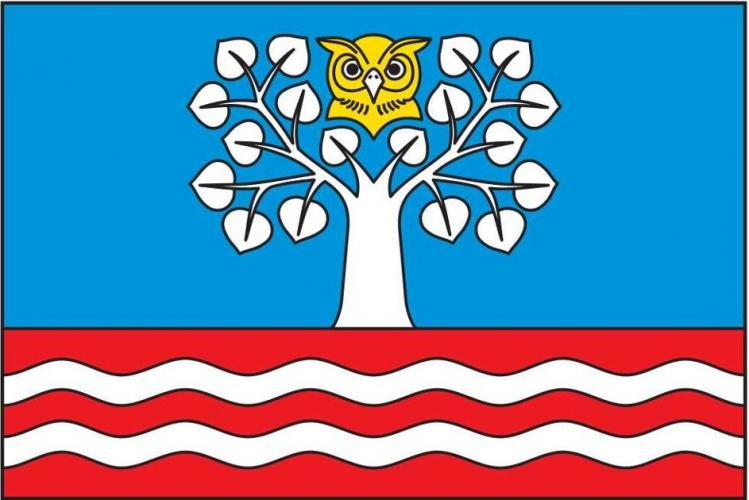
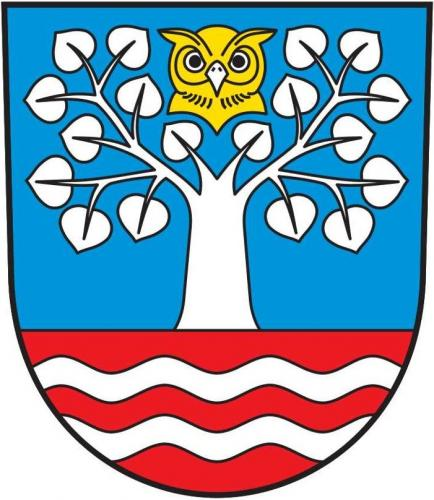
- Flag Coat of arms

- Location in the Czech Republic
- Coordinates: 50°25′33″N 14°52′48″E
- Country: Czech Republic
- Region: Central Bohemian
- District: Mladá Boleslav
- First mentioned: 1398

Area
  - Total: 3.88 km^{2} (1.50 sq mi)
- Elevation: 255 m (837 ft)

Population (2026-01-01)
  - Total: 273
  - Density: 70.4/km^{2} (182/sq mi)
- Time zone: UTC+1 (CET)
  - Summer (DST): UTC+2 (CEST)
- Postal code: 293 01
- Website: obecdalovice.cz

Dalovice is a municipality and village in Mladá Boleslav District in the Central Bohemian Region of the Czech Republic. It has about 300 inhabitants.

== Administrative division ==
Dalovice consists of two municipal parts (in brackets population according to the 2021 census):

- Dalovice (252)
- U Česany (0)

== Etymology ==
The name is derived from the personal name Dála (a shortened form of names like Dalibor and Dalimil), meaning "the village of Dála's people".

== Geography ==
Dalovice is located about 2 kilometres (1 mi) west of Mladá Boleslav and 44 km (27 mi) northeast of Prague. It lies in an agricultural landscape in the Jizera Table. The highest point is at 280 m (920 ft) above sea level. The municipality is situated on the right bank of the Jizera River.

== History ==
The first written mention of Dalovice is from 1398.

== Demographics ==
Historical population

Year	Pop.	±%
1869	263	—
1880	274	+4.2%
1890	348	+27.0%
1900	491	+41.1%
1910	668	+36.0%

Year	Pop.	±%
1921	582	−12.9%
1930	538	−7.6%
1950	418	−22.3%
1961	311	−25.6%
1970	284	−8.7%

Year	Pop.	±%
1980	237	−16.5%
1991	187	−21.1%
2001	195	+4.3%
2011	192	−1.5%
2021	252	+31.2%

Source: Censuses

== Economy ==
In the municipality is an industrial zone formed by buildings of the Technology and Development Centre of Škoda Auto. It was built on the site of a former textile factory in 2018.

== Transport ==
There are no railways or major roads passing through the municipality.

== Sights ==
There are no protected cultural monuments in the municipality.

== Notable people ==
- Miloslav Mansfeld (1912–1991), fighter pilot
- Josef Ludl (1916–1998), footballer
