= Miloslav Mansfeld =

Czechoslovak fighter ace in World War II

- Born: 14 December 1912; Dalovice, Bohemia, Austria-Hungary
- Died: 22 October 1991 (aged 78); London, England
- Burial place: Brookwood Cemetery, Surrey
- Military career
- Allegiance: (Czech Republic) Czechoslovakia; France; United Kingdom
- Branch: Czechoslovak Air Force; French Foreign Legion; Armée de l'Air; Royal Air Force
- Service years: 1930–1958
- Rank: Squadron Leader
- Units: No. 111 Squadron RAF; No. 68 Squadron RAF
- Commands: "A" Flight, No. 68 Squadron RAF
- Conflicts: Second World War
- Awards: Distinguished Service Order; Distinguished Flying Cross; Air Force Cross; 1939–1945 Star with Battle of Britain clasp; Air Crew Europe Star with Atlantic clasp; Defence Medal; War Medal 1939–1945; Queen's Commendation for Valuable Service; Czechoslovak War Cross 1939–1945 × 5; Československá medaile Za chrabrost před nepřítelem; Československá medaile za zásluhy, First Class; Pamětní medaile československé armády v zahraničí with France and Great Britain bars; Československý vojenský řád Za svobodu 2nd class; Order of Brotherhood and Unity (Yugoslavia)
- Other work: Daily Express distribution manager

Miloslav Mansfeld DSO DFC AFC (14 December 1912 – 22 October 1991) was a Czechoslovak fighter pilot who became a flying ace in the UK's Royal Air Force (RAF) in the Second World War.

Mansfeld was a Czechoslovak Air Force pilot in the 1930s, flying initially reconnaissance aircraft, then night fighters and latterly bombers. When Germany occupied and partitioned Czechoslovakia in 1939 he escaped via Poland to France. When France capitulated in 1940 Mansfeld was evacuated to Britain, where he joined the Royal Air Force Volunteer Reserve.

From 1941 to 1944 Mansfeld flew Bristol Beaufighters with the Czechoslovak flight of No. 68 Squadron RAF and scored most of his victories. From 1944 he flew de Havilland Mosquitoes, with which he shot down two V-1 flying bombs.

In 1945 Mansfeld returned to Czechoslovakia, but after the Czechoslovak Communist Party seized power in 1948 he returned to Britain and the RAF. He flew Gloster Meteor jet fighters, specialised in photoreconnaissance and commanded a squadron. In 1958 he left the RAF for a civilian career. He retired in 1970 and died in 1991.

== Early life ==
Mansfeld was born in Dalovice in central Bohemia in 1912. His father served in the Austrian Imperial-Royal Landwehr on the Eastern Front in the First World War. After Mansfeld left school he trained as a car mechanic.

=== Czechoslovak Air Force ===
In 1930 Mansfeld joined the Czechoslovak Air Force. He was trained at the military aviation school at Prostějov. In 1932 he qualified as a pilot and on 1 July was posted to a reconnaissance squadron of the 72nd Air Regiment at Milovice in central Bohemia.

In May 1934 he started training at Prostějov to be a fighter pilot. He completed the course on 1 July and was posted to the 91st Night Fighter Squadron of the 6th Air Regiment at Prague-Kbely. In May and June 1935 he received night fighter training at Prague. On 1 April 1936 the air force commissioned Mansfeld as an officer.

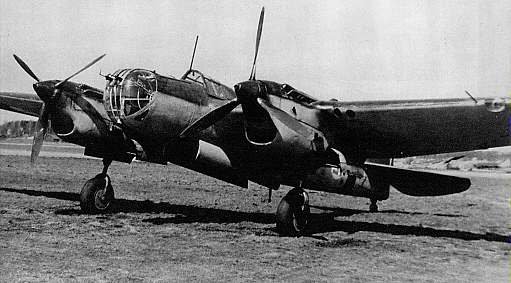
In April 1938 Mansfeld flew a new Tupolev SB medium bomber from the USSR to Czechoslovakia

In 1937 Czechoslovakia ordered 60 Tupolev SB medium bombers from the Soviet Union. In April 1938 Mansfeld was a member of the Czechoslovak aircrew flying one of the bombers on its delivery flight from the USSR to Czechoslovakia.

On 29 September 1938 France and the United Kingdom signed the Munich Agreement, which forced Czechoslovakia to cede the Sudetenland to Nazi Germany. From 1 January 1939 Mansfeld was based at Letňany on the edge of Prague.

On 15 March 1939 Germany occupied Czechoslovakia and imposed the Protectorate of Bohemia and Moravia, which the next day dissolved the Czechoslovak armed forces in its territory.

On 3 June a group of airmen including Mansfeld escaped across the border into Poland at Český Těšín in Czech Silesia. The group was detained by Polish border guards, but was then escorted to the Czechoslovak Consulate in Kraków. Mansfeld was then accommodated in Czechoslovak transit camp at Bronowice Małe that had been converted from a disused Austro-Hungarian Army camp.

== In France ==
On 16 July a group of Czechoslovak airmen including Mansfeld left Bronowice Małe for the Port of Gdynia. There they embarked on a ship that took them to Boulogne-sur-Mer in France.

The Czechoslovak Ambassador in Paris reached agreement with the French Government that Czechoslovak volunteers could join the French Foreign Legion for a five-year term, on the understanding that if war broke out they would be released to form a Czechoslovak army in exile. On 3 September 1939 France and the United Kingdom declared war on Germany. Mansfeld joined the Foreign Legion and on 2 October was posted to Sidi Bel Abbès in French Algeria for army training.

=== French Air Force ===
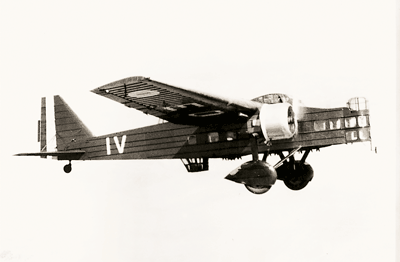
The French Air Force trained Mansfeld on obsolescent bombers including the Bloch MB.200

On 17 November the French Government and Czechoslovak National Liberation Committee agreed that Czechoslovak airmen would be transferred from the Foreign Legion to the French Air Force pending the formation of a Czechoslovak air force. On 27 November 1939 Mansfeld was posted to Châteauroux-Déols Air Base in central France for training.

On 10 May 1940 Germany invaded the Netherlands and Belgium and attacked France. On 21 May Mansfeld was posted to Tafraoui airfield near Oran in French Algeria for training on obsolescent Bloch MB.200 and Bloch MB.210 bomber aircraft.

After France capitulated to Germany on 22 June, Mansfeld was evacuated by the British-India Steam Navigation Company ship Neuralia, which reached Liverpool, England on 12 July.

== Royal Air Force ==
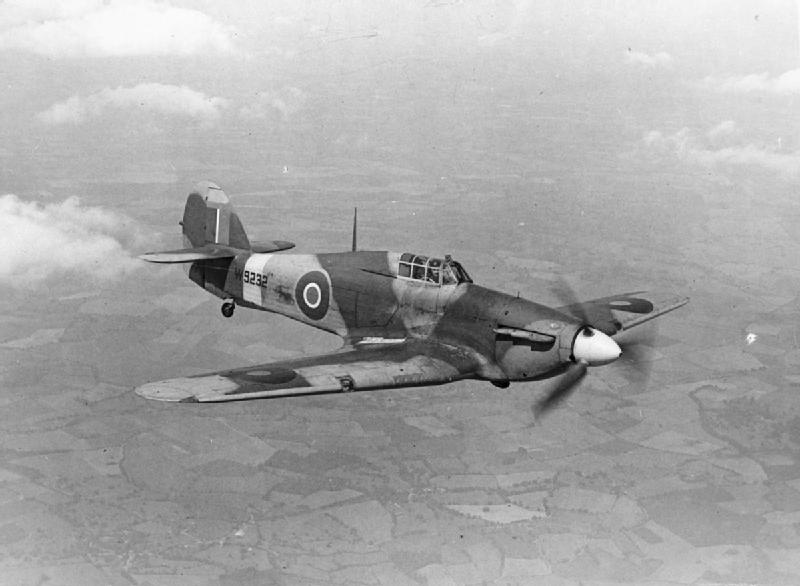
From October 1940 Mansfeld flew a Hawker Hurricane Mk I fighter with 111 Squadron

On 25 July 1940 Mansfeld enlisted in the RAF Volunteer Reserve as a sergeant. On 21 September 1940 he was posted to No. 6 Operational Training Unit at RAF Sutton Bridge in Lincolnshire who trained him on the Hawker Hurricane Mk I fighter.

On 5 October 1940 Mansfeld was posted to No. 111 Squadron RAF in Scotland. On 13 November, with Pilot Officer Peter Simpson and Sgt Otmar Kučera, he shot down a Heinkel He 111 medium bomber over the North Sea. In the winter of 1940–41 the RAF commissioned Mansfeld as a Pilot Officer.

=== Night fighter pilot ===
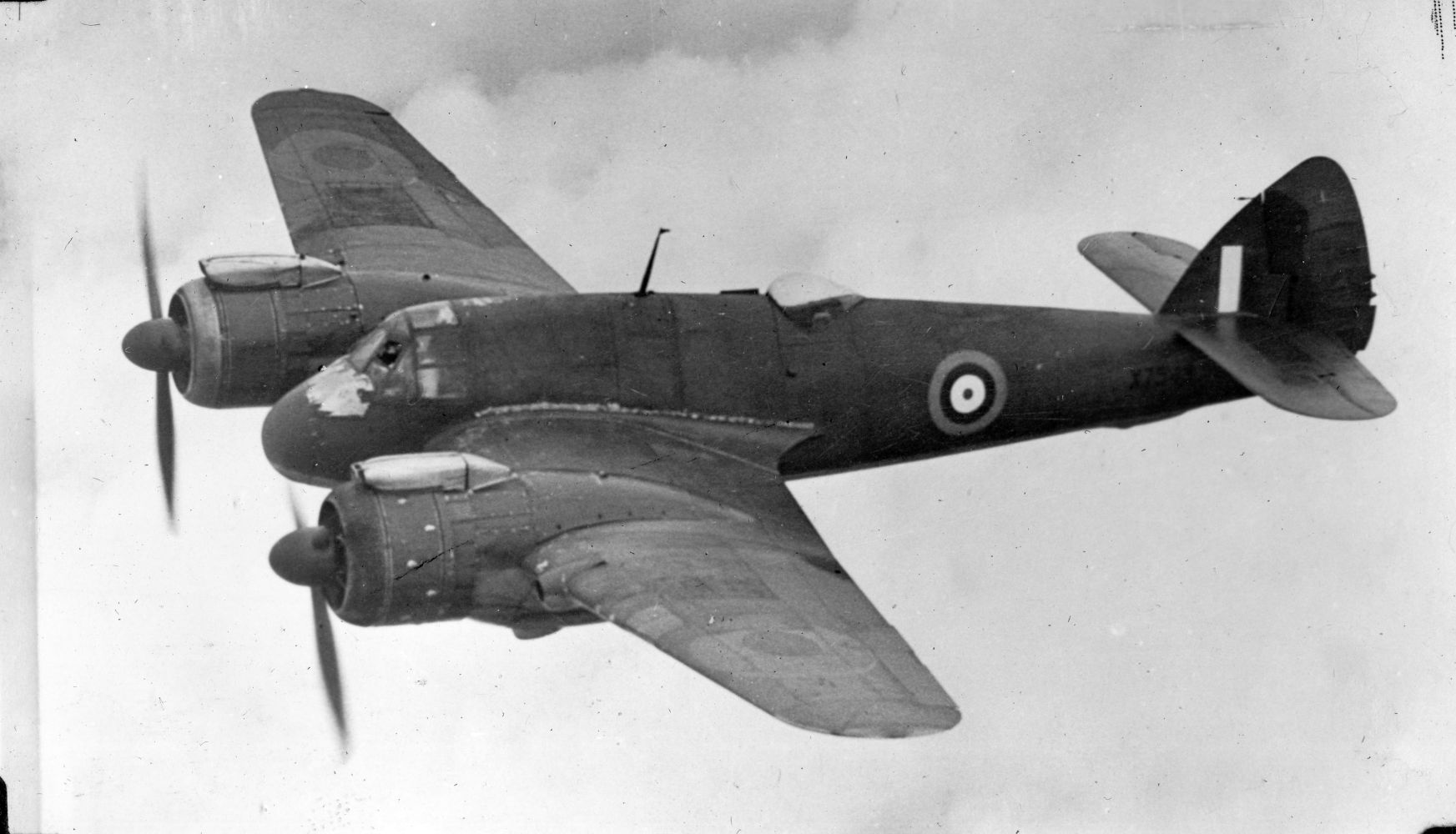
From July 1941 Mansfeld flew a Bristol Beaufighter with 68 Squadron, usually with Slavomil Janáček as his radar operator

On 22 April 1941 Mansfeld was posted to No. 54 Operational Training Unit (OTU) at RAF Church Fenton in the West Riding of Yorkshire where he was trained to fly twin-engined, twin-seat night fighters. The aircraft were equipped with aircraft interception (AI) radar, the AI Mk IV. A fellow Czechoslovak, Sergeant Slavomil Janáček, was trained alongside Mansfeld as his radar operator.

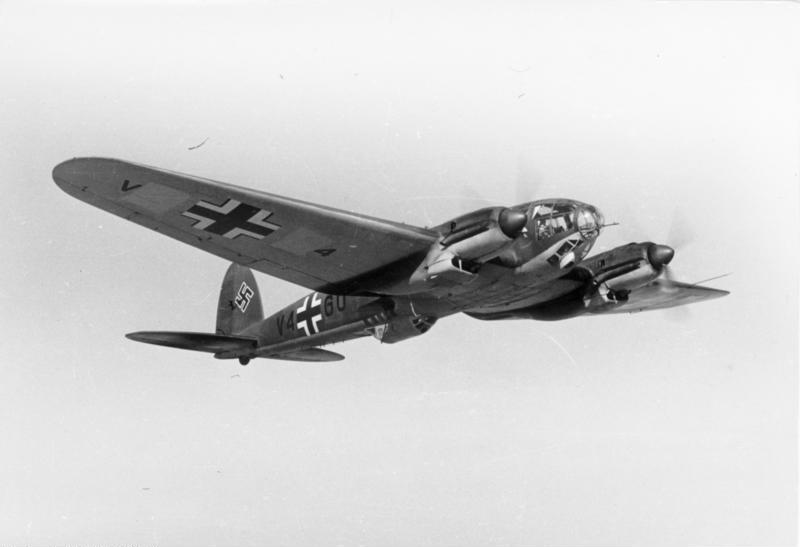
As a Beaufighter pilot Mansfeld shot down five Heinkel He 111 medium bombers and damaged another

On 18 July 1941 Mansfeld and Janáček were posted to No. 68 Squadron RAF, which was a night fighter unit and at the time operated Bristol Beaufighter Mk IF night fighters. The pair arrived just as the squadron's "A" Flight was becoming a Czechoslovak-manned unit.

On the night of 12/13 October 1941 Mansfeld and Janáček shot down a Junkers Ju 88 medium bomber and damaged another. On another occasion Mansfeld, flying with Sgt Rudolf Husar as his radar operator, shot down a Heinkel He 111 H-6 of VIII/Kampfgeschwader 40. It crashed into the Irish Sea off Holyhead, Wales, killing its four crew.

On 12 November 1941 Mansfeld shot down two He 111 bombers of III/Kg 40 over the Irish Sea and damaged a third.

On the night of 30 April and 1 May 1942 Mansfeld and Janáček shot down two He 111s over the North Sea off East Anglia. In the same patrol they and another 68 Squadron Beaufighter, with Squadron Leader Vlastimil Vesely as pilot and Flying Officer J F Mongomerie as radar operator, shared in shooting down a Dornier Do 217 bomber. That night Mansfeld and Janáček's Beaufighter was slightly damaged by enemy fire but the two men were unharmed. On 23 June Mansfeld was awarded the Distinguished Flying Cross.

On 22 October 1942 Mansfeld was promoted to second-in-command of "B" flight, 68 Squadron. On the night of 10/11 December he and Janáček shot down a Do 217 over the North Sea about 50 miles (80 km) off Cromer in Norfolk.

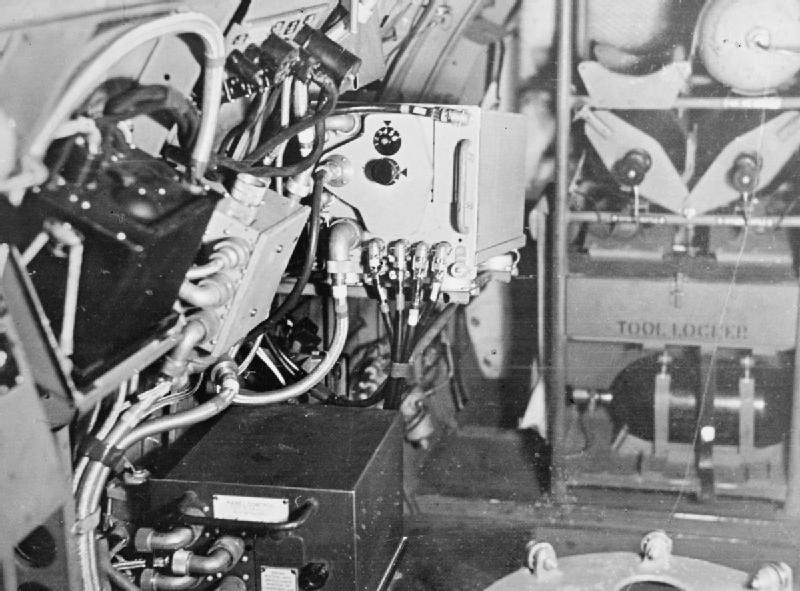
AI Mk. VIII radar receiver unit in the cockpit of a Bristol Beaufighter

68 Squadron was later re-equipped with Bristol Beaufighter Mk VIF night fighters with an improved radar, the AI Mk VIII. On 15 March 1943 Mansfeld and Janáček shot down a Ju 88.

On 15 May 1943 Mansfeld was posted to No. 51 OTU at RAF Cranfield in Bedfordshire as a night fighter instructor. On 9 June 1943 he was posted to No. 3 Flying Instructors' School at RAF Castle Combe in Wiltshire to become a flying instructor.

On 10 October 1943 Mansfeld was posted back to 68 Squadron to command "A" Flight. On the night of 14/15 May 1944 Mansfeld and Janáček shot down two Do 217s over the English Channel.

=== Mosquito pilot ===
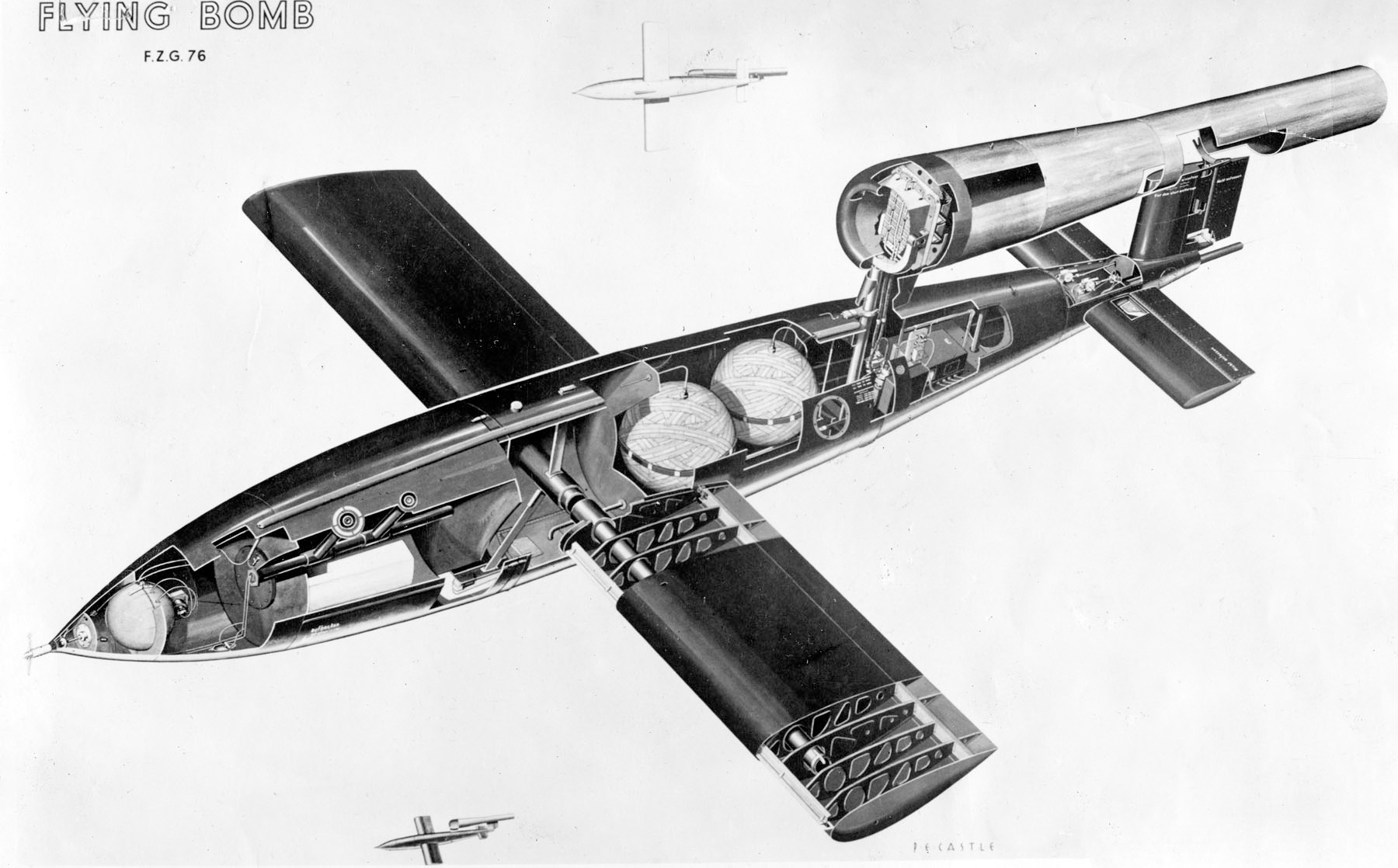
Mansfeld shot down two V-1 flying bombs

On 13 June 1944 the first German V-1 flying bomb hit London. Allied countermeasures included equipping and training fighter units to intercept them. In July 1944 68 Squadron was re-equipped with a fighter version of the de Havilland Mosquito. Mansfeld shot down two V-1s: one over England on 27 July and the other over the North Sea on 24 October.

By the end of the war Mansfeld had been promoted to Squadron Leader. On 4 May 1945 he was awarded the Distinguished Service Order.

Mansfeld flew 489 operational hours, 386 of which were at night. He had shot down eight enemy aircraft, shared in shooting down two others and shot down two V-1 flying bombs.

== After the war ==
In August 1945, three months after Germany surrendered, Czechoslovak airmen and women left the RAFVR and returned to Czechoslovakia. Mansfeld initially worked for the Ministry of Defence in Prague and then was posted to Plzeň in Bohemia as commander of the 24th Bomber Regiment. But in February 1948 the Czechoslovak Communist Party seized power and on 12 April Mansfeld was placed on enforced leave as part of a purge that removed non-Communists from the Czechoslovak Army and air force.

Mansfeld escaped by illegally crossing the border into the American zone of occupied Germany. On 27 May Czechoslovakia declared him a deserter, and on 17 July it demoted him in absentia to private.

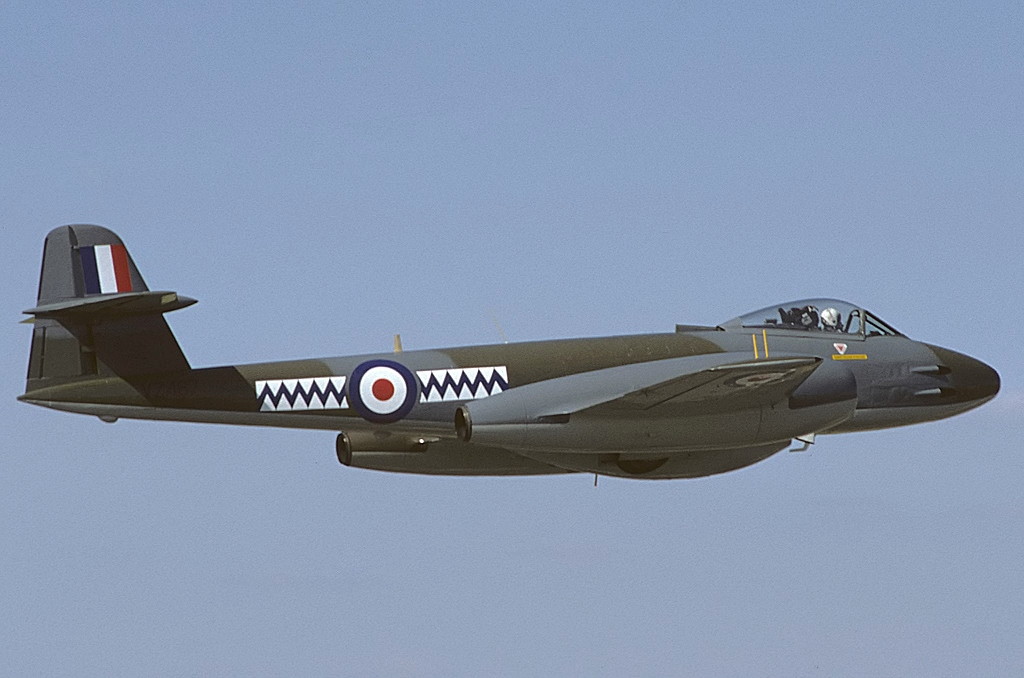
After returning to Britain and the RAF in 1948 Mansfeld flew Gloster Meteor jet fighters

Mansfeld returned to Britain and in July 1948 rejoined the RAF. He flew Mosquitoes and then converted to the Gloster Meteor jet fighter. He commanded a squadron of the 13th Photoreconnaissance Wing.

In 1958 he retired from the RAF. He worked as a distribution manager for the Daily Express newspaper, thanks to his friendship with Max Aitken Jnr. from the period when Max was his CO in 68 Squadron, until he retired in 1970.

=== Rehabilitation ===
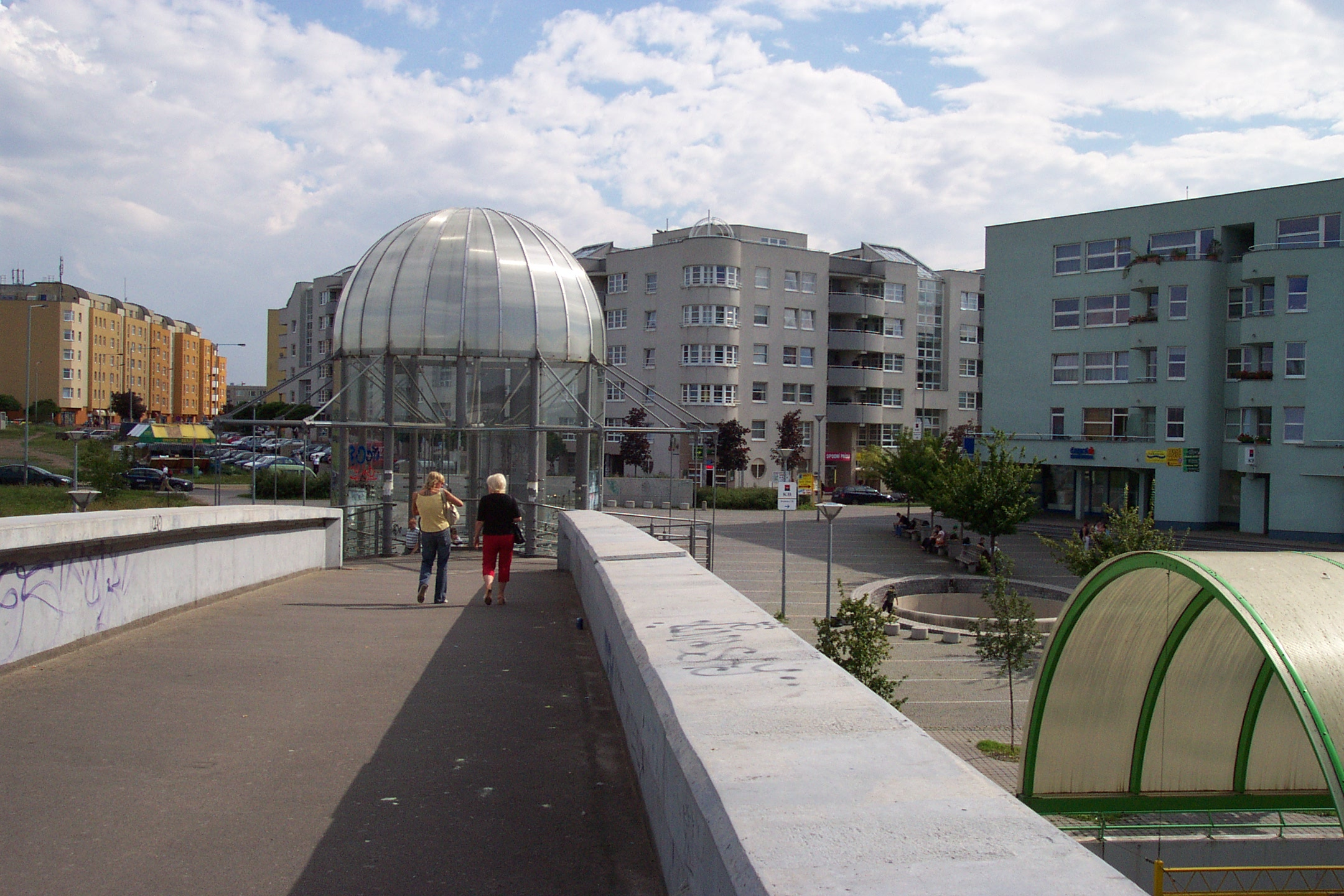
View across the footbridge outside Černý Most metro station in Prague, looking toward Mansfeldova street

In November and December 1989 the Velvet Revolution ended Communist rule in Czechoslovakia. On 10 September 1991 the Czech and Slovak Federative Republic promoted Mansfeld to Major-General. On 21 October the same year he died in hospital in London.

Mansfeld is buried in Brookwood Cemetery, Surrey. A street in the Černý Most suburb of Prague is named "Mansfeldova" in his honour.

== Honours and awards ==
Distinguished Service Order
Distinguished Flying Cross
Air Force Cross
1939–1945 Star with Battle of Britain clasp
Air Crew Europe Star with Atlantic clasp
Defence Medal
War Medal 1939–1945
Queen's Commendation for Valuable Service
Czechoslovak War Cross 1939–1945 five times
Československá medaile Za chrabrost před nepřítelem ("Bravery in Face of the Enemy")
Československá medaile za zásluhy, 1. stupně ("Medal of Merit, First Class")
Pamětní medaile československé armády v zahraničí ("Commemorative Medal of the Czechoslovak Army Abroad") with France and Great Britain bars
Československý vojenský řád Za svobodu ("Czechoslovak Military Order For Freedom") 2nd class
Order of Brotherhood and Unity (Yugoslavia)
