= No. 68 Squadron RAF =

Defunct flying squadron of the Royal Air Force

- Active: 30 Jan 1917 – 28 Jan 1919; 7 Jan 1941 – 20 Apr 1945; 1 Jan 1952 – 20 January 1959
- Country: United Kingdom
- Branch: Royal Air Force
- Type: inactive
- Role: Fighter
- Motto(s): Czech: Vždy připraven (Always ready)

Insignia
- Badge: A tawny owl's head couped
- Squadron Codes: WM (1943–1944)
- Squadron Roundel

The name No. 68 Squadron has been used for two quite different units, only one of which was strictly a unit of the Royal Air Force. "No. 68 Squadron RFC" was for a time the official British military designation for No. 2 Squadron Australian Flying Corps.

== World War I ==
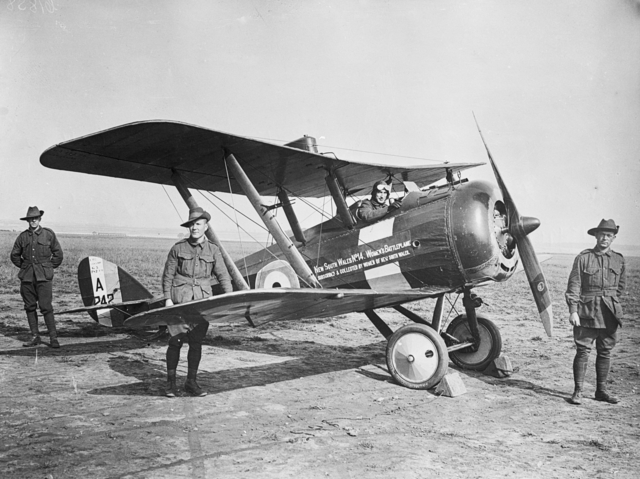
A DH.5 aeroplane of No. 2 Squadron, AFC (AKA "68 squadron RFC")

No. 2 Squadron, Australian Flying Corps was formed at Heliopolis, Egypt in 1916. For a while it was known to the British military as "No. 68 Squadron RFC" - according to some accounts in order to avoid confusion with No. 2 Squadron, RFC. This designation was never accepted by the squadron or the Australian Imperial Force, and was in fact officially dropped by the British by early 1918, before the formation of the RAF.

Initially equipped with Airco DH.5 aircraft, the unit's main role with these aircraft was the strafing of hostile trenches. In January 1918 the unit was re-equipped with S.E.5a fighters, which it retained for the rest of the war. The squadron claimed 77 enemy aircraft destroyed. It remained in Europe until 28 February 1919 when it was disbanded.

== World War II ==
During World War II, a new No. 68 squadron (the first RAF squadron to actually bear the number) was formed at RAF Catterick on 7 January 1941 as a night fighter squadron equipped with Bristol Blenheims and became operational on 7 April before moving to High Ercall. In May 1941 No. 68 converted to Bristol Beaufighters and in March 1942 it moved to RAF Coltishall in Norfolk. In July 1944 the Squadron converted to de Havilland Mosquitos.

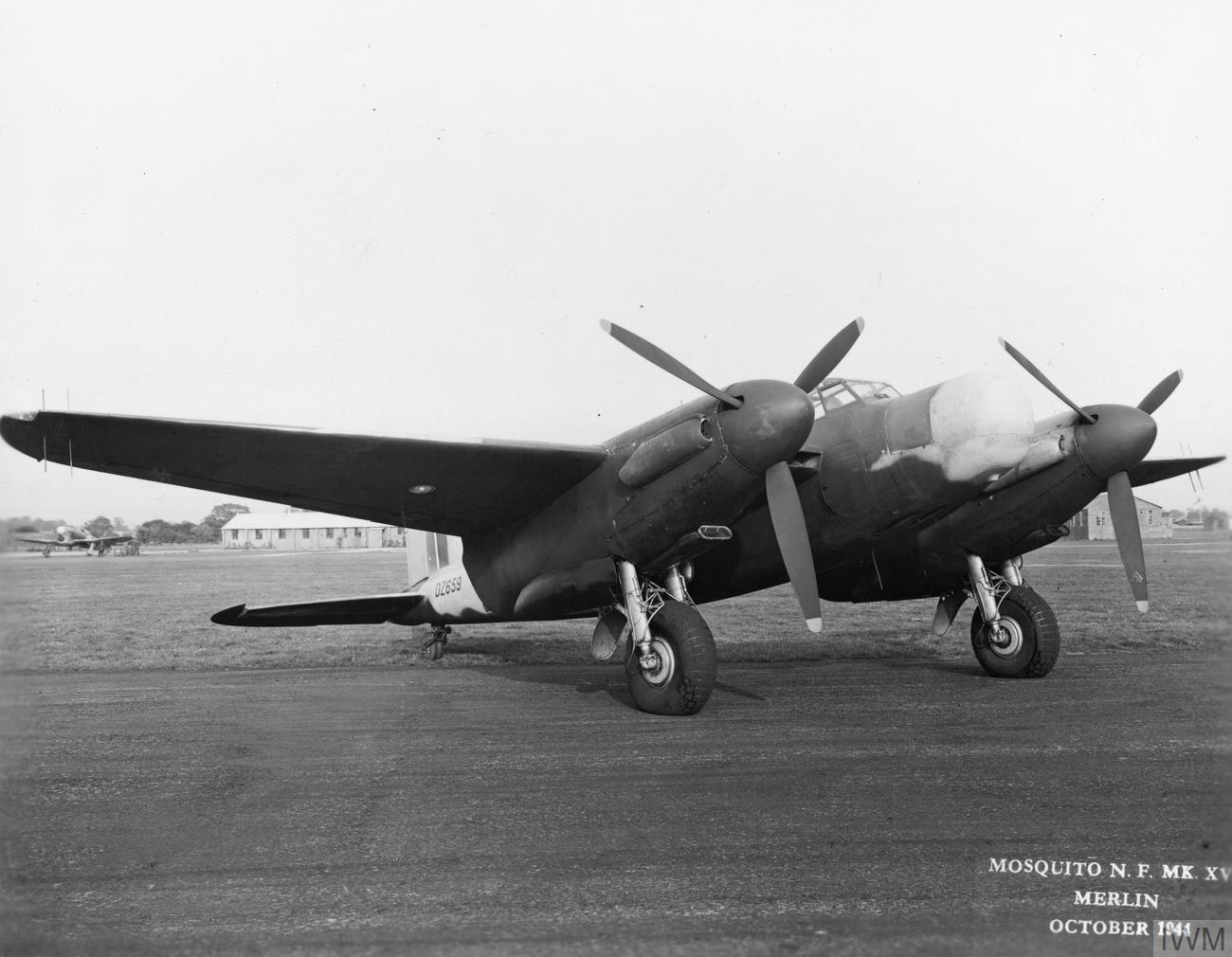
De Havilland DH.98 Mosquito NF.XVII night fighter, 1944

From July 1941 No. 68 Squadron always had a strong element of Czechoslovak airmen in exile, with up to eight flying crews consisting entirely of Czechoslovak personnel. One flight of the squadron was Czechoslovak. Notable pilots included flying ace Miloslav Mansfeld, who as a Beaufighter pilot shot down numerous Luftwaffe bombers and as a Mosquito pilot shot down two V-1 flying bombs. From October 1943 Mansfeld commanded the squadron's "A" flight.

The poet James Farrar was a Pilot Officer of 68 Squadron. On the night of 25/26 July 1944, Flt Lt Fred Kemp, with Farrar as navigator, failed to return after being directed to intercept a V-1 flying bomb over the Thames Estuary. Kemp's body was later recovered; Farrar was never found.

Both the Czechoslovak element and the squadron's night fighter service were honoured in 1944 when Air Chief Marshal Charles Steele presented a badge to the squadron that shows an owl's head and has the Czech motto Vždy připraven – "Always prepared" or "Always ready".

No. 68 Squadron was deactivated on 20 April 1945 with the personnel joining various other units including No. 125 Squadron RAF.

== 1950s ==
On 1 January 1952 the squadron was re-formed as a night-fighter unit at RAF Wahn in West Germany. It flew Gloster Meteors until renumbered as No. 5 Squadron RAF on 20 January 1959.

== See also ==
- List of Royal Air Force aircraft squadrons
