= Franz Leitner (politician) =

Austrian politician (1918–2005)

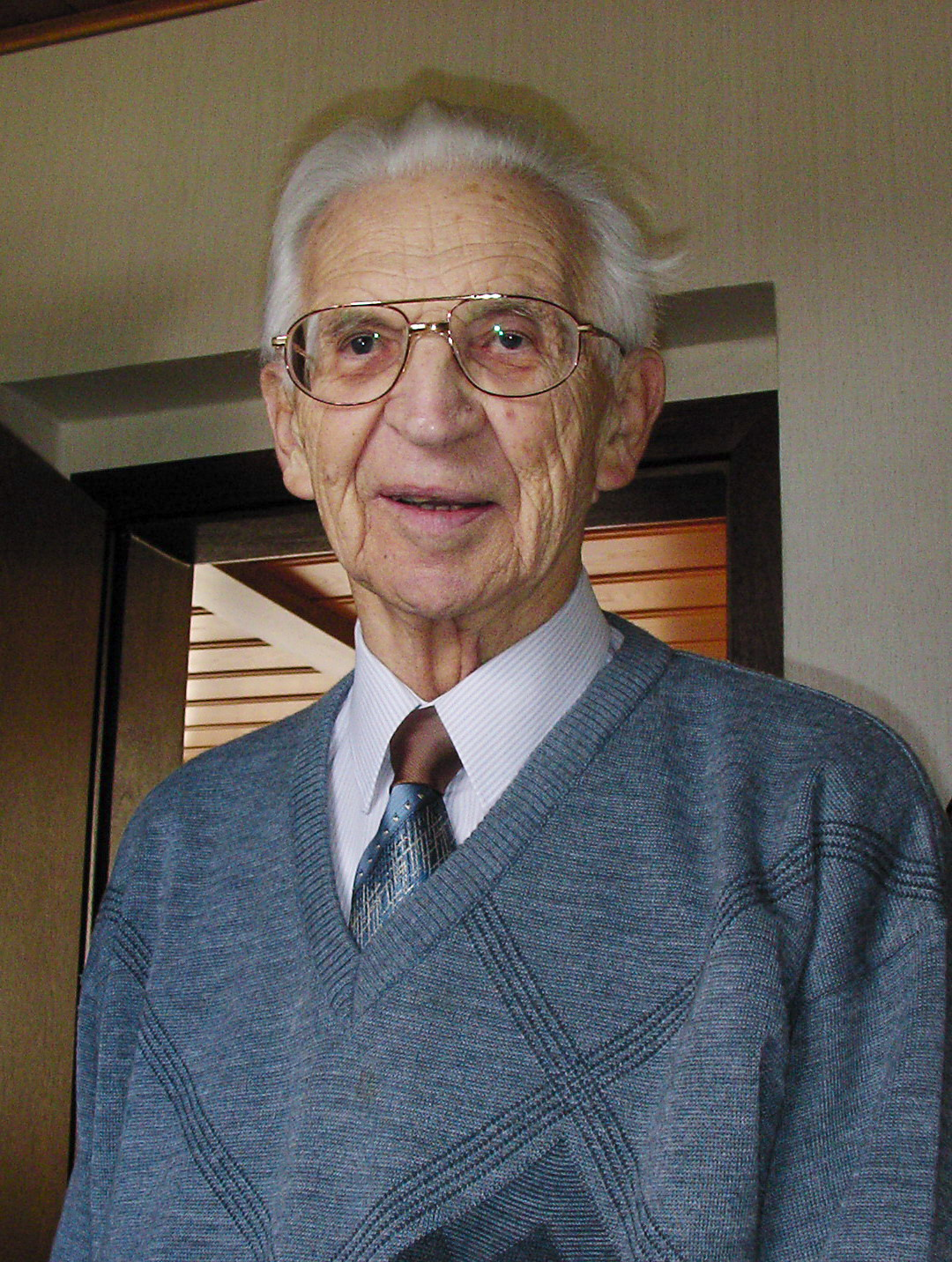
Franz Leitner in 2005

Franz Leitner (12 February 1918, Wiener Neustadt, Austria – 20 October 2005, Höf-Präbach, Styria, Austria) was an Austrian politician and honoured as an "Austrian Righteous Among the Nations”.

He was member of the Styrian Landtag (state parliament) and leader of the Austrian Communist Party in Styria.
