= Edeltrud Becher =

Austrian Righteous Among the Nations (1916–2016)

- Born: 4 June 1916; Vienna, Austria-Hungary
- Died: 23 July 2016 (aged 100); Vienna, Austria
- Education: Academy of Fine Arts Vienna; University of Applied Arts Vienna
- Known for: Hiding Jews from the Nazis during World War II
- Spouse: Walter Posiles (married 1947–1966)
- Honours: Righteous Among the Nations (1978)

Edeltrud Becher (married Posiles; 4 June 1916 – 23 July 2016) was an Austrian woman who kept her partner, a Czech Jew, hidden from the Nazis during World War II. In recognition of her actions, she was recognised as Righteous Among the Nations in 1978.

== Early life and education ==
Becher was born on 4 June 1916 into a middle-class family in Vienna; her father was a merchant, while her mother was a housewife. Becher had a younger sister, Charlotte (1918–2003). Becher attended a Realgymnasium, but was forced to drop out of school after her family's financial situation worsened during the Great Depression. While her parents had wanted her to become an interior designer, Becher had aspired to attend drama school to become an actress; however, she later decided to study art history and sculpture instead.

== Relationship with Walter Posiles ==
In either 1935 or 1937, Becher met Walter Posiles, a Czech national living in Austria, at the Café Museum in Vienna. Walter was Jewish, 19 years older than Posiles, and ran a wholesale wine business in Vienna. In 1938, the couple became engaged, but their marriage was prohibited by the Nuremberg Laws, which prohibited relationships between Germans and Jews. In March 1938, following the Anschluss wherein Germany annexed Austria, Posiles fled Vienna, first travelling to Brastislava in his native Czechoslovakia before travelling on to Prague. The couple continued their relationship despite the geographic separation; Posiles illegally entered into Austria several times to meet Becher, while Becher travelled to Bratislava to see him.

In either 1938 or 1939, Becher was denounced for "racial defilement". With Posiles' help, she was able to flee Vienna to stay with his sister Grete in Hungary. Friedericke Buchegger, a friend of Posiles who had contacts in the Gestapo, was able to arrange for the destruction of Becher's criminal file. In either 1940 or 1941, Becher returned to Vienna. Posiles secretly visited her twice in Vienna, with the support of Becher's aunts, Lydia Matouschek and Olga Holstein.

== Hiding of the Posiles brothers ==
In July 1942, Posiles, alongside his brothers Hans and Ludwig, received deportation orders to the Theresienstadt Ghetto. The brothers faked their deaths by leaving suicide notes, and took a night train to Vienna, where they were initially sheltered by Becher and her sister Charlotte in the home of Charlotte's fiancé, Friedrich Kuntz, at Neustiftgasse 33 in Neubau. When Kuntz, a soldier, was on leave, the brothers were moved to alternate accommodation. Becher was able to retouch inactive food stamps to secure food for the men, in addition to using her own. She was also supported to shelter the men by other sympathetic Austrians, including Alois and Josephine Kreiner.

In April 1942, Posiles contracted pneumonia and pleurisy. With the help of her sister Charlotte, Becher was able to contact a Jewish doctor, Ernst Pick, who subsequently treated Posiles. Shortly afterwards, Becher contracted scarlet fever, requiring hospitalisation. During this time, Charlotte took over caring for the Posiles brothers in addition to her own baby.

Becher was able to forge Posiles an identity card, that he was able to use at roadside checkpoints. The card used the identity of an artist friend of Becher's aunt, Lydia Matouschek, who had died in 1940 and whose passport Matouschek had kept; like Posiles, he had been Czechoslovak and so exempt from military service. With the card, Posiles was able to travel freely around Vienna. Shortly before the end of the war, Becher and Posiles stayed at the home of a Nazi follower (though not a member) at a villa in Perchtoldsdorf, where they stayed until the end of the war.

== Resistance to the Nazis ==
While Becher was for a time able to avoid joining the Reich Labour Service, she eventually was made to register with Pervesler, an electrical company in Neubau that manufactured headlights for tanks. Through sabotage, Becher was at times able to delay production at the company. She wrote and published anti-Nazi leaflets, often using satire, with her sister and the Posiles brothers, which they affixed across Vienna, including on windows and fire hydrants. Becher was also known to have carried out other acts of sabotage, including scattering pins on roads used for the war effort, and cutting Wehrmacht telephone lines in Baden bei Wien.

== Postwar period ==
Following the end of World War II, Becher and Posiles married in Vienna in 1947. Becher initially worked for her husband's wine business, but in 1946 began studying sculpture at the Academy of Fine Arts Vienna, where she was taught by Fritz Wotruba and Herbert Boeckl. During the late 1950s, she studied at the University of Applied Arts Vienna. In either 1962 or 1966, Becher and Posiles divorced, though they remained on friendly terms. From 1967, Becher worked as a secretary for the International Civil Service, later working as a librarian at the Vienna Municipal Libraries until 1984. Becher retired in 1985, after which she studied for a master's degree in art history and archaeology. At the age of 92, she travelled independently to India and Nepal to see the Himalayas.

After the war, Becher lived for many years in Rudolfsheim-Fünfhaus. From 2010, she lived at Maimonides-Zentrum, a Jewish retirement home in Leopoldstadt. At the time of her death, Becher was one of the last surviving Righteous Among the Nations from Austria. Becher died on 23 July 2016, and is buried at Vienna Central Cemetery.

== Recognition ==
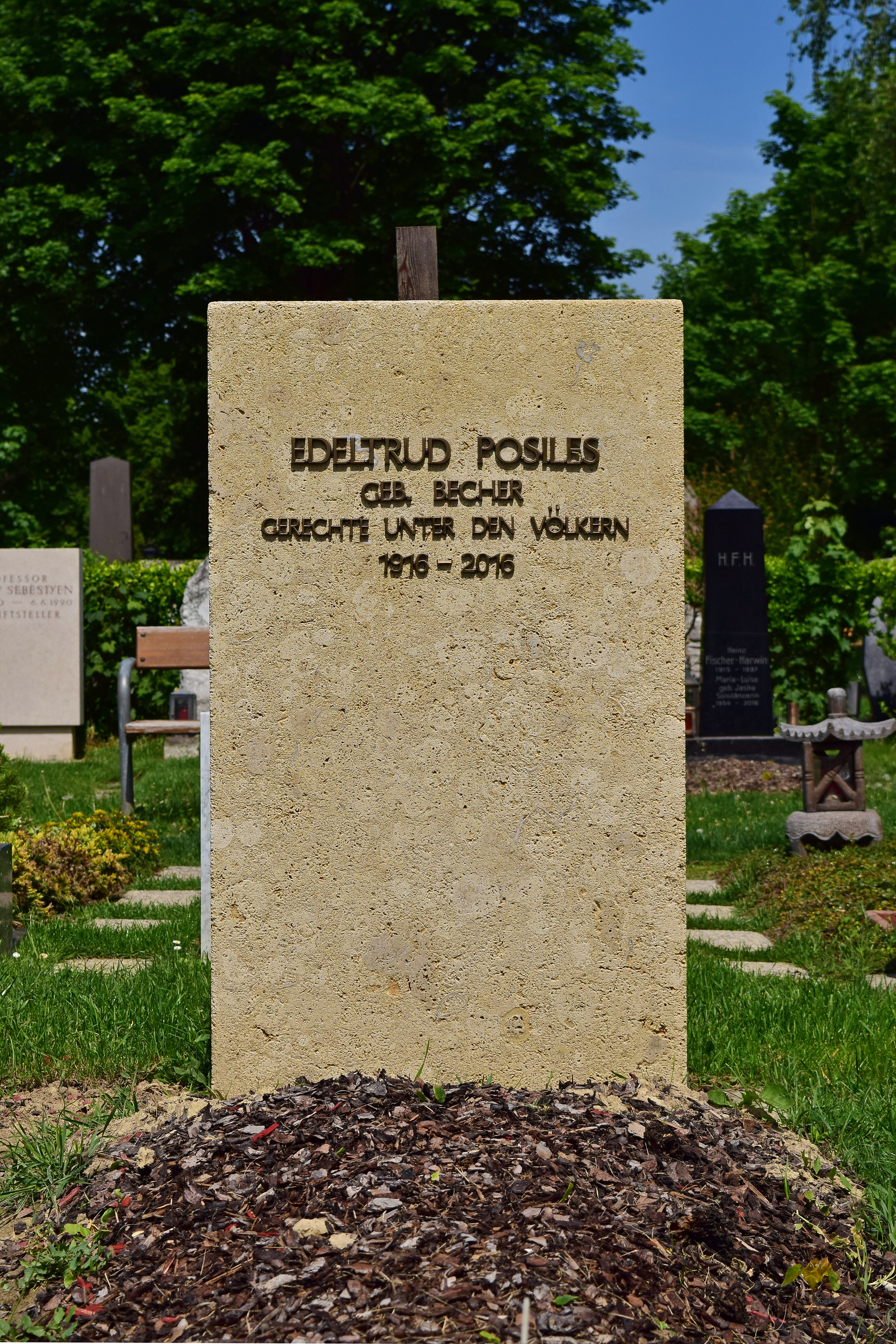
Becher's grave in Vienna Central Cemetery

Becher was one of among 3, 400 Austrians who helped and supported Jews from Nazi persecution. Aware of the risks that came from sheltering Posiles, Becher always carried a vial of cyanide with the plan that if she were to be arrested she would die by suicide. The period of time Becher supported the Posiles brothers was between 1942 and 1945; she was able to build a network of friends and family members who assisted her, with her later stating a total of 12 people assisted her in protecting the Posiles.

On 26 October 1978, Becher received the title Righetous Among the Nations from Yad Vashem, Israel's official memorial to victims of the Holocaust.

From the 1980s, Becher regularly appeared in the Austrian and German media as an eyewitness of the Holocaust. In 2005, Österreichischer Rundfunk broadcast a film, Die Sterne verlöschen nicht (lit. 'The stars do not go out'), directed by Helene Maimann, which detailed Becher's life.

In 2010, Becher donated her personal records, including photos and documents relating to her family as well as the Posiles family, as well as some of her artwork, to the Vienna State and City Archives. To mark her 95th birthday, an exhibition of her life was held in Vienna in 2011.
