= Sonja Buchegger =

Computer scientist

Sonja Buchegger is a computer scientist specializing in peer-to-peer networking, reputation systems in wireless ad hoc networks, and confidential computing. Born in Austria, and educated in Austria and Switzerland, she has worked in the US, Germany, and Sweden. She is a professor of computer science at the KTH Royal Institute of Technology in Stockholm, Sweden.

== Early life and education ==
Buchegger was born in Schwarzach, in Austria. She became an undergraduate at the University of Klagenfurt in Austria, where she studied business administration and computer science, earning two bachelor's degrees in 1995 and 1996 respectively. She continued at Klagenfurt for a master's degree in computer science in 1999.

In 2004, she completed a PhD in communication systems from the École Polytechnique Fédérale de Lausanne in Switzerland. Her doctoral dissertation, Coping with Misbehavior in Mobile Ad-hoc Networks, was supervised by Jean-Yves Le Boudec.

== Career ==
She became a postdoctoral researcher at the University of California, Berkeley from 2005 to 2006, and then worked in industry for Telekom Innovation Laboratories from 2007 to 2009, before taking a position as associate professor at KTH. She was installed as a full professor at KTH in 2019.
