= David M. Crowe =

American historian

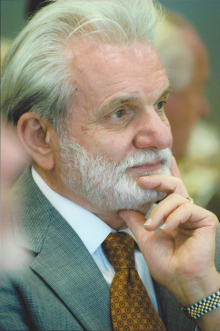
David M. Crowe in 2014

David M. Crowe, Jr. (born September 20, 1943) is a Presidential Fellow at Chapman University and Professor Emeritus of History and Law at Elon University. He is a specialist in international criminal law, the Holocaust, the history of the Romani people in Eastern Europe and Russia, and 20th century China. He has served as an expert witness in court cases in the United States and Canada, and testified before the U.S. Congress’ Commission on Security and Cooperation in Europe and the New York City Council’s Committee on Immigration. His numerous books have been translated into six languages.

== Academic career ==
Crowe began his career as a Russian specialist at the National Archives of the United States in 1974, where he worked with Soviet officials who were seeking the return of Russian embassy and consular records seized by the U.S. after the Bolsheviks took power in late 1917. The following year he joined a special team of archivists in the Department of Defense that worked with the U.S. Senate's Church Committee investigation of the U.S. intelligence community. This group also handled new Freedom of Information Act and other requests related to the Vietnam War and other topics. Crowe returned to the National Archives in early 1977 as liaison to the Central Intelligence Agency.

Later that year, Crowe accepted a teaching position at Elon University, where he taught the history of the Holocaust, Nazi Germany, and modern Chinese history. In 2006, he was appointed professor of legal history at Elon’s School of Law, where he taught courses on international criminal law and international criminal tribunals. Crowe also taught at Central European University in Budapest, Hungary and has lectured at the University of Heidelberg, Germany; the Graduate Institute of International and Development Studies in Geneva, Switzerland; and the University of Bucharest, Romania.

== Academic leadership ==
Crowe was a visiting scholar at the Harriman Institute at Columbia University from 1998 to 2001, and a Fellow at the Center for Slavic, Eurasian, and East European Studies at the University of North Carolina at Chapel Hill from 1997 to 2006. He was president of the Association for the Study of Nationalities from 1998 to 2004, and a member of the education committee of the United States Holocaust Memorial Museum from 1990 to 2004. He was also a member of the North Carolina Council on the Holocaust and served as its chair from 1995 to 1999.

== Consulting and legal work ==
Crowe has been a consultant to the United States Agency for International Development of the Rule of Law/Global Rights Initiative, Central European University’s Research Scheme in Prague, the Open Society Institute’s Roma Cultural Initiative, and the DiploFoundation’s Roma Diplomacy Project.

Over the past 20 years, he has served as an expert witness in the United States, Canada, and Israel on cases dealing principally with asylum and extradition issues. He also organized the Conference on International Law: War Crimes, Human Rights, and Immigration at Elon University’s School of Law in 2012. He took part in the Silberman Seminar for Law School Professors, The Impact and Legacy of the Holocaust on the Law, at the United States Holocaust Memorial Museum in Washington, D.C. from June 4–15, 2007.

== Grants and awards ==
Over the years, Crowe has been the recipient or co-recipient of grants from the American Council of Learned Societies, the U.S. Department of Education, the Rockefeller Foundation, the National Endowment for the Humanities .

In 1994 the Association for the Advancement of Baltic Studies awarded Crowe it's V. Stanley Vardys President's Prize for Books on Baltic Studies for his The Baltic States and the Great Powers: Foreign Relations, 1938–1940. In 2010 he received the Southern Conference on Slavic Studies’ Richard Stites Senior Scholar Award for Contributions to the Field of Slavic Studies.

== Publications ==
=== Books ===
Crowe’s books have dealt with a variety of subjects ranging from the evolution of international criminal law, the history of national and international criminal tribunals, the Holocaust, 19th and 20th century China, international relations in Central and Eastern Europe, and the history of the Roma in Eastern Europe and Russia.

Choice: Current Reviews for Academic Libraries selected Crowe’s The Holocaust: Roots, History, and Aftermath (2008) as an Outstanding Academic Title for 2008,

Elie Wiesel told The New York Times that Crowe’s biography of Oskar Schindler, the Righteous Gentile made famous in Steven Spielberg’s Schindler’s List, added complexity to the film without “’even altering the story.’” The result, he continued, was that Oskar Schindler: The Untold Story of His Life, Wartime Activities, and the True Story Behind the List (2004; 2007), “’made Schindler more human, and also more extraordinary.’” The book was later chosen as a selection of the History Book Club.

The Washington Post called Crowe’s principal book on the Roma, A History of the Gypsies of Eastern Europe and Russia (1998), “the most comprehensive and indispensable of its kind in English.” Ian Hancock said it was “remarkably thorough and compassionate,” while a reviewer in Ethnic and Racial Studies wrote that it was a “clearly first rate” study that was “impeccably researched, extremely informational and well written. Most importantly, Crowe’s volume fills an obvious and long-standing void in the literature.” It was also chosen as a selection of the History Book Club. In 2007, an updated, second edition of The History of the Gypsies of Eastern Europe and Russia was published, with a new chapter on the history of the Roma in each country discussed in the first edition, plus the new states that had emerged from the former communist nations in Eastern Europe and the Soviet Union.

Crowe’s other books include:

- War Crimes, Genocide, and Justice: A Global History (2014).
- Germany and China: Transnational Encounters since the 18th Century (2014; co-edited with Joanne Cho)
- Crimes of State, Past and Present: Government-Sponsored Atrocities and International Legal Responses (2011; editor)
- The Baltic States and the Great Powers, 1938–1940 (1992)
- The Gypsies of Eastern Europe (1991; co-edited with John Kolsti)

=== Books: foreign editions ===
Da tu-sha gen-yuan li-shi yu yubo [The Holocaust: Roots, History and Aftermath] (Shanghai: Shanghai People’s Publishing House, 2015)

Oskar Schindler: Prawdziwa historia [Oskar Schindler; The True Story] (Warsaw: Proszynski I S-ka, 2015)

Oskar Schindler: De biografie en het ware verhaal achter de “Schindlerlijst [The Biography and True Story behind Schindler’s List] (Amsterdam: Uitgeverj Verbum, 2006)

Oskar Schindler: Die Biografie [Oskar Schindler: The Biography] (Berlin: Eichborn, 2005)

Istoriya Tsigan Skhidnoi Evropi ta Rosii [A History of the Gypsies of Eastern Europe and Russia] (Kyiv: Vidavinstvo “Megataip, 2003)

Gipushi no Rekishi Tohoh Roshia no Roma Minzoku [A History of the Gypsies of Eastern Europe and Russia] (Tokyo: Kyodotsushimsha, 2001)

=== Current scholarly projects ===
Crowe is also writing a biography of Raphael Lemkin and editing a book on the evolution of Soviet law and justice in the 1920s and 1930s, and its impact on the Soviet role at the Nuremberg IMT trial. He is also researching a biography on Pearl S. Buck.

== Media ==
Articles on Crowe's books and research have appeared in The New York Times, Macleans, Pravda, the Times Literary Supplement, The International Jerusalem Post, Dziennik Polski, Pravo, Die Berliner Literaturkritik, Der Spiegel, Stuttgartner Zeitung, Der Taggespiegel, and Wprost, among others.
