= Reinhold Duschka =

Austrian honored by Israel for actions during WWII

Reinhold Duschka (1900-1993) was an Austrian iron worker who from 1939 until April 1945 hid the Jewish Chemist Regina Kraus and her 10-year-old daughter Lucia (later Lucia Heilman) from the National Socialist regime. In 1990, he was awarded the title of Righteous Among the Nations by Yad Vashem for his actions.

== Life ==
In the 1920s, Duschka worked as an iron worker out of a workshop in Mollardgasse in the 6th district of Vienna, Austria. He became friendly with Rudi Kraus and Regine Hildebrandt, who married and had a daughter in 1929, called Lucia.

Shortly after the Anschluss in 1938, Regina and her daughter Lucia attempted to follow her husband to Iran, where he had been working as an engineer. They were unable to obtain transit papers, nor did they have the money for passage by ship. In 1939, their apartment was confiscated by the National Socialist regime as part of widespread confiscations of Jewish property.

Duschka offered to shelter them in his workshop in full knowledge that he was putting his own life in danger. He cared for the two fugitives throughout the war, regularly providing food and clothing which he bought on the black market. Duschka also managed to provide school books for Lucia, so her mother could give her lessons. By observing Duschka, Regine and Lucia learnt how to work with metal and assisted him with his daily tasks.

In 1944, the workshop was heavily damaged in an Allied bombing raid. Regina and Lucia were lucky to survive but had to leave the building. Duschka found them alternative accommodation in a summer house in Hütteldorf, where they stayed hidden until the end of the war. He explained to his neighbours that they were relatives from Germany.

After the war, Duschka rebuilt his workshop and continued his work there until his retirement. On 7 March 1990 he was awarded the honorific "Righteous Among the Nations". In April 2013 a sign commemorating Duschka's actions was installed on the facade.

In 2018, Austrian novelist Erich Hackl published the novel Am Seil based on Duschka's story.
