= Balthasar Linsinger =

Austrian priest

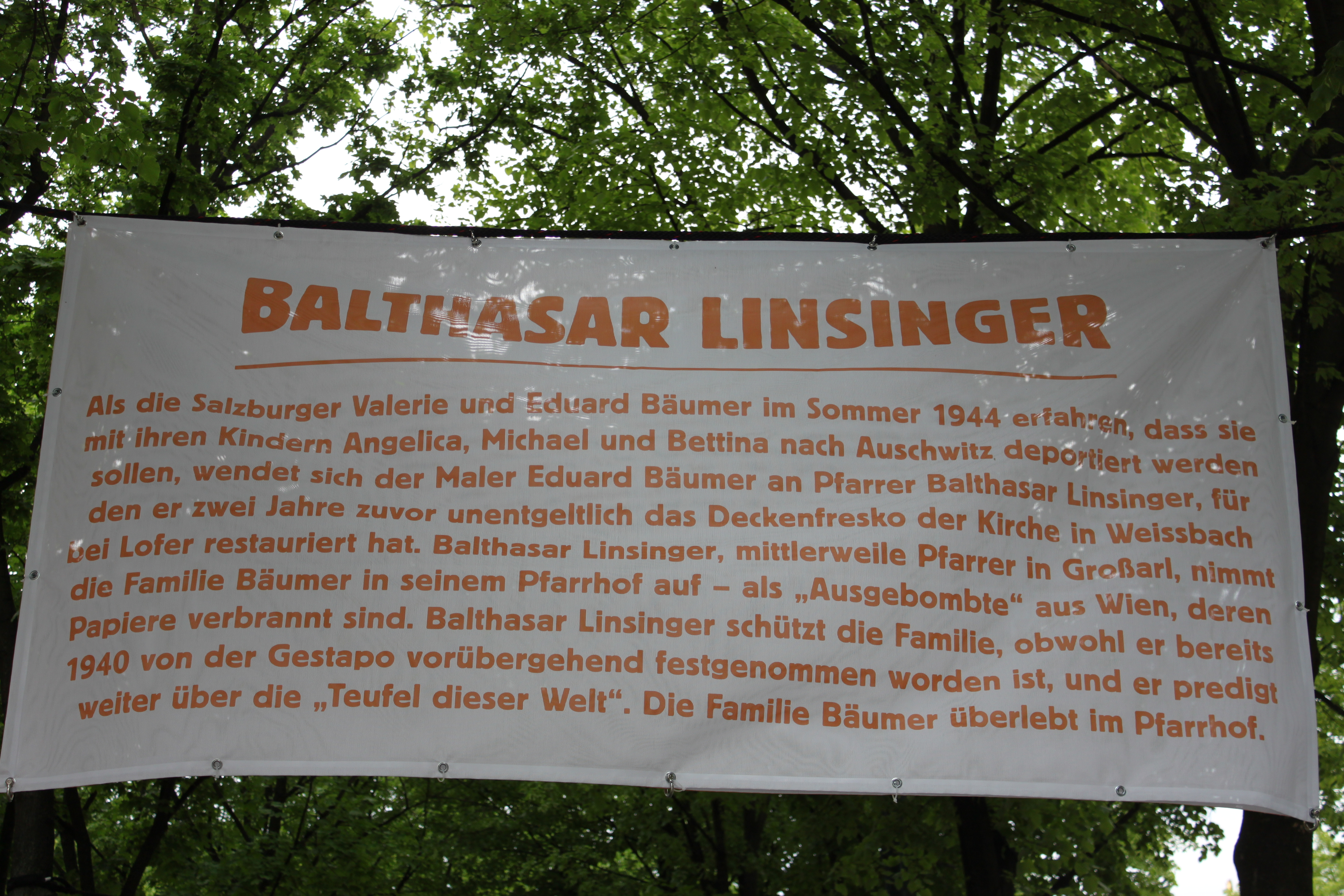

Balthasar Linsinger (1902 – 19 October 1986) was an Austrian priest.

== Life ==
Linsinger was born in 1902 in Sankt Veit im Pongau. He was a pastor in Großarl and offered a Jewish family from the city Salzburg to come to Großarl in the case of danger. In 1944 when a deportation was imminent, the family immersed to his home. Linsinger impersonated the family as a family which lost their home in Vienna, because of the bombing war. No denunciation happened and the family survived the era of National Socialism.

On 13 April 2011, Linsinger was added to the list of Righteous Among the Nations. The tribute was initiated by the Viennese journalist Angelica Bäumer. She was one of three children of the Jewish artist Eduard Bäumer, who Linsinger accommodated in the presbytery including his wife and the three children at the ages of three, nine and twelve.

Linsinger was ordained a priest in 1925. The stages of his priestly life as a pastor were: Weißbach bei Lofer (1937–1943), Großarl (1943–1954) and from 1954 until his retirement Sankt Michael im Lungau. He died in 1986 in Tamsweg.
