= Danuta Kleisinger =

Polish Righteous Among the Nations

- Born: Danuta Czlapinska; May 29, 1924; Bydgoszcz, Poznań Voivodeship, Second Polish Republic
- Died: August 27, 2017 (aged 93)
- Known for: Righteous Among the Nations
- Spouse: Ewald Kleisinger

Danuta Kleisinger (born Danuta Czlapinska; May 29, 1924 in Bydgoszcz– 27 August 2017) was an Austrian Righteous Among the Nations and an honorary Israeli citizen.

== WWII ==
In 1942 the Polish Jew Jusek Prezman was with his mother Scheine in the Warsaw Ghetto. Before the war, Danuta's mother was a friend of Scheine Prezman and Jusek was a friend of Danuta. After the establishment of the ghetto, Danuta smuggled food and money for the Prezman family into the ghetto and therewith endangered their lives. Danuta's fiancé Ewald Kleisinger served after the occupation of Poland as an officer in the German Wehrmacht at the railway station in Warsaw. With Ewald's assistance, Danuta provided Jusek and Josef with falsified Aryan papers and driver's permits. Before the ghetto uprising and its destruction in April 1943 Jusek Prezman and his friend Joseph Kormarzyn fled with the help of Kleisinger to the Aryan side of the city. Danuta hid them with the knowledge and consent of her fiancé, the officer Ewald Kleisinger, three weeks in her apartment. She also saved the mother of Jusek, Scheine Prezman. After that Jusek and Josef stayed at the home of Ewald's parents in Vienna. They were disguised as Polish Christian agricultural workers. Provided with food and other essentials, they lived as members of the Kleisinger family until the end of the war.

Ewald Kleisinger also is an Austrian Righteous Among the Nations.
