= Luci Pollreis =

Austrian woman

Luci Pollreis (also spelled Lucia Pollreiss) was an Austrian woman who was recognized as Righteous among the Nations for saving three Jews hiding from the Gestapo in Vienna during World War II.

The young Viennese woman hid two Jewish women and one man in her apartment in Vienna, on her farm and in a country house in Ramsau near Hainfeld for three years beginning in 1942.

They were a couple, Max and Johanna Arnold and Max's sister, Leopoldine Stern. Max had been ordered by the Gestapo, to move from Pressbaum, where he lived, to Vienna. He had been commissioned to register at the Jewish community. As he desisted, he was arrested on suspicion of Rassenschande and taken to the regional court II, where he remained imprisoned for six weeks. After his release he went underground. He met his future wife Johanna. She asked an acquaintance to help him and his sister Leopoldine.

One day this friend turned to Luci Pollreis, who lived alone since her husband was drafted into the Wehrmacht. Would she be ready to accept and hide three Jews, who are threatened to be arrested by the Gestapo? Luci Pollreis immediately gave a positive response and coordinated hiding places with Maria Schauer, who hid the Jews in the fall, winter and spring months.

Luci was a dressmaker, and Max, a tailor, helped her at work. Again and again members of the Gestapo appeared and were searching for the missing Jews. In the night she often took the three from her home to the factory, her country house or to friends. Max and Johanna Arnold and Leopoldine Stern all survived the war.

== Recognition ==
On 8 July 1982, Yad Vashem recognized both Maria Schauer and Lucia Pollreis as Righteous Among the Nations, which is recognition given to "non-Jews who took great risks to save Jews during the Holocaust."
