= Edi Stecher =

Edi Stecher is a Viennese Righteous among the Nations. He received this honorary title in 1984 for harbouring the Jewish woman Melvine Deutsch.

Deutsch was in a camp of forced labors of the Siemens company in Vienna. When she was deported to the Mauthausen-Gusen concentration camp, she fled from the train and came to Vienna, where she received help from Anna Manzer.

The Gestapo did not give up finding Melvine Deutsch. When she was in danger at Manzer's place, she went to her brother Edi Stecher, where she stayed several months hidden from the Gestapo.

Stecher and Manzer did not have enough allotted food, after they harboured Deutsch, and received help from their parents, in whose apartment she was also brought from times to times, when the Gestapo searched the district. Deutsch safely left the apartment after the liberation.

The parents Ludwig and Anna Friessnegg and the sister Anna Manzer are Austrian Righteous among the Nations as well.
