= Leo Tschoell =

Dr. Leo Tschoell (born 1893) has been awarded the title “Righteous Among the Nations.”

After the annexation of Austria to Germany in 1938 he immigrated to Yugoslavia and established his own business in Belgrade. After the occupation of Yugoslavia in 1941 he fled to Hungary and founded a new firm in Budapest.

In 1944 the situation of the Hungarian Jews started to worsen. In this year the national socialistic “Arrow Cross Party- Hungarian Movement” which supported the deportation of Jews came into power. Tschoell provided a hideout on his property in Gödöllő for numerous Jews who asked for his help.

Later he started to print hundreds of fake documents in his printing shop, founded an antifascist underground organisation, provided a hideout for more and more people, and saved their lives by providing them fake IDs.

In 1968 he received the title “Righteous Among the Nations” from the Yad Vashem remembrance authority in Jerusalem.

== Sources ==
- Righteous among the Nations
- Leo Tschoell – his activity to save Jews' lives during the Holocaust, at Yad Vashem website
