= Charlotte Fritz =

Austrian Righteous Among the Nations

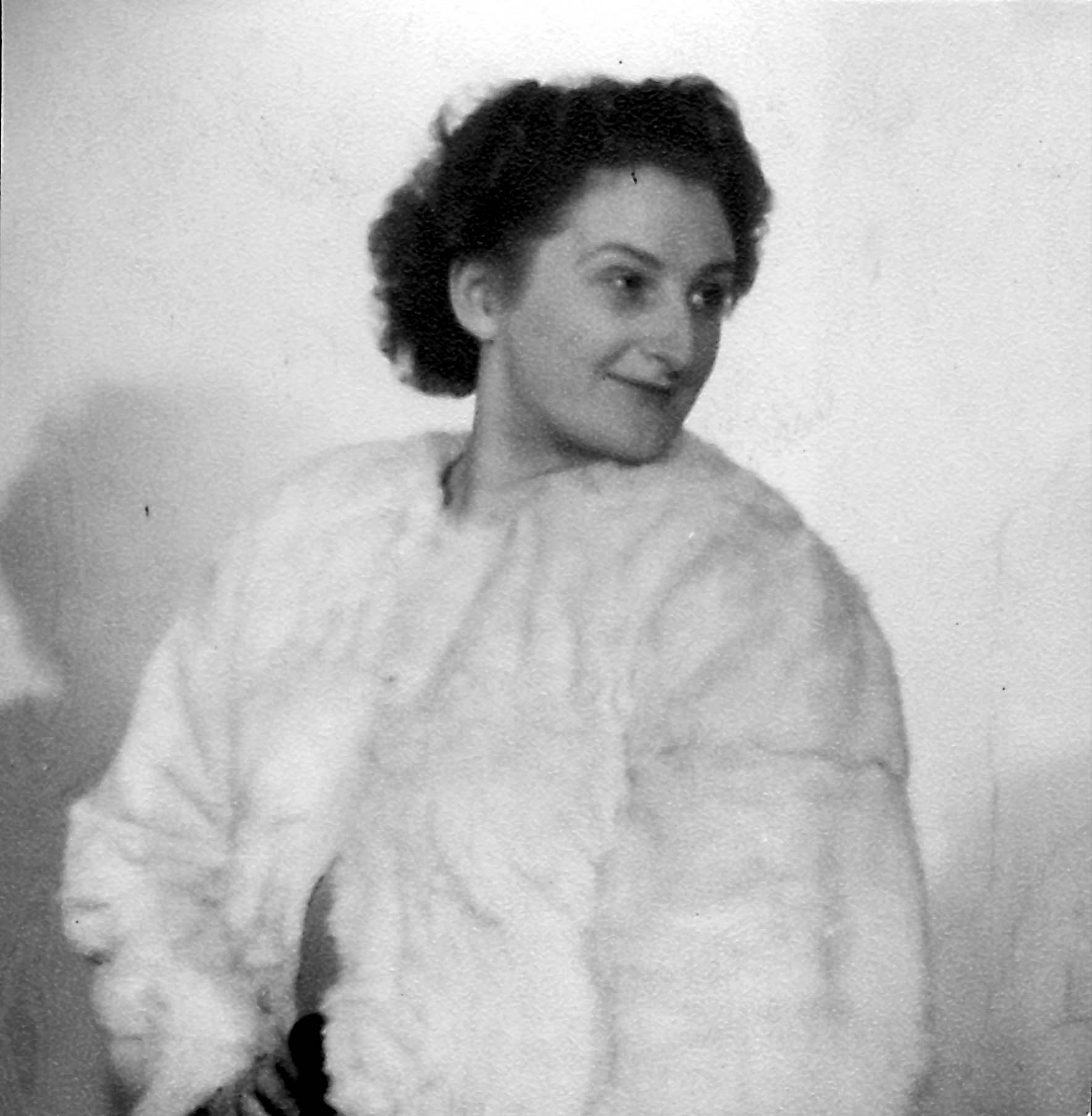
- Charlotte Fritz, 1943
- Born: 4 July 1918; Baden bei Wien
- Died: 23 September 2003 (aged 85); Vienna
- Citizenship: Austrian
- Relatives: Edeltrud Becher

Charlotte Fritz (née Becher; 4 July 1918 in Baden bei Wien – 23 September 2003 in Vienna) was an Austrian Righteous Among the Nations.

She lived together with her sister Edeltrud Becher who was engaged to a Jew. When two executives of the Gestapo showed up and asked for Edeltrud's fiancé, Charlotte denied any presence of the man who lived with his brothers in Prague at that time. When the brothers of Edeltrud's fiancé came from Prague to Vienna, Charlotte was able to convince an officer at the Vienna Police Department to destroy the file that incriminated Edeltrud's fiancé. Furthermore, Charlotte organized shelters in Vienna for the brothers.
