= Anna-Maria Haas =

Austrian Righteous Among the Nations (1909–1996)

- Born: Anna-Maria Francl; March 9, 1909; Vienna, Austria
- Died: 1996 (aged 86–87); Vienna, Austria
- Known for: Righteous Among the Nations
- Spouse: Benno Haas

Anna-Maria Haas (March 9, 1909 – 1996) was an Austrian woman, who on May 3, 1982, was distinguished by Yad Vashem as Righteous Among the Nations for protecting Jews during World War II.

== Rescuer ==
Anna-Maria Francl was born in Vienna. She married Benno Haas in 1930 and lived in Vienna. He was of Jewish descent and came from a family of Jewish industrialists who had converted to Catholicism. However, when Germany took control of Vienna in 1938, the young man fled the country for England where he joined the army to fight against the Axis powers.

Anna-Maria, who was not Jewish, remained in Vienna and attracted unwanted attention from the Gestapo because of her husband's Jewish connections and role in the British army. Still, she decided she would help Jews in Vienna who were struggling to avoid discovery and deportation.

=== Rubin-Bittman family ===
Haas is best remembered for her support of Josef and Sidonie Rubin-Bittman over several years during the war. Haas lived in the 9th district and was friends with Josef and Sidonie who lived in the same neighborhood. Sidonie was a relative of Martin Buber from Lemberg. After the family abandoned their flat in 1939 and went underground to avoid deportation, they had to live in disguise, and they often had to change their hiding places. In 1944, while Josef and Sidonie hid in the cellar of a house, Sidonie gave birth to her first son Fritz. Anna-Maria visited them often in their hiding places and brought them groceries, baby food and milk.

A simplified version of the medal awarded to those who are named Righteous Among the Nations.

Although Josef lived in disguise and worked under heavy and dangerous conditions, he tried to help Hungarian Jews who had already been selected by the Gestapo for deportation to an Extermination camp. He also began a relief operation for a Jewish child camp in Ferdinandstrasse in the 2nd district. Haas also supplied him with food and medication for the children's camp.

=== After the war ===
Josef and Sidonie survived the war, and Josef became a successful businessman. Sidonie died in 1968 after a long illness and Josef died on April 25, 1972, at the age of 75.

Anna-Maria Haas died in Vienna in 1996.

== Recognition ==
On May 3, 1982, Yad Vashem recognized Haas as Righteous Among the Nations, which is recognition given to "non-Jews who took great risks to save Jews during the Holocaust."
