= Maria Schauer =

A simplified version of the medal awarded to those who are named Righteous Among the Nations.

Maria Schauer was an Austrian recognized by Yad Vashem as a Righteous Among the Nations, after rescuing three Jews from deportation and possible death after Nazi occupation of Austria during World War II.

== Rescuer ==
Schauer was living in Vienna when Nazi Germany took control of the city in 1938 and began persecuting Jews there.

Max Arnold who was a Jewish tailor living in the Pressbaum district, outside Vienna, Austria, received a message in 1942 from the Nazi authorities saying that he was required to move to Vienna and register at the offices of the Jewish community. Max did move to Vienna but chose not to register as required. While in Vienna, Arnold married his partner, Johanna. When the city-wide order was given to deport the Jews from Vienna, the couple chose instead to hide in the city along with Max's sister, Leopoldine Stern. They turned to Luci Pollreis (also spelled Lucia Pollreiss), a seamstress and businesswoman, who agreed to hire Max Arnold as a tailor, and help the three find a safe sanctuary. The three Jews moved between hiding places in Vienna from 1942 until the end of the war in 1945.

From September to April of each year, the three Jews hid successfully in Maria Schauer's home, but it was impossible for them to stay there during the summer months because of the presence of Schauer's regular house guest, who was a prominent Nazi. So, in the summertime, the refugees stayed with Pollreiss, who not only gave them a place to stay, but also supported them financially. Pollreiss’ husband, who served in the German army and only lived at home on vacations, demanded that she stop helping the Jews, but, despite his arguments, Pollreiss continued.

One day while the Jews were hiding in Schauer’s home, the authorities arrived at the door, and asked if anyone else lived in the house with Schauer. She "answered in the negative, and her denial, spoken with confidence, convinced them not to check."

Pollreiss and Schauer endangered themselves by hiding Jews, a crime that could have led to deportation to a concentration camp, and eventually to death. Neither woman received compensation for their activities, "on the contrary, they shared their own food and clothing with the Jews, during a period of scarcity." Schauer and the Arnold family all survived the war.

== Recognition ==
On 8 July 1982, Yad Vashem recognized both Schauer and Pollreiss as Righteous Among the Nations, which is recognition given to "non-Jews who took great risks to save Jews during the Holocaust."
