= Maria Böhm =

Maria Böhm was an Austrian who helped hide a Jew from the Gestapo for years, and was awarded the title Righteous Among the Nations.

== Life ==
Böhm lived in the 12th district, in Theergasse 12, access 5 in Vienna when she was approached by Rosalia Wasserstein.

Wasserstein's father had been deported in 1939 and on May 19, 1942, Rosalia's mother and all the Jewish residents of the house were roughly herded onto a truck by the Gestapo, but Rosalia, who worked as a seamstress and her sister, who worked at night, were not there at the time. Rosalia turned to the Israelitische Kultusgemeinde and learned that her mother had been deported to Theresienstadt, in Czechoslovakia. Rosalia was told to report to Sperlgasse for deportation to Poland, but she chose not to do that. Instead, she turned to a friend to ask for help finding a hiding place in the city.

That friend, Franziska Cechal, lived with her four-year-old daughter in a small apartment in Vienna in 1942 and strongly disapproved of Nazism. She agreed to hide Wasserstein in her own apartment, supplying all her needs. From time to time, Wasserstein was transferred to the homes of Anna Kuchar and Maria Böhm for safety. By moving from house to house as necessary, Wasserstein survived the war in Vienna and was never discovered by the Gestapo.

== Recognition ==
A simplified version of the medal awarded to those who are named Righteous Among the Nations.

On December 25, 1984, Yad Vashem recognized all three women, Franziska Cechal, Anna Kuchar, and Maria Böhm, as Righteous Among the Nations, which is recognition given to "non-Jews who took great risks to save Jews during the Holocaust."
