= Ewald Kleisinger =

Austrian Righteous Among the Nations (1912–2000)

- Born: June 11, 1912; Vienna, Lower Austria, Cisleithania
- Died: March 25, 2000 (aged 87); Vienna, Lower Austria, Austria
- Education: University of Vienna
- Spouse: Danuta Kleisinger (before 2000)
- Military career
- Allegiance: Wehrmacht
- Known for: Righteous Among the Nations

Dr. Ewald Kleisinger (11 June 1912, Vienna – 25 March 2000, Vienna) was from 1966, an Austrian Righteous Among the Nations and the husband of Danuta Kleisinger.

He worked, like his wife Danuta Kleisinger, for the Polish resistance movement in World War II during the occupation of Poland (1939–1945).
