= Maria Steiner =

Maria Steiner is an Austrian honoured as one of the Righteous Among the Nations.

Maria Steiner lived in Vienna and in 1942 she housed the Jew Hedwig Mendelsohn within her house. Hedwig Mendelssohn, chased by the Gestapo, was in danger of being arrested and deported. She asked Maria Steiner, who lived nearby, and Steiner immediately agreed to shelter her. Hedwig's husband Dr. Leopold Mendelsohn emigrated to Argentina in 1942, but because Hedwig had only married him in 1941 she wasn't able to get the necessary emigration papers together with him. Therefore, she stayed in Vienna alone. Her emigration papers came when she was already being chased by the Gestapo.

Maria Steiner hid Hedwig Mendelsohn despite frequent checks by both the block warden and the Gestapo. She hid her for three years, until the end of the war, and by doing this she saved Hedwig's life. After the war Hedwig followed her husband to Argentina.
