= Julius Madritsch =

Viennse Austrian businessman (1906–1984)

- Born: 4 August 1906; Vienna, Austria-Hungary
- Died: 11 June 1984 (aged 77)
- Resting place: Zentralfriedhof, Vienna, Austria; 48°08′58″N 16°26′28″E
- Occupation: Industrialist

Julius Madritsch (4 August 1906 – 11 June 1984) was a Viennese Austrian businessman and humanitarian who helped to save the lives of Jews during the Holocaust.

== Biography ==
In the spring of 1940 Madritsch came to Kraków to avoid enlistment in the German Wehrmacht. Being a trained draper, he was appointed trustee of two Jewish confectionery stores, Hogo and Strassberg. Madritsch soon learned that he could make more money by manufacturing textiles. At the end of 1940 Madritsch was able to open a sewing factory in Kraków that employed about 800 Jews and Poles with 300 sewing machines. Similar to Oskar Schindler, Madritsch gained a reputation as a good man who treated his Jewish workers well; he was "wonderful to his Jews".

In Kraków, Madritsch saved the lives of thousands of Jews and also sought to make their lives more bearable. He employed many workers with no professional experience or training. Together with his factory manager Raimund Titsch, he provided humane and comfortable working conditions. Every worker received enough bread each day to enable him to sell part of it and buy other foodstuffs. Jews were allowed to make contact with Poles outside the factory. The factory kitchens fed more than a thousand Jewish workers with food unobtainable elsewhere. Furthermore, Madritsch even set up new workshops including at Płaszów concentration camp (in 1943 after the Kraków Ghetto was liquidated and closed), Bochnia Ghetto (in 1942) and Tarnów Ghetto (in 1942; like Kraków it employed about 800 workers with 300 sewing machines) to help as many Jews as possible. He claimed that he did this due to the "constant begging of the Jewish council [in Kraków]".

Just before the Kraków Ghetto was liquidated in March 1943, Madritsch worked with Oswald Bosko to allow many families, particularly those with children, into his nearby factory; thus saving more Jews from death. He arranged to have the children placed in homes of Poles in the city. Several weeks later he obtained permission from the SS to transfer some of these Jews to his factories at Bochnia and Tarnów. On 25 March 1943, only twelve days after the liquidation of the Kraków Ghetto, Madritsch and Titsch transferred as many Jews as they could by train to Bochnia and Tarnów.

Madritsch had to intervene constantly with the SS, the police and the Labor Office to obtain work permits for his Jews. For instance, the Labor Office insisted that he hire Poles instead of Jews. General Government labor officials charged that Madritsch was "a saboteur of the Jewish transfer [into the ghetto] and could encounter difficulties with the Gestapo". This apparently did not deter Madritsch, who hired an increasing number of Jews, claiming that they were "important to the war effort". At one point Madritsch was arrested but soon released due to his close connections with certain SS officers.

At the end of August 1944 Płaszów commandant Amon Göth liquidated the Tarnów ghetto, the largest one remaining in West Galicia. Madritsch was assured that nothing would happen to "his people". Madritsch's Jews were sent to a slave labor camp in Silesia, attached to a synthetic oil factory. They were put to work building new workshops for the SS. Madritsch undertook this construction job so that his workers would be kept alive. Furthermore, some of his workers were smuggled out of the ghetto in trucks and made their way to Hungary and Slovakia.

On 14 September 1943, Madritsch was authorized to move his factories to Płaszów. He employed two thousand Jews as workers and provided them with food, clothing and shoes. Madritsch had to pay the SS for the food and other supplies. When Göth learned that nearly a quarter of Madritsch's workers were over the maximum age for slave laborers, he tried to reduce the workforce accordingly. However, Madritsch successfully insisted that the older workers "were the most valuable ones".

By 1944 the Red Army was approaching Kraków, and Płaszów was being liquidated. The Jews were to be deported to death camps like to Auschwitz and Gross-Rosen. Madritsch had no factories further west, and therefore could no longer protect his Jewish workers. However, he and Oskar Schindler had become friends. Schindler was about to open a munitions factory in Brněnec, Czech Protectorate which would employ Jews. When it came time to compile the famous list of Schindlerjuden in 1944, Schindler agreed to add sixty of Madritsch's Jews. After the war, however, their friendship soured because of a dispute over the transfer of some of Madritsch's Jews to Schindler's factory and related matters.

In 1964 Madritsch was honoured as "Righteous Among the Nations" by Yad Vashem. He was portrayed in the 1993 film Schindler's List by Hans-Jörg Assmann.

Julius Madritsch died on 11 June 1984. He is buried at the Zentralfriedhof in Vienna.

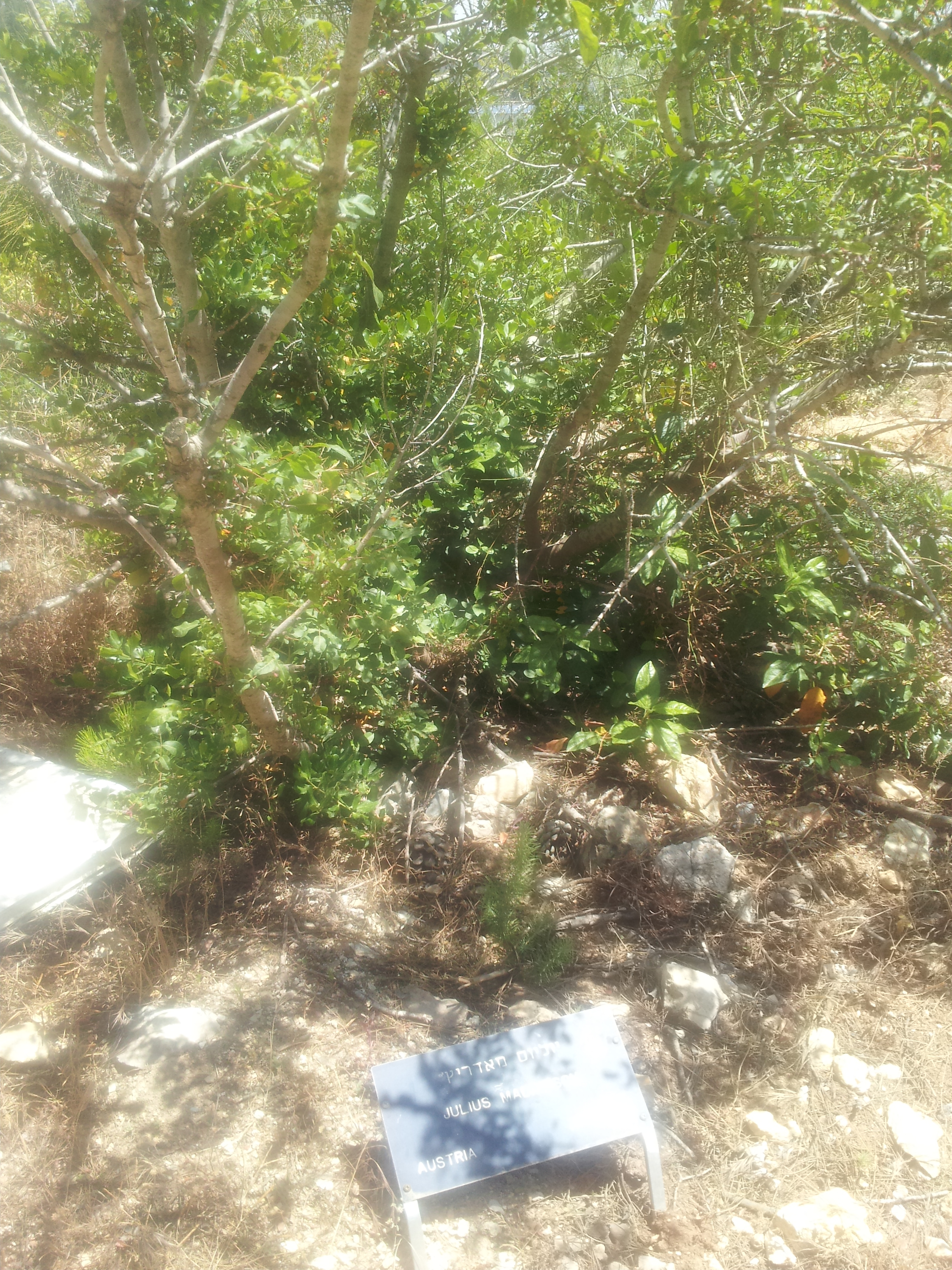
A tree planted to commemorate Righteous Among the nations Julius Madritsch at Yad Vashem

== Bibliography ==
- David M. Crowe. Oskar Schindler: The Untold Account of His Life, Wartime Activities, and the True Story Behind the List, Westview Press, 2004
- Martin Gilbert. The Righteous: The Unsung Heroes of the Holocaust, Henry Holt, 2002
- Julius Madritsch. Menschen in Not! (People in Distress!) (in German)
