= Maria Stocker =

Austrian Righteous Among the Nations recipient

Maria Stocker was born in Innsbruck, Austria. In 1945, during World War II she saved the life of two Jewish girls, from Poland – Lorraine Justman-Wisnicki and Miriam Fuks. For the effort, she made at the risk of her life, she is now a Righteous Among the Nations.

On January 18, 1945, an order arrived at the prison of Innsbruck which said that all occupants – among them also these two Jewish girls - should be moved to the KZ Bergen-Belsen.

Maria Stocker hosted Lorraine Justman-Wisnicki and Miriam Fuks, through the petition of the criminal investigation officer Rudolf Moser, in her apartment and hid them.

Although that she was aware of the danger caused by hiding two Jewish refugees from the prison in her apartment, she still agreed immediately. When the two girls arrived at her apartment, she hugged them with the words: "Thank God, that you are here, my beloved children." But after a few weeks the two girls had to change their accommodation, because the Gestapo were still chasing and close to catching them.

In 1980 Maria Stocker was awarded the title "Righteous Among the Nations", an honorary title awarded by Yad Vashem, Israel's official memorial to the victims of the Holocaust.
