= Erwin Lutz =

Erwin Lutz is an Austrian "Righteous Among the Nations".

In 1944 the police officer Erwin Lutz was working as a chef in a prison in Innsbruck. Together with police inspector Rudi Moser he decided to save five Jewish Polish girls from deportation into a concentration camp. He convinced his bosses in the prison administration to remove the girls' papers from the files and to give them jobs in his prison kitchen.

When orders came to transport all prisoners to KZ-Bergen-Belsen on January 18, 1945 they organized the escape of the five girls. Two of them managed to flee.

Erwin Lutz offered them his apartment in Ahorndorfstraße 3 as first shelter.
