= Gisela Legath =

Gisela Legath from Eberau (1908 – 1973) was a Burgenland woman who saved with the help of her two children Martin Legath and Frieda Legath the life of two Hungarian Jews from the Nazis during World War II by providing a shelter in their barn.

A Jewish Hungarian György Krausz (born 1922, in Szombathely/Hungary; died 2000) was a prisoner in a German work unit marching form Hungary to the Austrian-Hungary border forced to build the German "Südostwall" near the village Eberau in Burgenland.

Confronted with news of an upcoming march to the concentration camp Mauthausen, Krausz and his friend Cundra escaped into the forest to wait for the advancing Russians. Pursued by German soldiers, Krausz and Cundra fled into the nearby village Eberau. On their way, the two escapees met the 14-year-old Martin Legath and his 13-year-old sister Frieda Legath. Their mother Gisela Legath knew that the Jews would not be able to survive without their help, so she provided shelter.

Krausz and Cundra stayed in Gisela's barn till the Red Army liberated the village.

Gisela Legath received the honorary title "righteous among the Nations" from the Yad Vashem remembrance authority in Jerusalem.
