= Rudolf Wertz =

Austrian physician

Rudolf Wertz (born in Vienna; died 1966) was a physician from Vienna, who was conferred the title of Righteous Among the Nations by Yad Vashem for his actions to save Jews during the Holocaust.

In 1941, Wertz rescued Jews from deportation to Poland by issuing diagnoses of serious diseases to them. He acted because of humanitarian reasons and only charged a flat pro-forma ordination charge of 5 ℛ︁ℳ︁ from his Jewish patients.

One of the rescued was the Jewish Gertrude Fritz, who, by arriving at Wertz already was referenced on a deportation list. Wertz certified her an abscess in her uterus and ordered her six weeks of bed rest. There were some Gestapo-physicians who came to her, but they believed the sickness certificate would be correct. During this time Gertrude Fritz was not deported.

Later, the Gestapo discovered Wertz' relief operation and he was convicted to a punishment battalion. He was not exempted till end of war and still lived till 1966.
