= Ludwig and Maria Knapp =

Ludwig Knapp and his wife Maria Knapp are both Austrian Righteous Among the Nations.

A simplified image of the Righteous Among the Nations medal

In 1944, Ludwig Knapp and his wife Maria were the owners of a sawmill and an agricultural farm in Weitra in Gmünd in Lower Austria.

The couple saw how hard the life of Jews under the Nazi regime was. Their business suffered a shortage of workers, so they decided to employ Jewish forced labourers in order to save them from deportation.

Knapp received permission to employ 24 Jews in his sawmill. As he knew that the old people and children were not able to work and were particularly vulnerable, he deliberately chose seven old people and four children. Knapp and Maria cared for their workers. They considered their age and their health status in the working time and offered them warm food and clothing.

In April 1945, Knapp discovered that the authorities had decided to deport his workers to Theresienstadt. He knew this would mean certain death. Ludwig and Maria Knapp wanted to avoid this at all costs. They provided their workers with food for a month and told them to hide in a nearby forest. Then Ludwig went with his family on a short trip to Vienna.

When he returned two days later, he reported to the Gestapo that all the Jewish workers had fled during his absence. During his interrogation he could not explain why they had succeeded in their escape, but he offered to join the search for his "missing" workers. He led the Gestapo in the wrong direction, so that their sniffer dogs could not find them.

When the danger was past, the Knapps led the Jews out of the woods and hid them in their house until the war was over.
