= DiploFoundation =

Maltese-based non-profit

- Type: NGO
- Headquarters: Malta
- Director: Jovan Kurbalija
- Staff: 20
- Website: http://www.diplomacy.edu

The DiploFoundation (or Diplo, in short) is a non-profit organisation based in Malta, with offices in Geneva, Belgrade and Washington, D.C.

== History and mission ==
The founding of Diplo emerged from a project to introduce information and communications technology (ICT) tools to the practice of diplomacy, initiated in 1992 at the Mediterranean Academy of Diplomatic Studies in Malta.

In November 2002, Diplo was established as an independent non-profit foundation by the Government of Malta and the Government of Switzerland. In June 2006, the organisation was granted Special Consultative Status with the United Nations Economic and Social Council (ECOSOC). In September 2007, Diplo's online courses received academic accreditation from the University of Malta.

Diplo's mission is to strengthen the meaningful participation of all stakeholders in diplomacy, international relations, and policy areas such as Internet governance and climate change. It aims to increase the power of small and developing states to influence their own futures and development; increase international accountability and inclusivity; increase the legitimacy of international policy making; and improve global governance and international policy development.

== Programmes ==
A major focus of the organization is capacity development on subjects pertaining to diplomacy and international relations, including public diplomacy, e-diplomacy, and internet governance. The foundation's Master's degree program in contemporary diplomacy, with a separate track on Internet governance, is accredited through the University of Malta.

In the area of Internet governance, Diplo runs the Geneva Internet Platform (GIP), an initiative of the Swiss authorities launched in April 2014, and the GIP Digital Watch initiative, including the Digital Watch observatory.

== Executive ==
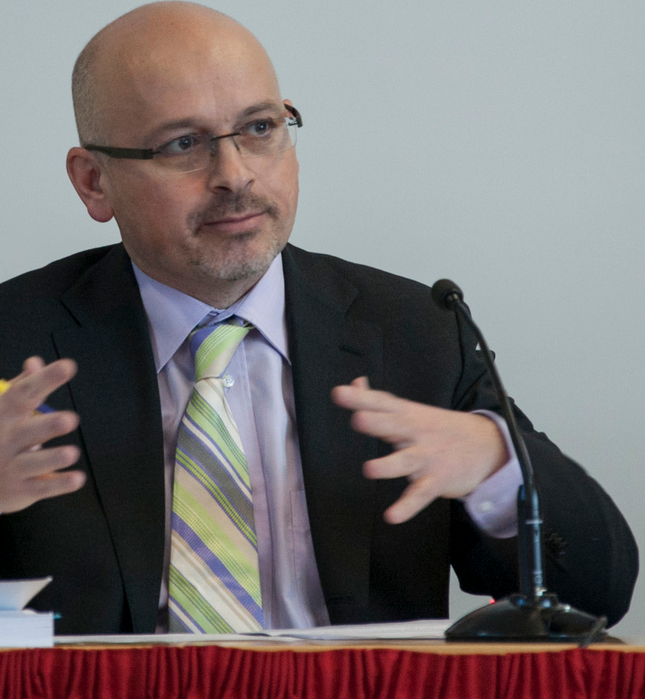
Dr. Jovan Kurbalija, director of the DiploFoundation, speaking at the Geneva Center for Security Policy in 2013.

Diplo is run by administrators, staff and associates, consisting of highly experienced diplomats, academics, learning specialists, and computer programmers. The board of administration is composed of the following:

- Prof. Dietrich Kappeler, honorary president, Diplo Senior Fellow and former director, Mediterranean Academy of Diplomatic Studies, Malta;
- Amb. Victor Camilleri, president, Ambassador of Malta to Libya;
- Amb. Theodor Winkler, vice-president, ambassador and former director of the Geneva Centre for the Democratic Control of Armed Forces;
- Amb. Saviour F. Borg, board member, ambassador and former permanent representative of Malta to the United Nations;
- Prof. Isabelle Calleja Ragonesi, International Relations Department, University of Malta;
- Prof. André Liebich, vice president, professor, international history and politics, Graduate Institute of International and Development Studies, Geneva;
- Amb. Maud Dlomo, Ambassador of South Africa to Madagascar;
- Dr Jovan Kurbalija, board secretary and director of DiploFoundation.
