= Anna Friessnegg =

During the National Socialist dictatorship the Viennese Anna Friessnegg (1899–1965), together with her husband Ludwig interceded on behalf of the persecuted Jews. Since 1984 she is an Austrian Righteous among the Nations.

Anna Friessnegg and her husband were the parents of the helpers Anna Manzer and Edi Stecher. In 1944 they helped the Hungarian Jew Melvine Deutsch, looked after her and hid her in their apartment, whenever there was any danger to be found and deported by the Gestapo.

Deutsch was placed in a labour camp of the company Siemens in Floridsdorf, Vienna. When she was deported to concentration camp Mauthausen, she escaped on the way to the train and came to Vienna, where she didn't know anybody. In her situation of despair she turned to Manzer, previously unknown to her. The Gestapo did not give up to look for Deutsch, who fled from the transporter to Mauthausen. When she was in danger at Manzer' s home, Manzer turned to her brother Stecher for help. Deutsch stayed with Stecher for a few months, without being found by the Gestapo.

But Manzer and Stecher didn't have enough rationed food. That is why their parents helped out and provided food for the hidden Deutsch. When the Gestapo searched the surroundings for Jews, Deutsch often had to hide in Frissneggs apartment as well. After the liberation Deutsch was able to leave that very same apartment safe and unharmed.

Her husband, Ludwig Friessnegg, as well as Anna Manzer and Edi Stecher also are Austrian Righteous among the Nations.
