= Friedericke Buchegger =

Austrian Righteous Among the Nations

Friedericke Buchegger is an Austrian Righteous Among the Nations.

Buchegger was deeply involved in the rescue of the Czech Jew Walter Posiles and his brothers Hans and Ludwig

In 1939, an anonymous informant reported Walter Posiles and the Viennese woman Edeltrud Becher to the Gestapo in Vienna for miscegenation. Friedericke Buchegger, a friend of Walter Posiles, used her connections to get an employee of the Viennese Gestapo to destroy the record of the accusation. Nevertheless, the brothers had to stay underground.

In 1942, the Posiles brothers fled Prague, where the government was arresting Jews and deporting them to the Theresienstadt concentration camp. They went to Vienna, where they stayed with Becher.

In 1942, Buchegger took in and hid Walter's brother Ludwig. In August 1942, when Walter was suffering from pneumonia and pleurisy, Buchegger found a doctor, Ernst Pick, willing to treat Walter in hiding.

Israel awarded Buchegger the honorific Righteous Among the Nations in 1978.
