= Dalimil =

Dalimil is a Czech masculine given name. It has its roots in the old Czech words dalje ('further', 'still') and mil ('kind'), so the name means "be still kind". Notable people with the name include:

- Dalimil Klapka (1933–2022), Czech actor and voice actor
- Dalimil Mikyska (born 1999), Czech ice hockey player

== See also ==
- Chronicle of Dalimil, first chronicle written in the Old Czech language
