= Kurt Reinhard (Austrian Righteous among the Nations) =

Kurt Reinhard was a Righteous Among the Nations.

== Life ==
By profession an amateur photographer, he helped a Jew, Eliezer Thum, who owned a photography business in German-occupied Poland and who survived with his family during the German rule thanks to Kurt Reinhard. He helped by providing them with the most necessary food (see first phase of the persecution of Jews); in the course of which he met Thum's cousin, Mina Scharf.

When Reinhard was transferred to Austria in 1941, he advised the families of Thum and Scharf to leave Poland with false identity papers. He even promised that he would provide Mina, whom he met in Tarnów on the way to the Russian front, and all family members with false identity papers. After some turmoil and effort, Reinhard was able to bring Mina to Germany. She came as a Polish foreign worker to Munich. Later he even got her an ID of the Verband der Deutschen im Ausland (Association of Germans Abroad), which allowed her greater freedom of movement. Kurt Reinhard managed to bring the rest of Mina's relatives to safety in Germany (the family of Mina, her uncle Thum, and others).
