= Anton Dietz =

Anton Dietz (28 December 1888 in Dallwitz – 1 January 1960 in Innsbruck) was an Austrian police officer and the Righteous Among the Nations.

On 18 January 1945, there was an order to bring all inmates of the prison of Innsbruck to the concentration camp Bergen-Belsen. Five female Jews were planning to escape the prison. The two inspectors Karl Dickbauer and Anton Dietz supported them. Only two could manage to flee.

Anton Dietz then organized faked documents for the two women who were hiding. He pretended they were Christian Poles who lost their documents on their way to Austria. This way they were able to receive operating sheet. They started working in a village in Salzburg, St. Martin. Declared immigrant workers they survived the war.
