= Edith Hauer-Frischmuth =

Edith Hauer-Frischmuth (1913 in Vienna – 2004 in Altaussee) was an Austrian woman, named one of the Righteous Among the Nations.

She saved her Jewish friend, Monika Taylor, from being arrested by the Gestapo in 1942. In the Austrian resistance she supplied Jews with fake documents and helped them to get out of the country. At the end of the war she also worked for the British Army, for which she received an award.
