= Anna Ehn =

Austrian Righteous Among the Nations

- Born: Anna Ehn; 1931 (age 94–95)

Anna Ehn (born 1931) is an Austrian Righteous Among the Nations.

One day Anna was approached by a 13-year-old Jewish girl, Illona Friedman, on her way to Mass. She instantly offered food to the hungry child, and promised to do so every day.

Ilona Friedman came to Vienna from Hungary in 1944, when she and her family were part of a transport of Jews. When the air strikes on Vienna intensified, children like her had to tidy up streets, and cemeteries, after bombings. Ilona and people like her had to beg for money, and food on the streets since they had nothing to eat and were hungry all the time.

When Ilona's older sister was injured in a bombing and taken to a SS-hospital, she asked Anna Ehn to save her sister from deportation into a death camp. Eventually, Anna Ehn went to the hospital and got her will to take Ilona Friedman's sister home. Anna looked after the girl and eventually saved her life.

She was rewarded "Righteous Among the Nations" by the Yad Vashem Institute.
