= The Maidens' War =

Tale in Bohemian tradition

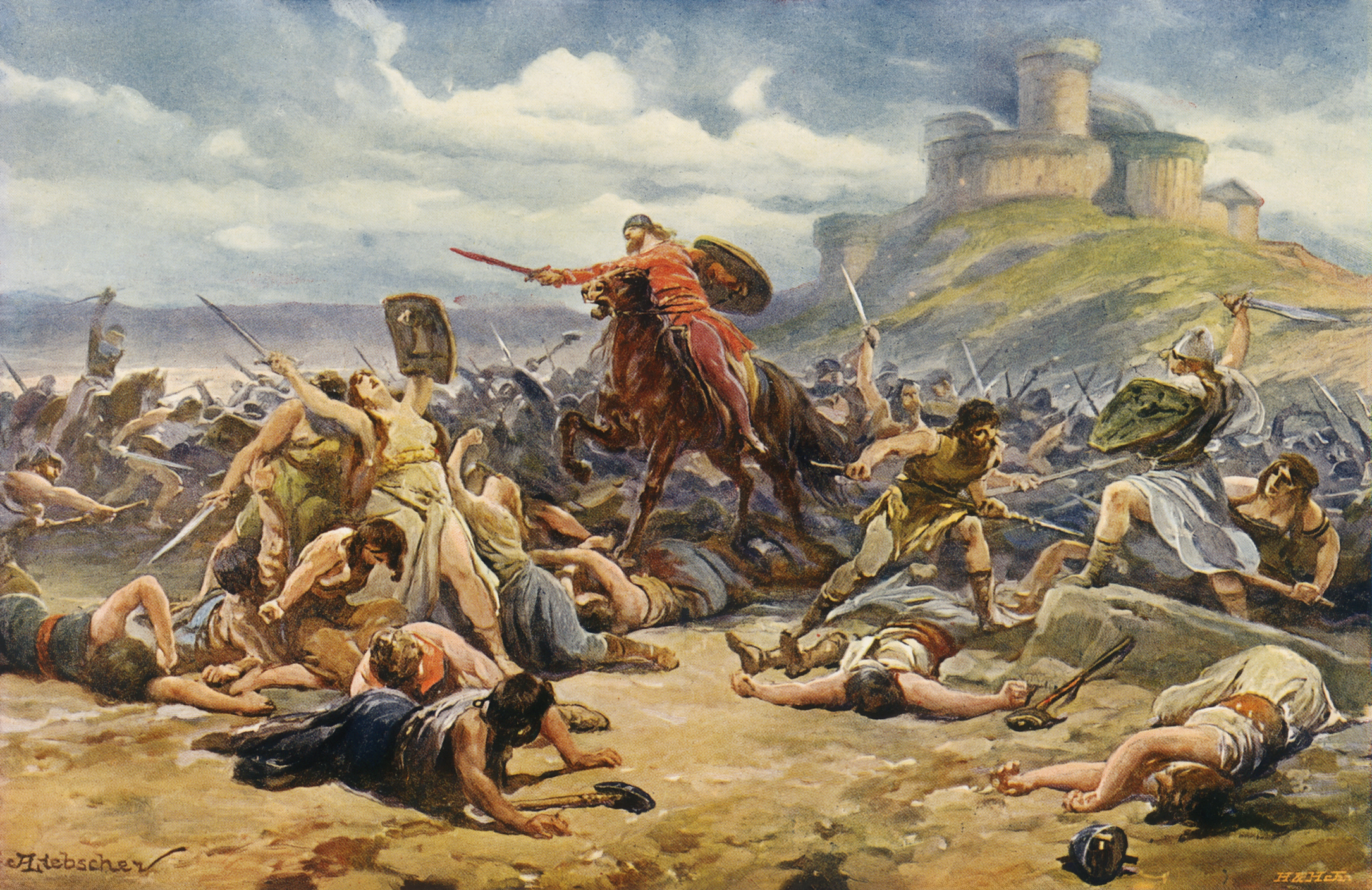
The Maidens' War, painted by Adolf Liebscher

The Maidens' War (Czech: Dívčí válka) is a tale in Bohemian tradition about an uprising of women against men. According to legend, it occurred sometime in the 8th century. It first appeared in the twelfth-century Chronica Boemorum of Cosmas of Prague, and later in the fourteenth-century Chronicle of Dalimil.

== Tale ==
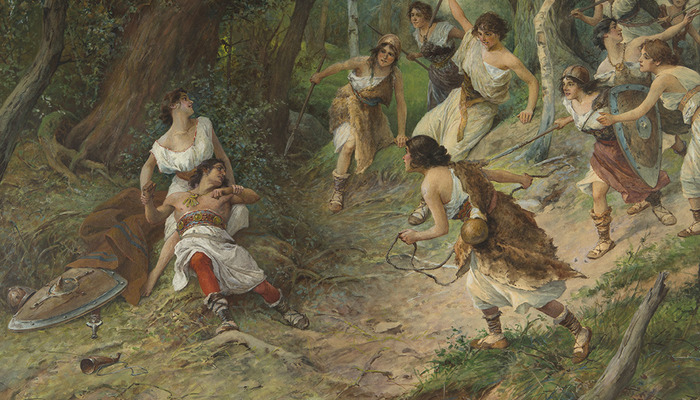
Šárka and Ctirad, Painted by Věnceslav Černý

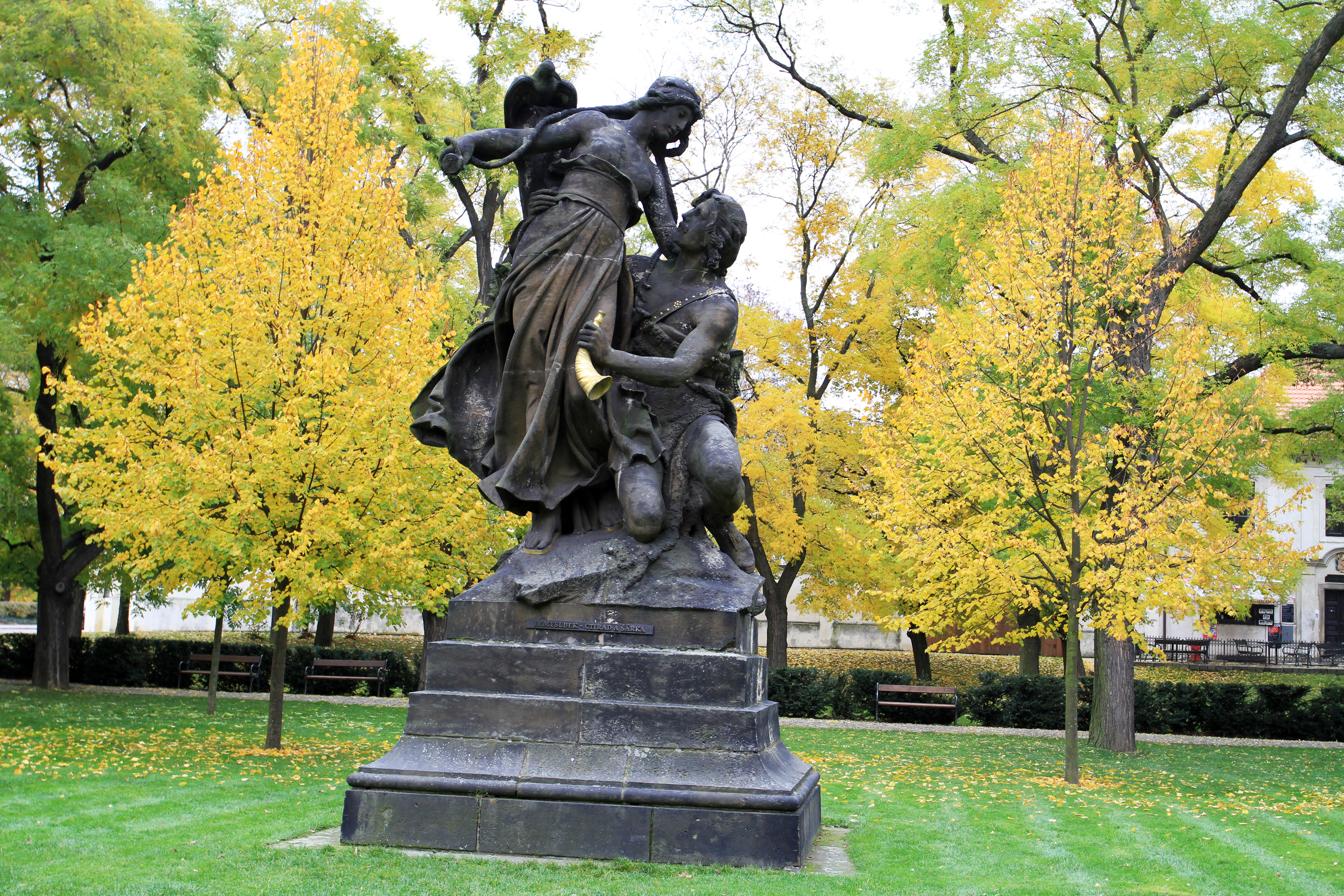
Ctirad and Šárka, sculpture by Josef Václav Myslbek (1881) at Vyšehrad

Following the death of Libuše, Vlasta led a band of women against the (male) forces of Libuše's widower Přemysl and founded the castle Děvín. The men, however, despite the warnings of Duke Přemysl, laughed at their preparations. Vlasta then sent the most beautiful girls to enchant the men with their charms, and led an attack against the men who came to Děvín, which the women won.

Šárka, Vlasta's lieutenant, entrapped a band of armed men led by Ctirad by tying herself to a tree, claiming that the rebel maidens had tied her there and put a horn and a jug of mead out of reach to mock her. Ctirad believed her story and untied her from the tree, whereupon she poured mead for the men to show her thanks. Little did the men know that Šárka and the maidens had put a sleeping potion into the mead. When all the men had fallen asleep, Šárka blew the horn as a signal for the rebel maidens to come out of their hiding places and join her in slaughtering the men. Ctirad was captured and then tortured to death in Děvín. The valley where it happened is today called Divoká Šárka (Wild Šárka).

When the men at Vyšehrad learned of this, they became angry and began to beat and capture women on the road. Vlasta responded with an attack at Vyšehrad, but she was killed and her army defeated. Děvín Castle was burned, and the women's rule ended.

== In popular culture ==
Bedřich Smetana depicted the Maiden's War in Šárka (1875), which is also part of his collection of symphonic poems, Má vlast.

The legend inspired the composition of multiple operas, including Zdeněk Fibich's Šárka (1897) and Leoš Janáček's opera (1918/1924) by the same name.

In 1947, Milada Horáková founded a feminist magazine named Vlasta in reference to the mythological heroine. During the socialist era, the Czechoslovak Women's Union (tied to the ruling Communist Party) kept operating the magazine, which became highly popular in the country.

The legend is included in Jiří Trnka's animated film Old Czech Legends (1953).

František Ringo Čech wrote a play entitled Maidens' War in 1986.

The story is also depicted in the 2009 film The Pagan Queen by Constantin Werner.

Dívčí Válka (2013), a manga series by Kouichi Ohnishi, is titled after the legend and the protagonist, a young girl who joins the Hussite Wars, is named Šárka as well. The fifth volume of the manga featured explicit underage nudity and sex (although historically accurate, due to the inclusion of the Adamite sect).

The story is featured in books in the 2018 game Kingdom Come Deliverance, set in 1403 Bohemia.

In the series A Discovery of Witches the emperor of Bohemia, Rudolf II has a hunting bird named Sarka. Matthew de Clairmont remarks that she is named after the warrior from the Maiden’s War who is rumored to have killed a battalion single-handedly.

== See also ==
- Woman warrior
- List of women warriors in folklore
- Ancient Bohemian Legends
