= Palacký Bridge =

Palacký Bridge Palackého most
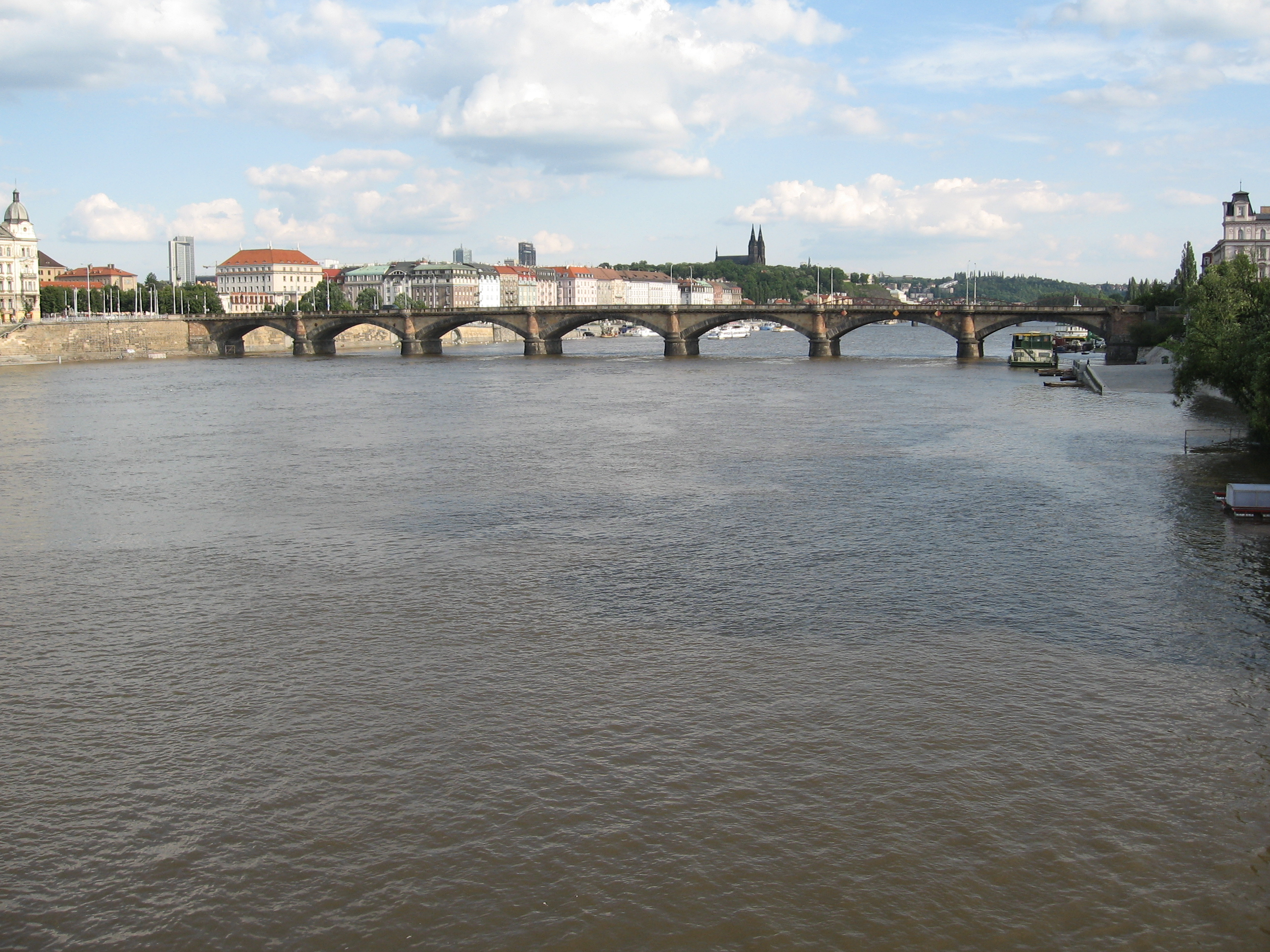
- Palacký Bridge, view from Jiráskův most
- Coordinates: 50°04′22″N 14°24′44″E
- Crosses: Vltava
- Locale: Prague, The Czech Republic

Characteristics
- Material: Stone
- Total length: 228,8 m
- Width: 10,7 m
- Height: 11-12 m

History
- Architect: Bedřich Münzberger
- Engineering design by: Josef Reiter
- Constructed by: Brothers Klein, A.Schmolla and E.Gärtner
- Opened: 1878

Location
- Interactive map of Palacký Bridge

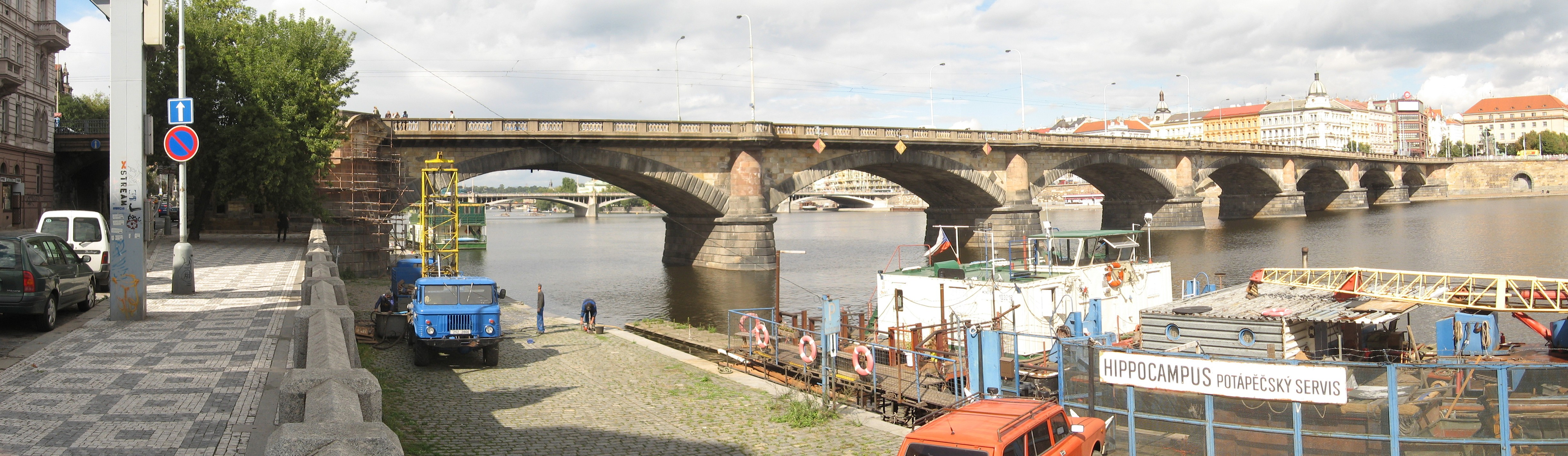
Palacký Bridge, view from Hořejší nábřeží

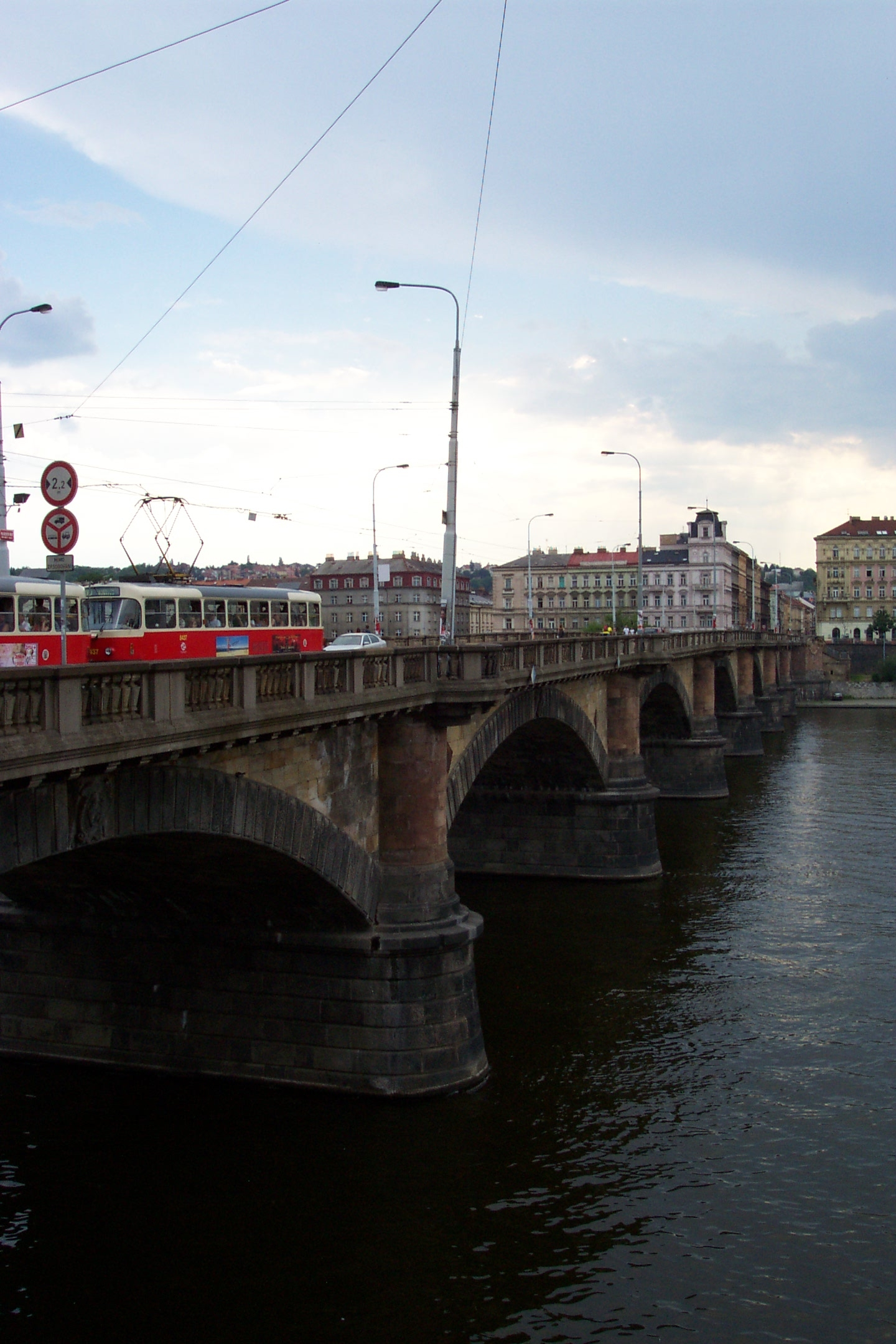
View of the north side of the bridge

The Palacký Bridge (1876) (Czech: Palackého most) is a bridge in Prague. It is one of the oldest functioning bridges over the Vltava in Prague after the Charles Bridge.

It was built as the third major bridge shortly after the 1868 opening of the Franz Joseph Bridge, designed by Rowland Mason Ordish which was damaged in 1941 and dismantled in 1946.

Josef Václav Myslbek created statues of four pairs of legendary couples for the bridge: Ctirad and Šárka, Libuše and Přemysl, Lumír and Píseň , and Záboj and Slavoj. These were later removed to the grounds of the Vyšehrad.
