= CWU =

CWU may refer to:

== Trade unions ==
- Christian Workers' Union, Belize
- Communication Workers Union (disambiguation), multiple organisations
- Congressional Workers Union, United States
- Culinary Workers Union, United States

== Universities ==
- Central Washington University, Ellensburg, Washington, United States
- Central Women's University, Dhaka, Bangladesh
- China Women's University, Beijing, China

== Other ==
- Church Women United, United States, an ecumenical association
- Colliers Wood United F.C., London, England
- Crowhurst railway station, England
- Czech Women's Union
- Czechoslovak Women's Union
- Wuhan Airlines, China
