= Lumír and Píseň =

Sculpture in Prague, Czech Republic

Lumír and Song
- Lumír a Píseň (Czech)
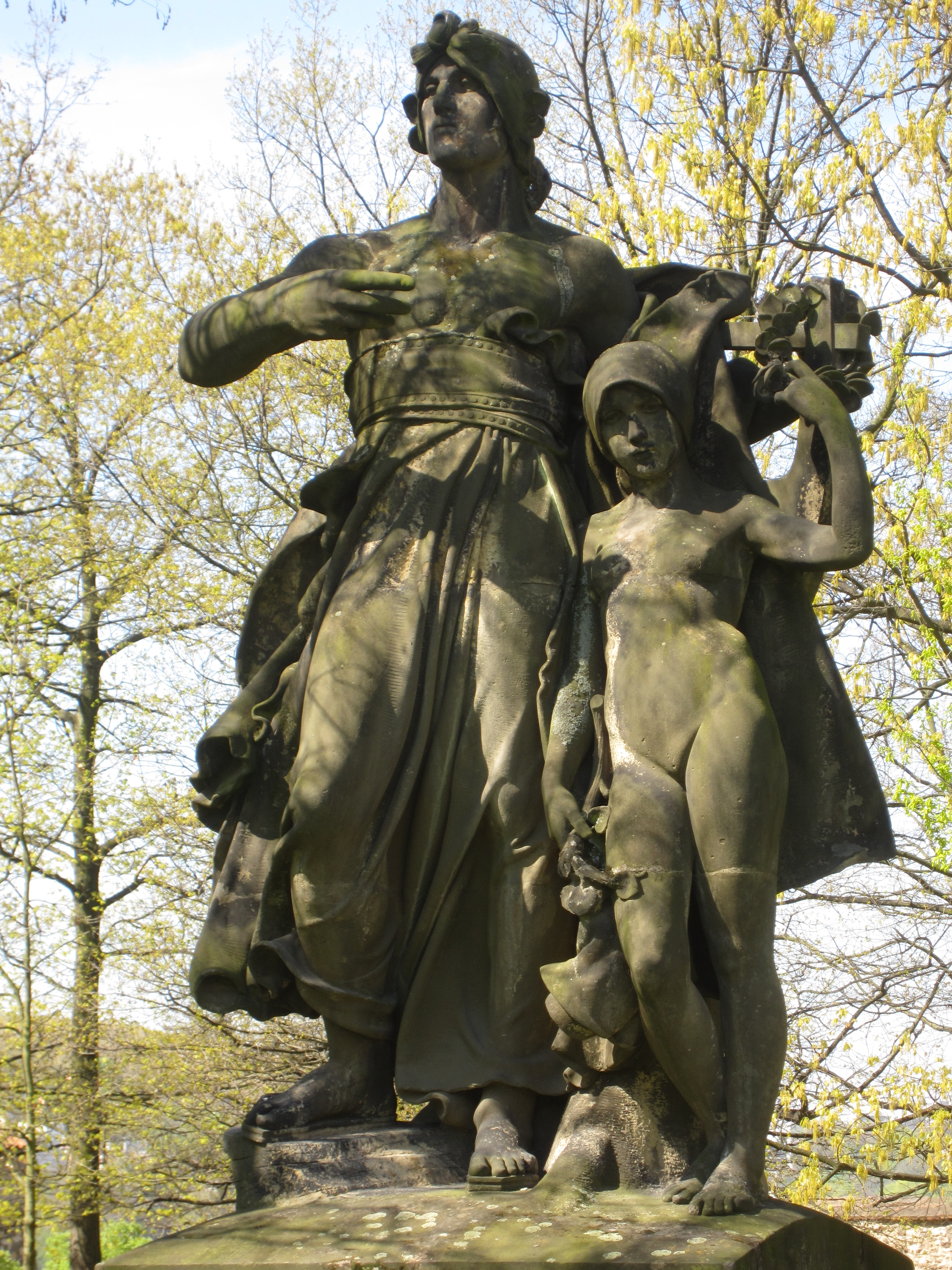
- The sculpture in 2016
- Artist: Josef Václav Myslbek
- Type: Sculpture
- Location: Prague, Czech Republic; 50°3′50.12″N 14°25′2.69″E

Lumír and Song (Czech: Lumír a Píseň) is an outdoor sculpture made by Josef Václav Myslbek in 1889-1897 for Palacký Bridge. Damaged from American bombing on February 14, 1945, statues were removed in 1948 in connection with the bridge reconstruction and installed at Vyšehradské sady in Vyšehrad, Prague, Czech Republic. The statue was previously at the New Town's side of Vltava and it was installed in the gardens with two other statues from the opposite Smíchov's side. The fourth statue, Libuše and Přemysl, was heavily damaged and repaired until reinstalled with the other three in 1977.

A bronze model of this statue is placed in the old town hall of the Prague Old Town.

It depicts the legendary bard Lumír and Píseň ("song"). According to Dvůr Králové Manuscript Lumír refused to sing a hymn for the winners of The Maidens' War, and sings instead his last song to the Vyšehrad, then breaks his instrument. Albeit lacking authenticity, the story was in the 19th century considered a symbol of national conscience.

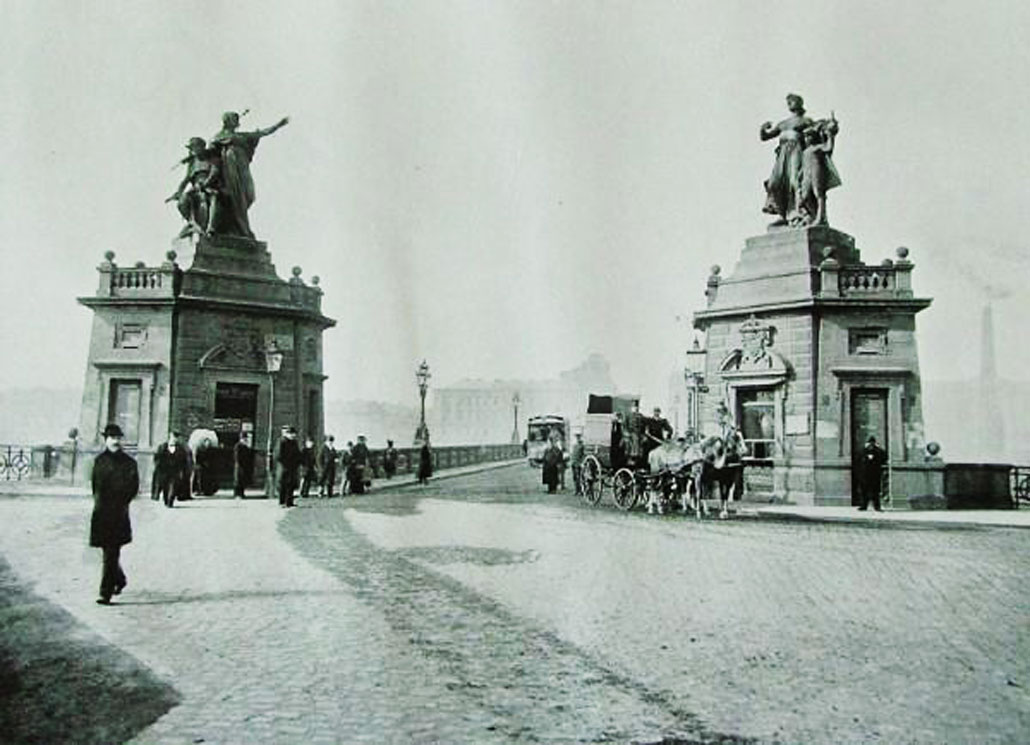
19th century photo
