= Dead Leaves (disambiguation) =

Dead Leaves is a 2004 Japanese anime film.

Dead Leaves may also refer to:

- Dead Leaves (1998 film), a film by Constantin Werner
- Dead Leaves (album), an album by Merzbow
- "Dead Leaves", a song by Sentenced from the album Frozen

== See also ==
- Dead leaf or Kallima inachus, a species of butterfly
