= Oldřich Pecl =

Czech lawyer, businessman and anti-communist dissident (1903–1950)

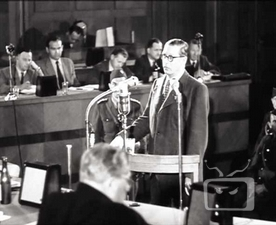
- Pecl during his trial in 1950
- Born: 14 September 1903; Bohuslavice, Moravia, Austria-Hungary
- Died: 27 June 1950 (aged 46); Pankrác Prison, Prague, Czechoslovakia
- Resting place: Motol Cemetery, Prague
- Occupations: Lawyer, entrepreneur
- Known for: Member of the anti-communist opposition, victim of a show trial

Oldřich Pecl (14 September 1903 – 27 June 1950) was a Czech lawyer, entrepreneur and member of the anti-communist opposition in Czechoslovakia. Following the communist coup d'état in 1948, he was targeted by the regime and included in the high-profile show trial of Milada Horáková and others. He was sentenced to death and executed by hanging at Pankrác Prison in 1950.

== Early life and pre-war career ==
Oldřich Pecl was born into a poor rural teacher's family in Bohuslavice in Moravia, Austria-Hungary (now part of Kyjov, Czech Republic). He attended the gymnasium in Valašské Meziříčí. In 1918, he temporarily interrupted his studies to enlist in the Czechoslovak Army, participating in the military securing of Opava, which had been declared by local German nationals as the capital of the breakaway province of Sudetenland.

He completed his secondary education in 1921. While at the gymnasium, his classmate was Záviš Kalandra, with whom he co-edited a student magazine; decades later, both men would be co-defendants in the same communist show trial and executed on the same day. Pecl went on to graduate from the Faculty of Law at Charles University in Prague, subsequently establishing a successful legal practice and entering business. His second wife was Ankica Milić, the sister of a Yugoslav diplomat. The most significant asset of his business portfolio was the Etna anthracite mine located in Lhotice near České Budějovice.

== Anti-communist resistance ==
During the German occupation in World War II, Pecl actively engaged in the underground anti-Nazi resistance movement. Following the liberation of the country in 1945, his anthracite mine was nationalized under the decrees of the Košice Program.

After the communist takeover in February 1948, Pecl became a prominent financier and supporter of illegal structures formed by former members of the non-communist Czechoslovak National Socialist Party. Working within the underground movement, he helped draft a new party ideology and economic program.

Pecl advocated for the creation of a broad-based opposition movement that would extend beyond traditional political parties, centered around an "ideology of social progress and political, economic, and spiritual security." However, his conceptual model of a centrist socialist party was ultimately not adopted by other resistance factions. Throughout this period, Pecl maintained clandestine contacts with Czechoslovak political exiles abroad, sending intelligence reports about the situation inside the country, which were primarily compiled and analyzed from open-source press publications.

== Trial and execution ==
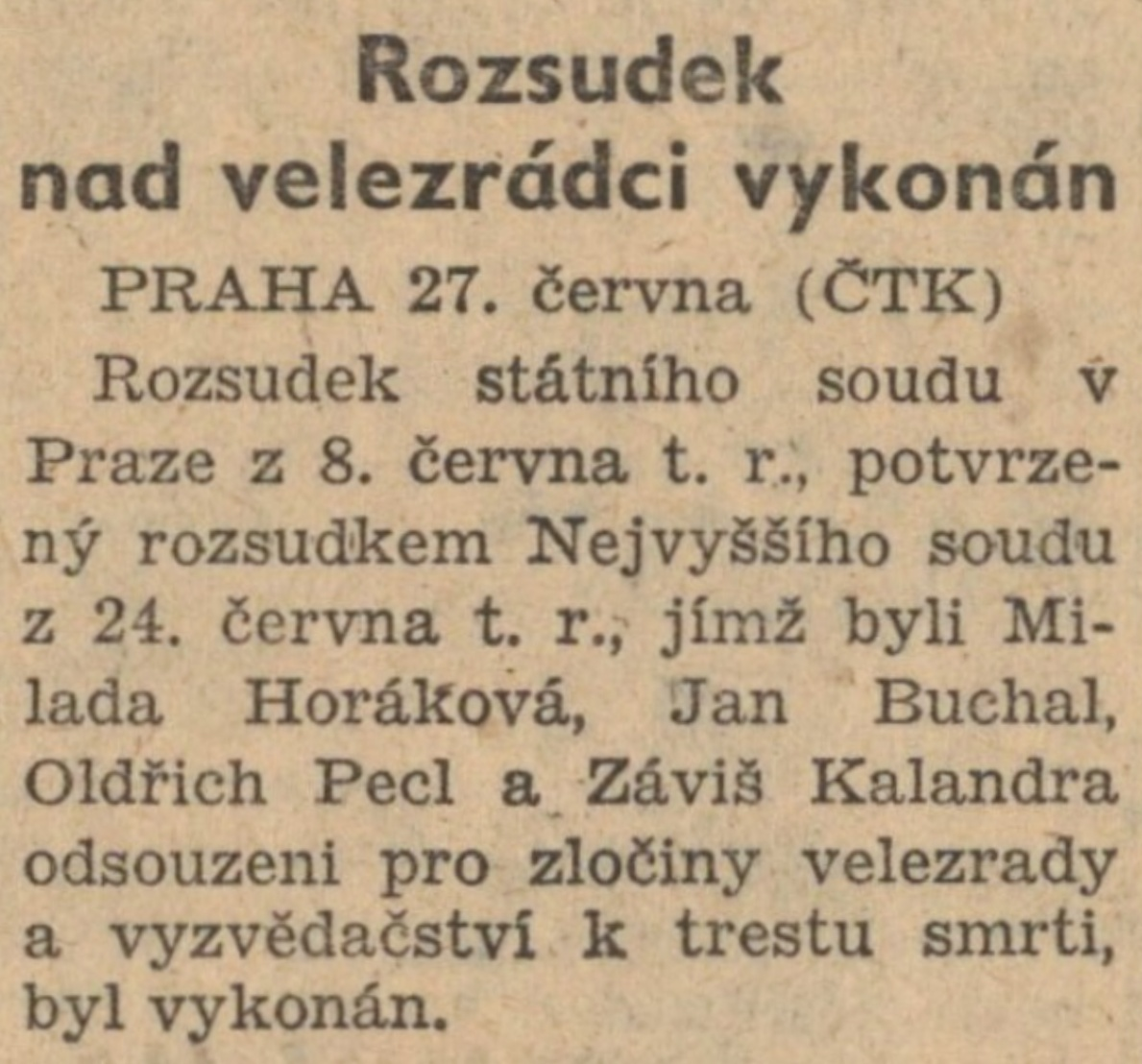
Announcement in the state newspaper Rudé právo (28 June 1950) stating that the sentences against the "traitors" had been carried out

Pecl was arrested by the state security apparatus on 8 November 1949. The regime selected him as a co-defendant in the fabricated show trial against Milada Horáková and her associates. The state prosecutors chose Pecl to fulfill a specific propaganda role: his background as a former mine owner allowed the regime to frame him as a greedy "capitalist." Furthermore, investigators leveraged his authorship of political memoranda, his close ties to the Marxist intellectual Záviš Kalandra, and the fact that his wife was of Yugoslav origin, which aligned with Soviet propaganda needs during the contemporary Tito–Stalin split.

The State Court sentenced Oldřich Pecl to death. He filed an appeal on 19 June 1950, but the Supreme Court rejected all appeals on 24 June 1950. Along with Milada Horáková, Záviš Kalandra, and Jan Buchal, Pecl was executed by hanging at Prague's Pankrác Prison on 27 June 1950. The execution took place at 4:55 a.m., and he was pronounced dead at 5:04 a.m.

Pecl's remains were cremated at the Strašnice Crematorium. On 6 October 1953, the urn containing his ashes was moved from the crematorium storage to a warehouse inside Pankrác Prison. On 5 May 1965, the urn was secretly buried in a mass grave at the Motol Cemetery in Prague. A symbolic memorial gravestone dedicated to Pecl stands at the Honorary Burial Grounds of the Ďáblice Cemetery, which commemorates executed and tortured political prisoners of the communist era regardless of where their actual remains were deposited.

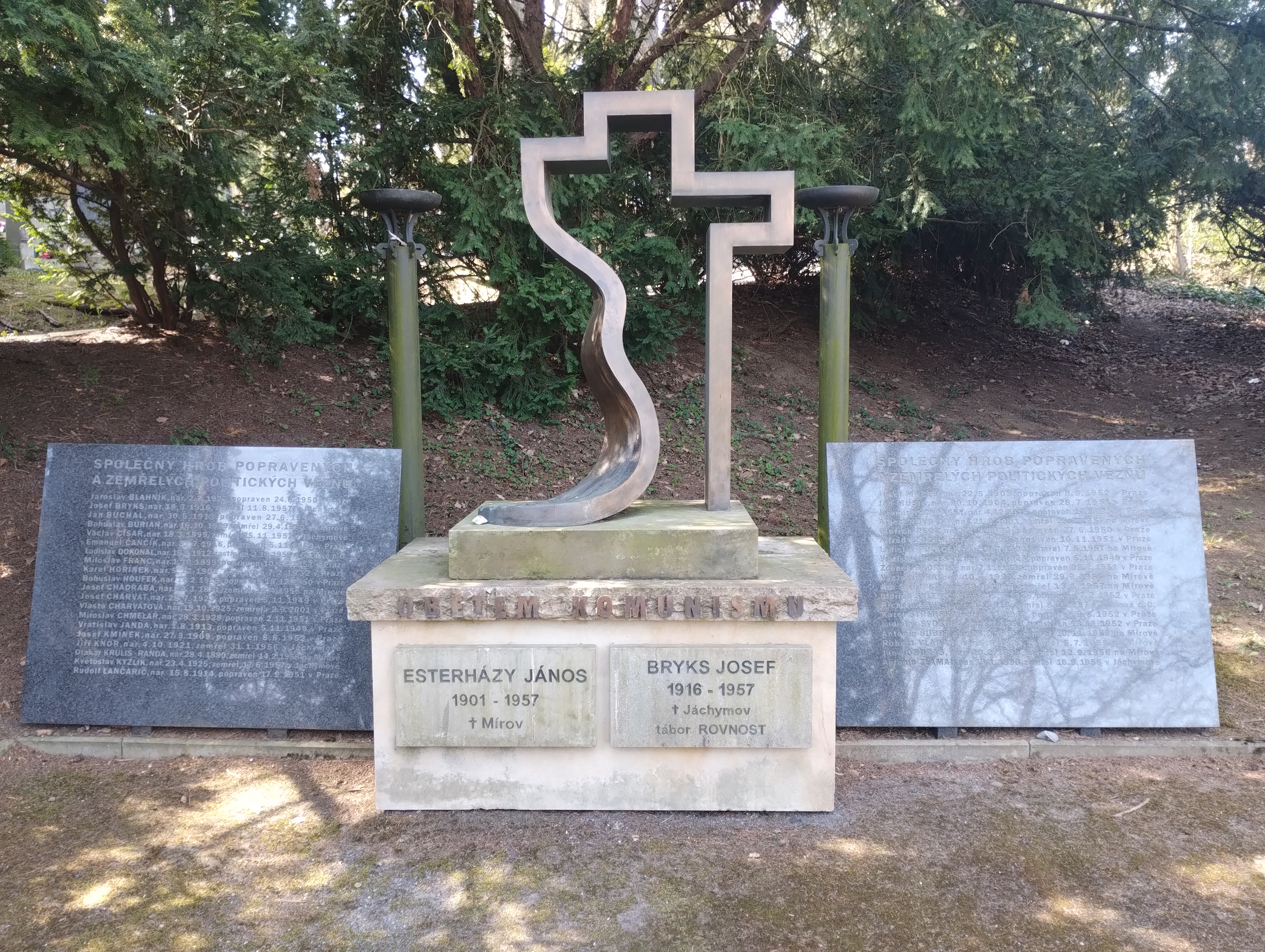
The Memorial at the Honorary Burial Grounds for Political Prisoners at the Motol Cemetery

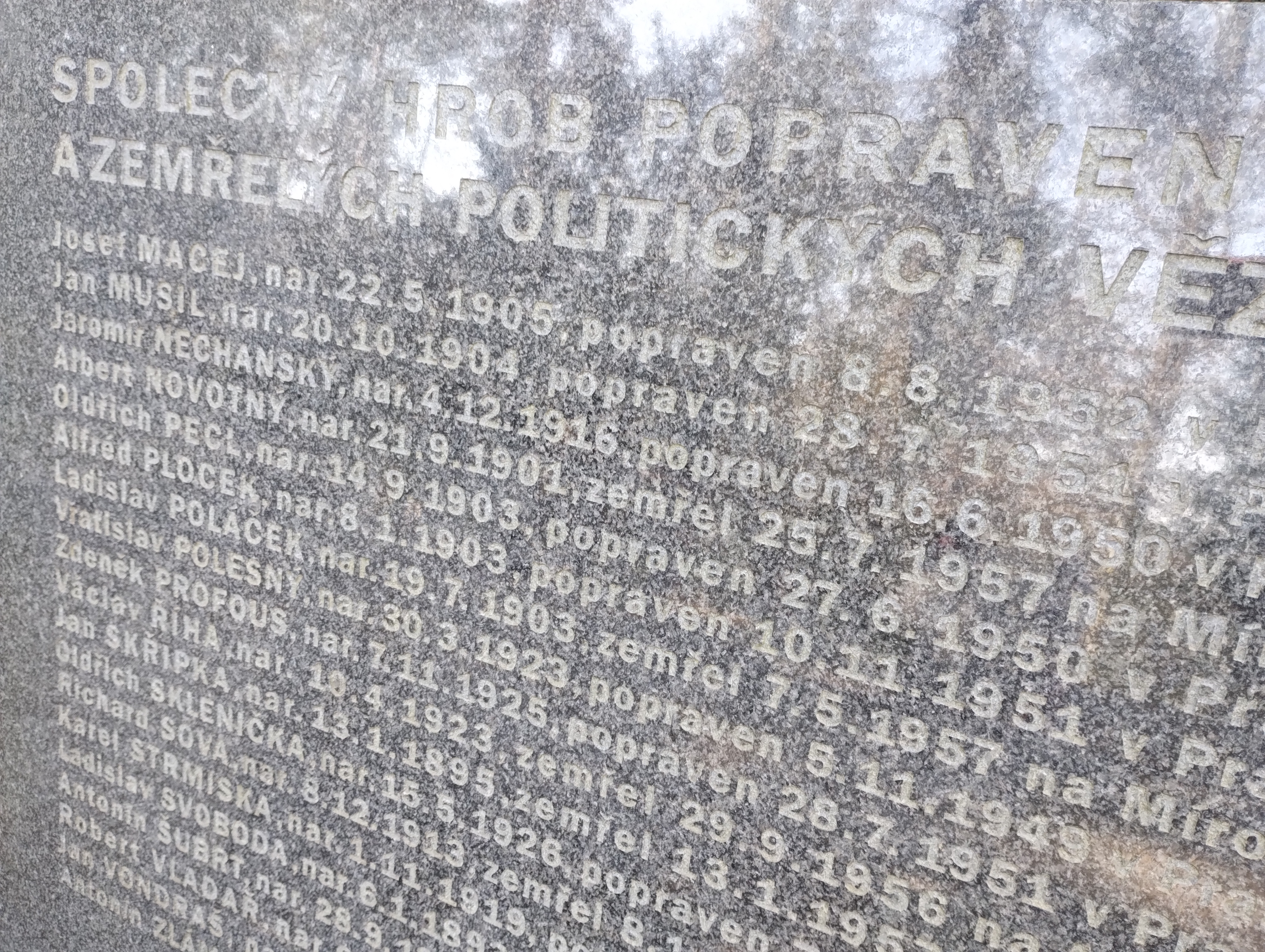
The right plaque at the Motol memorial site, listing the name of O. Pecl

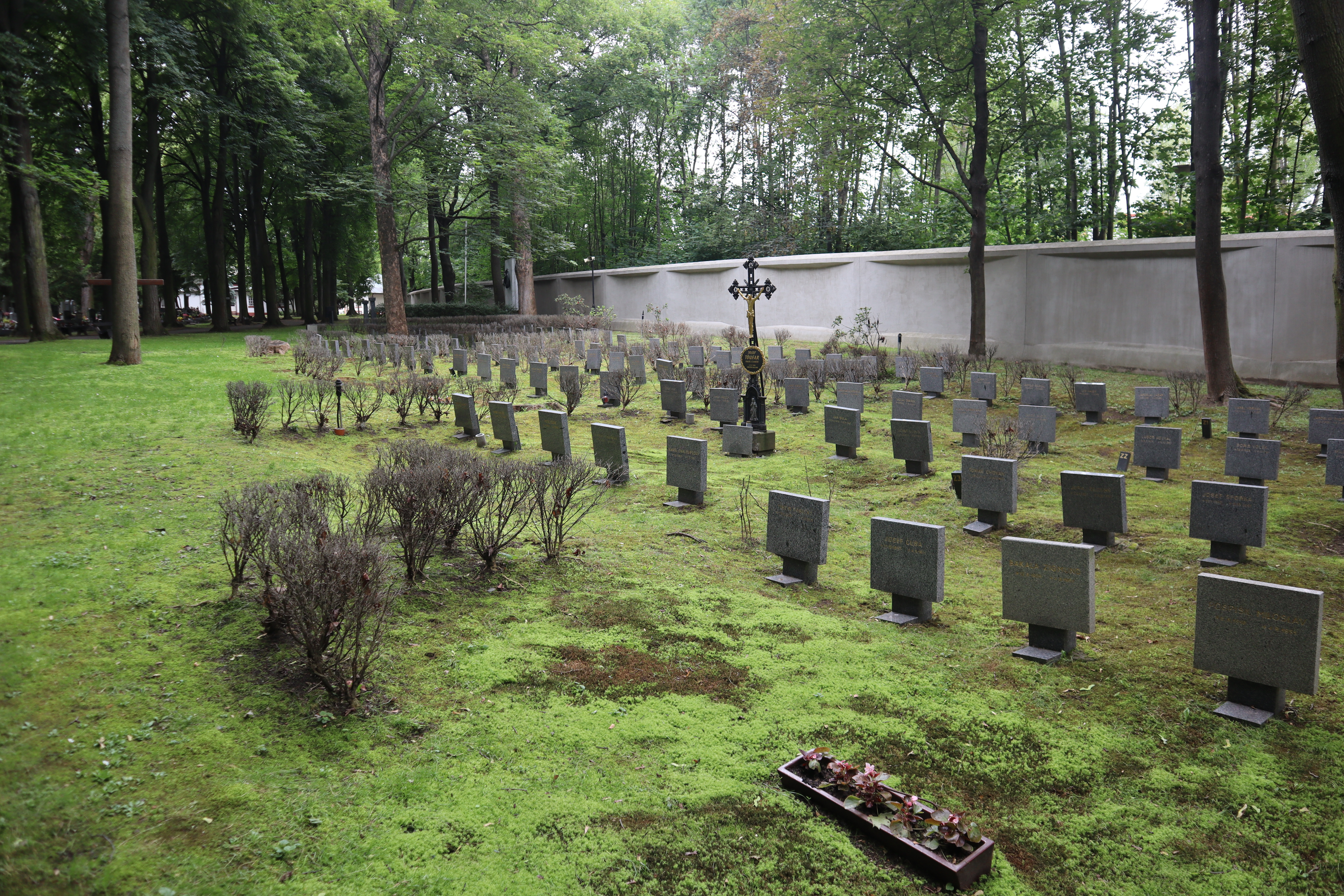
The Honorary Burial Grounds for victims of the communist regime at the Ďáblice Cemetery

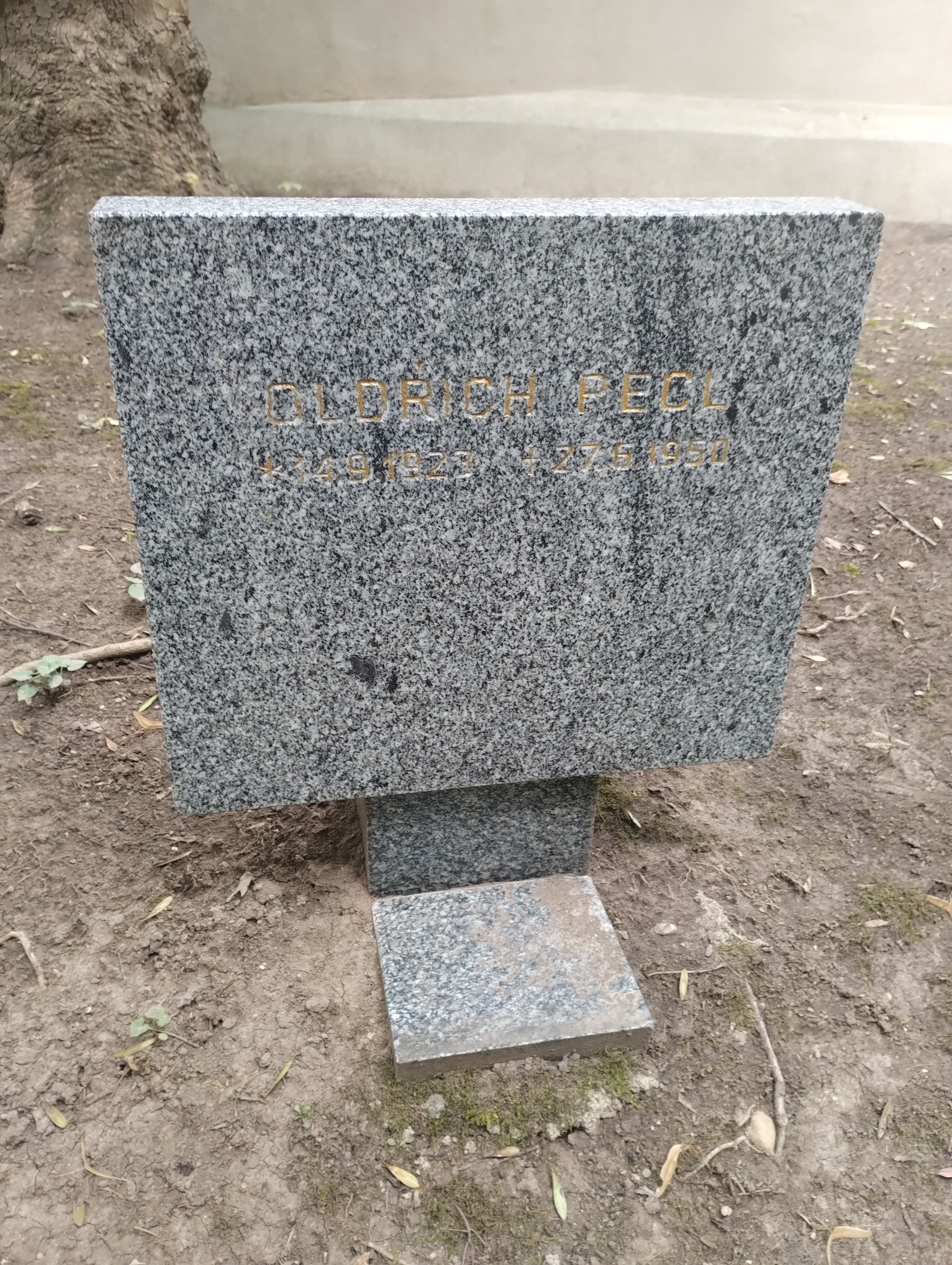
The symbolic gravestone of Oldřich Pecl at the Ďáblice Cemetery

== Commemoration and awards ==
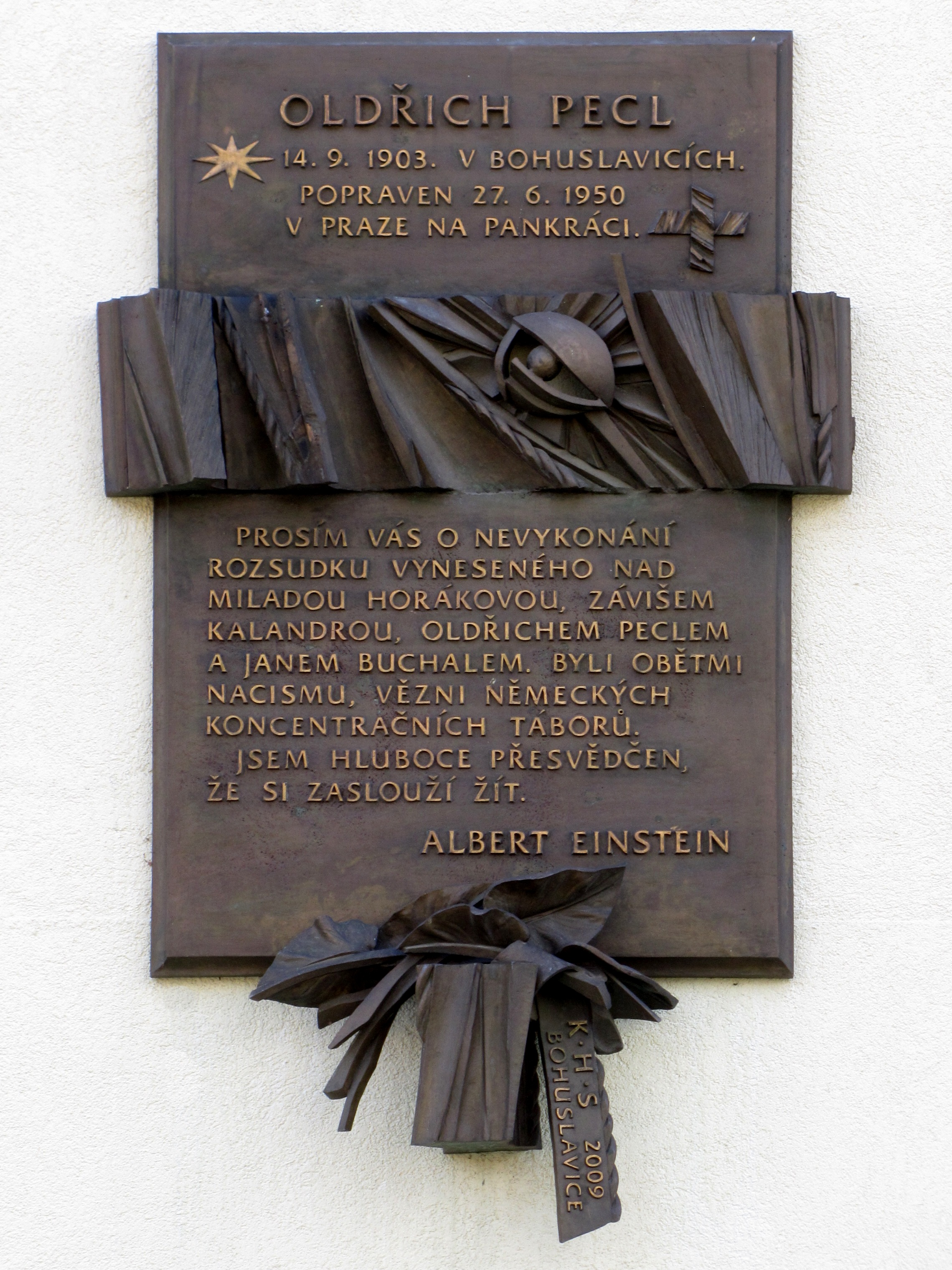
Memorial plaque in Bohuslavice containing Einstein's plea

In 2010, he was posthumously awarded the Václav Benda Award by the Institute for the Study of Totalitarian Regimes.

On 27 June 2009, a commemorative plaque dedicated to Pecl was unveiled on the building shared by the post office and primary school in his birthplace of Bohuslavice. The plaque features the text of an unsuccessful telegram sent to President Klement Gottwald by Albert Einstein, pleading for clemency for Horáková, Kalandra, Pecl, and Buchal, noting they were veterans of the anti-Nazi struggle.

On 10 October 2019, a commemorative plaque was installed at Pařížská 1073/1 in the Old Town of Prague, where Pecl lived and was arrested, as part of the Last Address international memorial project.

A memorial plaque is also dedicated to him at Mařákova 155 in Řevnice, marking a residence where he frequently stayed.

His name is inscribed on the Monument to Milada Horáková and the Victims of Communism located at Náměstí Hrdinů in Nusle, Prague 4, standing directly in front of the High Court in Prague.

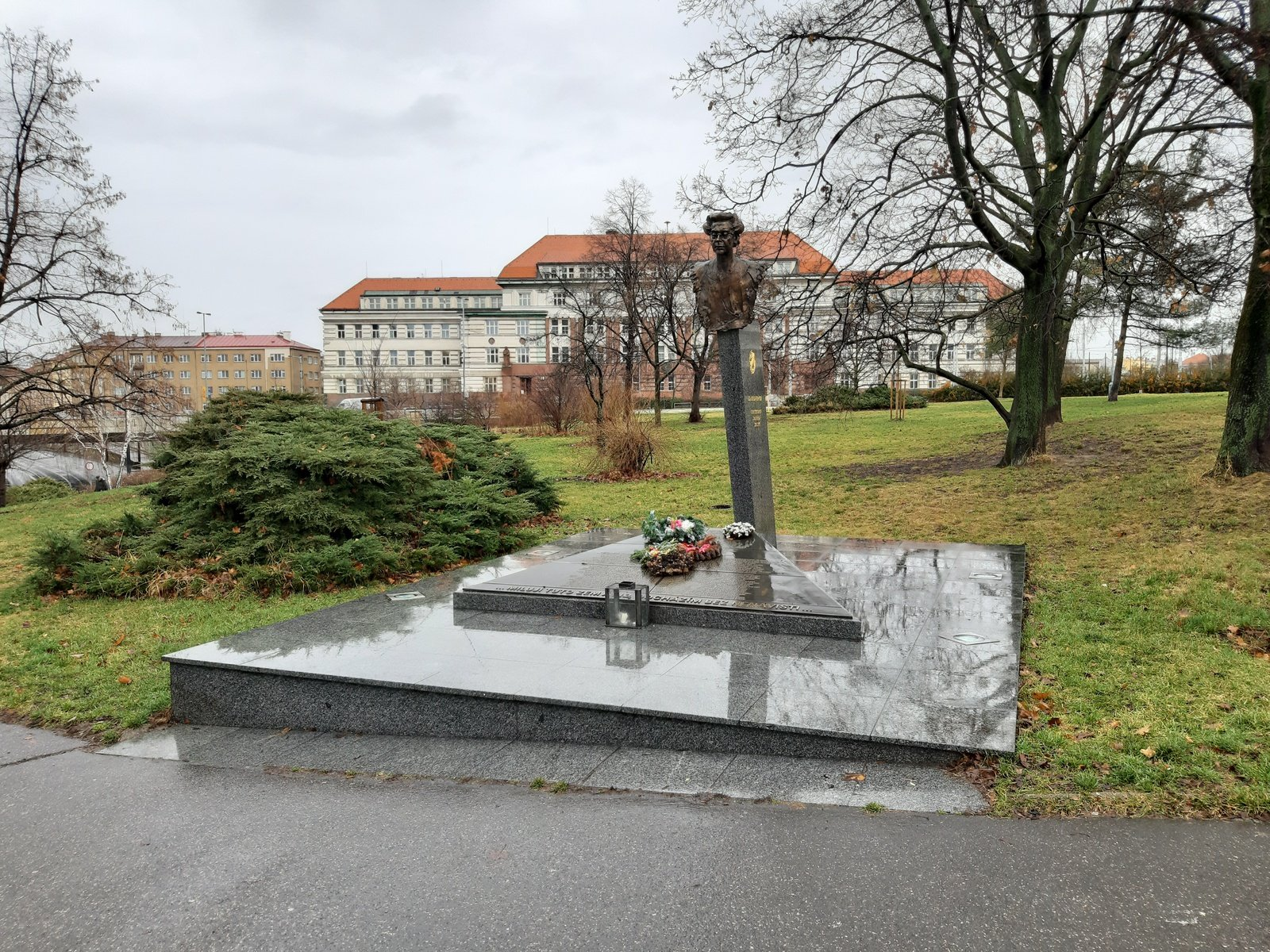
The Monument to Milada Horáková and the victims of communism at Náměstí Hrdinů in Prague

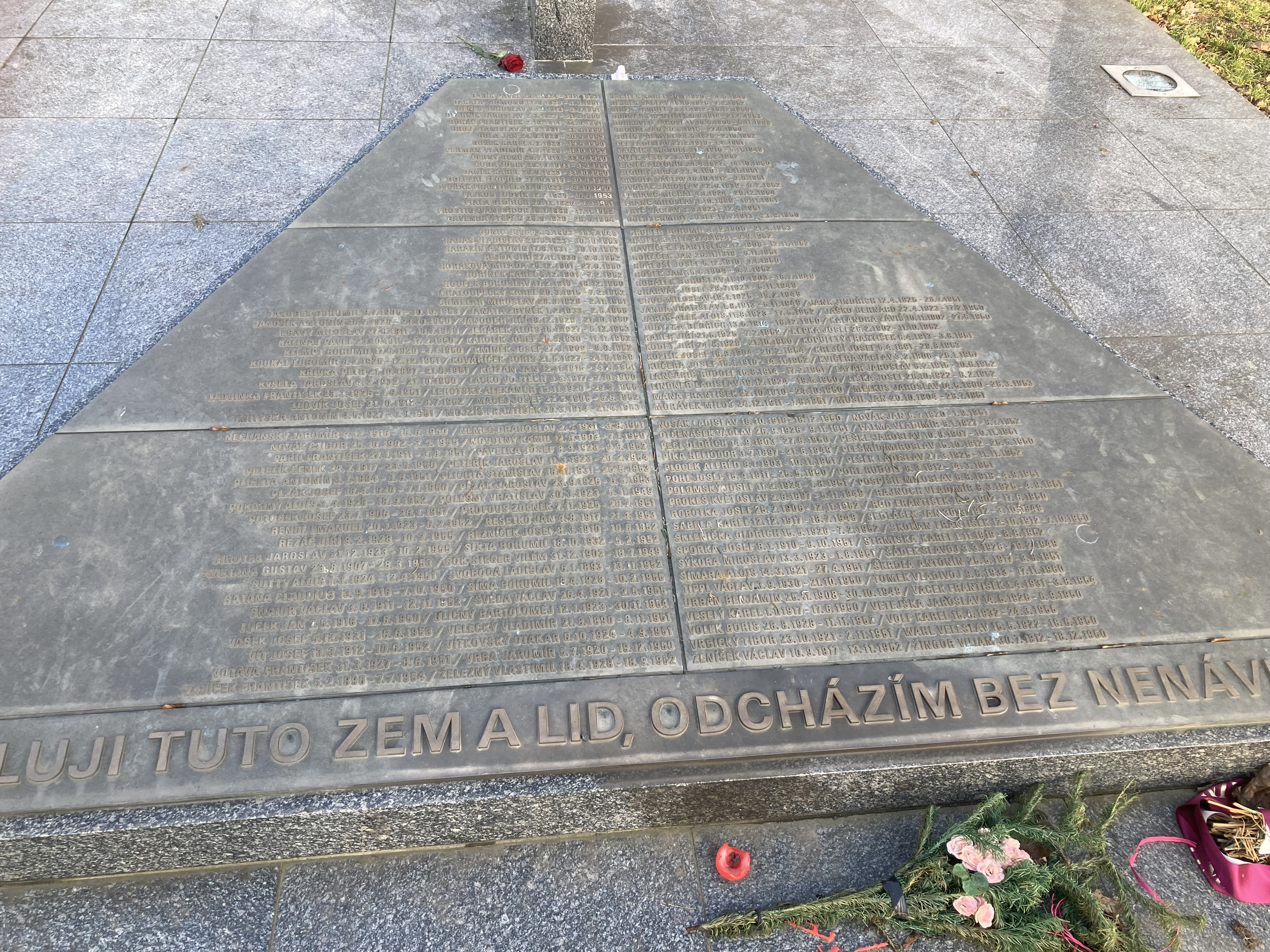
The list of victims inscribed on the monument, including Pecl's name

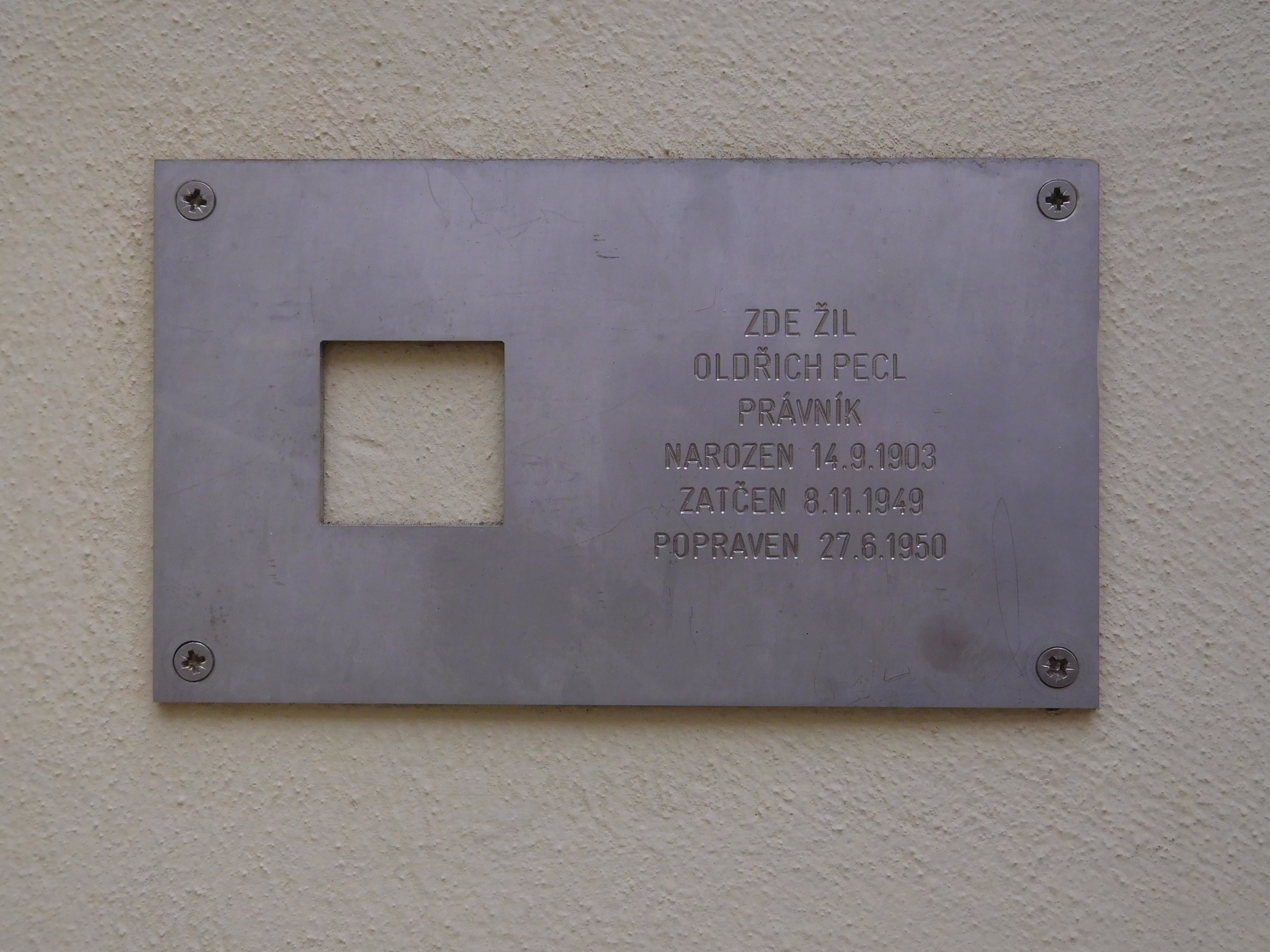
Last Address plaque on Pařížská Street in Prague

== See also ==
- Ludmila Brožová-Polednová
