= Lumir =

Lumir or Lumír may refer to:

- Lumír, a literary magazine in the Czech Republic, named after a bard of Czech legend.
- Lumír and Píseň, a sculpture of the bard, who is often depicted alongside a representation of "Song".
- Lumír Ondřej Hanuš
- Lumír and Píseň
- Lumír Kiesewetter
- Lumír Krejčí
- Lumír Mistr
- Lumír Sedláček
