= Vlasta (magazine) =

Women's magazine in the Czech Republic

- Categories: Women's magazine
- Frequency: Weekly
- Founder: Milada Horáková
- Founded: 1947
- Country: The Czech Republic
- Based in: Prague
- Language: Czech
- Website: Vlasta

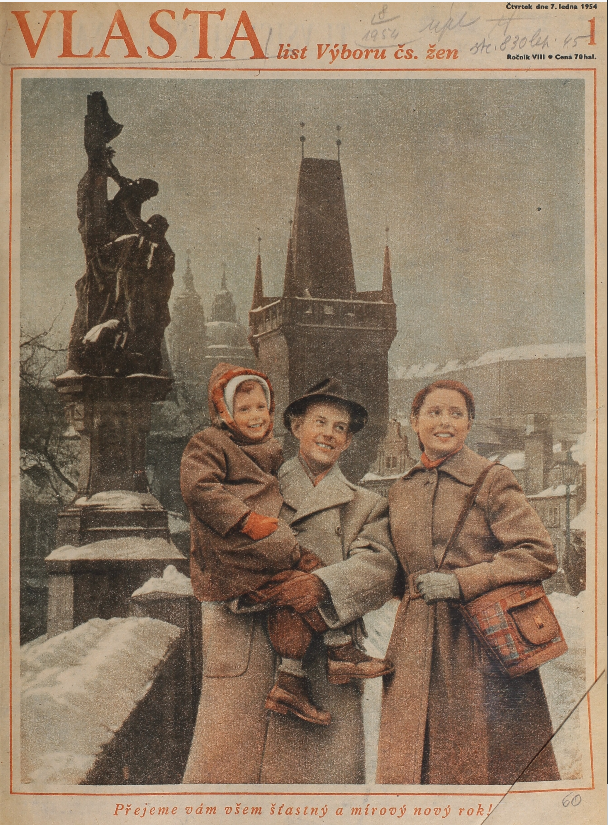
1954 issue

Vlasta is a weekly women's magazine which has been in circulation since 1947. The magazine is headquartered in Prague, the Czech Republic. Its title is a reference to a female warrior from an Old Czech legend. It was the most popular publication of the Communist era in the country.

== History and profile ==
Vlasta was established by Milada Horáková in 1947. Its establishment was supported by the Council of Czech Women which was a commission of experts. The cover of its first issue featured Edvard Beneš and his wife Hana Beneš. It is published on a weekly basis.

During the Communist period Vlasta was under the state control via the Czechoslovak Women's Union (CSWU). The CSWU was also its publisher. From the late 1960s it became relatively less dependent on the CSWU. During this period it covered articles on feminism, but this phase ended in 1969 when the magazine was subject to strict censorship. Vlasta reinforced the goals of the state in regard to the increase of the birth rate and diminishing the women's burden of formal labor and domestic work. In line with the former the magazine published anti-abortion articles in the 1950s and 1960s. It published the memos of the CSWU functioning as its spokesman.

Vlasta had the second highest circulation in 1968 after the Rudé právo newspaper. As a result, its page number was increased from 16 to 32 in February 1968. The magazine enjoyed higher levels of circulation until 1989. Then it began to be published by a private company.

As of 2006 Vlasta was described as a conservative women's magazine focusing on topics related to the roles of women's as a mother and a spouse.
