= Ludmila Brožová-Polednová =

Czech lawyer and public prosecutor (1921–2015)

- Born: 20 December 1921; Prague, Czechoslovakia
- Died: 15 January 2015 (aged 93); Prague, Czech Republic
- Occupation: State prosecutor

Ludmila Brožová-Polednová (born Ludmila Biedermannová; 20 December 1921 – 15 January 2015) was a Czech state prosecutor (public procurator) sentenced at age 86 in September 2008 to six years' imprisonment for her participation in the show trials of Milada Horáková and others in 1950, which led to at least four executions.

Brožová-Polednová was the only person sentenced in association with the political purges and repressions conducted by the ruling Communist Party in Czechoslovakia in the 1950s.

== Biography ==
Biedermannová was born in Prague in 1921. From 1948 until 1949, she studied at the Workers' Law School (Czech: Právnická škola pracujících). In summer 1950, Biedermannová participated as a "workers' prosecutor" in a show trial against a group accused of conspiracy against the state, which was allegedly led by Milada Horáková, an opposition politician and former prisoner of Nazi concentration camps.

The trial resulted in four death sentences and four life sentences. Brožová-Polednová, a colleague of Josef Urválek and others, actively participated in the trial and was present during the execution itself. Záviš Kalandra, Jan Buchal, and Oldřich Pecl were the other victims of the trial. The trial was later called "one of the most atrocious events in the nation's history" by Czech Television.

In 1952, she graduated from the Faculty of Law of Charles University in Prague and later worked in Plzeň. As the sole surviving participant of the trial, Brožová-Polednová was charged and tried in 2008 after the fall of the Communist regime in Czechoslovakia. She was sentenced to six years' imprisonment, beginning March 2009 at Věznice Plzeň. At that time, she was the oldest jailed person in the country. She was released by an amnesty granted by President Václav Klaus in December 2010, due to her age and health.

== Death ==
Brožová-Polednová died on 15 January 2015 in Prague at the age of 93. However, news of her death was announced only on 24 January.
