= Maidens' War (play) =

1985 play by František Ringo Čech

Maidens' War (Czech: Dívčí válka) is a 1985 Czechoslovak play by František Ringo Čech, inspired by the legend of the same name. It has been described as the third most successful Czech play after Strakonický dudák and Lucerna.

== Plot ==
Prince Přemysl grieves following the death of his wife, Princess Libuše. Vlasta flirted with the prince.

== Productions ==
Eduard Sedlář directed a production at the Semafor Theatre in Prague, starring Oldřich Navrátil as Prince Přemysl, and also featuring the playwright, František Ringo Čech, in the role of Youngster Ctirad. By 2013 the play had already been performed more than 3,000 times.
