= Josef Václav Myslbek =

Czech sculptor (1848–1922)

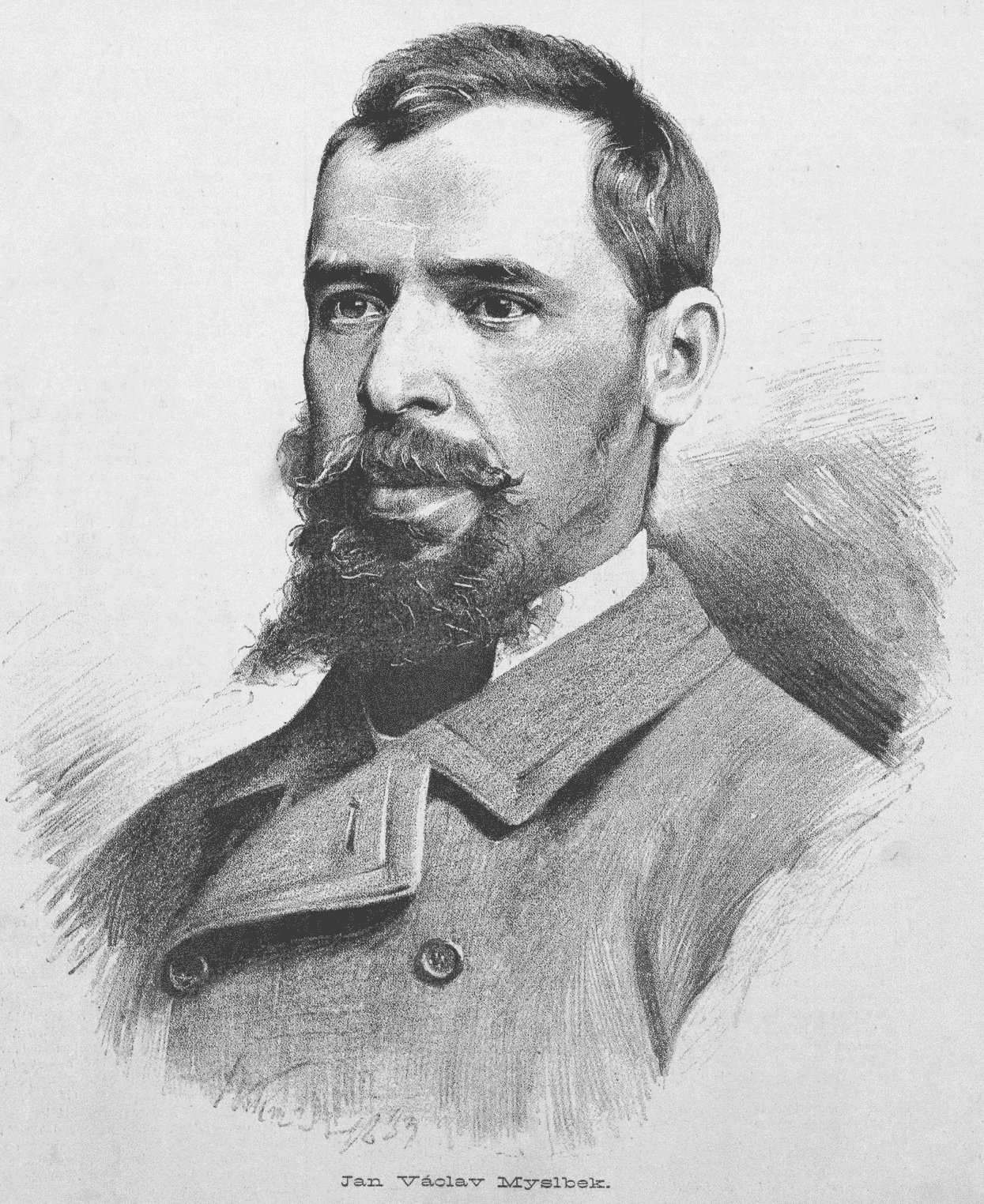
J. V. Myslbek, by Jan Vilímek (1883)

Josef Václav Myslbek (20 June 1848 – 2 June 1922) was a Czech sculptor and medalist credited with founding the modern Czech sculpting style. He was born and did much of his work when the area was Bohemia.

== Life ==
Josef grew up poor in a suburb of Prague. His family pushed him to become a shoemaker but he shirked the duty by getting a job with a succession of Czech sculptors. There was no school program for sculpting so he studied painting at the Academy of Fine Arts in Prague instead. Afterwards he opened his own sculpting studio. He became greatly inspired by the French sculpting style as well as related arts such as photography and literature. Josef Václav Myslbek influenced an entire generation of Czech sculptors and his students include Stanislav Sucharda, Jan Štursa and Bohumil Kafka. Myslbek is buried in Prague's National Cemetery.

== Works ==
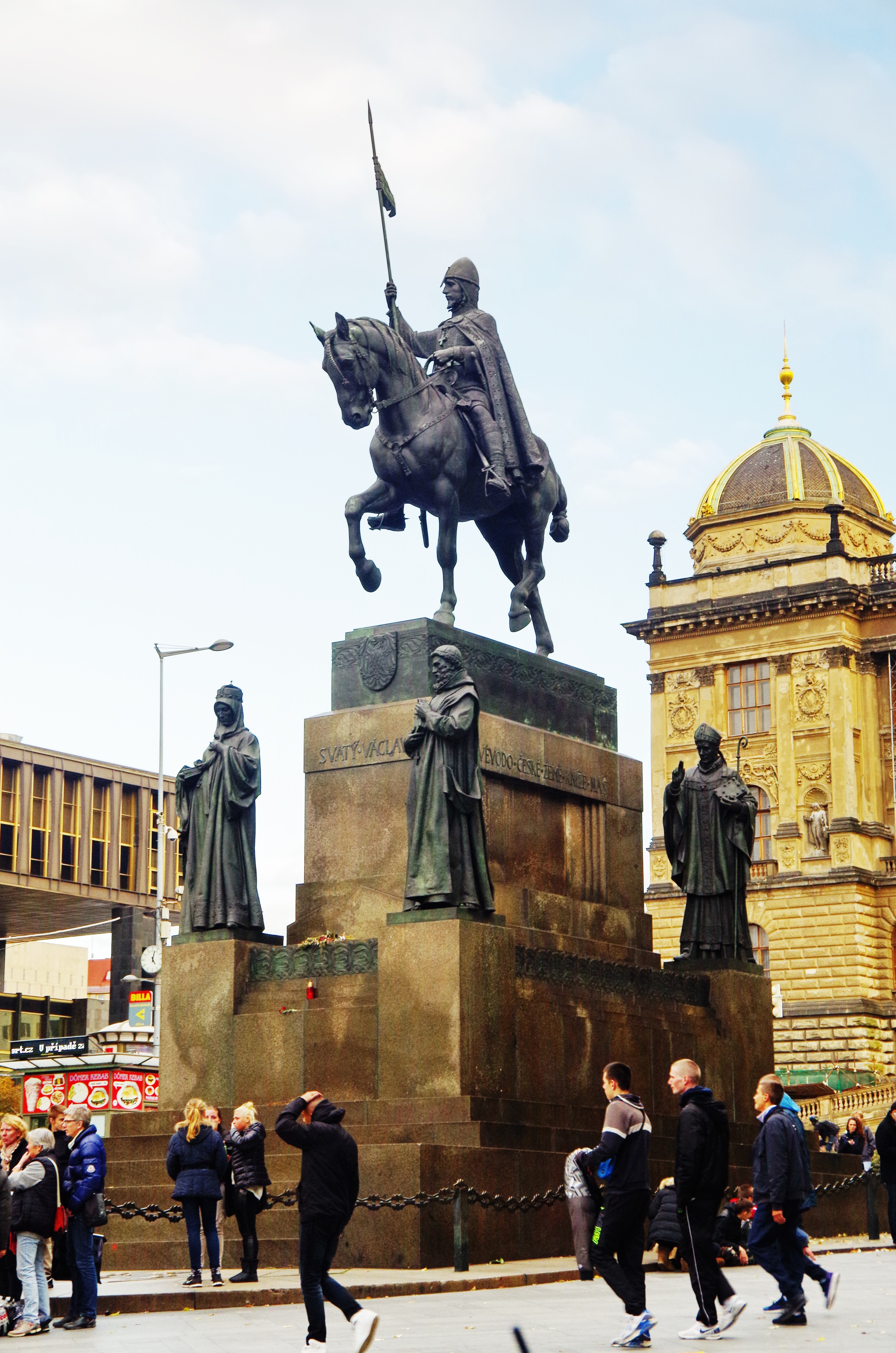
Statue of Saint Wenceslas, Wenceslas Square (2013)

Myslbek's most famous work is the Statue of Saint Wenceslas, which is located in the center of Wenceslas Square. It took him over 20 years to complete but has since become one of Prague's most recognizable landmarks and a symbol of Czech statehood.

In 1871, Myslbek produced some of his greater works including a commission to do a set of statues for the National Theater. Later he would do busts and monuments of several famous Czechs such as Bedřich Smetana and František Palacký.

His four pairs of statues for the Palacký Bridge have been relocated to the Vyšehrad:

- Libuše and Přemysl, depicts Přemysl, the Ploughman and Libuše
- Lumír and Píseň , depicts Lumír (a legendary bard) and Píseň ("song")
- Záboj and Slavoj, heroic brothers from the "Rukopis královédvorský"
- Ctirad and Šárka, characters from The Maidens' War, a traditional Bohemian tale
