= Libuše and Přemysl =

Sculpture in Prague, Czech Republic

- Libuše a Přemysl (Czech)
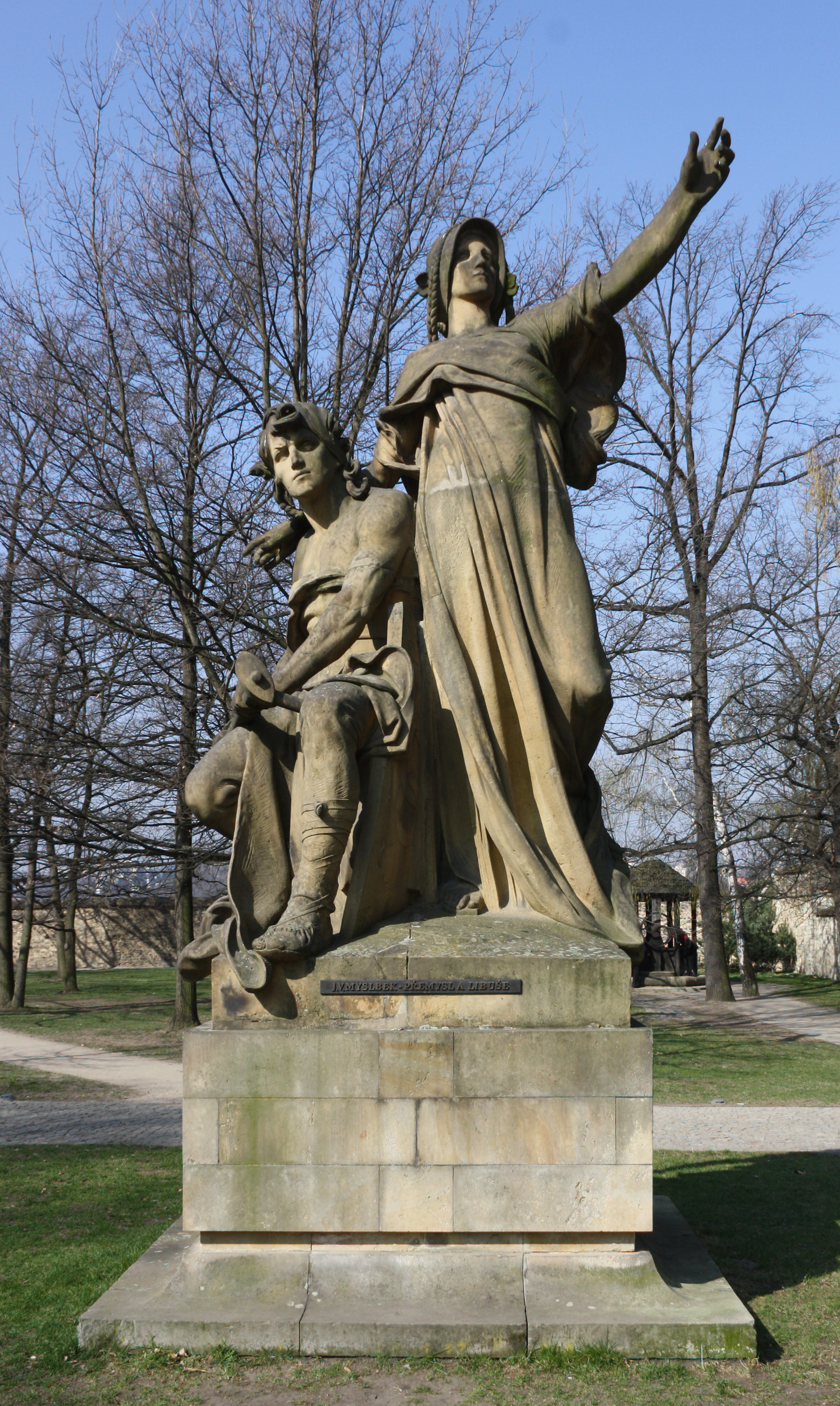
- The sculpture in 2012
- Artist: Josef Václav Myslbek
- Type: Sculpture
- Location: Prague, Czech Republic; 50°3′50.6″N 14°25′2.79″E

Libuše and Přemysl (Czech: Libuše a Přemysl) is an outdoor sculpture by Josef Václav Myslbek made in 1889-1897 for Palacký Bridge. Damaged from American bombing on February 14, 1945, bridge statues were removed in 1948 in connection with the bridge reconstruction and installed at Vyšehradské sady in Vyšehrad, Prague, Czech Republic. The statue was one at the New Town's side of Vltava and it was heavily damaged and repaired until reinstalled with the other three only in 1977. It depicts Přemysl the Ploughman and Libuše, the mythical Czech rulers settled in the 8th century at Vyšehrad.

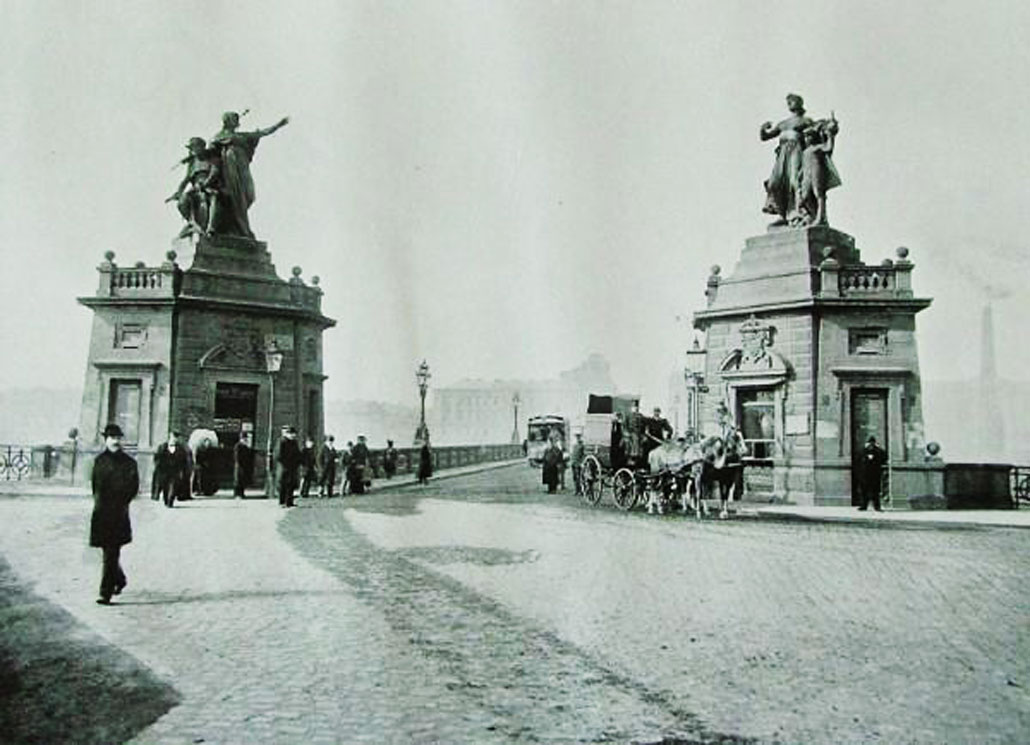
19th century photo
