= The Pagan Queen =

2009 film by Constantin Werner

- Directed by: Constantin Werner
- Screenplay by: Constantin Werner, Lance Daly
- Produced by: Constantin Werner, Maria Schram
- Starring: Winter Ave Zoli, Csaba Lucas, Lea Mornar
- Cinematography: Bobby Bukowski
- Edited by: Roberto Silvi
- Music by: Benedikt Brydern
- Production company: Amok Film
- Distributed by: Vanguard Cinema (U.S.), Atyp (Czech Republic)
- Release date: 2009
- Running time: 97 minutes
- Countries: Czech Republic; United States
- Language: English

The Pagan Queen is a 2009 fantasy drama film directed by German director Constantin Werner. The film combines realism with fantasy elements and is based on the legend of Libuše, the Czech tribal queen of 8th century Bohemia who envisioned the city of Prague and founded the first Czech dynasty with a farmer called Přemysl, the Ploughman.

== Plot ==
After her father, the great chieftain Krok (Ivo Novák) dies, the tribes of the Bohemian forests elect his youngest daughter Libuše (Winter Ave Zoli) as their new ruler. Together with her two beautiful sisters, the healer Kazi (Veronika Bellová) and the priestess Teta (Vera Filatova) and an army of women under the command of her best friend, the Amazon Vlasta (Lea Mornar), Libuše guides her people with the power of her visionary abilities. A seer by nature, she can travel into the Otherworld, the land of the death, from where she returns with predictions of the future and answers for people in need.

During her reign Libuse envisions the city of Prague at the Vltava river, starts mining in the rich Bohemian mountains and helps her farmers to fight a deadly plague. She also starts a secret affair with the charismatic ploughman Přemysl (Csaba Lucas).

When the peaceful community of farmers is under attack by raiders and split into different parties of power hungry landowners under the guidance of their plotting chieftains Domaslav (Pavel Kríz) and Vrsovec (Marek Vašut), Libuše is eventually forced into marriage by her own people. Desperate, she elects Přemysl to become her husband and king. Soon Přemysl takes over the new kingdom and rules with an iron fist, enslaving the formerly free farmers.

But Libuše's friend Vlasta, who loves her since childhood, refuses to follow the new leader and with her maiden army declares war on the men of Bohemia. After Vlasta kills Ctirad (Mirek Hrabé), a popular warrior, and blinds Domaslav, Přemysl meets Vlasta in a showdown and kills her. At the same time Libuše gives birth to his son Nezamysl.

The film ends with Libuše diving into the river Vltava which symbolizes her becoming a legend.

== Cast ==
Role	Actor
Libuše	Winter Ave Zoli
Přemysl	Csaba Lucas
Vlasta	Lea Mornar
Kazi	Veronika Bellová
Teta	Vera Filatova
Vršovec	Marek Vašut
Domaslav	Pavel Kříž
Ctirad	Mirek Hrabě
The Emissary of Vyšehrad	Daniel Brown
Krok	Ivo Novák
Šárka	Mirka Koštanová
Roxhon	Marko Ingonda

== Story sources ==
The English language screenplay by Irish writer/director Lance Daly and director Constantin Werner was based on the 18th and 19th century romantic German fairytales and plays by Johann Karl August Musäus, Clemens Brentano and Franz Grillparzer who emphasize the supernatural elements of the story and combine that with psychology and philosophy, as well as on the 1894 publication Old Bohemian Legends (Staré pověsti české) by Czech author Alois Jirásek.

The film recreates the pagan, pre-Christian time period of the so-called Dark Ages and shows the transition from a pagan matriarchate to a modern patriarchate. It is also a passionate love story between two lovers from different social status, a queen and a ploughman, who meet in a time when the old ways of the Slavic tribes were coming to an end.

== Locations ==
The entire film was shot on location in the Czech Republic using reconstructions of Slavic settlements for the buildings in the story.

== Release history and critical reception ==
The film had its premiere at the October 2009 Estepona Fantastic Film Festival/Spain where it won the Silver Unicorn award for best original film music.

It was released theatrically in the Czech Republic in October 2009 by Atyp Film where it ran in movie theaters until January 2010. Since then it has been sold to over a dozen countries. It was released in Russia and the Russian speaking countries on DVD November 2009 by Lizard Trade and in the US on June 29, 2010, by Vanguard Cinema. It was released in the German-speaking countries on September 9, 2010, by Eurovideo and in Australia and New Zealand February 23, 2011 by Gryphon Entertainment.

The critical reception in the Czech Republic was very negative. Many Czech critics like Frantisek Fuka attacked every aspect of the film, some even the hair color of the lead actress, as they didn't feel that the film represented their traditional view of the story and characters. The film was also rejected by the Karlovy Vary International Film Festival.

In the United States the film's reception was much better. Ian Jane from AV Maniacs called it "a nicely made picture with some beautiful camera work and strong performances. It plays around with some interesting themes quite effectively and makes for a decidedly different type of film all together" and the Pagan Newswire Collective called it "a beautiful and realistic look at early medieval paganism".

== Music ==
The orchestral score for The Pagan Queen was written by German composer Benedikt Brydern and recorded in Prague with a full symphonic orchestra. The main theme of the film was quoted from Antonín Leopold Dvořák, Romance in F minor, Op. 11.The score won the Silver Unicorn Award for Best Music at the 10th Estepona International Horror and Fantasy Film Festival in Estepona, Spain in 2009.

== 2018 New version ==
The film was remastered with a new director's cut in 2018 and is now included in Amazon Prime and other streaming services.
