= Ctirad and Šárka =

- Ctirad a Šárka (Czech)
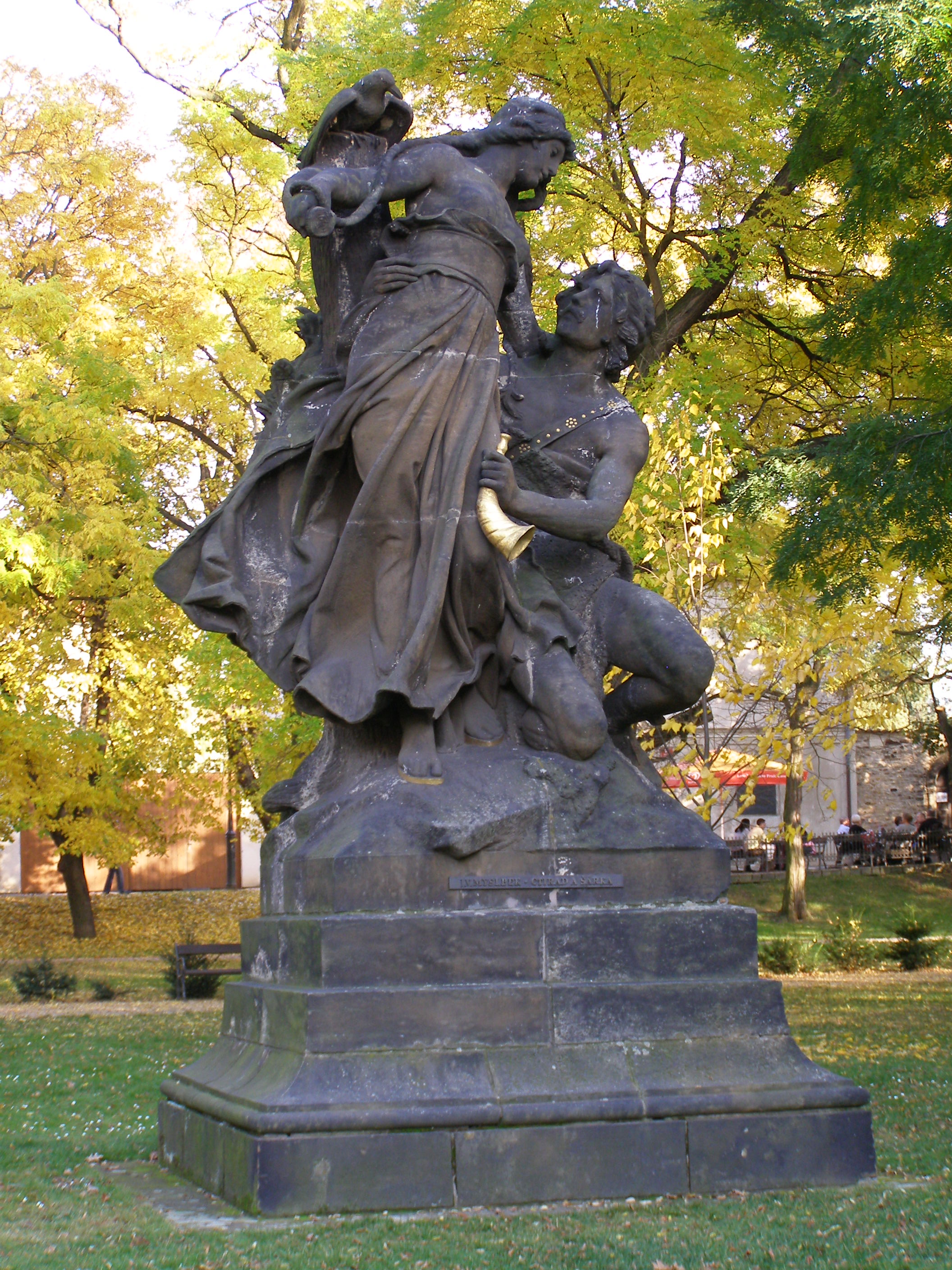
- The sculpture in 2008
- Artist: Josef Václav Myslbek
- Type: Sculpture
- Location: Prague, Czech Republic; 50°3′50.02″N 14°25′5.73″E

Ctirad and Šárka (Czech: Ctirad a Šárka) is an outdoor sculpture by Josef Václav Myslbek, installed at Vyšehradské sady in Vyšehrad, Prague, Czech Republic. It depicts Ctirad and Šárka of Slavic mythology and the Bohemian tale The Maidens' War, when women after the death of Libuše built the castle Děvín lying on the opposite hill of the Vyšehrad.
