= Záboj and Slavoj =

Sculpture in Prague, Czech Republic

- Záboj a Slavoj (Czech)
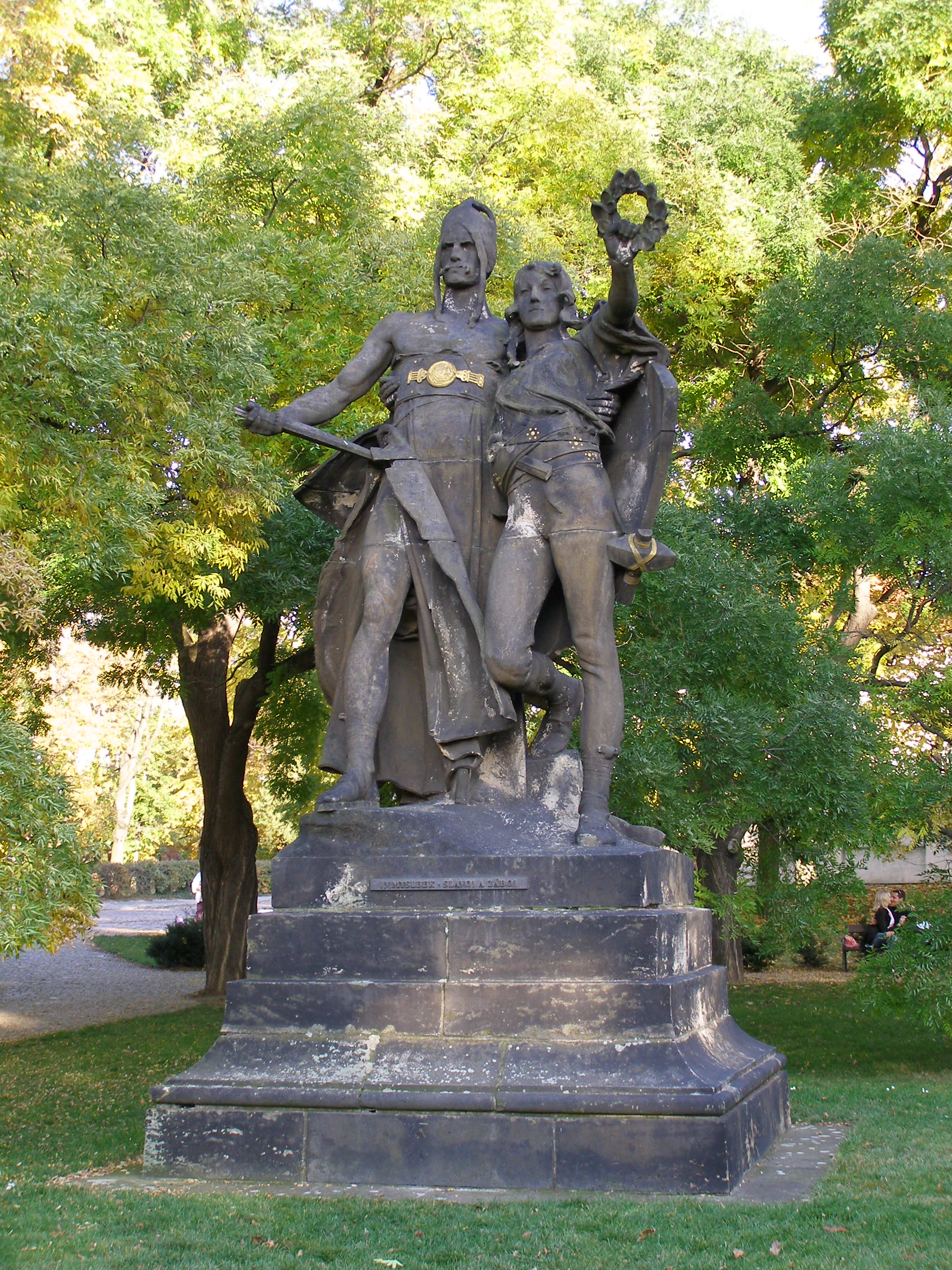
- The sculpture in 2008
- Artist: Josef Václav Myslbek
- Year: 1881
- Completion date: 1892
- Type: Sculpture
- Location: Prague, Czech Republic; 50°3′50.48″N 14°25′5.73″E

Záboj and Slavoj (Czech: Záboj a Slavoj) is an outdoor sculpture by Josef Václav Myslbek, installed at Vyšehradské sady in Vyšehrad, Prague, Czech Republic.

It depicts the heroic brothers from the manuscripts of Dvůr Králové and of Zelená Hora. The brothers were leaders of the rebellion against the invasion of the German troops of Charlemagne and allegedly led the victorious battle in 805.
