= Communication Workers Union =

Communication Workers Union may mean:

- Communication Workers Union of Australia
- Communication Workers' Union (Ireland)
- Communication Workers' Union (Italy)
- Communication Workers Union (South Africa)
- Communication Workers Union (Trinidad and Tobago)
- Communication Workers Union (United Kingdom)
- Communication Workers of America
- Communications Workers' Union (Ghana)

== See also ==
- Union of Communication Workers
