= Dead Leaves (1998 film) =

1998 American film by Constantin Werner

- Directed by: Constantin Werner
- Screenplay by: Constantin Werner
- Produced by: Constantin Werner
- Starring: Haim Abramsky, Elizabeth Gondek
- Cinematography: Mindaugas Blaudziunas
- Edited by: Scott Cookson
- Music by: Rozz Williams, Gitane Damone
- Production company: Amok Film
- Distributed by: Cult Epics (U.S.)
- Release date: 1998
- Running time: 80 Min.
- Country: USA
- Language: English

Dead Leaves is a 1998 road movie directed by German director Constantin Werner about a young man who travels from New York City to West Virginia with the corpse of his deceased girlfriend. As she decomposes, he slips further into madness.

== Plot ==
When Laura (Elizabeth Gondek) dies, her unbalanced boyfriend Joey (Haim Abramsky) suffers a nervous breakdown. He steals the body and escapes on a self-destructive journey through a lonely autumn landscape of motels, freeways and rainy towns. At night he tries to preserve her fading beauty in strange rituals while remembering the happy and dark moments of their relationship. As she starts to decay physically, he descends mentally and emotionally. When he reaches the ocean shore he shoots himself to be united with her.

== Cast ==
- Joey - Haim Abramsky
- Laura - Elizabeth Gondek

== Poetry and music in the film ==
The film uses famous morbid poems recited as voice over as part of the narrative structure. The poems include "Annabel Lee" by Edgar Allan Poe and works by Baudelaire, Nerval, and Georg Trakl. Images of these poets as well as images of the musicians Rozz Williams and Ian Curtis are cut into the title sequence. The film's soundtrack includes a version of the previously unpublished ballad "Flowers" by Christian Death founder Rozz Williams. The song "Ship of Fools" was composed exclusively for the film's opening title sequence by singer/songwriter Gitane Demone.

== Locations ==
The film was shot during a two-week road trip from New York City to West Virginia using a guerrilla filmmaking approach.

== Release history ==
The film had its US premiere at the 1998 film festival of the American Film Institute in Los Angeles. It won the award "Best Film EXPO 1998" at the 1998 Festival Internacional de Cinema da Figueira da Foz in Portugal and was shown at the 1999 Mar del Plata International Film Festival and the 1999 Gothenburg Film Festival.

It was released in the US by underground distributor Cult Epics and Rykodisc in 2005.
