= Constantin Werner =

German artist, writer, director and producer

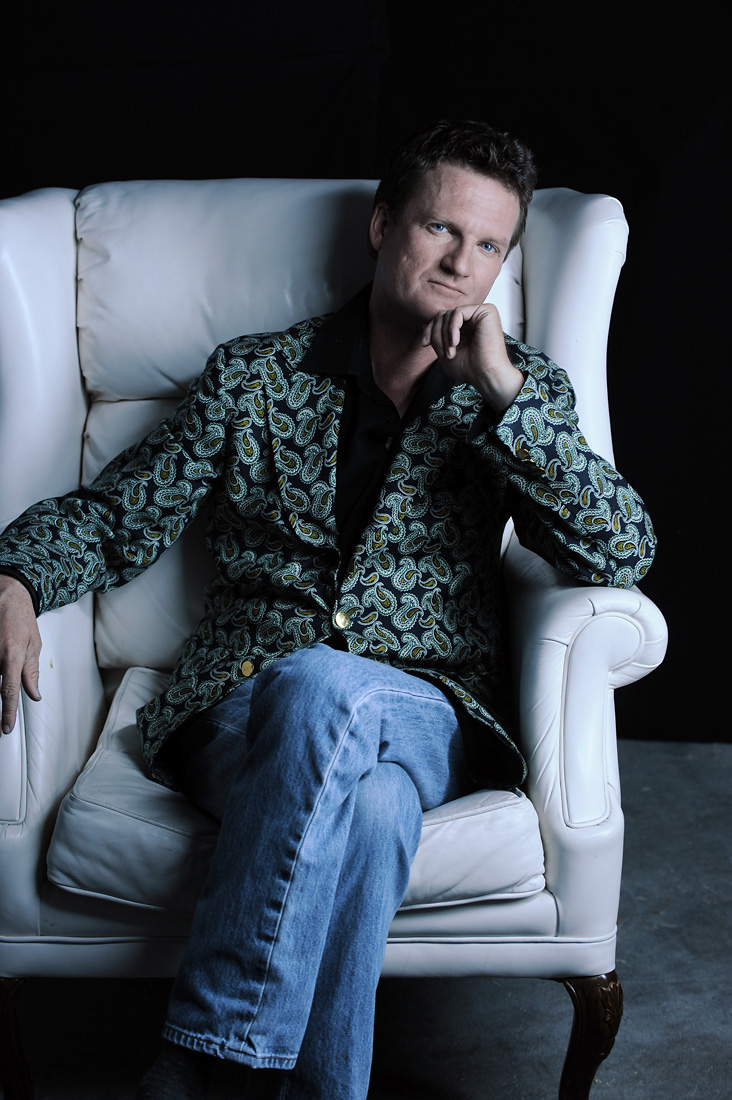
- Born: January 3, 1969 (age 57); Erlangen, Germany
- Occupations: Director; Screenwriter; Producer
- Years active: 1994–present
- Website: http://www.rusalkafilm.com

Constantin Werner (born January 3, 1969, Erlangen) is a German artist, writer, director and producer of film, TV, theater and music videos.

Constantin Werner's first feature film Dead Leaves had its premiere at the 1998 AFI International Film Festival in Los Angeles. The same year it received the award for Best Feature Film EXPO 1998 at the Figuera da Foz International Film Festival in Portugal. In 1999 it was screened at the Mar del Plata International Film Festival in Argentina, the Gothenburg International Film Festival in Sweden and the Beta 2.0 Film Festival in Berlin. Dead Leaves was released in the US by Cult Epics/RYKO/Time Warner in May 2005.

His second feature film The Pagan Queen (2009), a historic drama with fantasy elements based on the legend of Libuše, the Slavic queen of 8th century Bohemia, was released theatrically in the Czech Republic in October 2009 after its premiere at the Estepona Fantastic Film Festival in Spain, where it won the Silver Unicorn award for best original score. Since then the film has been released in over a dozen countries including the United States, Canada, Australia, Germany and Russia.

Constantin Werner's producing credits include the action TV-series Puma for the German network RTL, the independent film Fireflies (starring Kate Mara, Dan Frazer and Isabel Glasser) and the 2004 Cult Epics release Bettie Page: Dark Angel. His stage directing credits include his play Box for the New York City theater La MaMa ETC in 1996, and the 2002 West Coast premiere of Pulitzer Prize nominee Adam Rapp's play Blackbird at Theater Theater, Los Angeles.

He is the script writer and one of the producers of the fantasy feature film In the Lost Lands, which was filmed in 2022 in Poland and released theatrically worldwide in 2025. In the Lost Lands is based on a story by George R. R. Martin, adapted by Constantin Werner and Paul W. S. Anderson who also directed. It stars Milla Jovovich and Dave Bautista.

His next feature film is the dark fantasy indie feature Kobold, starring Eric Nelsen, Maille-Rose Smith, Lynn Favin and Susanna Guzman. The film was shoot in New York City in 2025. Post will be completed in late 2026. Release planned for 2027.

His music video credits include works for the LA bands Scarling, Versailles (musician), Gliss, The Deep Eynde, Punk Bunny, Jasmine Ash and the Sixth Chamber.

The first public showing of his artwork was at the Red Dot Miami Art Fair December 2019 through blu Egg Interiors & Art Gallery. This was followed in December 2020 by his first solo art exhibition Lost Souls with Wönzimer Gallery, Los Angeles and the 2021 group show Salon de Imperfectionism. His second solo exhibition World in Ashes with Wönzimer Gallery opened in July 2024. In 2025 he participated in the group show Drawing from Imperfectionism again with Wonzimer Gallery In 2026 he participated in a second installement of Drawing from Imperfectionism, this time at Bbam! Gallery, Montreal.

He is the creator and writer of the graphic novel One Night in Prague, which was illustrated by Tadd Galusha. The book was picked up by Keenspot and was at first sold in three separate comic issues in 2022. The full length version will be published by Simon & Schuster in December 2024.
