= Bombing of Prague =

Aerial attacks by the Allies on German-occupied Prague during WWII

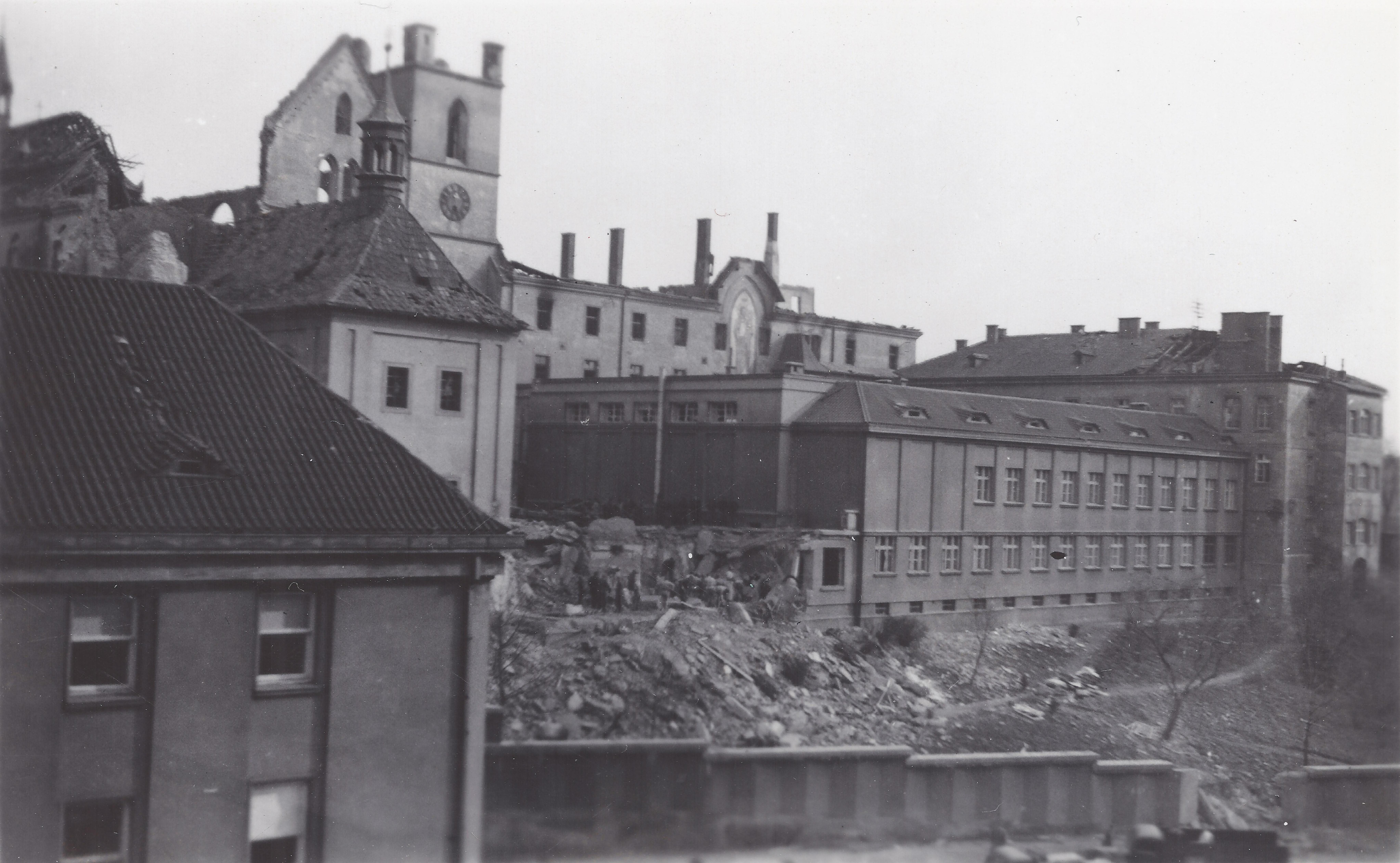
Bombing damage to Emmaus Monastery

Prague, the capital and largest city of the German-occupied Protectorate of Bohemia and Moravia, was bombed several times by the Allies during World War II. The first Allied aircraft to fly over Prague was a single bomber of the French Air Force in April 1940, but it dropped propaganda leaflets, not bombs. The first bombing mission was flown by the Royal Air Force (RAF) in October 1941. Prague was then bombed three times by the United States Army Air Forces between the fall of 1944 and spring of 1945. During the Prague uprising of 5–9 May 1945, the Luftwaffe made use of bombers against the rebels.

The bombing of Prague cost 1,200 lives. Ten surviving high-quality reconnaissance photographs allow a detailed assessment of the damage caused by the raids. The first two USAAF raids were accidental. The raids were used for anti-American propaganda purposes, both by the Nazis and the subsequent Communist regime in Czechoslovakia.

== 5 October 1941 ==
On 5 October 1941, air raid sirens went off in Prague between 01:16 and 03:15 in the morning. RAF bombers dropped about four firebombs over the city.

== 15 November 1944 ==
At noon on 15 November 1944, an estimated twelve bombs were dropped by two aircraft of unknown origin (probably American) on the municipal power plant (about 300 metres west of today's Nádraží Holešovice metro station). The facilities were undamaged. Four bombs exploded in front of an outhouse, however, injuring fifteen employees. In nearby homes, people standing by windows were said to have been killed by splinters. About three bombs fell into the coal stockpile of the power plant and were later defused.

The November bombing was probably unintentional. An attack on ČKD factories in Vysočany and Libeň was planned for October 30, but never took place.

== 14 February 1945 ==
=== Raid ===
On 14 February 1945, the US Army Air Forces carried out an air raid over Prague. According to American pilots, it was the result of a navigation mistake: at the same time, a massive bombing of Dresden was under way, 120 km north-west from Prague.

Forty B-17 Flying Fortresses of the Eighth Army Air Force dropped about 152 tons of bombs on many populated areas of Prague. The carpet-bombing hit Vyšehrad, Zlíchov, Karlovo náměstí, Nusle, Vinohrady, Vršovice and Pankrác. The bombing resulted in the deaths of 701 people and the wounding of 1,184. About one hundred houses and historical sites were totally destroyed and another two hundred were heavily damaged. All the casualties were civilians and not one of the city's factories, which might have been of use to the Wehrmacht, was damaged.

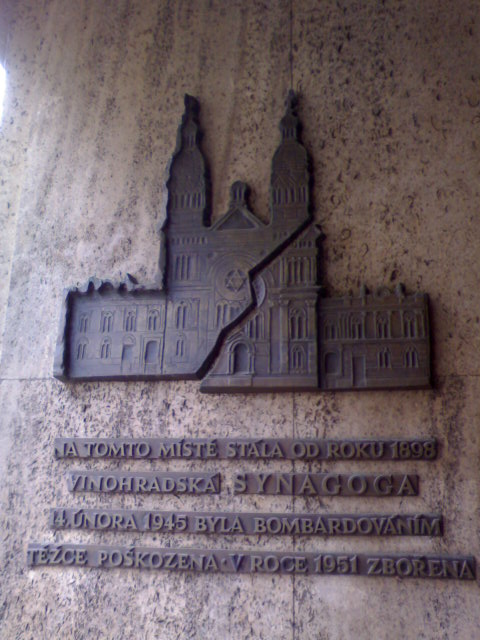
Plaque commemorating the bombing of the Vinohrady Synagogue

Many homes and national sites were destroyed, for example the Emmaus Monastery, Faust House and Vinohrady Synagogue. Some of Prague's famous modern buildings, such as the Dancing House or the Emauzy church, were constructed where bombs had destroyed previously existing buildings.

One of the pilots of the lead group, Lt. Andrew Andrako flying B-17 serial number 43-38652 V, "Stinker Jr." was of Czech descent.

=== Controversy ===
The American pilots have voiced their regret many times. The history of the 398th Bombardment Group based at RAF Nuthampstead, which carried out the raid, indicates the attack was an accident. The radar navigational equipment on the aircraft was not functioning correctly and high winds en route produced a dead reckoning navigational error of some 70 miles. This caused the formation to arrive over the supposed "target", which was believed to be Dresden, at the time bombing commenced. Prague was mostly obscured by broken clouds, with occasional glimpses of the Vltava river. Additionally, Prague and Dresden looked similar from the air, with rivers running through both cities. The bombing was carried out as a "blind attack" using radar.

After the war, the Americans were billed for some of the damages sustained by the historical buildings. The raid was used for anti-American propaganda purposes, both by the Nazis and the subsequent Communist regime in Czechoslovakia.

== 25 March 1945 ==
The only targeted attack on Prague was also the last and largest. It took place on Palm Sunday, 25 March 1945 and involved 650 bombers launched in Italy with fighter escorts. The attack was aimed at the ČKD factories in eastern Prague (mainly Vysočany) and the military airfields of Kbely, Letňany and Čakovice.

Sunday was chosen for the attack, according to the USAAF, to minimize human casualties in the factories. The weather was ideal. The attack took place in twelve waves of about 50 aircraft between 11:48 a.m. and 1:02 p.m. The Lockheed P-38 Lightning escort fighters shot down an Me 262 that crashed near Prague Zoo. The attack left 235 dead and 417 injured, as well as 90 buildings destroyed and 1,360 badly damaged.
