= Milada Horáková =

Czech politician and lawyer

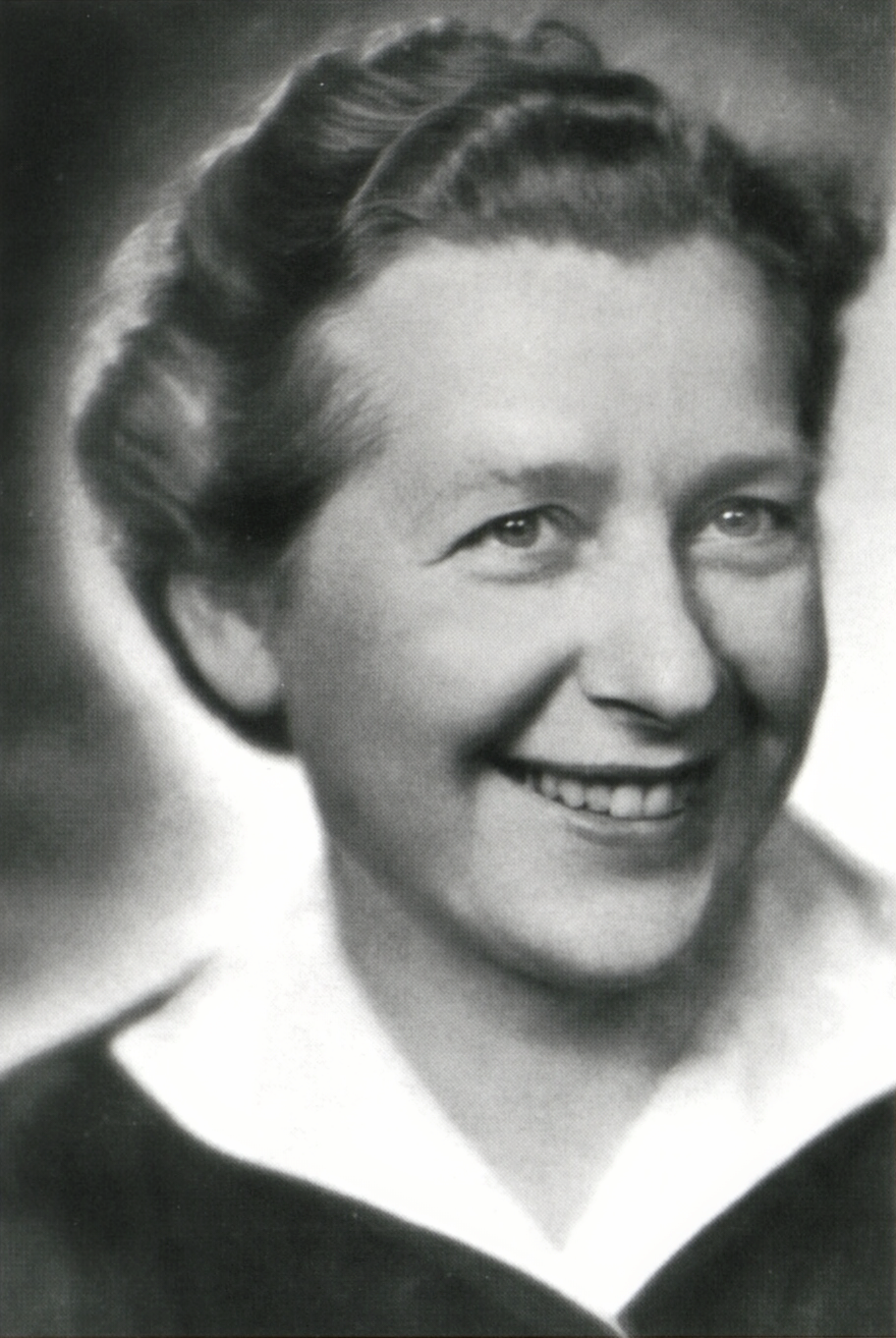

Personal details
- Born: Milada Králová; 25 December 1901 Prague, Austria-Hungary
- Died: 27 June 1950 (aged 48) Prague, Czechoslovakia
- Cause of death: Capital punishment by hanging
- Party: ČSNS
- Children: Jana Kánská
- Education: Charles University
- Occupation: lawyer, politician
- Awards: Order of Tomáš Garrigue Masaryk; Order of the White Double Cross

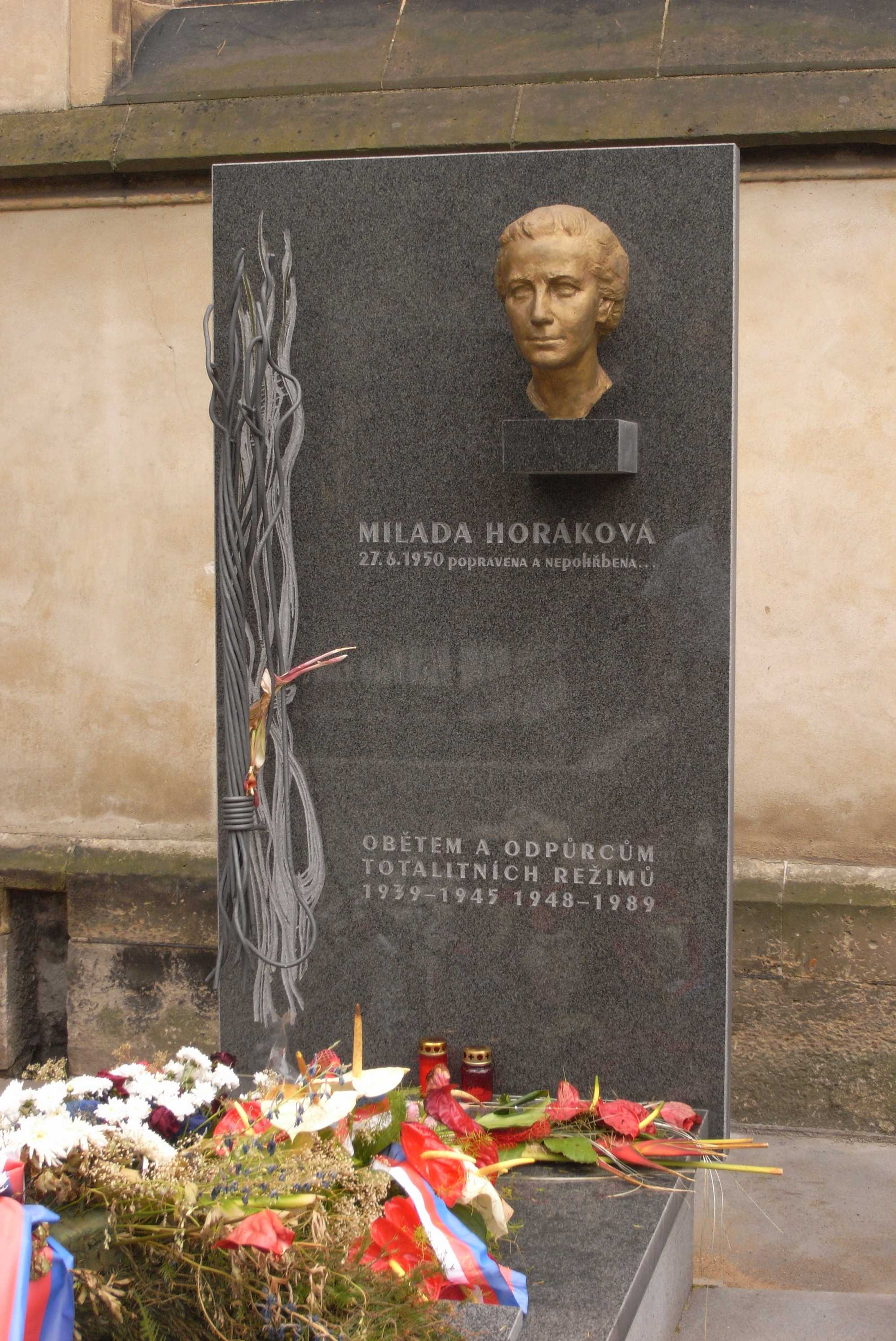
Memorial to Milada Horáková in the Vyšehrad Cemetery, Prague

Milada Horáková (née Králová; 25 December 1901 – 27 June 1950) was a Czech politician and a member of the underground resistance movement against Nazi Germany and then against the Communist Party of Czechoslovakia. She was focused on preserving democratic institutions and women's rights.

She was convicted by the Communist Party of Czechoslovakia on fabricated charges of conspiracy and treason and executed at Pankrác Prison in Prague in a judicial murder using a primitive variant of capital punishment by hanging with slow strangling; she was strangled for more than 13 minutes. She was cremated but her remains were never found.

Her conviction was annulled in 1968. She underwent political rehabilitation in the 1990s and posthumously received the Order of Tomáš Garrigue Masaryk (1st Class) and Order of the White Double Cross (1st Class). In September 2008, Ludmila Brožová-Polednová, the sole surviving member of the team that led to the execution of Horáková, was sentenced to prison.

== Early life ==
Horáková was born Milada Králová in Prague. At the age of 17, in the last year of the World War I, she was expelled from school for participating in an anti-war demonstration. She completed her secondary education in the newly formed Czechoslovakia and studied law at Charles University, graduating in 1926. Her early political life was influenced by senator Františka Plamínková, the Women's National Council founder.

Horáková married her husband Bohuslav Horák in 1927. Their daughter, Jana, was born in 1933.

From 1927 to 1940, she was employed in the social welfare department of the Prague city authority. In addition to focusing on social justice issues, Horáková became a prominent campaigner for the equal status of women. She was also active in the Czechoslovak Red Cross. In 1929, she joined the Czech National Social Party which, despite the similarity in names, was a strong opponent of Nazism.

== Wartime resistance ==
During the Occupation of Czechoslovakia (1938–1945), Horáková was active in the underground resistance movement. Together with her husband, she was arrested and interrogated by the Gestapo in 1940, in her case because of her pre-war political activity. She was sent to the ghetto at Terezín and then to various prisons in Germany.

In the summer of 1944, Horáková was sentenced to 8 years imprisonment in Bavaria. She was released in April 1945 by advancing United States forces near the end of World War II.

== Political activity ==
Following the liberation of Czechoslovakia in 1945, Horáková returned to Prague and joined the leadership of the re-constituted Czech National Social Party. She became a member of the Provisional National Assembly. In 1946, she won a seat in the elected National Assembly representing the region of České Budějovice in southern Bohemia.

Her political activities again focused on enhancing the role of women in society and preserving Czechoslovakia's democratic institutions. She founded a women's magazine, Vlasta, in 1947. Shortly after the 1948 Czechoslovak coup d'état, she resigned from the parliament in protest. Unlike many of her political associates, Horáková chose not to leave Czechoslovakia for the West, and continued to be politically active in Prague. On 27 September 1949, she was arrested and accused of being the leader of an alleged plot to overthrow the Communist regime.

== Trial and execution ==
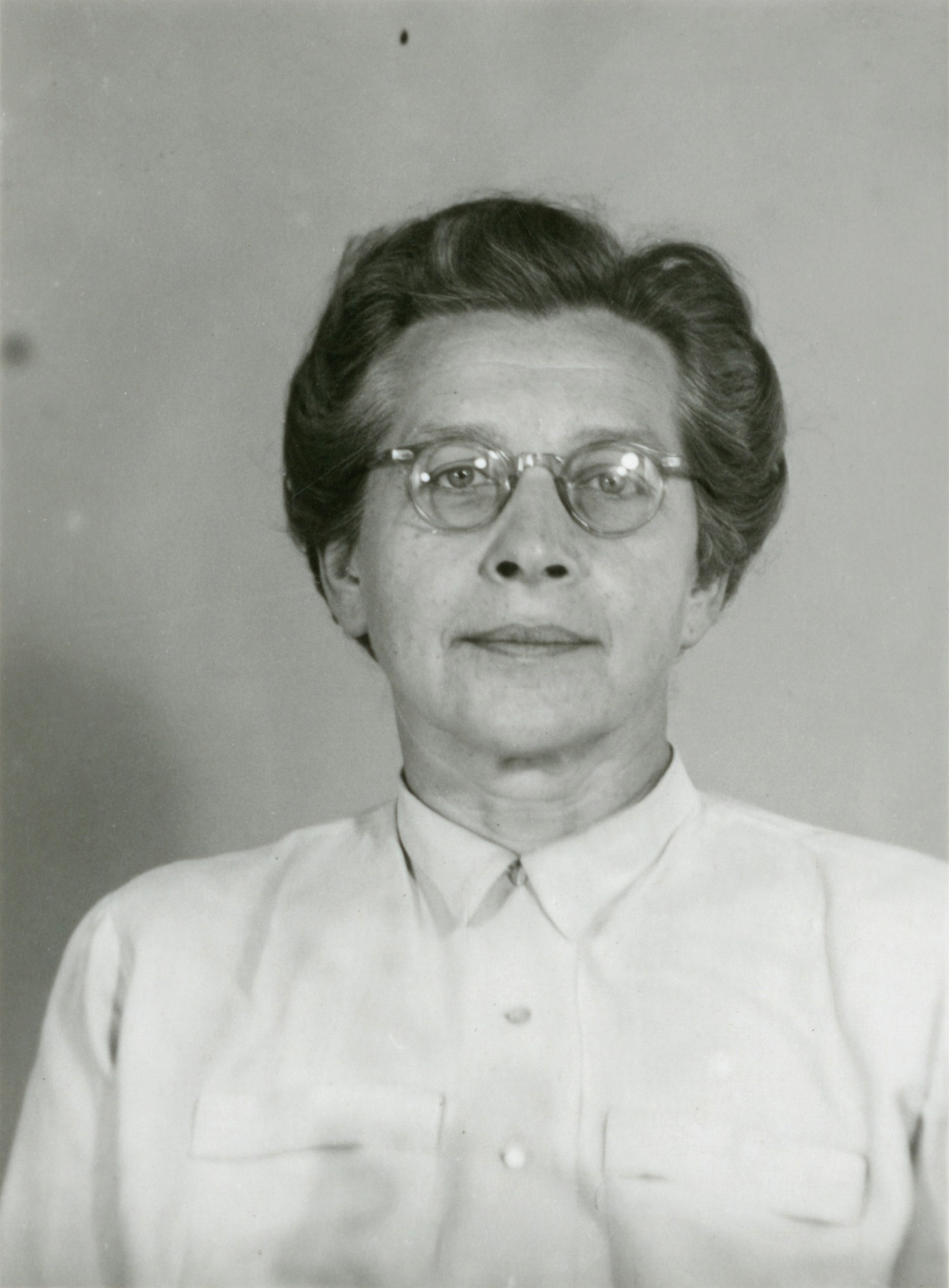
Mugshot of Milada Horáková

Before facing trial, Horáková and her co-defendants were subjected to intensive interrogation by the StB, the Czechoslovak state security organ, using both physical and psychological torture. She was accused of leading a conspiracy to commit treason and espionage at the behest of the United States, Great Britain, France and Yugoslavia. Evidence of the alleged conspiracy included Horáková's presence at a meeting of political figures from the National Social, Social Democratic, and People's parties, in September 1948, held to discuss their response to the new political situation in Czechoslovakia. She was also accused of maintaining contacts with Czechoslovak political figures in exile in the West.

The trial of Horáková and twelve of her colleagues began on 31 May 1950. It was intended to be a show trial and was supervised by Soviet advisors and accompanied by a public campaign, organised by the Communist authorities, demanding the death penalty for the accused. The State's prosecutors were led by Josef Urválek and included Ludmila Brožová-Polednová. The trial proceedings were carefully orchestrated with confessions of guilt secured from the accused.

A recording of the event, discovered in 2005, revealed Horáková's courageous defence of her political ideals. Invoking the values of Czechoslovakia's democratic presidents, Tomáš Garrigue Masaryk and Edvard Beneš, she declared that "no-one in this country should be put to death or be imprisoned for their beliefs."

Milada Horáková was sentenced to death on 8 June 1950, along with three co-defendants (Jan Buchal, Oldřich Pecl, and Záviš Kalandra). Many prominent figures in the West, notably scientist Albert Einstein, former British Prime Minister Winston Churchill, French President Vincent Auriol and former US First Lady Eleanor Roosevelt, petitioned for her life, but the sentences were confirmed. Horáková was hanged in Prague's Pankrác Prison on 27 June 1950 at the age of 48. Her reported last words were (in translation): "I have lost this fight but I leave with honour. I love this country, I love this nation, strive for their wellbeing. I depart without rancour towards you. I wish you, I wish you...".

Following the execution, Horáková's body was cremated at Strašnice Crematorium, but her ashes were not returned to her family. Their whereabouts are unknown.

=== Other defendants ===
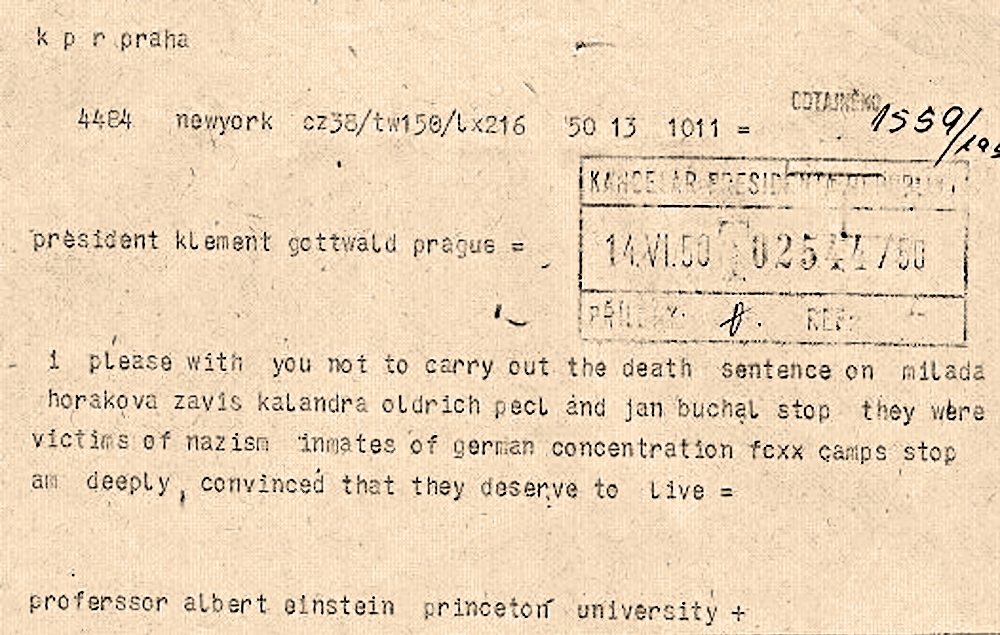
Telegram from Albert Einstein appealing for clemency for the accused

- Jan Buchal (1913–1950), State Security officer (executed)
- Vojtěch Dundr (1879–1957), former Secretary of the Czech Social Democratic Party (15 years)
- Jiří Hejda (1895–1985), former factory owner (life imprisonment)
- Bedřich Hostička (1914–1996), Secretary of the Czechoslovak People's Party (28 years)
- Záviš Kalandra (1902–1950), Marxist journalist (executed)
- Antonie Kleinerová (1901–1996), former member of Parliament for the Czechoslovak National Social Party (life imprisonment)
- Jiří Křížek (1895–1970), lawyer (22 years)
- Josef Nestával (1900–1976), administrator (life imprisonment)
- Oldřich Pecl (1903–1950), former mine owner (executed)
- Zdeněk Peška (1900–1970), university professor (25 years)
- František Přeučil (1907–1996), publisher (life imprisonment)
- Františka Zeminová (1882–1962), editor and former member of Parliament for the Czechoslovak National Social Party (20 years)

== Rehabilitations and honours ==
The trial verdict was annulled in June 1968 during the Prague Spring. The Soviet occupation of Czechoslovakia that followed, and suppression of resistance, disrupted the process of her political rehabilitation. Her rehabilitation was not completed until after the Velvet Revolution of 1989.

In 1990 a major thoroughfare in Prague 7, Letná, was renamed in her honour. In 1991 she was posthumously awarded the Order of Tomáš Garrigue Masaryk (1st Class). In the Czech Republic, "Commemoration Day for the Victims of the Communist Regime" was declared for 27 June, the day of her execution.

On 11 September 2008, aged 86, Ludmila Brožová-Polednová, the sole surviving member of the prosecution in the Horáková trial, was sentenced to six years in prison for assisting in the judicial murder of Milada Horáková. Brožová-Polednová was released from detention in December 2010, due to her age and health, and died on 15 January 2015.

In January 2020, Horáková was posthumously awarded the Order of the White Double Cross (1st Class) by Slovak president Zuzana Čaputová. The award was accepted by Erika Mačáková, member of Milada Horáková's Club.

== Family ==
Milada Horáková's husband, Bohuslav Horák, avoided arrest in 1949, escaping to West Germany and later settling in the United States. Their daughter, Jana, aged 16 at the time of her mother's execution, and subsequently raised by her aunt, was not able to join her father in the United States until 1968, where she proceeded to have a family with three grandchildren.

Horáková's last letters, including those to her husband and her daughter, have been published in English translation.

== Biographical film ==
Milada, a Czech-American feature film about the life of Milada Horáková, was released in November 2017. The role of Horáková is played by Ayelet Zurer. The English-language production is directed by the Czech-born film-maker, David Mrnka, who also was one of the writers of the screenplay.

== See also ==
- Heliodor Píka
- László Rajk
- Rudolf Margolius
- Rudolf Slánský
- Slánský trial
- Traicho Kostov
