= Czechoslovak Women's Union =

Czechoslovak Women's Union (CWU) or (Czech: Československý svaz žen (ČSŽ) was a state women's organization in Communist Czechoslovakia, founded in 1950.

It was a state organization and a branch of the Communist Party, Communist Party of Czechoslovakia.

After the Communist take over, the existing women's organizations, until then under the umbrella organization Women's National Council, was dissolved and incorporated in to the state women's union.

Its purpose was to mobilise women in the political ideology of the state, as well as to enforce the party's policy within gender roles and women's rights. It played an important role in the life of women in the state during its existence.
