= Valasca =

Legendary ruler of Bohemia

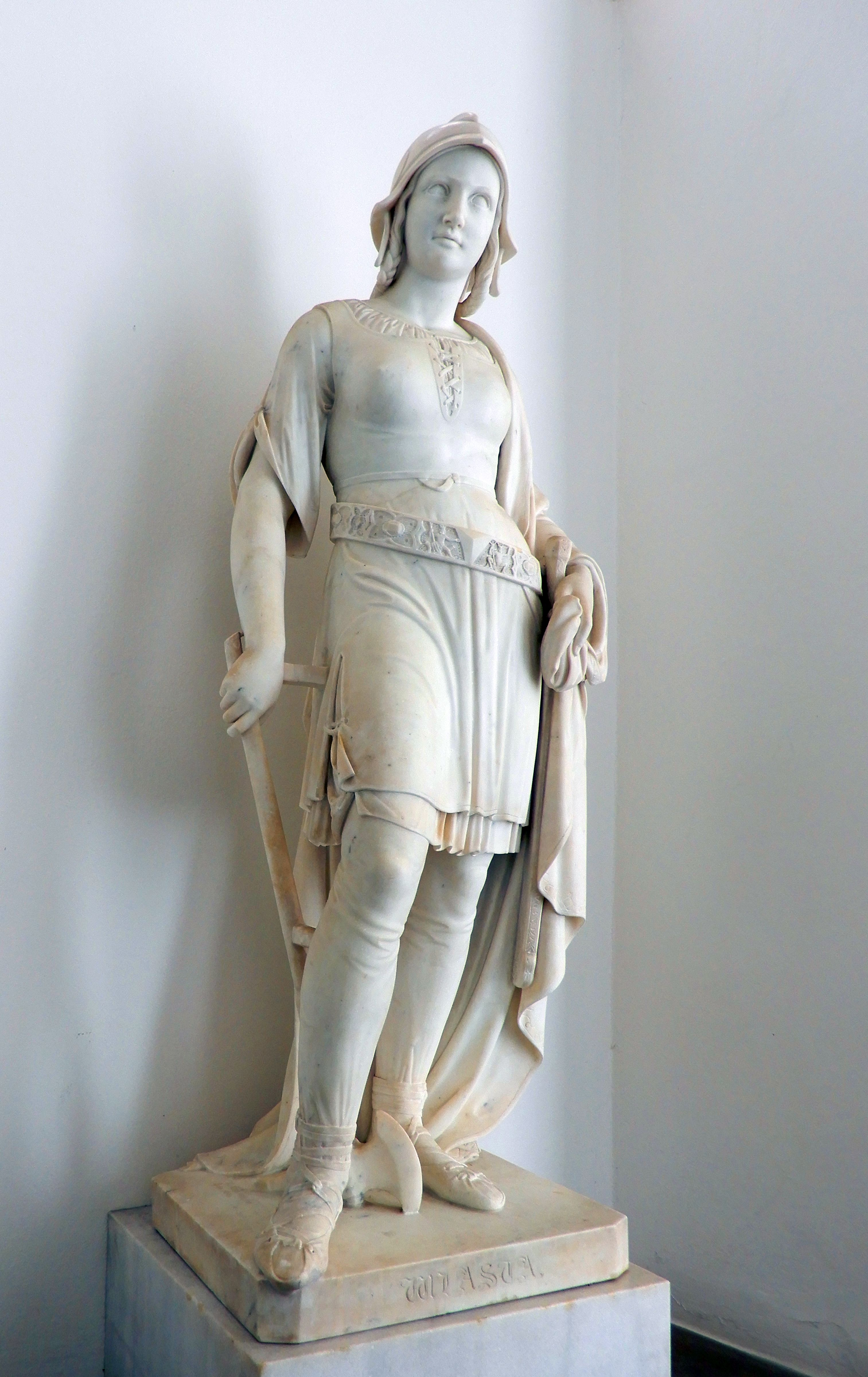
Josef Max: Vlasta, Rome 1842

Valasca is a woman mentioned in the History of Bohemia by Aeneas Silvius (Pope Pius II). She was also called Vlasta and was supporter of the mythical Bohemian Princess Libuše.

== Life ==
Valasca led a female rebellion against the rule of Přemysl after the death of Libuše. On the death of Libuše ca. 738, Valasca, one of Libussa(Libuše)'s favourite henchwomen, seized power and created a state ruled by women.

She decreed that only women were to receive military training and that boys were to be maimed to render them unable to fight by removal of the right eye and thumb. She supposedly distributed a potion to the women of Bohemia which protected them from men. She was slain by Primislaus(Přemysl) in battle after seven years of rule, at which point men regained power.

Her headquarters were traditionally believed to have been located in Dívčí Hrad ("The Virgin’s Castle") on Mount Vidovole.

== In popular culture ==
A character called Velasca played by Melinda Clarke in popular TV series Xena: Warrior Princess was loosely based on Valasca.
