= Ancient Bohemian Legends =

1894 book by Alois Jirásek

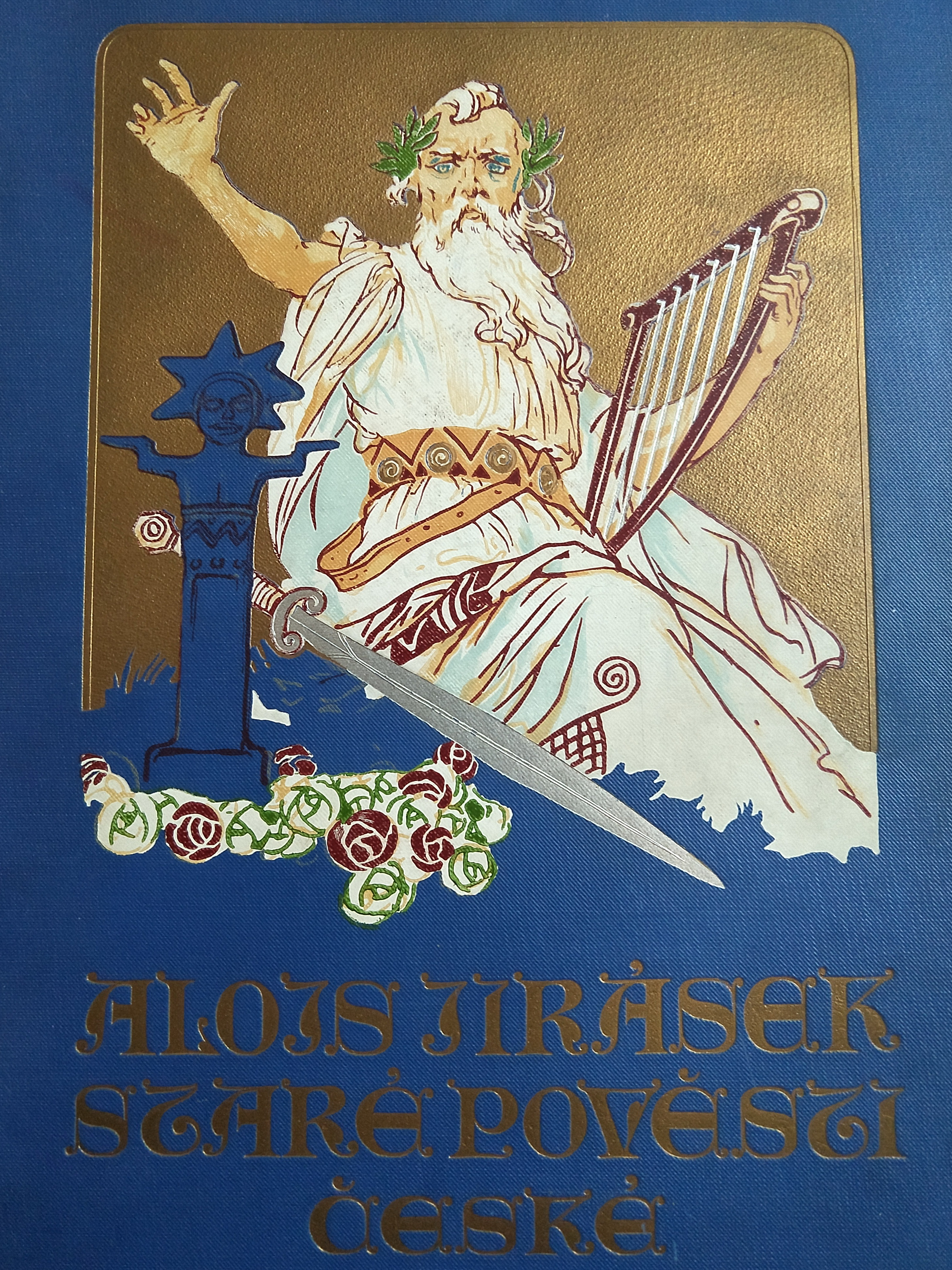
Ancient Bohemian legends (edition from 1932)

Ancient Bohemian legends (Czech: Staré pověsti české) is a book by Alois Jirásek written in 1894. It describes events from Czech history based on folk literature and some historical facts. The model was based on Chronicle of Hájek, Cosmas Chronicle of Bohemia and Chronicle of Dalimil, other old Czech chronicles and many other sources were also used. It includes legends such as Maidens' War, Libuše and Přemysl, Krok's Daughters, Bohemian Arrival and Golem of Prague. The book has three parts: Ancient Bohemian Legends, Legends of the Christian era and From ancient prophecies.

== Ancient Bohemian Legends ==
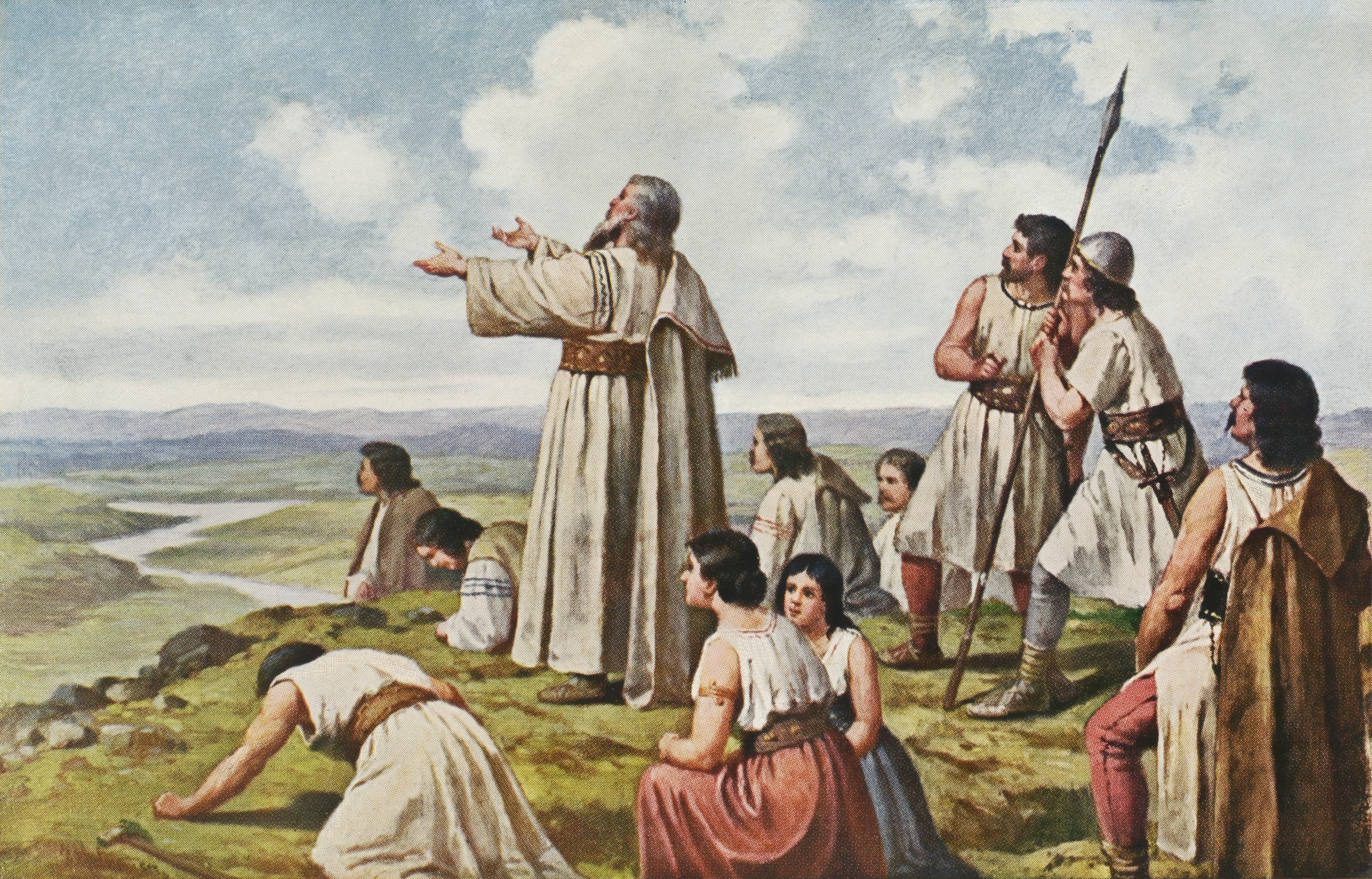
Čech on Říp Mountain

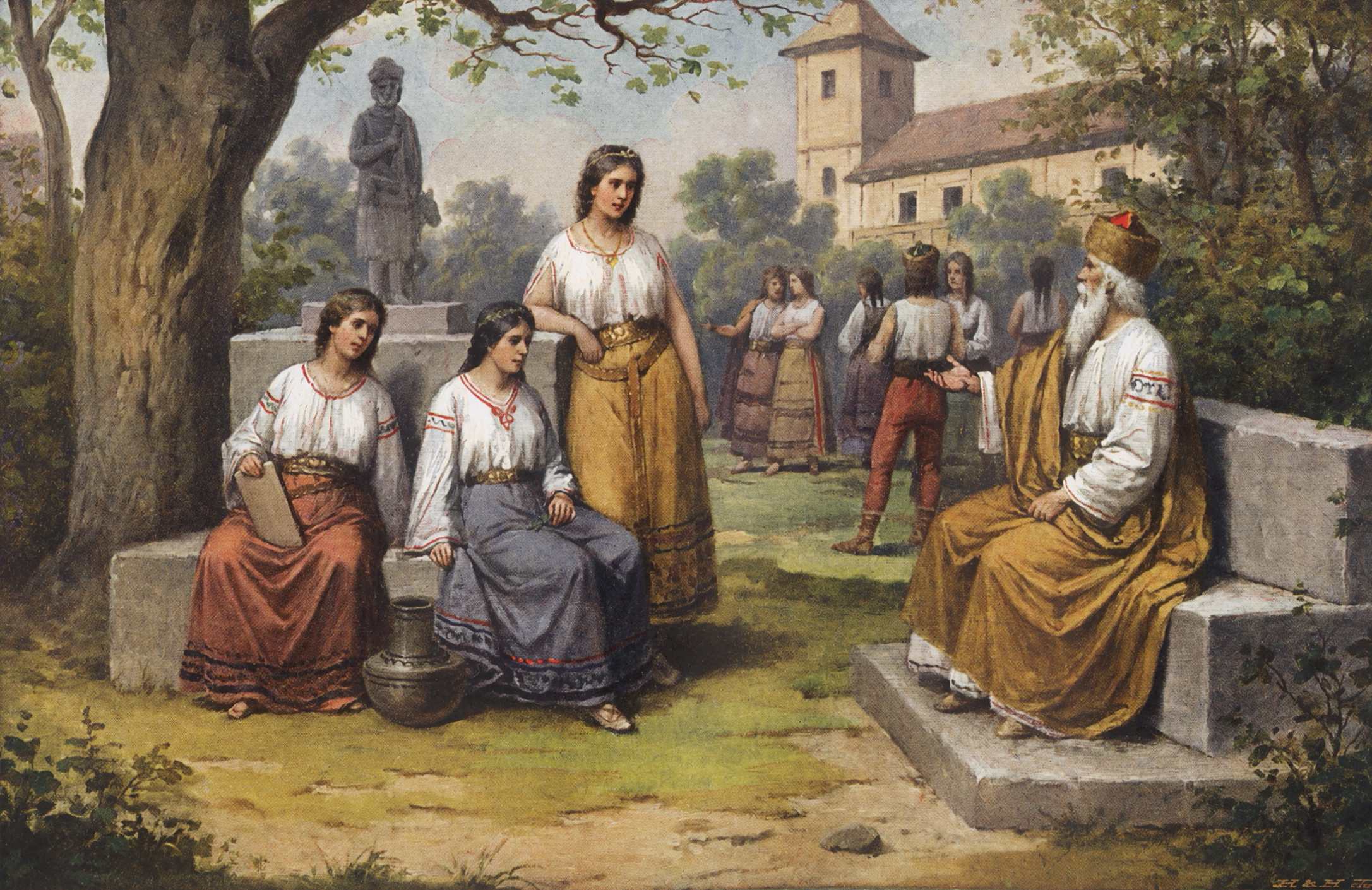
Duke Krok with his daughters: Libuše, Kazi, and Teta

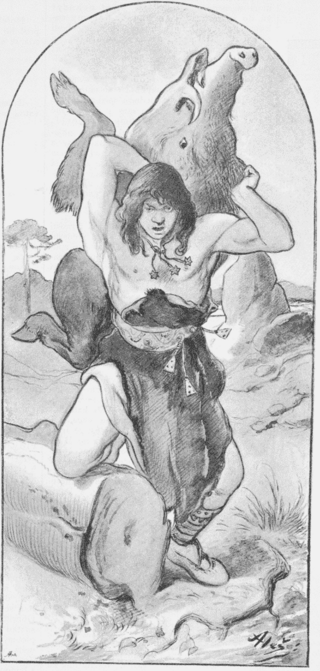
Bivoj

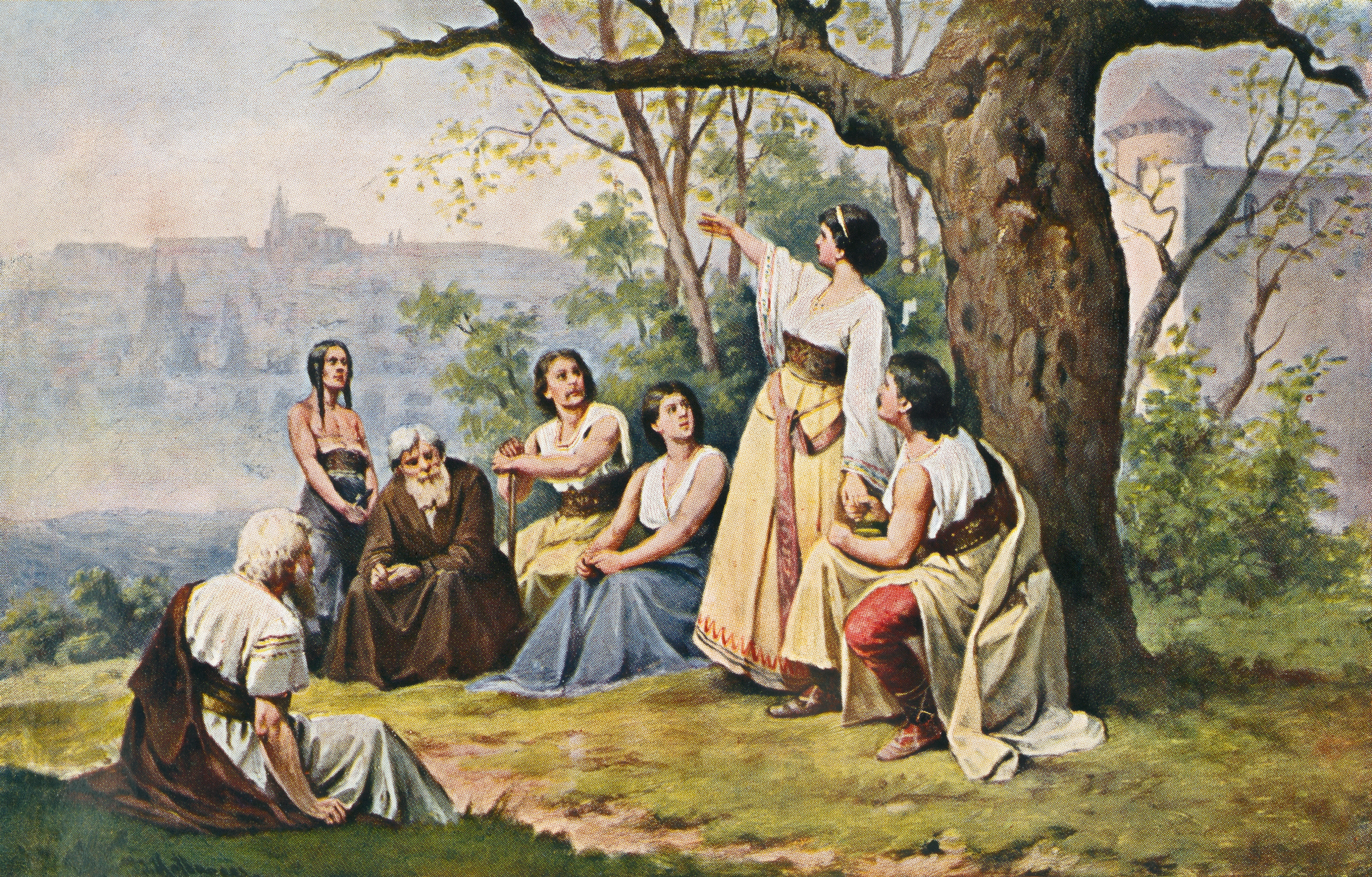
Princess Libuše prophesies the glory of Prague

=== Forefather Čech ===
According to myth, some Slavic people from an area between the Vistula River and Carpathian Mountains set off to the west in search of plentiful lands. They were led by Forefather Čech and his brother, Lech. After a long time (perhaps years) of traveling, they arrived to busky land.

Forefather Čech climbed Říp Mountain and looked around the land. Then he allegedly said: "Oh, comrades, you've endured hardships along with me, when we wandered in impassable woods; finally we arrived at our homeland. This is the best country, predestined for you. Here you won't miss anything, but you'll take pleasure in permanent safety. Now that this sweet and beautiful land is in your hands, think up a suitable name."

The Bohemians named their homeland after their leader and forefather: Čechy.

Touched, Čech replied: "Bless our Promised land, by thousandfold wishes wish-ful from us, save us scatheless and breed our issue from generation to generation.".

Then some Slavs around Lech rose up and left Bohemia; they settled in Poland.

Čech was duke (vojvoda) of his land for a long time. There was peace in his land, nobody thieved, and all was well. But after Čech's death, morals soon declined.

=== Krok and his Daughters ===
Krok was the ruler of a Bohemian tribe, that today would have been located in the Kladno district. He was just and kept his tribe at peace. When the Bohemians recognized his wisdom and fairness, they elected him as their new judge.

Krok and his wife, Niva (literally Lea, Mead) had three daughters: the eldest daughter, Kazi, knew every herbaceous plant and was a healer and a magician; their second daughter, Teta, taught Bohemians how to worship their deities, idols, and nymphs; the youngest daughter, Libuše, was a prophetess. Libuše was so chaste and kindly that the Bohemians elected her as judge after Krok's death.

=== Bivoj ===
Bivoj is a Czech legendary hero, who was supposed to catch a wild boar by his ears at Kavčí Mountain, and take him on his back to Libušín Castle. He was to marry Kazi for this act.

=== Libuše and Přemysl ===
Libuše was a wise and just judge for several years. In her free time, she used to ride her white horse to a nearby village, where a young man called Přemysl lived. Then one day two men came to Libušin (Libuše's seat) with a dispute - they were in disagreement as to where one's lot ended and the other's began.

Libuše judged them, but the loser was angry and exclaimed: "Why must we have a female judge? Every nation is ruled by a man - what a shame! Long hair means short reason!"

She listened to their protests and sent men to find her a suitable husband, saying, "Find yourself a duke and myself a husband, if you will. But beware, a man will be a stern ruler, harsh upon you, unlike I was. If you are unsure about what man to choose, take my white horse and go wherever it goes, until it stops in front of a man. You will know that it is the right man by these signs: he ploughs with two oxen, and he eats from an iron table. If you like, take horses, a robe, a cloak and shawls and go give that man a message from me and my people and bring a duke to yourselves and a husband to me."

They did as told; the white horse went for three days, looking neither right nor left, not stopping for a graze, not letting itself be disturbed by other horses playing in the pastures by the path. Finally, it stopped in front of Přemysl, who was just ploughing his field with two oxen. To welcome the delegation, Přemysl turned his plough upside down and served some bread with salt on top of the iron part of it. Then they brought him back to Libuše, who married him with great joy and made him the first Duke.

Later, during her life with Přemysl, it is said she had a long vision of the future capital Prague. "...I see a great city, the glory of which touches the stars."

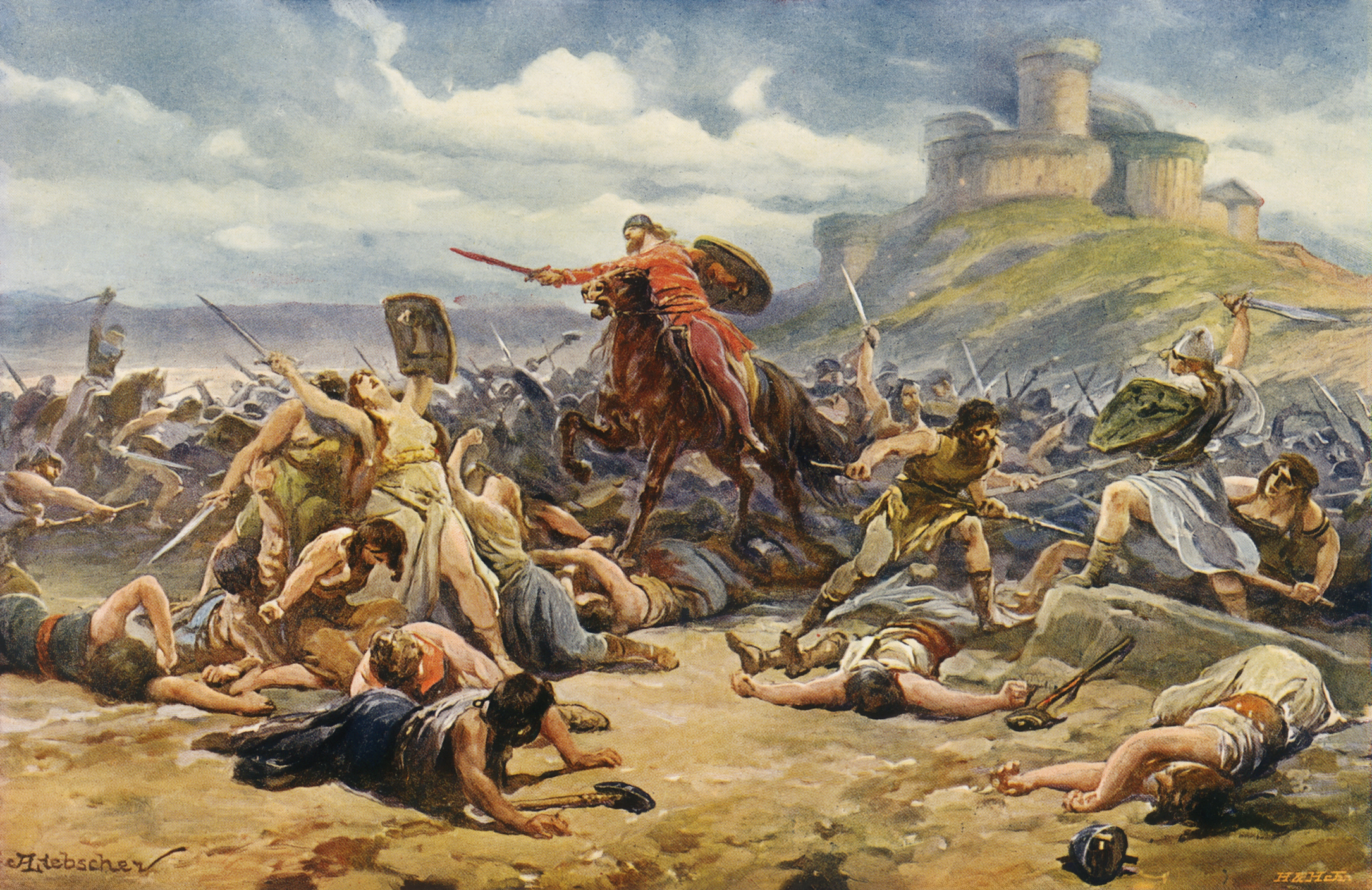
The Maidens' War, painted by Adolf Liebscher

=== The Maidens' War ===
As long as Libuše lived, women in Bohemia had many rights. But once Přemysl came into power, he started promoting male rights at the expense of female rights. This led Vlasta (Libuše's chambermaid) to rebel against Přemysl in the Maidens' War.

Most of Bohemia's women started conspiring, and they murdered men and waged war against them. The best-known tale is about Šárka, the noble maid, who baited a trap for Ctirad. She pretended to refuse to join Vlasta, tying her to a tree and leaving her in the centre of a deep forest. Ctirad then untied her and drank Šárka's poisoned mead. He fainted and Šárka captured him. After he woke up in the maidens' base, they tortured him to death. This provoked Přemysl to storm their castle and put an end to the horrific war.

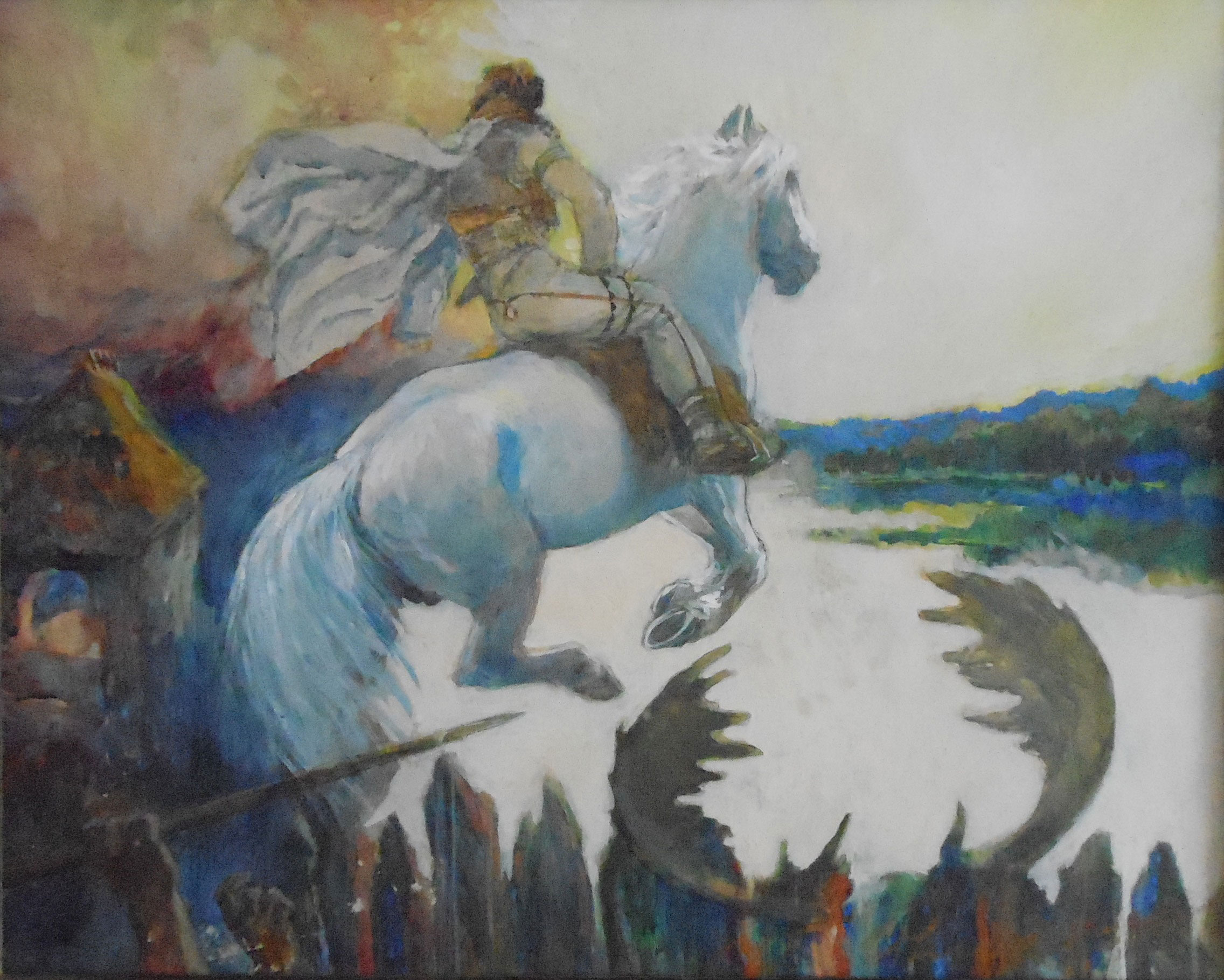
Horymír on horse Šemík jumps from a rock on Vyšehrad

=== Křesomysl and Horymír ===
With Přemysl as the first of the seven mythical dukes. Nezamysl the second (Nezamysl meaning "unpremeditated") was a son of Přemysl. His son was Mnata, the third, ("one who doesn't forget"). Mnata's son was Vojen, the fourth, (literally "soldierlike"). Vojen's son was Vnislav, the fifth, (literally "intrinsical"). Vnislav's son was the sixth, Křesomysl - most wealthy and powerful of the seven, having discovered silver mines in the borderland. Křesomysl's son was Neklan, the seventh and last. Neklan was of a weaker nature.

According to a legend, Horymír was a leader of Neumětely who was sentenced to death by Duke Křesomysl for the destruction of equipment for gold and silver mining in Bohemia. He was saved from death by his loyal horse Šemík, by a heroic jump from a rock on Vyšehrad, where the Duke's residence was located. However, the horse Šemík did not survive the jump and is buried in Neumětely, where its alleged tomb still stands.

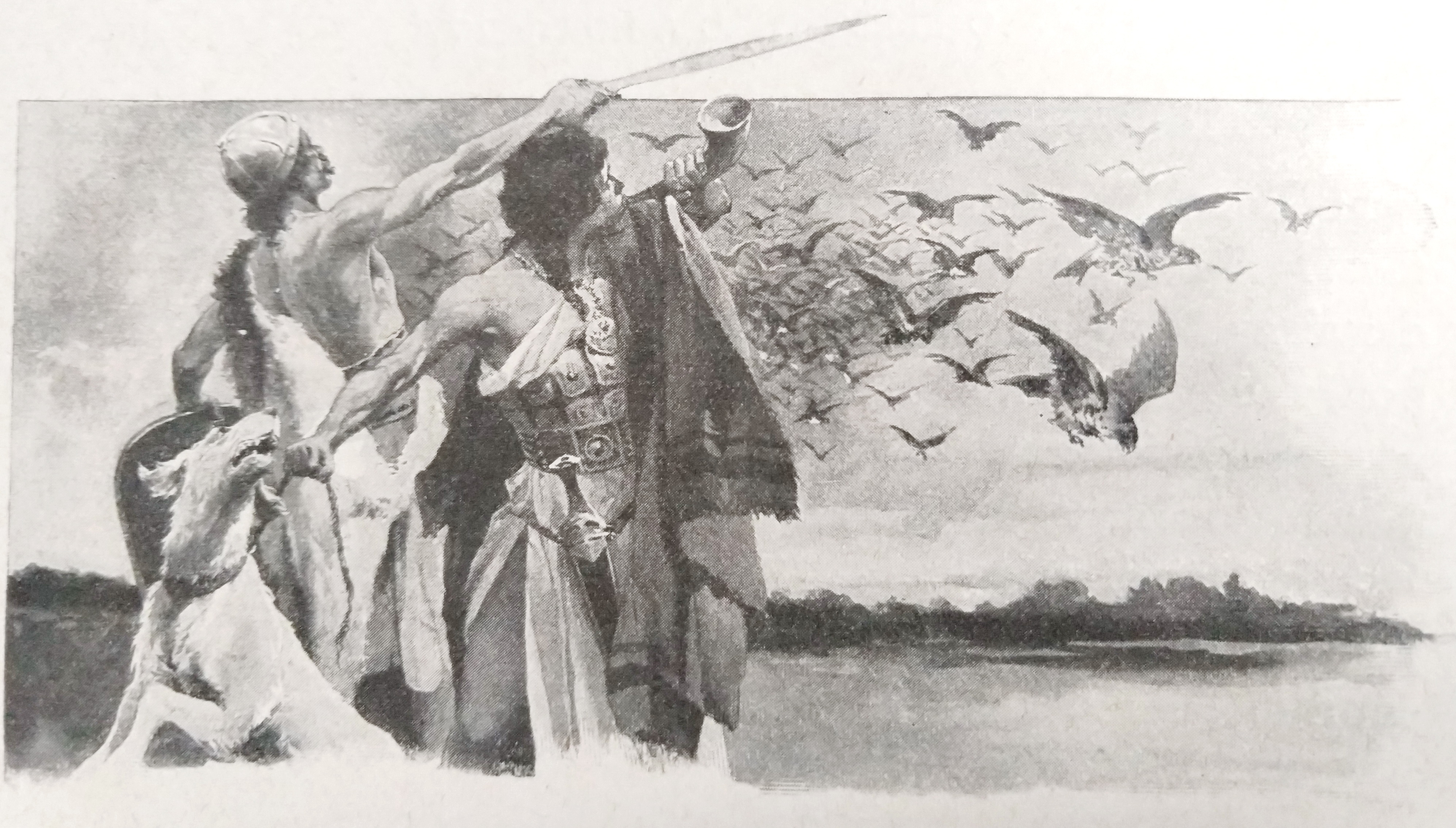
Lucko War

=== Lučan War ===
The Lučan War was a legendary war, that took place between the Czechs and Lučans in the 9th century. The Lučans were one of the mythical Czech tribes, who had been living in the area called Lucko, with the centre in Žatec. The cause of the war was the greed of the Lučans. Czechs led into the war Duke Neklan and Lučans led Squire (sometimes Duke) Vlastislav. For the decisive battle a cowardly Duke Neklan sent for himself the hero Tyr, dressed in Neklan's princely cloak and balaclava, and seated on Neklan's horse. The decisive battle took place near Tursko. Lučans led many dogs, wolves, sheepdogs and wolfhounds, others carried birds of prey, falcons, gyrfalcons and buzzards on their shoulders.

The two armies clashed on 9 May 869, and the fight lasted all day. Bird wings darkened the sky. In the battle Tyr killed Vlastislav. Before his death, Vlastislav's soul flew out of his mouth and flew into the surrounding tree branches. Tyr then lost his horse and was killed himself. Encouraged by Tyr's victory, the Czechs won the battle. They built a monument to Tyr on top of the artificial mound Krliš and buried him there. About twenty thousand men clashed in the battle, which was a tenth of the population of the then Bohemia.

=== Durynk and Neklan ===
After the Lučan War, Duke Neklan had mercy on the orphan Zbyslav of the defeated leader Vlastislav. Neklan let him be raised by a man called Durynk, who used to serve Vlastislav, but Neklan trusted him. The first winter after the death of Vlastislav, Durynk cut a hole in the ice of a frozen river and on the pretext of seeing a fish forced Zbyslav to lie on the ice. Then he killed him and took his severed head to Neklan, thinking he would get a reward by ridding him of his last enemy. Instead, Neklan was frightened and shouted: "Choose death yourself! That's my reward!". Durynk hanged himself on an alder, which was then called the "Durynk Alder".

== Legends of the Christian era ==
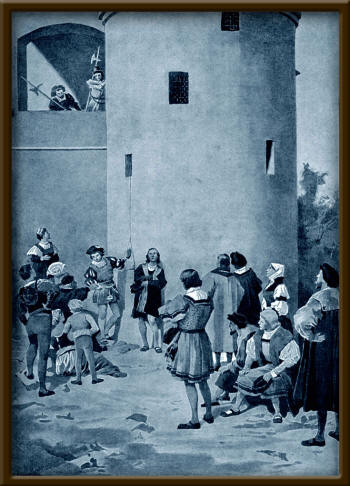
Dalibor in the tower

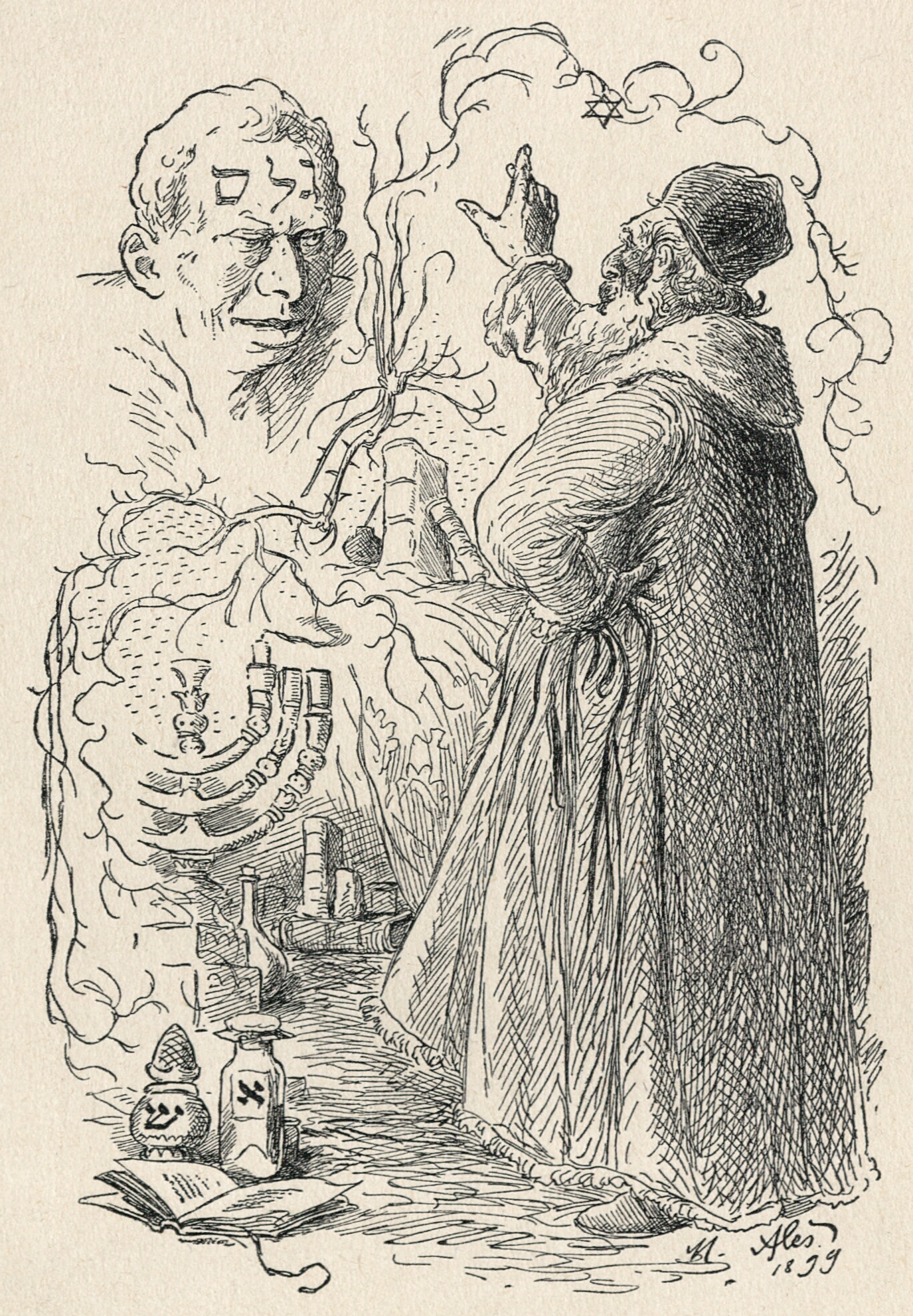
Golem and Rabbi Loew

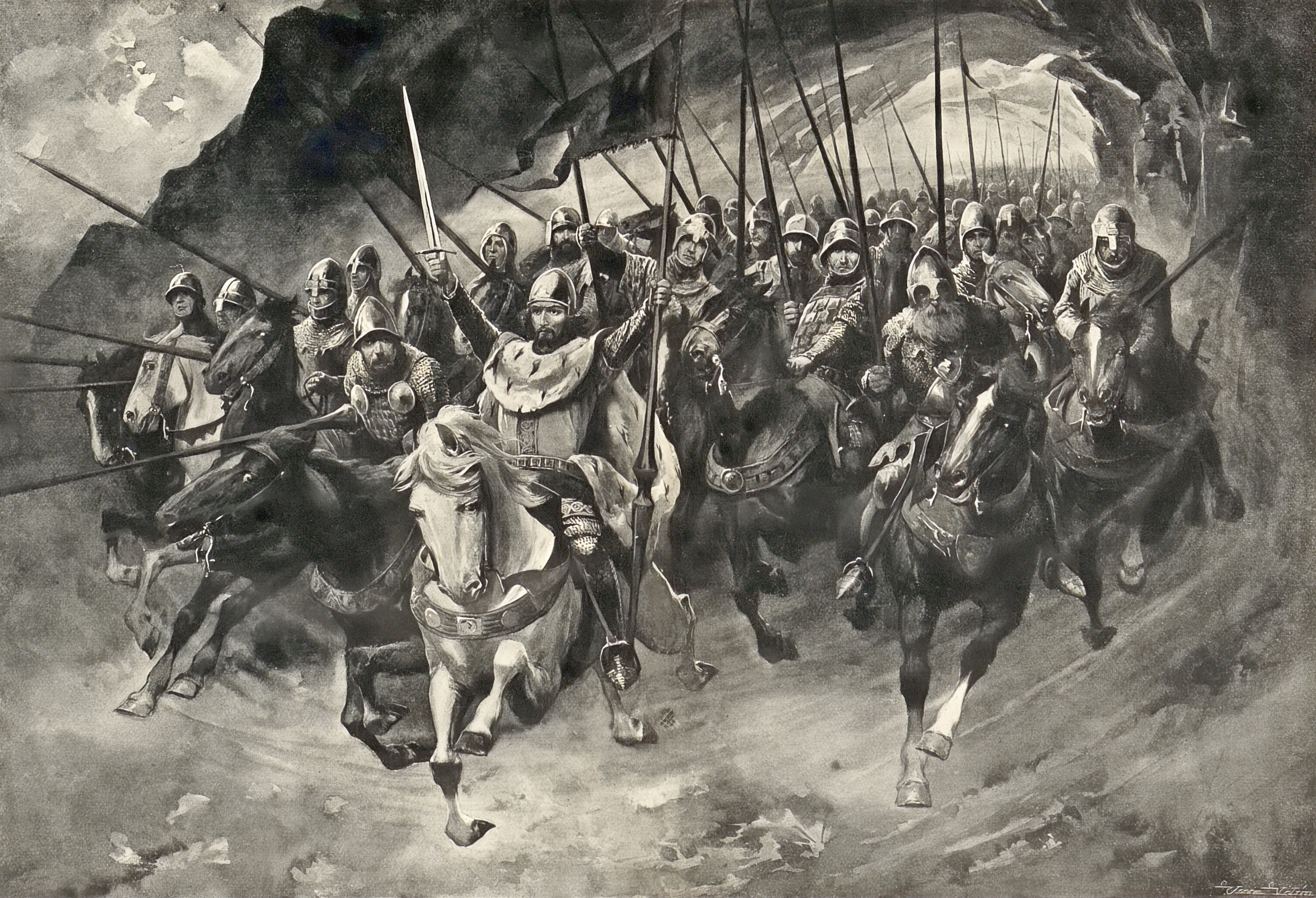
Knights set off from the Blaník mountain

- King Svatopluk
- King Ječmínek
- Flag of St. Wenceslaus
- Bruncvík
- Opatovice treasure
- Old Prague
  - Old Prague
  - Žito the Magician
  - King Wenceslaus IV
  - Old Town Orloj
  - About Dalibor
  - From the Jewish town
  - Sad places
  - Golem
  - Faust House
- Jan Žižka
- Kutná Hora miners
- White Lady
- Pink glade
- God's judgment
- Juraj Jánošík

== From ancient prophecies ==
- Sibylline Oracles
- Prophecy of a Blind Lad
- Prophecy of Havlas Pavlata
- Various prophecies
- Blaník knights

== Adaptations ==
- Puppet animation film Old Czech Legends based on the stories, directed by Czech animator Jiří Trnka, was released in 1953. In 1961, the book with Trnka's illustrations was published.
- In 2009, a Czech-American historical-fantastic feature film, The Pagan Queen about Princess Libuše, was made.

== Translations ==
- The book has been translated into Russian (1899, Старинныя сказания чешскаго народа; 1987, Старинные чешские сказания), Slovak (1951, Staré povesti české), Romanian (1955, Vechi povestiri cehe), English (1963, Legends of Old Bohemia; 1992, Old Czech Legends), Mongolian (1965, Эртний Чех домог тууж), German (1975, Böhmens alte Sagen), Bulgarian (1978, Старинни чешки предания), Hungarian (1984, Régi cseh mondák), Polish (1989, Stare podania czeskie), Italian (1989, Racconti e leggende della Praga d'oro) and Japanese language (2011, チェコの伝説と歴史).
