= Šárka =

Šárka (pronounced [ˈʃaːrka]) may refer to one of the following:

- Šárka (name), Czech female given name (includes people bearing the name)
- Šárka, the mythical warrior-maiden of Bohemia, a character in The Maidens' War
- Ctirad and Šárka, sculpture by Josef Václav Myslbek
- Šárka (Fibich), an opera by Zdeněk Fibich
- Šárka (Janáček), the first opera by Leoš Janáček
- Šárka, the third symphonic poem of Bedřich Smetana's Má vlast
- Divoká Šárka, nature reserve in the Czech Republic
