= Lučans =

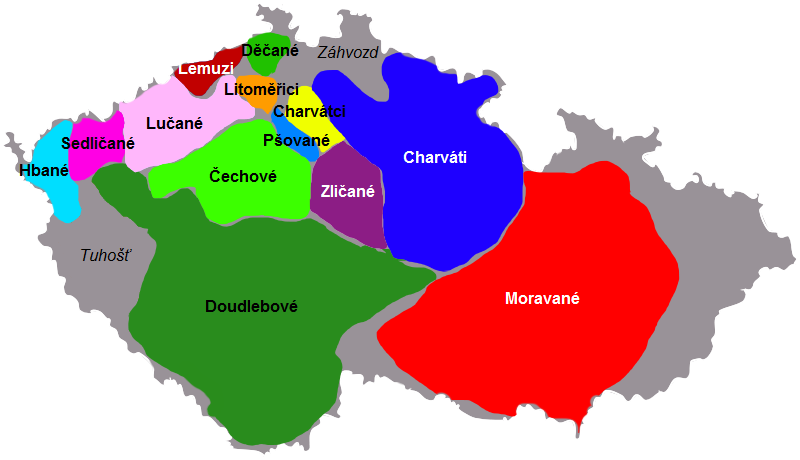
The Lučans on a map of historiographically abandoned hypothesis about the Czech tribes.

The Lučans (Czech: Lučané) were one of the legendary Czech tribes that lived before the establishment of the Duchy of Bohemia in the region called Lucko, with its center in Žatec. They are known mainly from the legend of the Lučan War. They may have existed in the 9th to the 10th century, and possibly survived until the 12th century.

== Sources ==
No written evidence survives from the time when this tribe is supposed to have existed independently. The first mention of Lucko and the Lučans appears in the first book of Cosmas’s Chronicle of the Czechs, from which most information derives.

The scholar Vladimír Karbusický suggested that Cosmas may have drawn on an older source when recording the legend, namely a now-lost Old Czech heroic song.

== Territory ==
According to the chronicle, the territory of Lucko lay along the river Ohře. To the east, near present-day Lovosice, it bordered on the land of the Litoměřici. The boundary with the Czechs proper likely ran more or less along the Ohře up to Žatec and then south towards the river Mže. The western frontier of Lucko is uncertain, though it can be assumed that the modern Sokolov region also fell under Lučan control.

Cosmas records that the nation of the Lučans (natio Luczano), who in his own time were by modern usage (a modernis) called after the castle of Žatec (Satc), the Žatčané (Satcenses), inhabited a territory (provincia) divided into five regions (regio), which he lists as follows: the first around the stream Guntna, the second along the river Uzka, the third around the brook Brocnica, the fourth called the Forest Region (Silvana), and the fifth the proper Lucko or Luka (Luca).

Besides Žatec, another important fortified settlement was Vlastislav near today’s Třebenice. Another Lučan stronghold, of which only the name of a local district survives, was Drahúš in today’s town of Postoloprty.

== History ==
According to legend, the Lučans were enemies of the Czechs and their rulers, the Přemyslids. Cosmas states that Lucko perished during the reign of Duke Neklan, whose army, in the Lučan War—specifically in the battle of Tursko—defeated the powerful Lučan host led by Vlastislav. Under the Přemyslid dynasty, however, the Lučans apparently continued to exist, as Cosmas refers to them as his contemporaries.

Cosmas’s account of the Lučan War may in fact describe a later historical event, probably the consolidation of power by Duke Boleslaus I after the murder of his brother Wenceslaus. In Widukind’s chronicle, under the year 936, there is mention of Saxon and Thuringian intervention in a conflict between Boleslaus and another “minor prince” (subregulus). Boleslaus is said to have defeated the Thuringian and later Saxon contingents, and on his return burned the castle (urbs) of that prince. This is consistent with archaeological finds, including dating at Vlastislav.

The existence of an independent tribe in northwestern Bohemia rivaling the Czechs (Přemyslids) is today doubted. The Lučans are, however, regarded as one of the early Czech principalities.

== Legacy ==
- The legend of the Lučan War was retold by Alois Jirásek in his collection Ancient Bohemian Legends.
- The Czech black metal band Maniac Butcher released in 1996 the album Lučan Antikrist.
- In the Louny District, a newspaper titled Deník Lučan was published, today appearing as the Žatec and Louny Daily under the Vltava-Labe-Press publishing house. In Žatec, a beer named Lučan was brewed, and the same name was also borne by a local cinema and the military sports club.
- The musician Oldřich Janota (1949–2024) composed the song *Bitva na Tursku* (“Battle of Tursko”), released on the album *Podzimní král* (2000, CD supplement to the magazine *Stereo & Video*, reissue of recordings from 1983–1984).
- Lučan is also a Czech surname.
- The Lučans should not be confused with the Italiac tribe called Lucanians.
