= Lučan War =

Legendary early Bohemian conflict

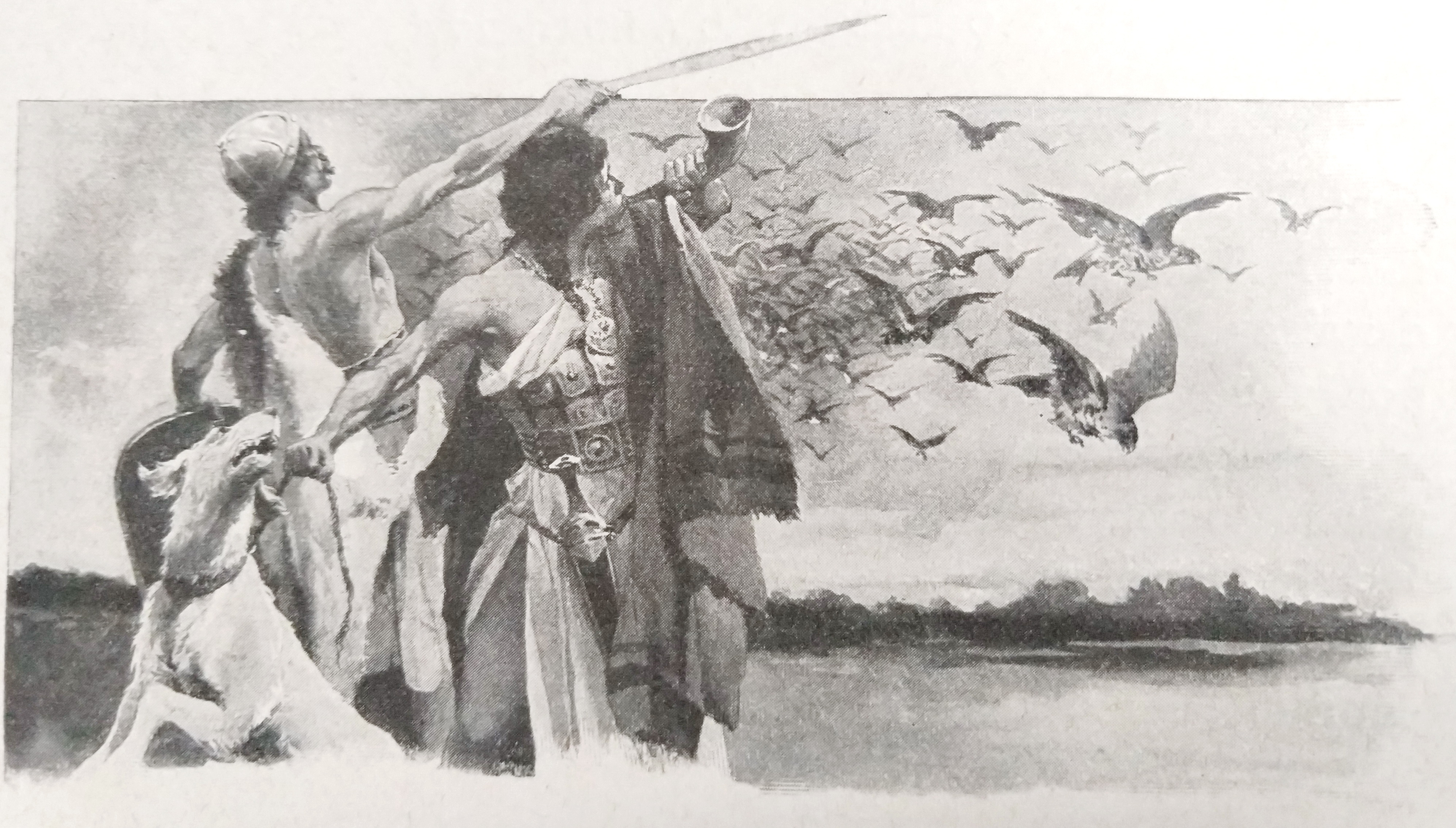
- The Lučan War (illustration from Old Czech Legends)
Date	Legendary, traditionally placed in the 9th century
Location	Near Tursko, Central Bohemia (traditional site)
Result	Czech victory; death of Duke Vlastislav

Belligerents
Early Czechs	Lučans

Commanders and leaders
Prince Neklan (nominal); Čestmír (commander, per later tradition) (Note: called Tyr/Styr in other versions)	Duke Vlastislav of Žatec

Strength
Unknown	Unknown

Casualties and losses
Čestmír killed	Heavy; Vlastislav killed

The Lučan War (Lucká válka) was a legendary conflict between the early Czechs and the Lučan tribe. The story is preserved in medieval chronicles and later retellings, and while it may reflect historical events, its details are generally regarded as mythological.

== Background ==
According to the legend, the war took place during the reign of Prince Neklan, the successor of Křesomysl. Neklan was described as a peaceful and cautious ruler who sought to maintain good relations with the Lučans, led by their duke Vlastislav of Žatec. Despite a peace agreement, Vlastislav launched raids against Czech villages, forcing Neklan's people into open conflict.

== The battle ==
Neklan himself did not lead his troops. Instead, he entrusted command to a warrior named Čestmír (called Tyr or Styr in other versions). Disguised in Neklan's princely garments and riding his horse, Čestmír rallied the Czech army and marched to meet the Lučans near Tursko.

The Lučans are said to have brought with them wolfhounds, shepherds with dogs, and men carrying falcons, hawks, and other birds of prey. The clash was fierce: Čestmír killed Vlastislav but was eventually unhorsed and slain. His sacrifice, however, inspired the Czechs to win the battle. In his memory, the Czechs raised a mound on Mount Krliš near Tursko.

== Aftermath ==
The victory destroyed a powerful rival and consolidated Czech power. According to legend, Vlastislav's young son Zbyslav was taken captive but spared by Neklan, who provided him with a residence in the land of the Lučans and placed him in the care of Durynk, a former servant of Vlastislav.

One winter, Durynk treacherously lured the boy onto a frozen river, cut a hole in the ice, and drowned him. He then severed the child's head and presented it to Neklan, expecting a reward. Horrified, Neklan rejected the act. Ashamed, Durynk hanged himself from a nearby alder tree, thereafter known as "Durynk's alder."

== Sources ==
The earliest account of the Lučan War appears in the Chronica Boemorum of Cosmas of Prague (early 12th century). The tale is retold in the Chronicle of Dalimil (14th century), where the Czech commander is called Styr. In the 19th century, it was included in the controversial Manuscript of Dvůr Králové, where the commander is given the name Čestmír, a version later adopted by Alois Jirásek in his Ancient Bohemian Legends (1894).

== Historicity ==
Scholars debate to what extent the Lučan War reflects real events. Cosmas may have drawn on oral traditions from northern Bohemia, possibly influenced by ruins at Vlastislav. Some historians connect the story to a genuine conflict in 936 between Duke Boleslaus I of Bohemia and a northern Bohemian ruler, perhaps supported by Thuringian forces, as described by Widukind of Corvey. Archaeological finds at Vlastislav support the presence of a fortified settlement at this time.

Recent research suggests the legend may indeed echo a historical battle, though on a smaller scale and possibly fought elsewhere—perhaps near Budeč, where mass graves showing evidence of violent deaths have been uncovered.

== In popular culture ==
The Lučan War was popularized in Jirásek's Ancient Bohemian Legends (1894) and has since appeared in Czech literature, theatre, and television adaptations.
