= Divoká Šárka =

Nature reserve in Prague, Czechia

Coordinates: 50°06′31″N 14°21′03″E

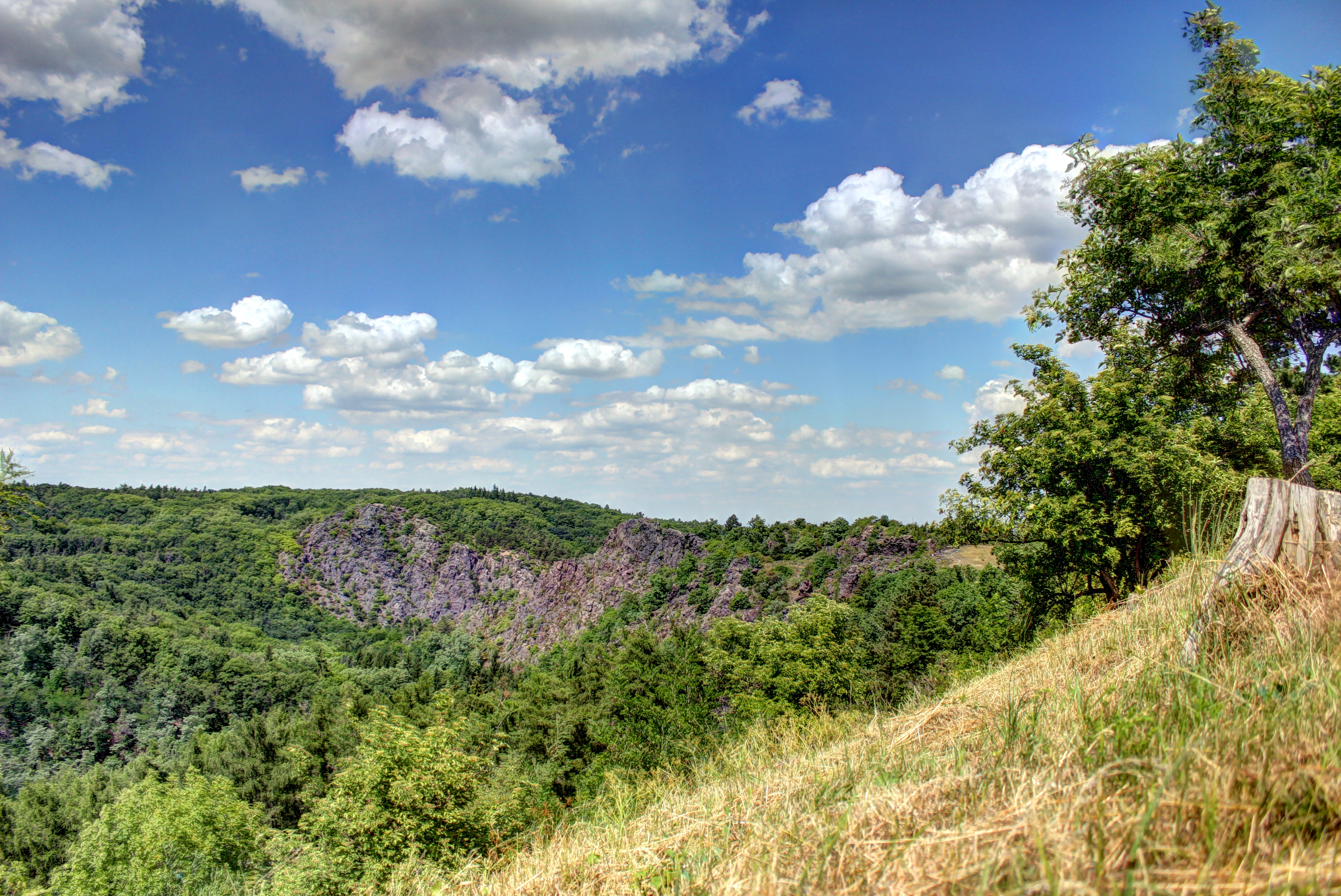
View of Divoká Šárka

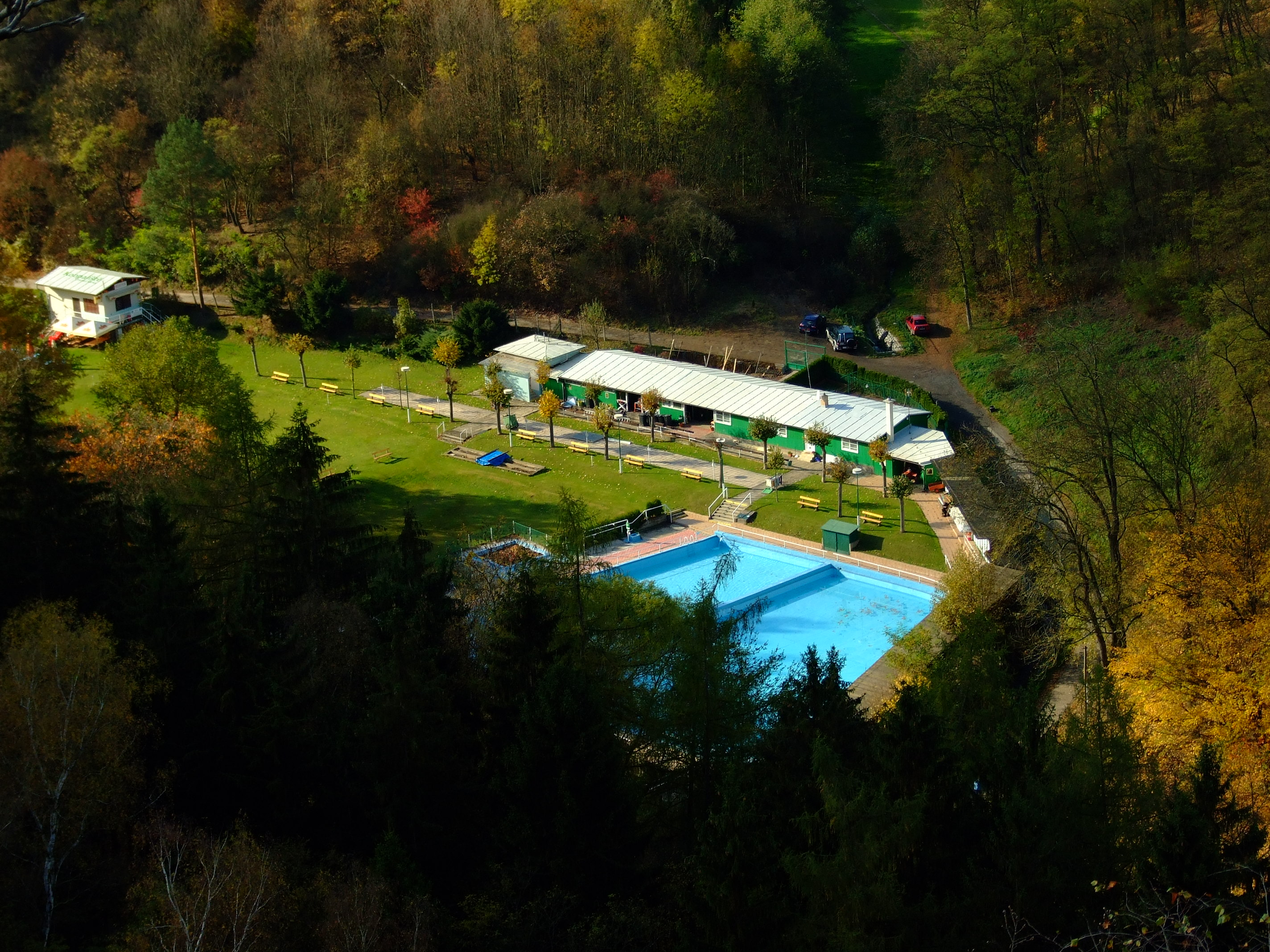
Public swimming pool in Divoká Šárka

Divoká Šárka (Czech pronunciation: [ˈɟɪvokaː ˈʃaːrka]; wild Šárka) is a nature reserve on the northwestern outskirts of Prague, the capital city of the Czech Republic.

Around the 6th century, the Slavs came to this area. Between the 7th and 9th centuries, there was a Slavic settlement above the Džbán gorge, consisting of an area of approximately twenty ha.

A gorge in the area is named after the female warrior Šárka, who, according to Ancient Bohemian Legends, threw herself to her death from its cliffs after betraying her lover Ctirad during the Maidens' War.

Divoká Šárka is the closest location to Prague where the black woodpecker lives.

The reserve has a lake along its edge as well as a public swimming pool within.

== Gallery ==
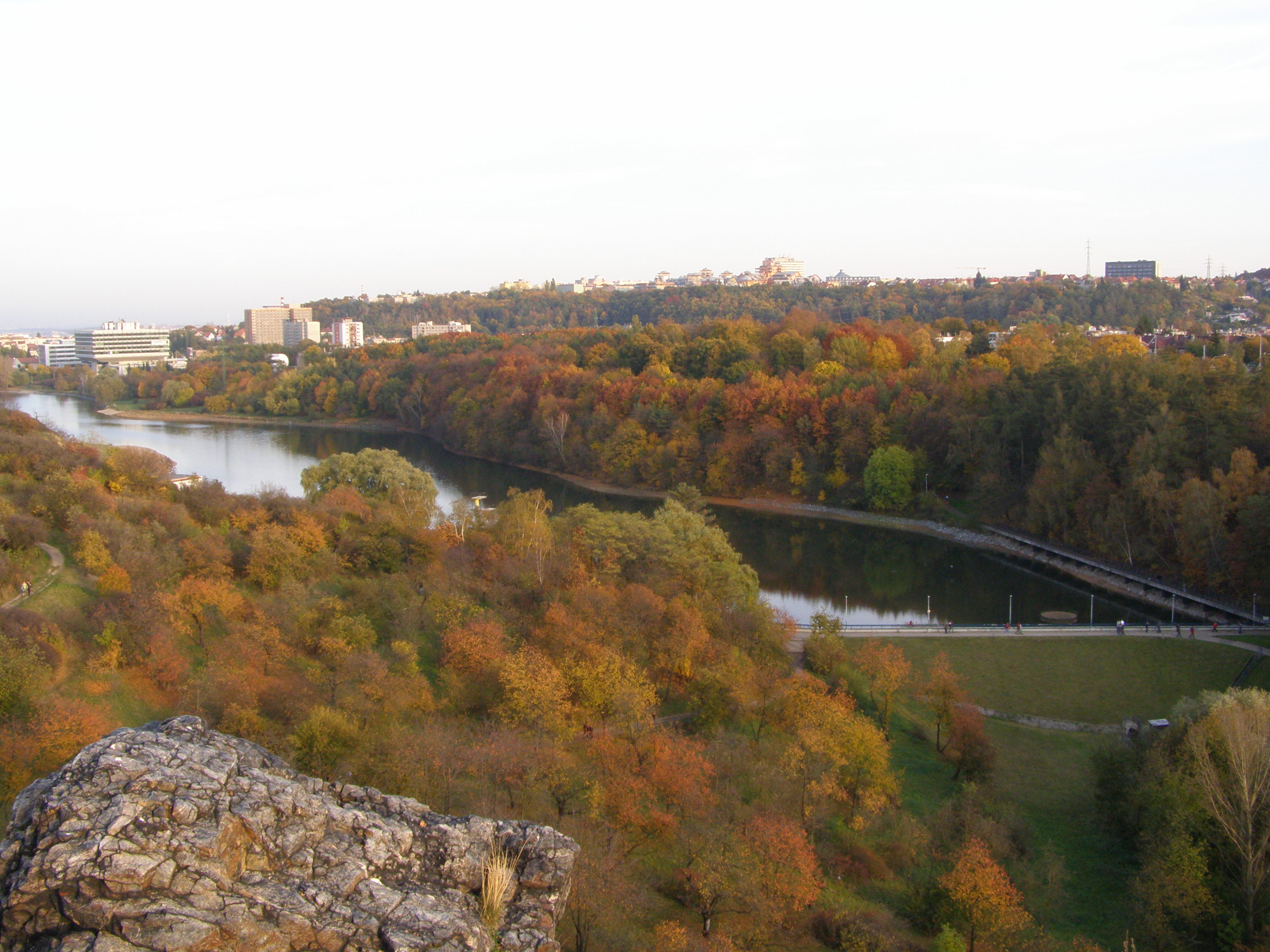
Džbán reservoir

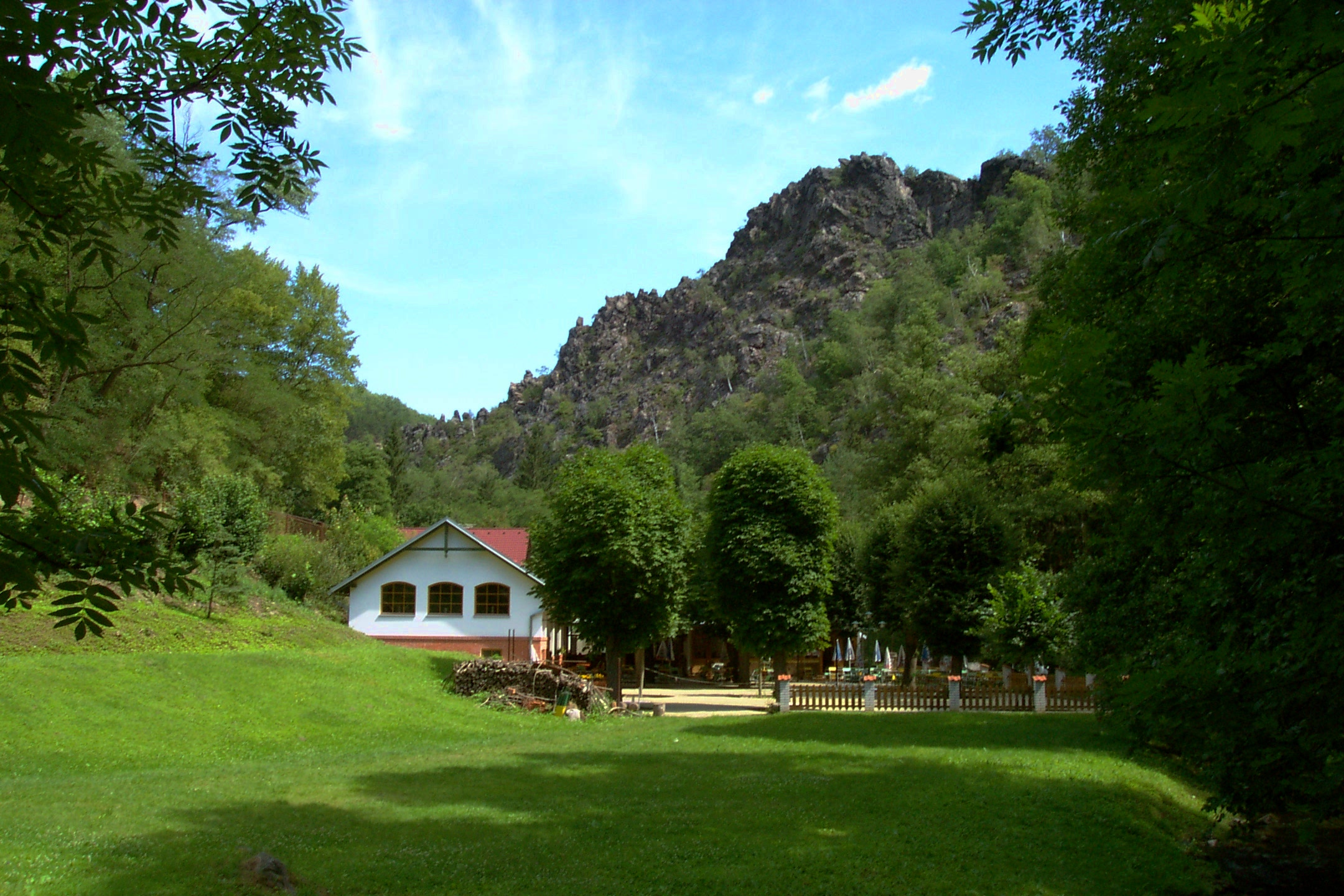
Restaurant Dívčí skok

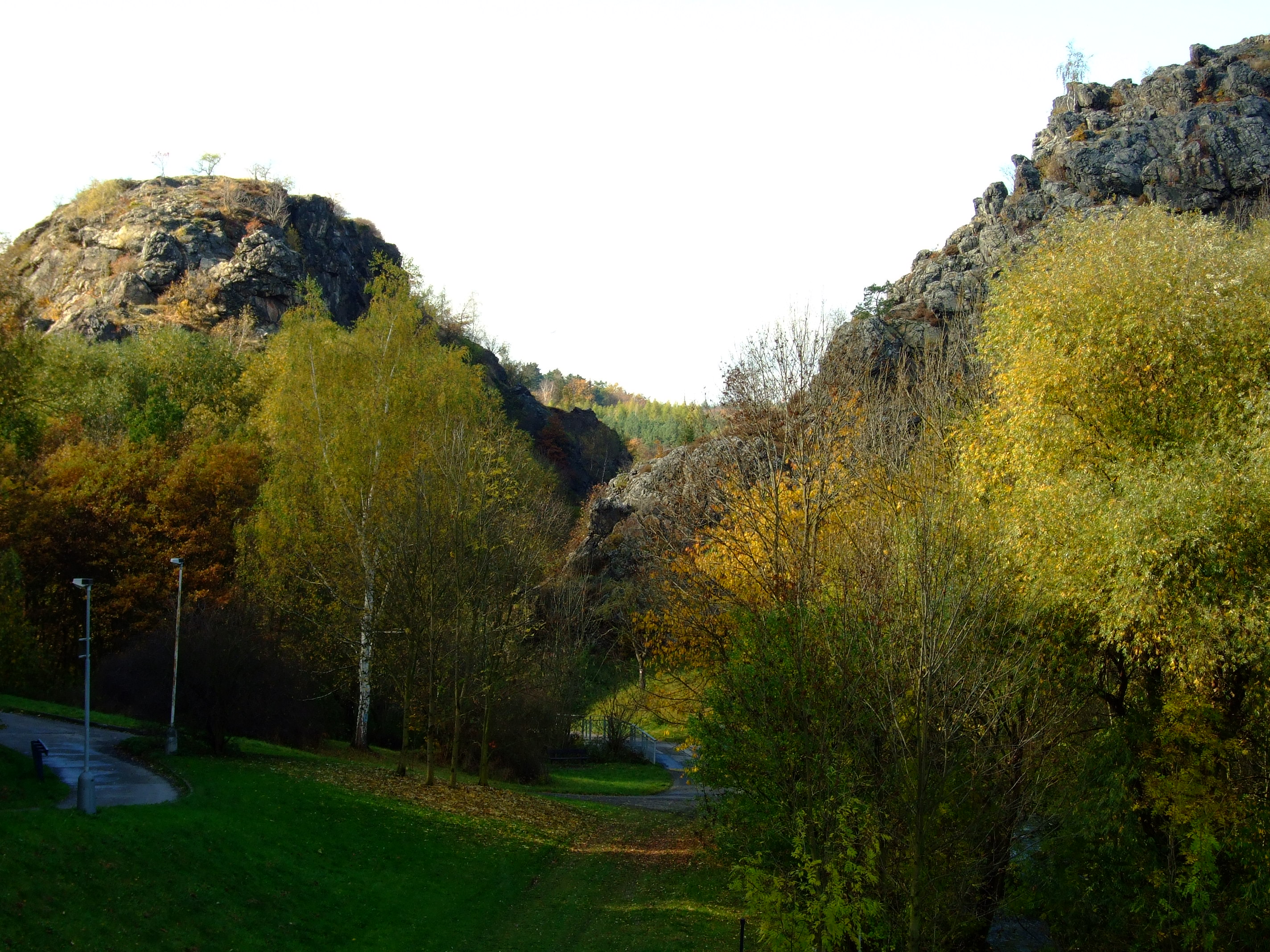
Džbán gorge

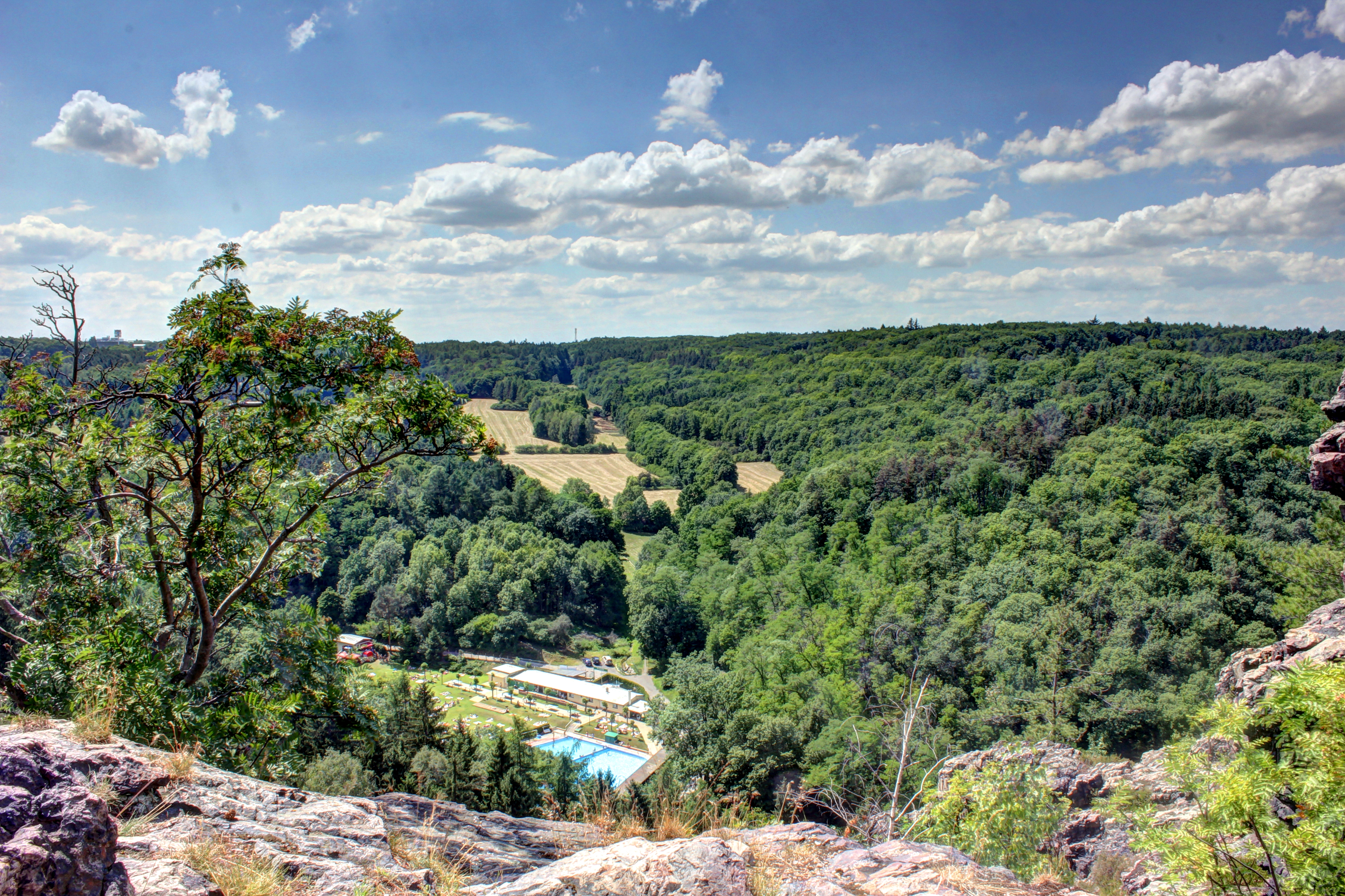

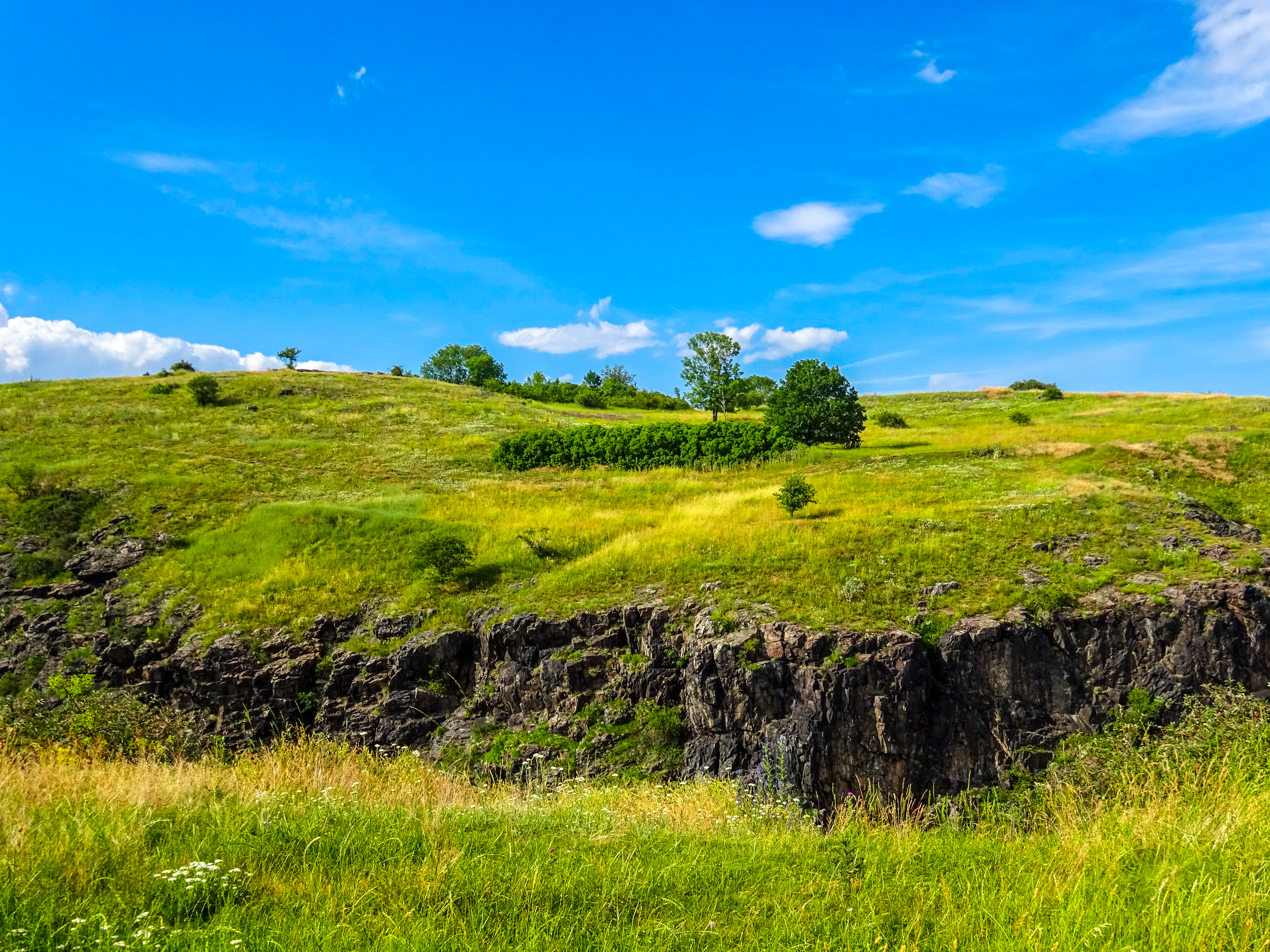
