= Žito =

Court magician

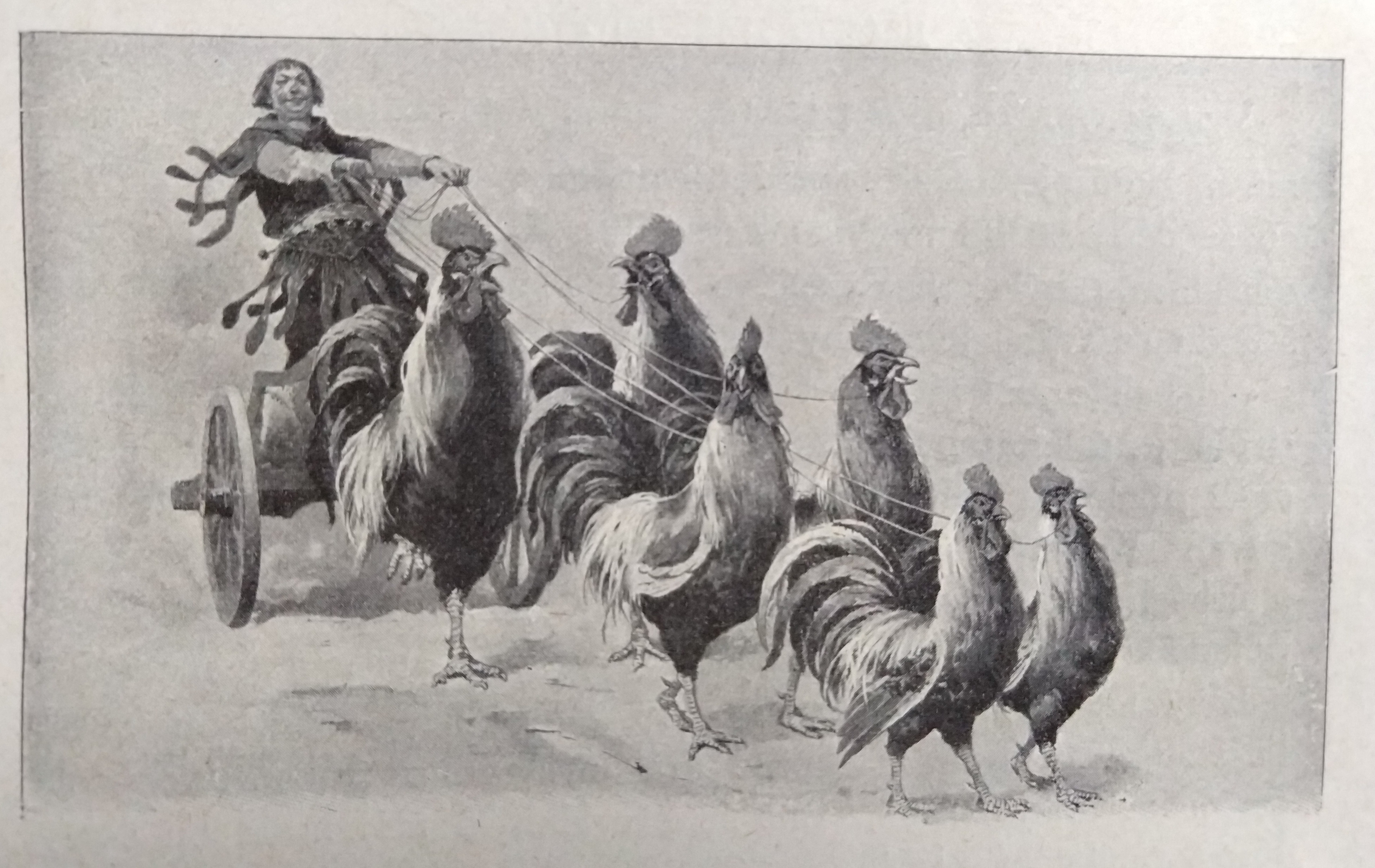
- Zito Kouzelnik Venceslav Cerny (1932)
- Born: Unknown; Unknown; Unknown
- Occupation(s): Court magician of Wenceslaus IV of Bohemia, illusionist, scam artist, livestock farmer/dealer
- Years active: ca. 14th Century
- Spouse: Unknown
- Partner: Unknown
- Children: Unknown

Žito (Czech pronunciation: [ˈʒɪto], also called Ziito, fl. fourteenth century) was a court-magician of Wenceslaus IV of Bohemia.

== History ==
Žito was well known as a conjurer and illusionist. Reportedly, he was deformed and had a mouth that stretched from ear to ear.

Among the tales told of his prowess with sleight of hand is one in which, during an argument with a visiting juggler, he swallowed him whole, except for his shoes. He returned a time later, leading his opponent by the hand. Supposedly this occurred during the wedding of Wenceslaus and Sophia.

At a banquet, he caused a commotion outside, and when the guests went to look, he affixed deer antlers to their heads, which prevented them from drawing their heads back inside. While they struggled to remove them, he helped himself to sweets from their tables.

In another, he sold a butcher a dozen pigs, under the condition they not drink from running water. When they did so, the pigs changed into kernels of corn. He was angry at Žito and accosted him roughly, tearing one of his arms out by the roots. The argument soon attracted a crowd and Žito called out that the butcher was actually selling human flesh in his stall. The crowd rushed to look and found the proof. When the butcher was about to be torn apart, Žito called out for the crowd to look again. They found only animal meat.

He traveled in a cart drawn by poultry.

According to Historia regni Boiemiae; published in 1552 by Dubravius, he was at the end taken to Hell, in "both body and soul".

== Factualness ==
P. T. Barnum, while considering all stories of magicians to be fictional, points out that the story of the butcher closely resembles a story about Doctor Faustus selling a magic trick horse, before allowing the enraged buyer to pull off his foot and leg while Faustus slept.

While many of his exploits can be seen as the product of skilled illusions such as Misdirection and Quick-change, in the past this was seen as the product of sorcery.

== Mentions ==
Appeared in House of Secrets' short feature Realm of the Mystics.

Appeared on a postage stamp of the Czech Republic in 1997.

In Holub's poem "Žito the Magician", Žito can do many wondrous things, but he can't make a $\sin(\alpha)$ greater than one.
