= Neumětely =

- Municipality
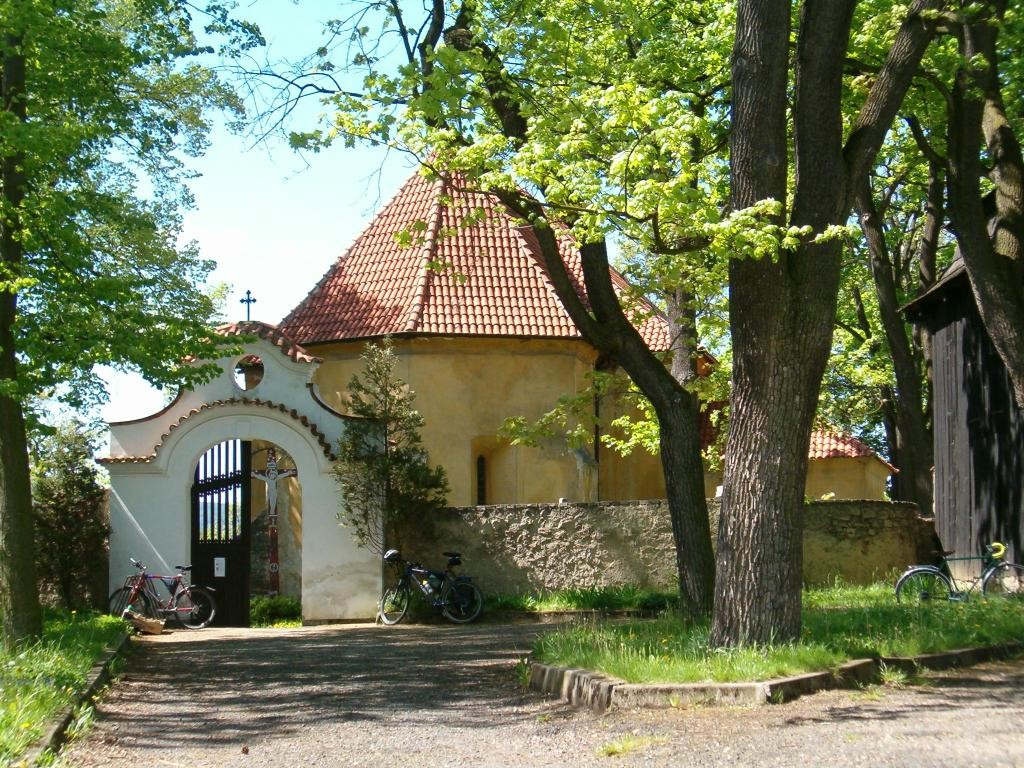
- Church of Saints Peter and Paul

- Location in the Czech Republic
- Coordinates: 49°51′9″N 14°2′12″E
- Country: Czech Republic
- Region: Central Bohemian
- District: Beroun
- First mentioned: 1331

Area
  - Total: 9.37 km^{2} (3.62 sq mi)
- Elevation: 315 m (1,033 ft)

Population (2026-01-01)
  - Total: 584
  - Density: 62.3/km^{2} (161/sq mi)
- Time zone: UTC+1 (CET)
  - Summer (DST): UTC+2 (CEST)
- Postal code: 267 24
- Website: www.obec-neumetely.cz

Neumětely is a municipality and village in Beroun District in the Central Bohemian Region of the Czech Republic. It has about 600 inhabitants.

== Etymology ==
The Czech word neumětel means a clumsy person. The name Neumětely denoted a village of such people.

== Geography ==
Neumětely is located about 12 kilometres (7 mi) south of Beroun and 33 km (21 mi) southwest of Prague. It lies in an agricultural landscape in the Hořovice Uplands. The highest point is the hill Housina at 461 m (1,512 ft) above sea level.

== History ==
The village allegedly existed in 1266, when it was a property of the Zbraslav Monastery. The first trustworthy written mention of Neumětely is from 1331. Until 1573, the village was divided into two parts, one owned by the monastery and one by various noblemen. In 1573, Mikuláš Valtr of Valtršpurk bought the second part from the monastery and united the village as part of the Lochovice estate.

== Demographics ==
Historical population

Year	Pop.	±%
1869	676	—
1880	719	+6.4%
1890	665	−7.5%
1900	689	+3.6%
1910	627	−9.0%

Year	Pop.	±%
1921	656	+4.6%
1930	591	−9.9%
1950	497	−15.9%
1961	515	+3.6%
1970	510	−1.0%

Year	Pop.	±%
1980	549	+7.6%
1991	498	−9.3%
2001	509	+2.2%
2011	548	+7.7%
2021	581	+6.0%

Source: Censuses

== Transport ==
There are no railways or major roads passing through the municipality.

== Sights ==
The main landmark of Neumětely is the Church of Saints Peter and Paul. It was originally a Gothic church from the 14th century, rebuilt in the late Baroque style in the 18th century and modified in 1887. The Gothic presbytery from the original church has been preserved. Next to the church is a separate wooden bell tower, built sometime between 1763 and 1824.
