= Faust House (Prague) =

House in Prague, Czech Republic

Mladota Palace (Faust House)
- Mladotovský palác (Faustův dům) (in Czech)
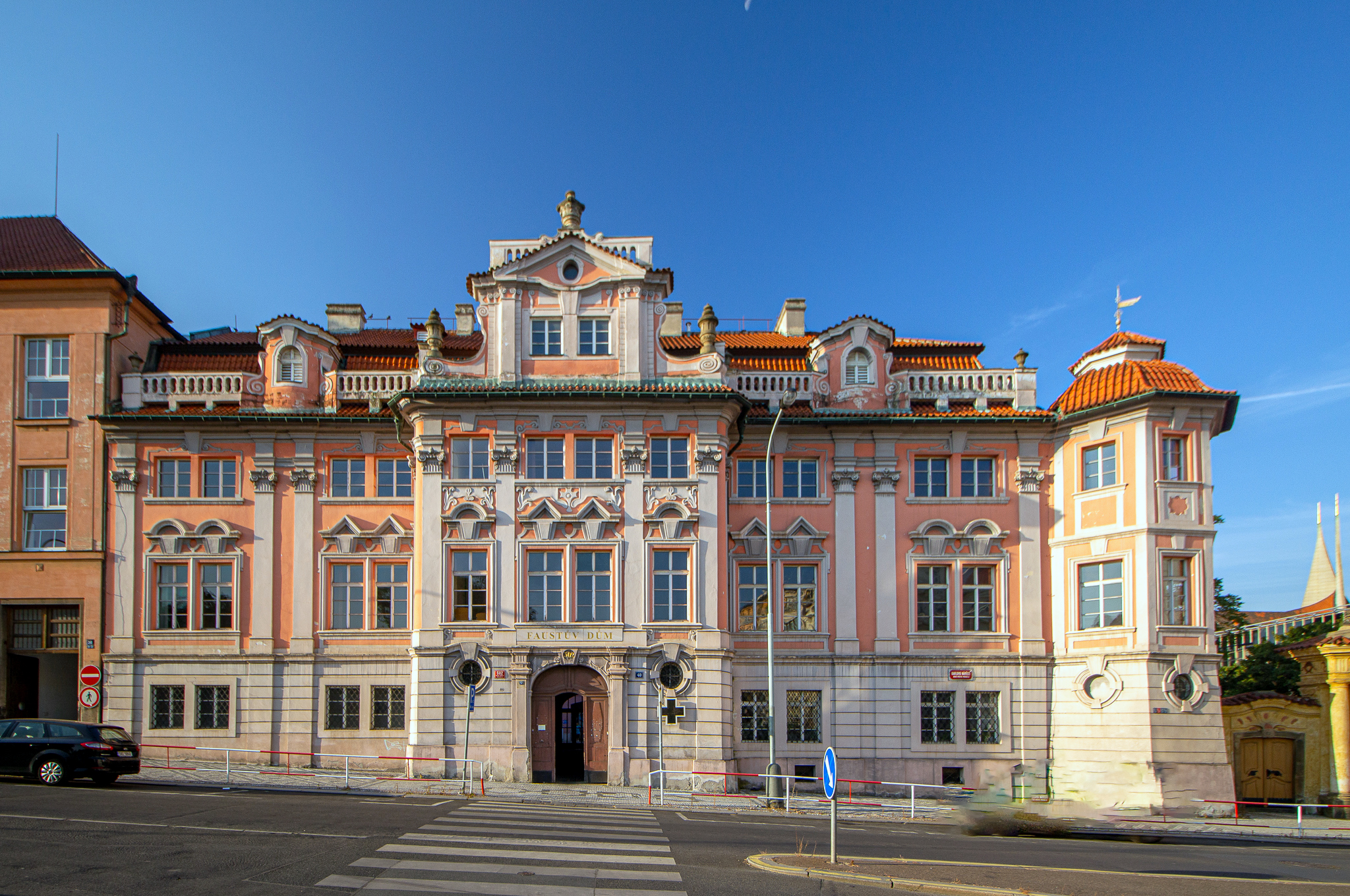
- Interactive map of the Mladota Palace (Faust House) area

General information
- Architectural style: Gothic, Renaissance, Baroque, partly Neoclassical
- Location: Charles Square, Czech Republic, Karlovo náměstí 502/40, Prague 2, 120 00
- Coordinates: 50°04′24″N 14°25′08″E
- Owner: First Faculty of Medicine, Charles University

Mladota Palace (Czech: Mladotovský palác) better known as the Faust House (Czech: Faustův dům) is a mysterious house located in Charles Square, Prague, Czech Republic. It is a Baroque mansion from the 14th century.

== House history ==
The house is a Baroque mansion from the 14th century. According to the records, it belonged to Duke Wenceslaus II of Opava-Ratibor. Many assume Dr. Faust (a.k.a. Johann Georg Faust) who was a wandering alchemist, astrologer and magician lived there, even though he probably never visited Prague. Over the years there were several notable people who lived in the house. One of them was astrologer Jakub Krucinek. He had two sons, the youngest murdered the elder due to the thought there was a treasure hidden within the house. During the time of Ferdinand I, he gave the house to his personal doctor, Jan Kopp. He was an amateur alchemist. During the 16th century there was another famous resident, Edward Kelley who was the alchemist of Emperor Rudolf II.

It is said he had a laboratory in the house causing several explosions, some of them causing holes in the house ceiling. These experiments helped the growing myth of the house. The next known person to live in the house was Ferdinand Antonin Mladota of Solopysky.

He conducted chemical experiments in the house and in its basement. Something that added to the mysterious stories about the house. The owner who brought back the rumours about the house in the 19th and 20th century was Karl Jaenig, a man with a fetish for death. He painted the walls with funeral texts, slept in a coffin and had a part of a gallows. Other residence also were considered weird and with unusual behaviour, which only added to the stories about the house. The house is closed to the public.

== Myth ==
Faust House became famous due to the mysterious stories told of the place and the people who lived there. The first one is that the famous scholar Faust sold his soul to the devil and in return acquiring powers not of this world. Johann Georg Faust was a real person but as records show he never visited Prague. More than that, it was only in the 16th century that alchemy became well known in the city. The other story related to the house is of a poor student, who had no money for rent. He got evicted from the place he rented, wondered the streets and ended at Faust House. Even though he knew the story of the devil living there, he spent the night and woke up to find a silver coin. Each morning he found another silver coin so he could buy himself, food, clothes and so on, that is how he built his wealth. He became self centred and thought he could make the devil fulfil his will, until one day he disappeared, no one knowing where and how. He was forgotten until one day a man came into the house to find the magician books open, torn clothes, broken furniture, blood stains which proved the devil had the final word.
