= Šárka (name) =

Šárka is an old female given name of Bohemian origin. Šárka is most prevalent in Slavic countries, particularly Czechia, where it is the seventy-second most common female name.

Šárka is also the name of a cliff on the northwestern outskirts of Prague. The mythological heroine, Šárka, is said to have jumped from this cliff out of remorse for helping to lure Ctirad, a local hero, into a trap.

People bearing the name include:

- Šárka Cojocarová (born 1989), Czech model
- Šárka Grossová (born 1969), Czech entrepreneur
- Šárka Kašpárková (born 1971), Czech athlete
- Šárka Musilová (born 1991), Czech Paralympic archer
- Šárka Nováková (born 1971), Czech high jumper
- Šárka Pančochová (born 1990), Czech snowboarder
- Šárka Strachová (born 1985), Czech alpine skier
- Šárka Sudová (born 1986), Czech skier
- Šárka Svobodná (born 1988), Czech orienteering competitor
- Šárka Ullrichová (born 1974), Czech actress
- Šárka Vaňková (born 1987), Czech singer
- Šárka Vondrková (born 1976), Czech ice dancer

Mythical characters

- Šárka, a mythical warrior-maiden of Bohemia, a character in The Maidens' War
