= Tursko (Prague-West District) =

- Municipality
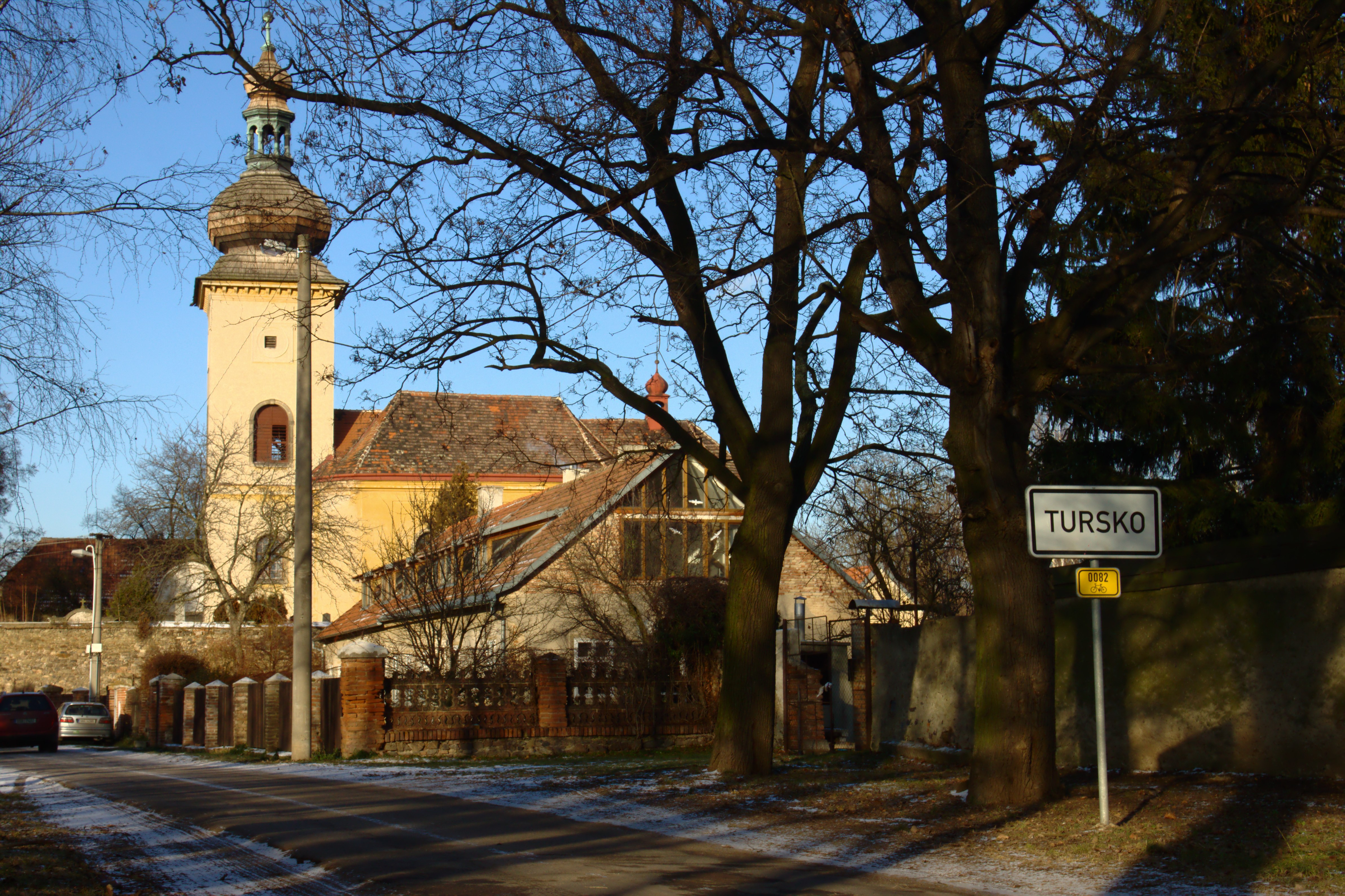
- Church of Saint Martin

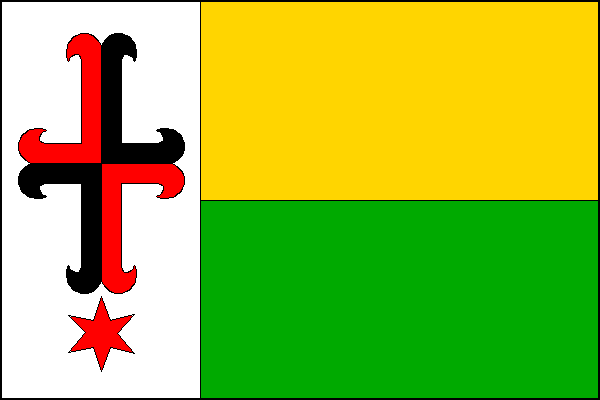
- Flag Coat of arms

- Location in the Czech Republic
- Coordinates: 50°11′29″N 14°19′19″E
- Country: Czech Republic
- Region: Central Bohemian
- District: Prague-West
- First mentioned: 1100

Area
  - Total: 8.97 km^{2} (3.46 sq mi)
- Elevation: 294 m (965 ft)

Population (2026-01-01)
  - Total: 998
  - Density: 111/km^{2} (288/sq mi)
- Time zone: UTC+1 (CET)
  - Summer (DST): UTC+2 (CEST)
- Postal code: 252 65
- Website: www.tursko.cz

Tursko is a municipality and village in Prague-West District in the Central Bohemian Region of the Czech Republic. It has about 1,000 inhabitants.

== Demographics ==
Historical population
Year	Pop.	±%
1869	574	—
1880	567	−1.2%
1890	624	+10.1%
1900	679	+8.8%
1910	649	−4.4%
1921	613	−5.5%
1930	693	+13.1%
1950	513	−26.0%
1961	566	+10.3%
1970	558	−1.4%
1980	546	−2.2%
1991	498	−8.8%
2001	497	−0.2%
2011	791	+59.2%
2021	858	+8.5%
Source: Censuses
