= Prague =

Capital and largest city of the Czech Republic

Prague Praha (Czech)
- Capital city
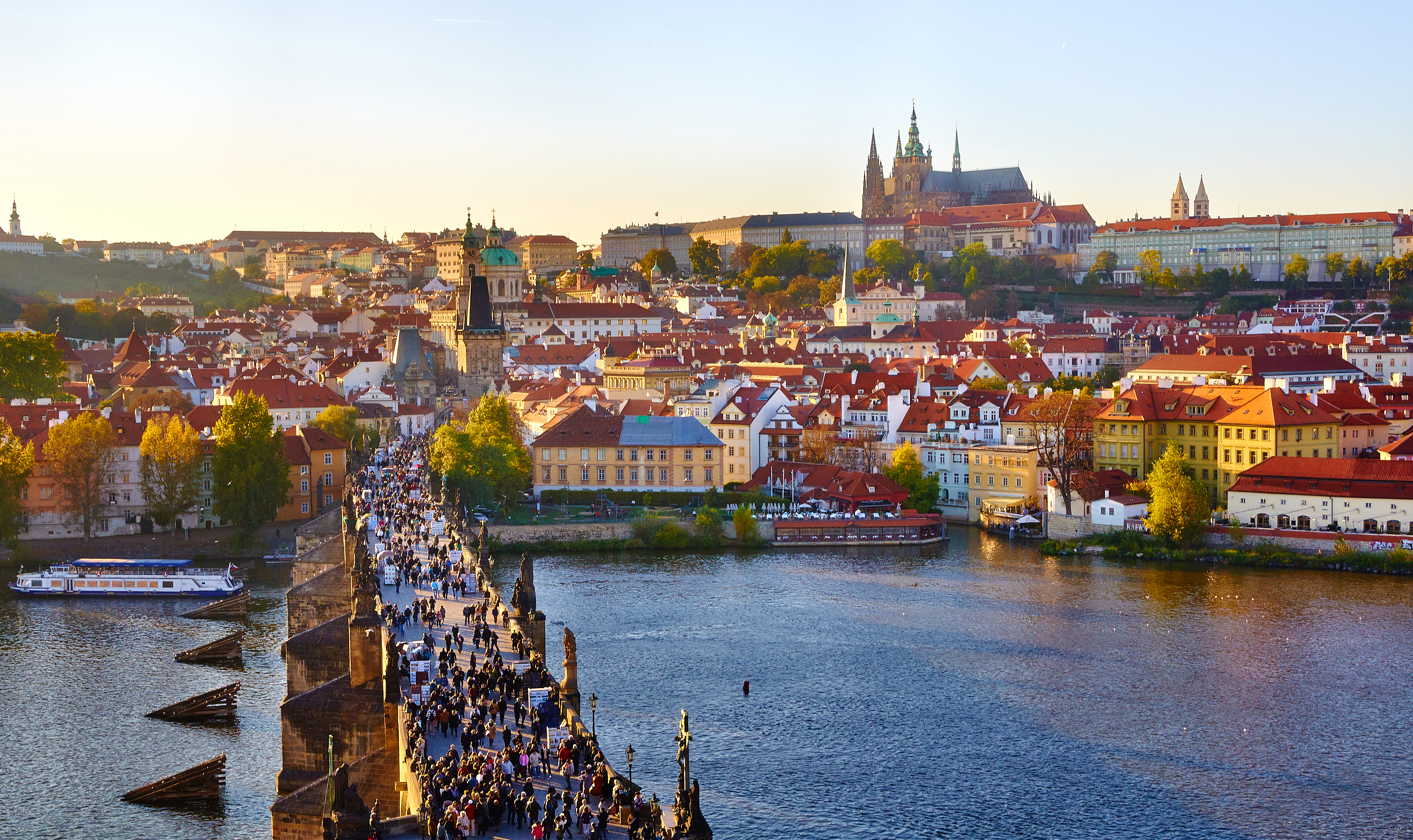
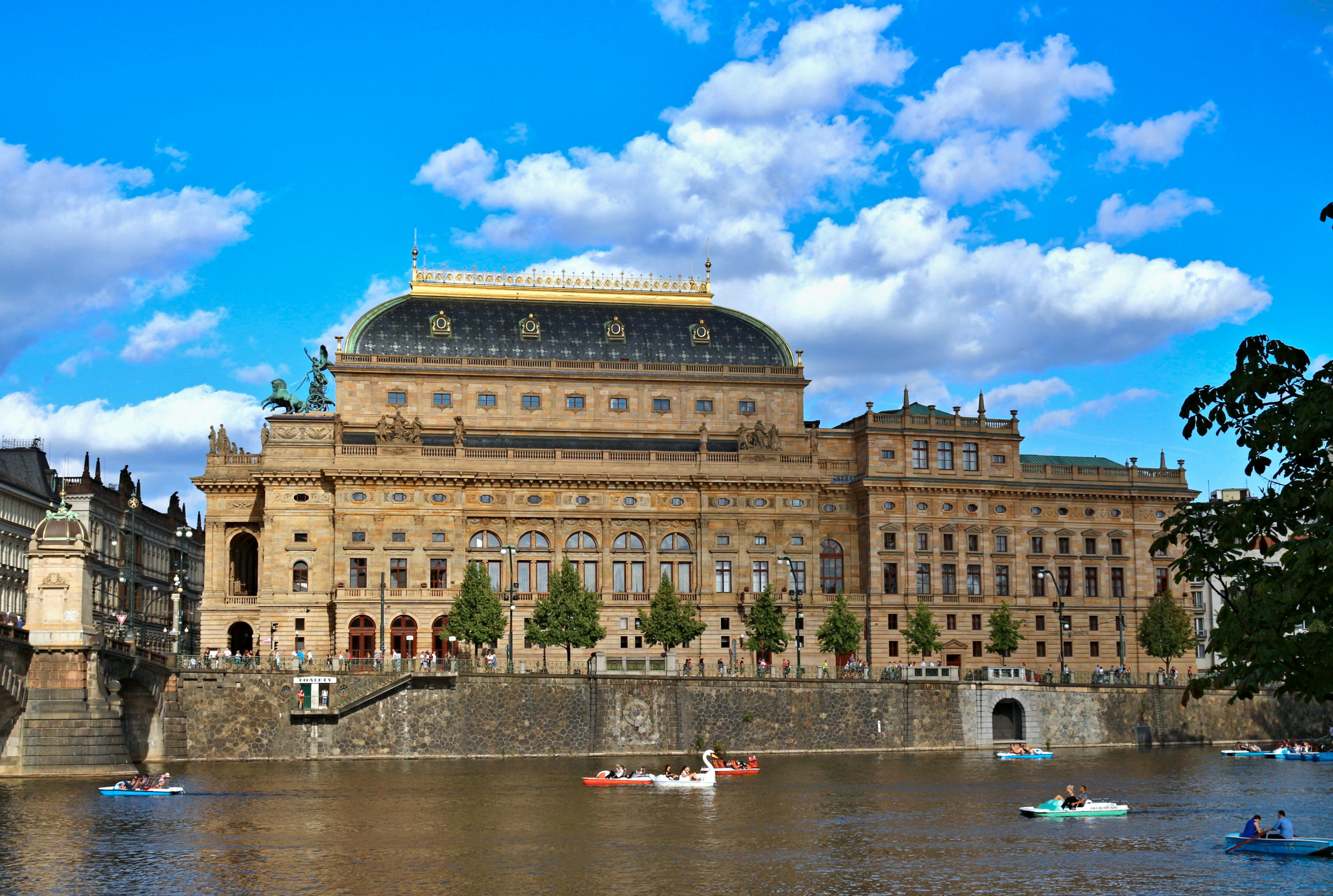
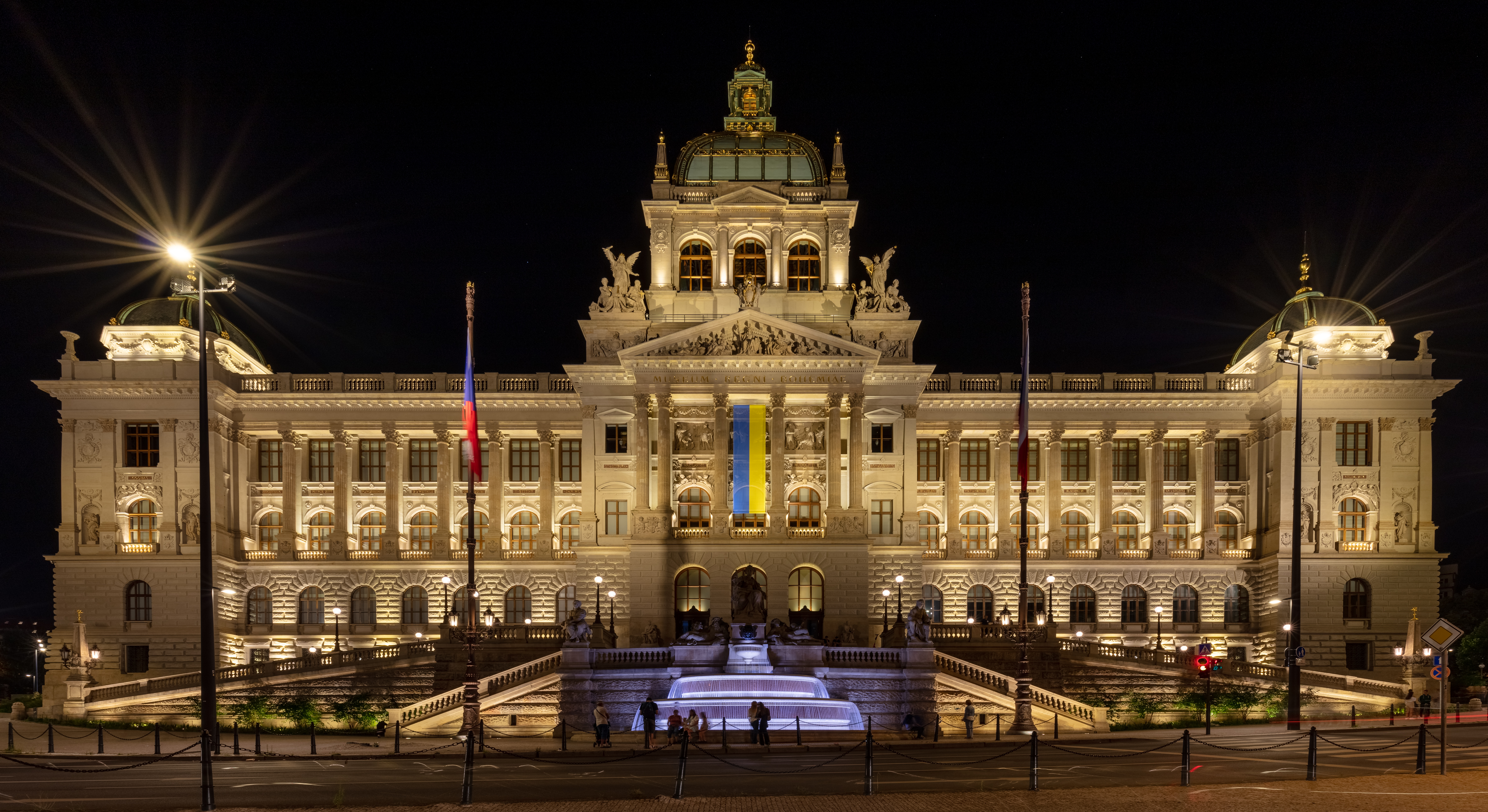
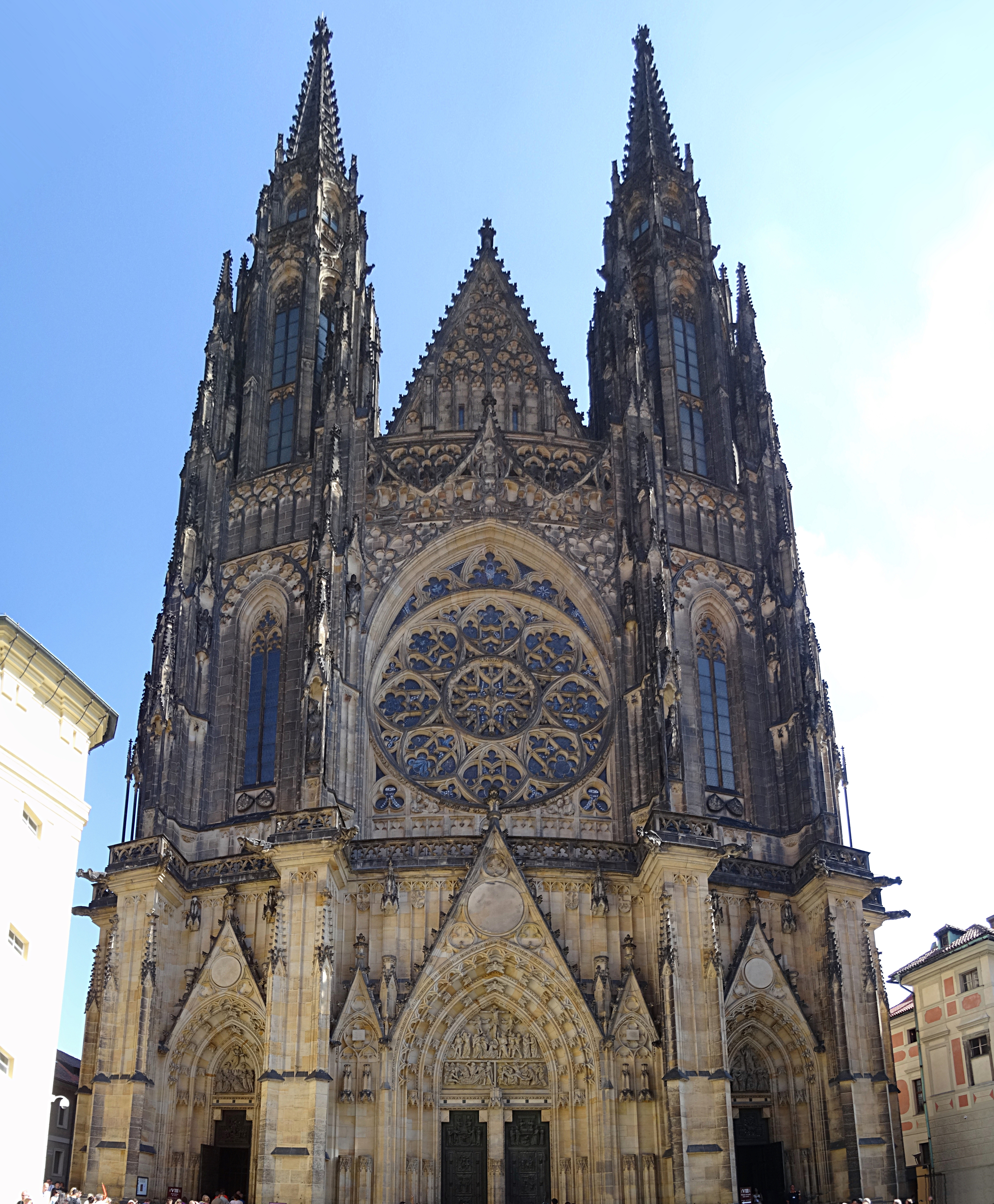
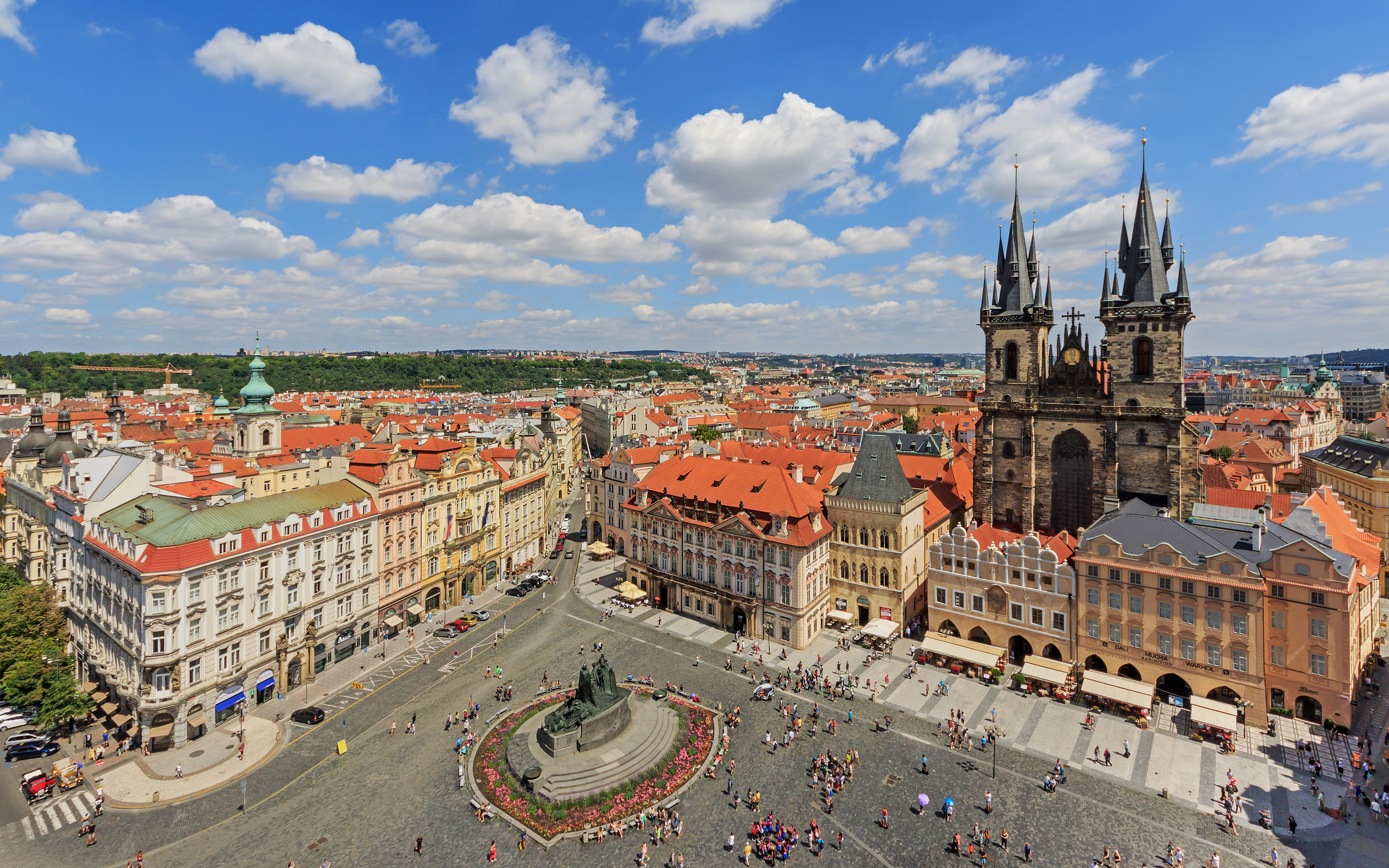
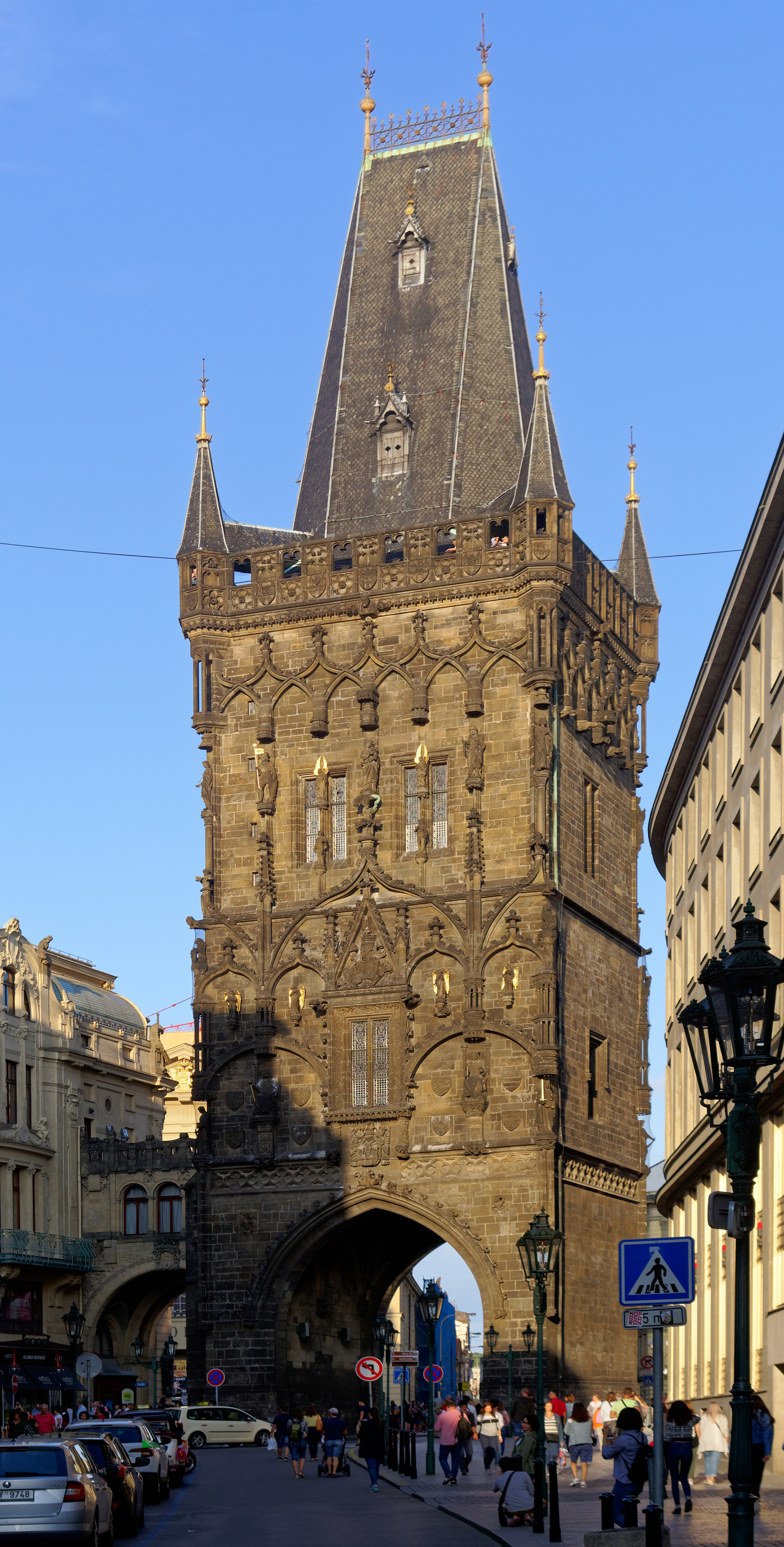
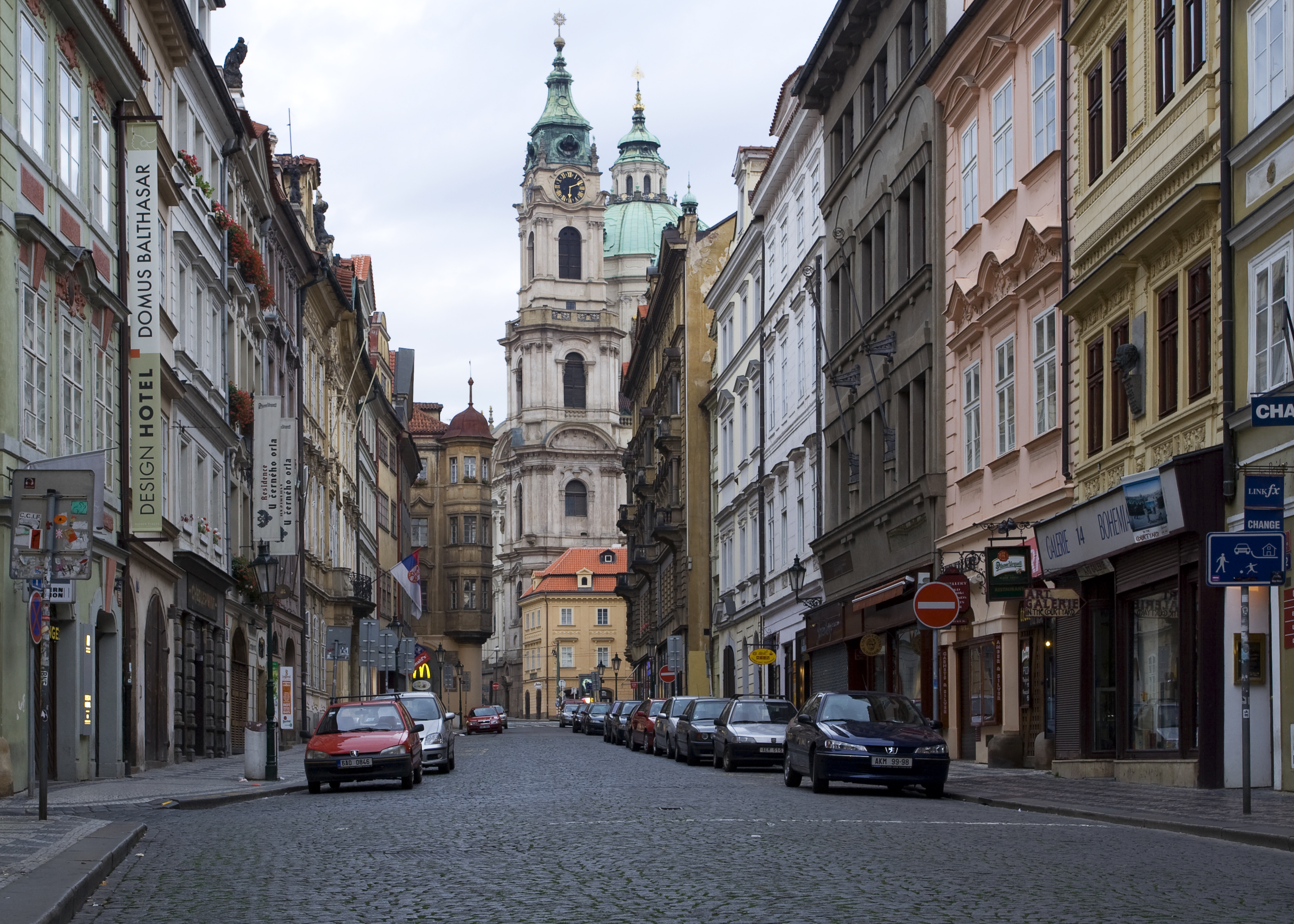
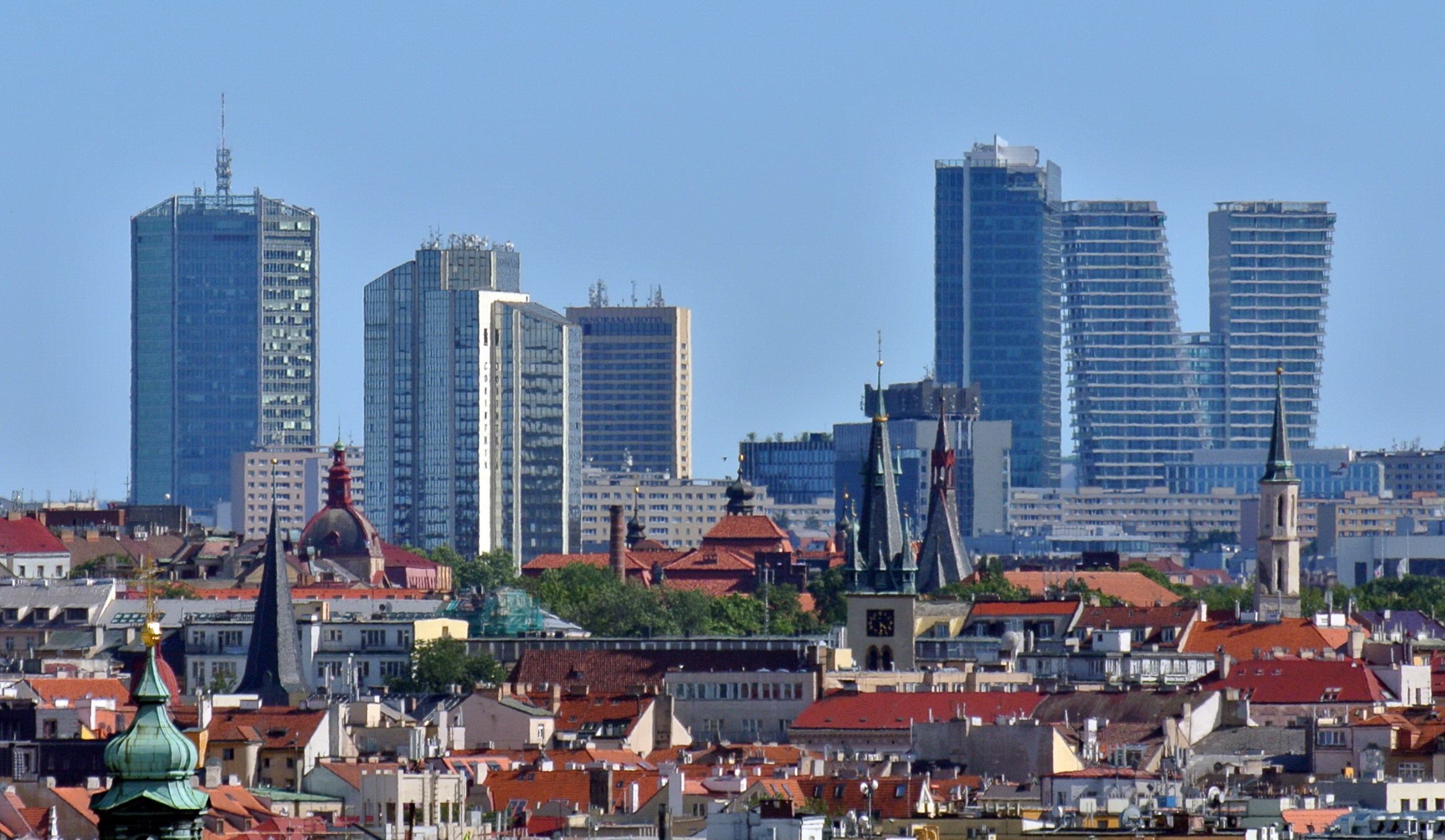
- Panorama with Charles Bridge and Prague Castle National Theatre National Museum St. Vitus Cathedral Old Town Square Powder Tower Malá Strana Pankrác district

- Flag Coat of arms Wordmark
- Nickname: City of a Hundred Spires
- Mottoes: "Praga Caput Rei publicae" (Latin) "Prague, Head of the Republic" other historical mottos: "Praga mater urbium" (Latin) "Praha matka měst" (Czech) "Prague, Mother of Cities"; "Praga Caput Regni" (Latin) "Prague, Head of the Kingdom"
- Location within Czech Republic Location within Europe
- Coordinates: 50°5′15″N 14°25′17″E
- Country: Czech Republic
- Founded: 8th century

Government
  - Mayor: Petr Hlaváček (STAN)

Area
  - Capital city: 496.21 km^{2} (191.59 sq mi)
  - Urban: 298 km^{2} (115 sq mi)
  - Metro: 11,425 km^{2} (4,411 sq mi)
- Highest elevation: 399 m (1,309 ft)
- Lowest elevation: 172 m (564 ft)

Population (2026-01-01)
  - Capital city: 1,407,084
  - Rank: 1st (12th in EU)
  - Density: 2,835.7/km^{2} (7,344.3/sq mi)
  - Metro: 2,267,817
  - Metro density: 237/km^{2} (610/sq mi)
- Demonym(s): Praguer, Pragueite; Pražan (male); Pražanka (female)

GDP (Nominal, 2024)
  - Capital city: €86.6 billion (US$97.74 billion)
  - Per capita: €61,948 (US$69,918.74)
- Time zone: UTC+01:00 (CET)
  - Summer (DST): UTC+02:00 (CEST)
- Postal codes: 100 00 – 199 00
- ISO 3166 code: CZ-10
- Vehicle registration: A, AA – AZ
- HDI (2023): 0.975 – very high · 1st
- Website: praha.eu

UNESCO World Heritage Site
- Official name: Historic Centre of Prague
- Type: Cultural
- Criteria: ii, iv, vi
- Designated: 1992 (16th session)
- Reference no.: 616
- Area: 1,106.36 ha (2,733.9 acres)
- UNESCO Region: Europe and North America

Prague (/ˈprɑːɡ/ PRAHG; Czech: Praha [ˈpraɦa]) (Note: German: Prag, Latin: Praga) is the capital and largest city of the Czech Republic and the historical capital of Bohemia. Located on the Vltava River, the city has a population of about 1.4 million, making it the twelfth-largest city in the European Union. Its metropolitan area is home to approximately 2.3 million people.

Prague is a historical city with Romanesque, Gothic, Renaissance, and Baroque architecture. It was the capital of the Kingdom of Bohemia and residence of several Holy Roman Emperors, most notably Charles IV (r. 1346–1378) and Rudolf II (r. 1575–1611). It was an important city to the Habsburg monarchy and Austria-Hungary. The city played major roles in the Bohemian and Protestant Reformations, the Thirty Years' War, and in 20th-century history as the capital of Czechoslovakia during the interwar period and the post-World War II Communist era.

Prague is home to a number of cultural attractions including Prague Castle, Charles Bridge, Old Town Square with the Prague astronomical clock, the Jewish Quarter, Petřín hill, and Vyšehrad. Since 1992, the historic centre of Prague has been included in the UNESCO list of World Heritage Sites. The city has more than ten major museums, along with numerous theatres, galleries, cinemas, and other historical exhibits. An extensive modern public transportation system connects the city. It is home to a wide range of public and private schools, including Charles University, the oldest university in Central Europe.

Prague is classified as a "Beta+" global city according to GaWC studies. Its rich history makes it a popular tourist destination, and as of 2017, the city receives more than 8.5 million international visitors annually. In 2017, Prague was listed as the fifth most visited European city after London, Paris, Rome, and Istanbul.

== Etymology and names ==
According to a popular legend, which first appeared in Chronica Boemorum (1119–1125) of Cosmas of Prague, the Czech name Praha is derived from the Czech word práh (meaning 'threshold'). In the 18th century, Josef Dobrovský's theory was accepted, according to which the name is derived from the old Slavic word práh. This word means 'ford' or 'rapid', referring to the city's origin at a crossing point of the Vltava river and to the rapids of the Vltava. Since the 19th century, the accepted theory has been that the name is derived from the old Czech verb pražiti ('to burn') and from vypražený les ('burned forest'), referring to a forest that was burned down so a settlement could be established there. In the mid-20th century, linguist Antonín Profous corrected the theory by saying that the name is indeed derived from pražiti, but this word also means 'to roast' (when speaking about the sun), and the name denoted a hot, arid place (related to the shale bedrock where the Prague Castle was founded).

Prague is nicknamed the "City of a Hundred Spires," based on a count by 19th-century mathematician Bernard Bolzano; today's count is estimated by the Prague Information Service at 500. Other nicknames for Prague also include the Golden City, the Mother of Cities and the Heart of Europe.

The local Jewish community, which belongs to one of the oldest continuously existing in the world, has described the city as עיר ואם בישראל Ir va-em be-yisrael, "The city and mother in Israel".

== History ==
Prague has grown from a settlement stretching from Prague Castle in the north to the fort of Vyšehrad in the south, to become the capital of a modern European country. With archaeological deposits over 10m deep, the city serves as a model for the implementation of comprehensive regulations for the protection of archaeological heritage throughout the Czech Republic.

=== Early history ===
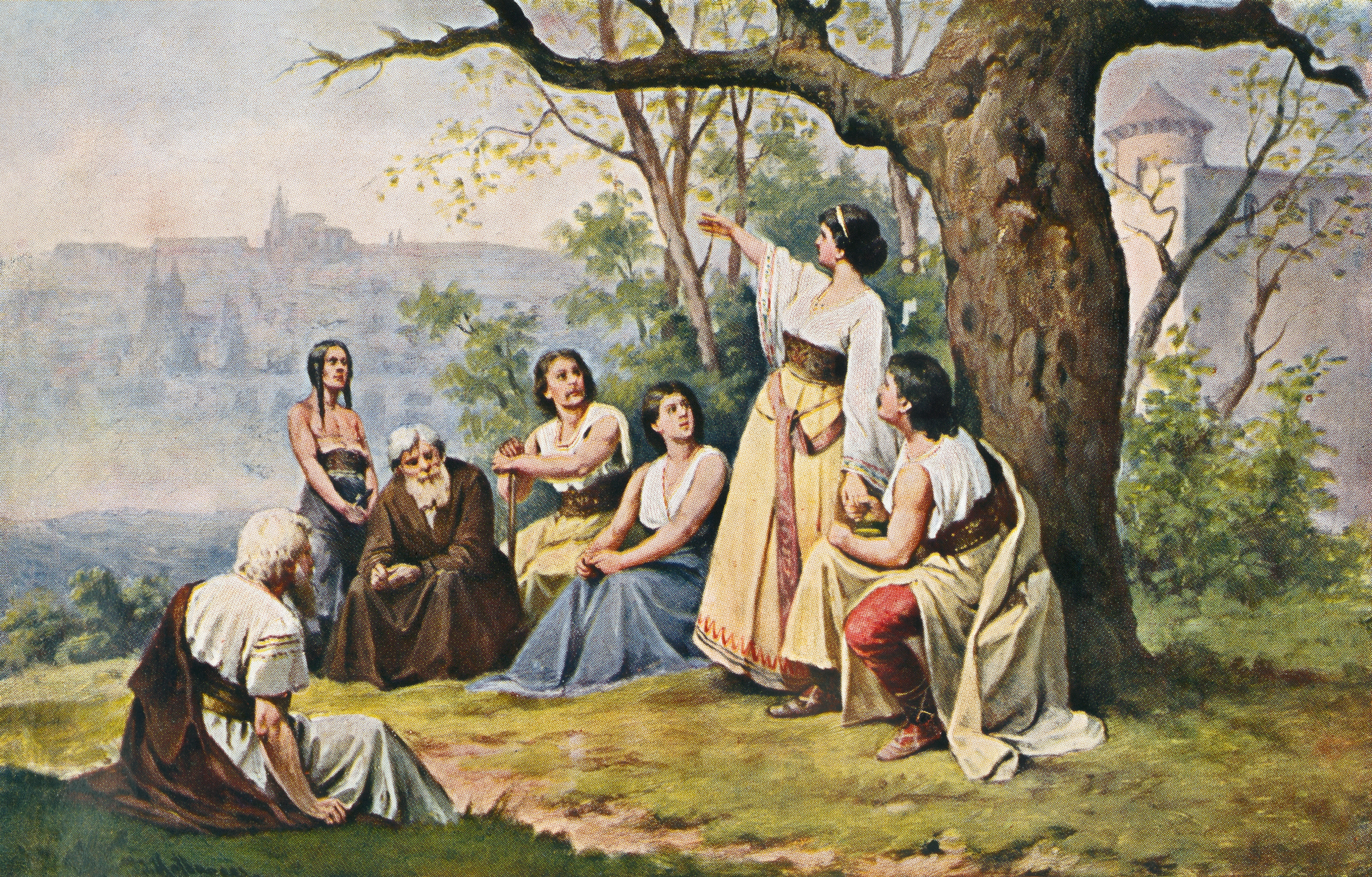
The mythological princess Libuše prophesies the glory of Prague.

The region was settled as early as the Paleolithic age. Jewish chronicler David Solomon Ganz, citing Cyriacus Spangenberg, claimed that the city was founded as Boihaem in c. 1306 BC by an ancient king, Boyya.

Around the fifth and fourth century BC, a Celtic tribe appeared in the area, later establishing settlements, including the largest Celtic oppidum in Bohemia, Závist, in a present-day Dolní Břežany south of Prague, and naming the region of Bohemia, which means "home of the Boii people". In the last century BC, the Celts were slowly driven away by Germanic tribes (Marcomanni, Quadi, Lombards and possibly the Suebi), leading some to place the seat of the Marcomanni king, Maroboduus, in Závist. Around the area where present-day Prague stands, the 2nd century map drawn by Roman geographer Ptolemaios mentioned a Germanic city called Casurgis.

In the late 5th century AD, during the great Migration Period following the collapse of the Western Roman Empire, the Germanic tribes living in Bohemia moved westwards and, probably in the 6th century, the Slavic tribes settled the Central Bohemian Region. In the following three centuries, the Czech tribes built several fortified settlements in the area, most notably in the Šárka valley, Butovice, and Levý Hradec.

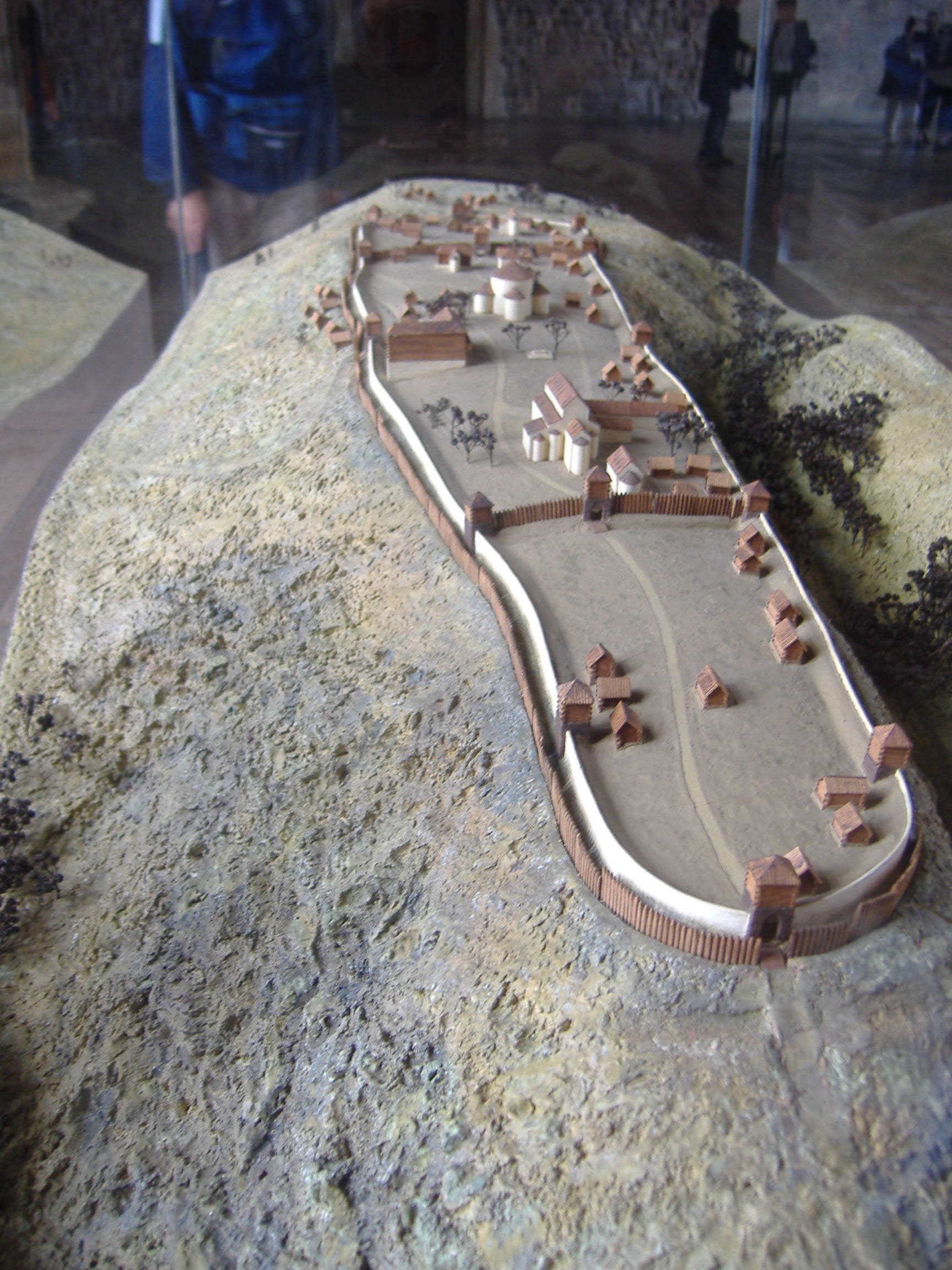
A model representing Prague Castle and its surroundings in the 10th century

The construction of what came to be known as Prague Castle began near the end of the 9th century, expanding a fortified settlement that had existed on the site since the year 800. The first masonry under Prague Castle dates from the year 885 at the latest. The other prominent Prague fort, the Přemyslid fort Vyšehrad, was founded in the 10th century, some 70 years later than Prague Castle. Prague Castle is dominated by the cathedral, which began construction in 1344, but was not completed until the 20th century.

The legendary origins of Prague attribute its foundation to the 8th-century Czech duchess and prophetess Libuše and her husband, Přemysl, founder of the Přemyslid dynasty. Legend says that Libuše, prophesied from her castle at Vyšehrad, came out on a rocky cliff high above the Vltava and prophesied: "I see a great city whose glory will touch the stars". She ordered a castle and a town called Praha to be built on the site.

The region became the seat of the dukes, and later kings of Bohemia. Under Duke of Bohemia Boleslaus II the Pious the area became a bishopric in 973. Until Prague was elevated to archbishopric in 1344, it was under the jurisdiction of the Archbishopric of Mainz.

Prague was an important seat for trading where merchants from across Europe settled, including many Jews, as recalled in 965 by the Hispano-Jewish merchant and traveller Abraham ben Jacob. The Old New Synagogue of 1270 still stands in the city. Prague was once home to a slave market that traded in Slavic slaves as part of the Prague slave trade.

At the site of the ford in the Vltava river, King Vladislaus I had the first bridge built in 1170, the Judith Bridge (Juditin most), named in honour of his wife Judith of Thuringia. This bridge was destroyed by a flood in 1342, but some of the original foundation stones of that bridge remain in the river. It was rebuilt and named the Charles Bridge.

In 1257, under King Ottokar II, Malá Strana ('lesser quarter') was founded in Prague on the site of an older village in what would become the Hradčany (Prague Castle) area. This was the district of the German people, who had the right to administer the law autonomously, pursuant to Magdeburg rights. The new district was on the bank opposite of the Staré Město ("Old Town"), which had borough status and was bordered by a line of walls and fortifications.

=== Late Middle Ages ===
The current St. Vitus Cathedral in Prague was founded in 1344.

Prague flourished during the 14th-century reign (1346–1378) of Charles IV, Holy Roman Emperor and the king of Bohemia of the new Luxembourg dynasty. As King of Bohemia and Holy Roman Emperor, he transformed Prague into an imperial capital. In the 1470s, Prague had around 70,000 inhabitants and with an area of 360 ha (~1.4 square miles) it was the third-largest city in the Holy Roman Empire.

Charles IV ordered the building of the New Town (Nové Město) adjacent to the Old Town and laid out the design himself. The Charles Bridge, replacing the Judith Bridge destroyed in the flood just before his reign, was erected to connect the east bank districts to the Malá Strana and castle area. In 1347, he founded Charles University, the oldest university in Central Europe.

His father John of Bohemia began construction of the Gothic Saint Vitus Cathedral, within the largest of the Prague Castle courtyards, on the site of the Romanesque rotunda. Prague was elevated to an archbishopric in 1344, the year the cathedral was begun.

The city had a mint and was a centre of trade for German and Italian bankers and merchants. The social order, however, became more turbulent due to the rising power of the craft guilds (themselves often torn by internal conflicts), and the increasing number of poor.

The Hunger Wall, a substantial fortification wall south of Malá Strana and the castle area, was built during a famine in the 1360s. The work is reputed to have been ordered by Charles IV as a means of providing employment and food to the workers and their families.

Charles IV died in 1378. During the reign of his son, King Wenceslaus IV (1378–1419), a period of intense turmoil ensued. During Easter 1389, members of the Prague clergy announced that Jews had desecrated the host (Eucharistic wafer), and the clergy encouraged mobs to pillage, ransack, and burn the Jewish quarter. Nearly the entire Jewish population of Prague (ca 750 people) was murdered.

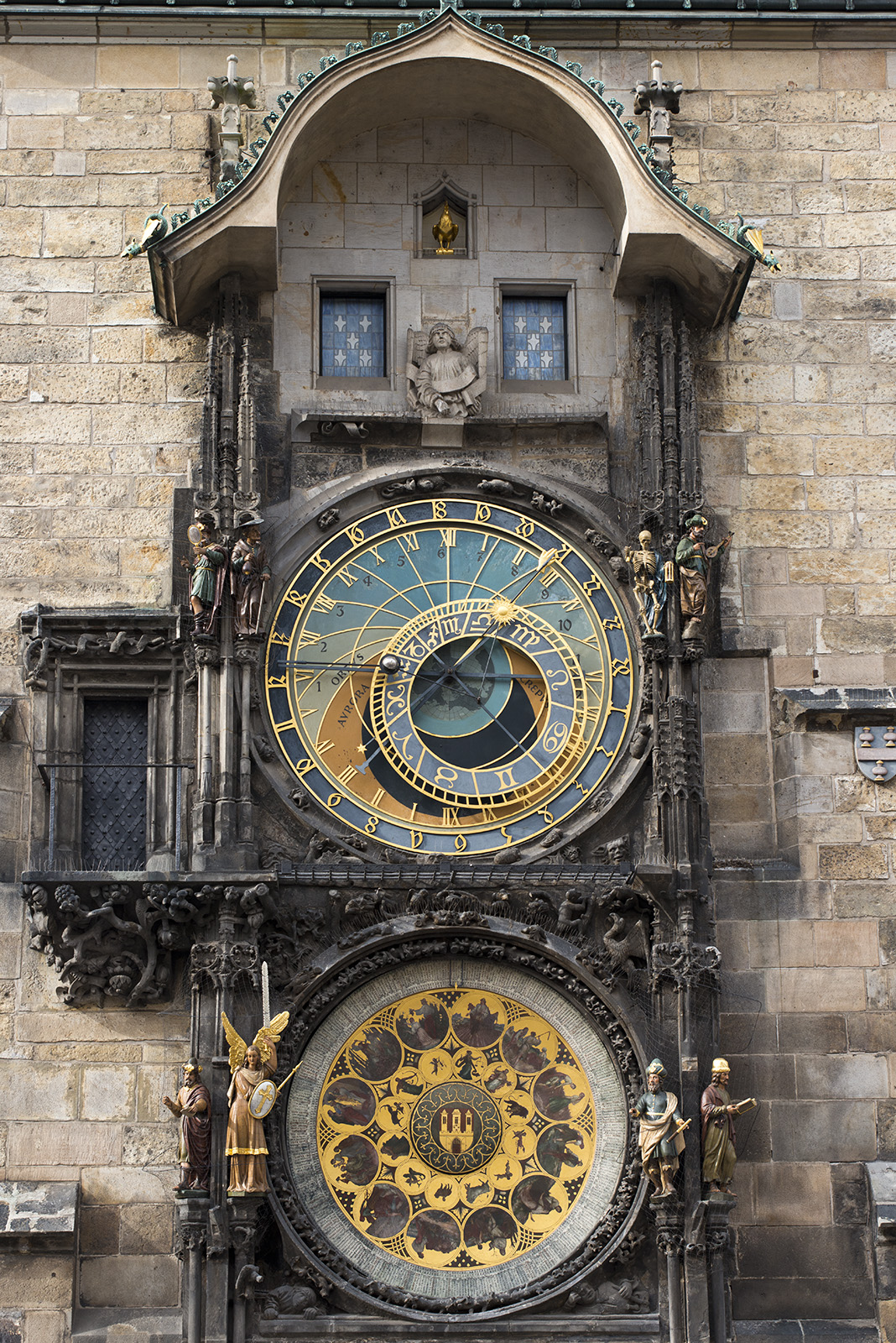
The Prague astronomical clock was first installed in 1410, making it the third-oldest astronomical clock in the world and the oldest one still working.

Jan Hus, a theologian and rector at Charles University, preached in Prague. In 1402, he began giving sermons in the Bethlehem Chapel. Inspired by John Wycliffe, these sermons focused on what were seen as radical reforms of a corrupt Church. Having become too dangerous for the political and religious establishment, Hus was summoned to the Council of Constance, put on trial for heresy, and burned at the stake in Konstanz in 1415.

Four years later, Prague experienced its first defenestration, when the people rebelled under the command of the Prague priest Jan Želivský. Hus' death, coupled with Czech proto-nationalism and proto-Protestantism, had spurred the Hussite Wars. Peasant rebels, led by the general Jan Žižka, along with Hussite troops from Prague, defeated Emperor Sigismund in the Battle of Vítkov Hill in 1420.

During the Hussite Wars, when Prague was attacked by "Crusader" and mercenary forces, the city militia fought bravely under the Prague Banner. This swallow-tailed banner is approximately 4 by 6 ft (1.2 by 1.8 m), with a red field sprinkled with small white fleurs-de-lis, and a silver old Town Coat-of-Arms in the centre. The words "PÁN BŮH POMOC NAŠE" (The Lord is our Relief/Help) appeared above the coat-of-arms, with a Hussite chalice centred on the top. Near the swallow-tails is a crescent-shaped golden sun with rays protruding.

One of these banners was captured by Swedish troops during the Battle of Prague (1648) when they captured the western bank of the Vltava river and were repulsed from the eastern bank; it was placed in the Royal Military Museum in Stockholm. Although this flag still exists, it is in very poor condition. They also took the Codex Gigas and the Codex Argenteus. The earliest evidence indicates that a gonfalon with a municipal charge painted on it was used for the Old Town as early as 1419. Since this city militia flag was in use before 1477 and during the Hussite Wars, it is the oldest still preserved municipal flag of Bohemia.

In the following two centuries, Prague strengthened its role as a merchant city. Many noteworthy Gothic buildings were erected and Vladislav Hall of the Prague Castle was added. The coat of arms was first introduced in the 15th century, when Prague consisted of what is now the Old Town district.

=== Habsburg era ===
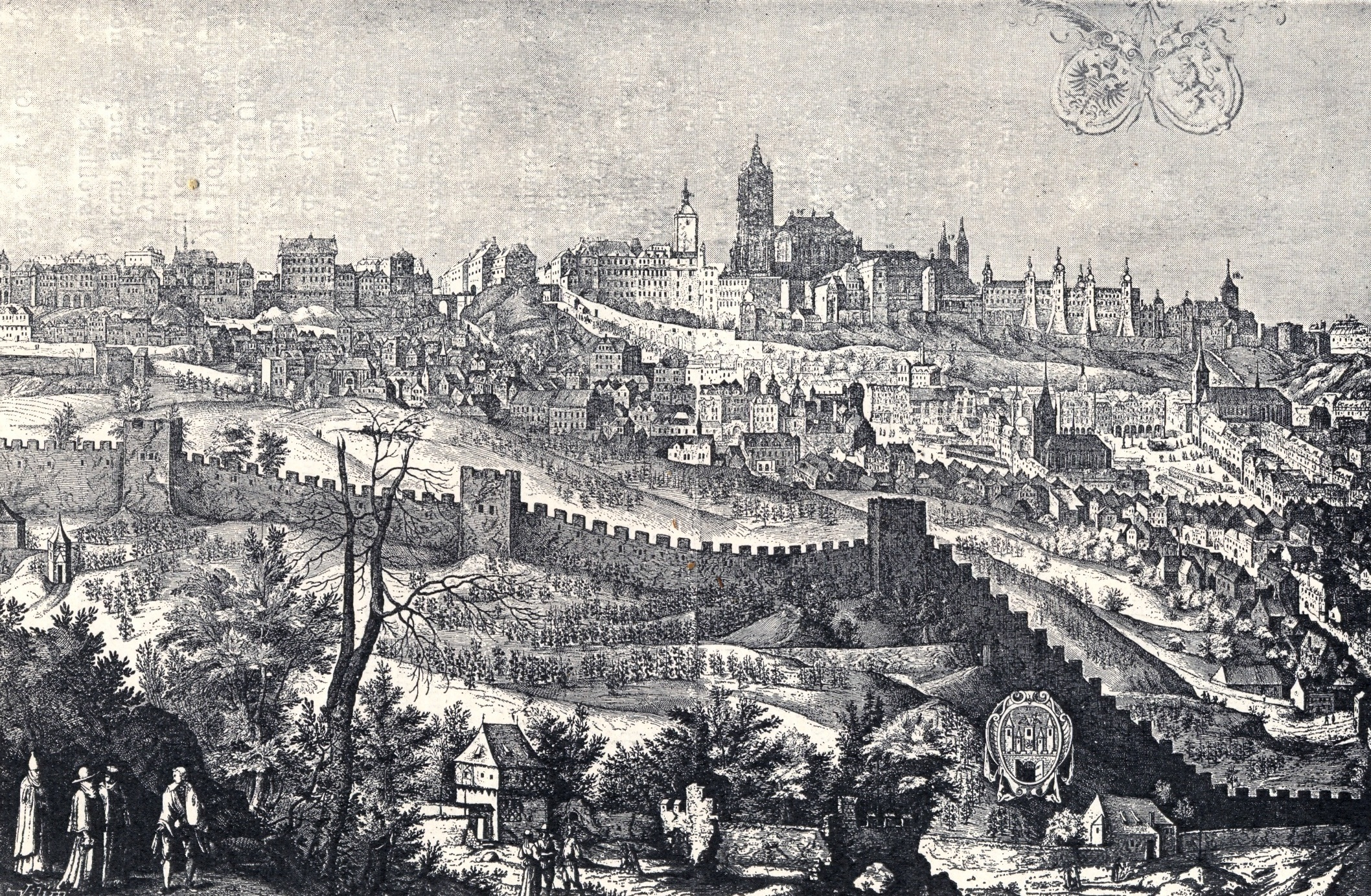
Prague Castle and Malá Strana in 1607, by Aegidius Sadeler

In 1526, the Bohemian estates elected Ferdinand I of the House of Habsburg. The fervent Catholicism of its members brought them into conflict in Bohemia, and then in Prague, where Protestant ideas were gaining popularity. These problems were not preeminent under Holy Roman Emperor Rudolf II, elected King of Bohemia in 1576, who chose Prague as his home. He lived in Prague Castle, where his court welcomed not only astrologers and magicians but also scientists, musicians, and artists. Rudolf was an art lover as well, and Prague became a capital of European culture. This was a prosperous period for the city: famous people living there in that age include the astronomers Tycho Brahe and Johannes Kepler, the painter Arcimboldo, the alchemists Edward Kelley and John Dee, the poet Elizabeth Jane Weston, and others.

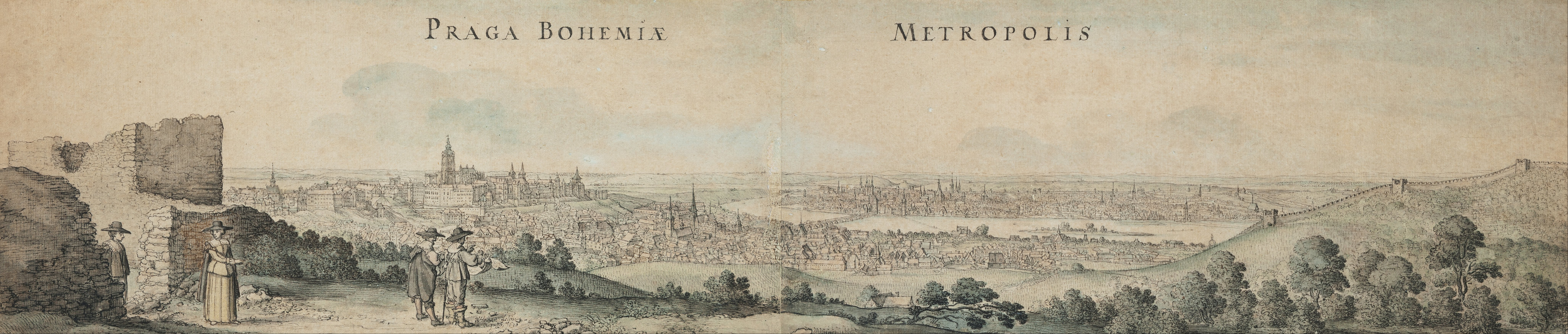
Wenceslaus Hollar created the Great View of Prague based on his drawings from a 1636 visit

In 1618, the famous second defenestration of Prague provoked the Thirty Years' War, a particularly harsh period for Prague and Bohemia. Ferdinand II of Habsburg was deposed, and his place as King of Bohemia taken by Frederick V, Elector Palatine; however, his army was crushed in the Battle of White Mountain (1620) not far from the city. Following this, in 1621, was the execution of 27 Czech Protestant leaders (involved in the uprising) in Old Town Square and the exile of many others. Prague was forcibly converted back to Roman Catholicism, followed by the rest of the Czech lands. The city came under attack by the Electorate of Saxony in 1631 and suffered further damage during the Swedish siege of Prague in 1648. Prague began a steady decline, which reduced the population from the 60,000 it had had in the years before the war to 20,000. In the second half of the 17th century, Prague's population began to grow again. Jews had been in Prague since the end of the 10th century and, by 1708, they accounted for about a quarter of Prague's population.

View of Prague from the southwest in 1686, by the Dutch painter Folbert van Alten-Allen

In 1689, a great fire devastated Prague, which spurred a renovation and a rebuilding of the city. In 1713–14, a major outbreak of plague hit Prague one last time, killing 12,000 to 13,000 people.

In 1741, during the War of the Austrian Succession, Prague was occupied by French forces, which withdrew from the city in December 1742. In 1744, Frederick the Great of Prussia invaded Bohemia. He took Prague after a severe and prolonged siege in the course of which a large part of the town was destroyed. Empress Maria Theresa expelled the Jews from Prague in 1745; though she rescinded the expulsion in 1748, the proportion of Jewish residents in the city never recovered. In 1757, during the Seven Years' War, Prussian bombardment destroyed more than one-quarter of the city and heavily damaged St. Vitus Cathedral. However, a month later, Frederick the Great was defeated and forced to retreat from Bohemia.

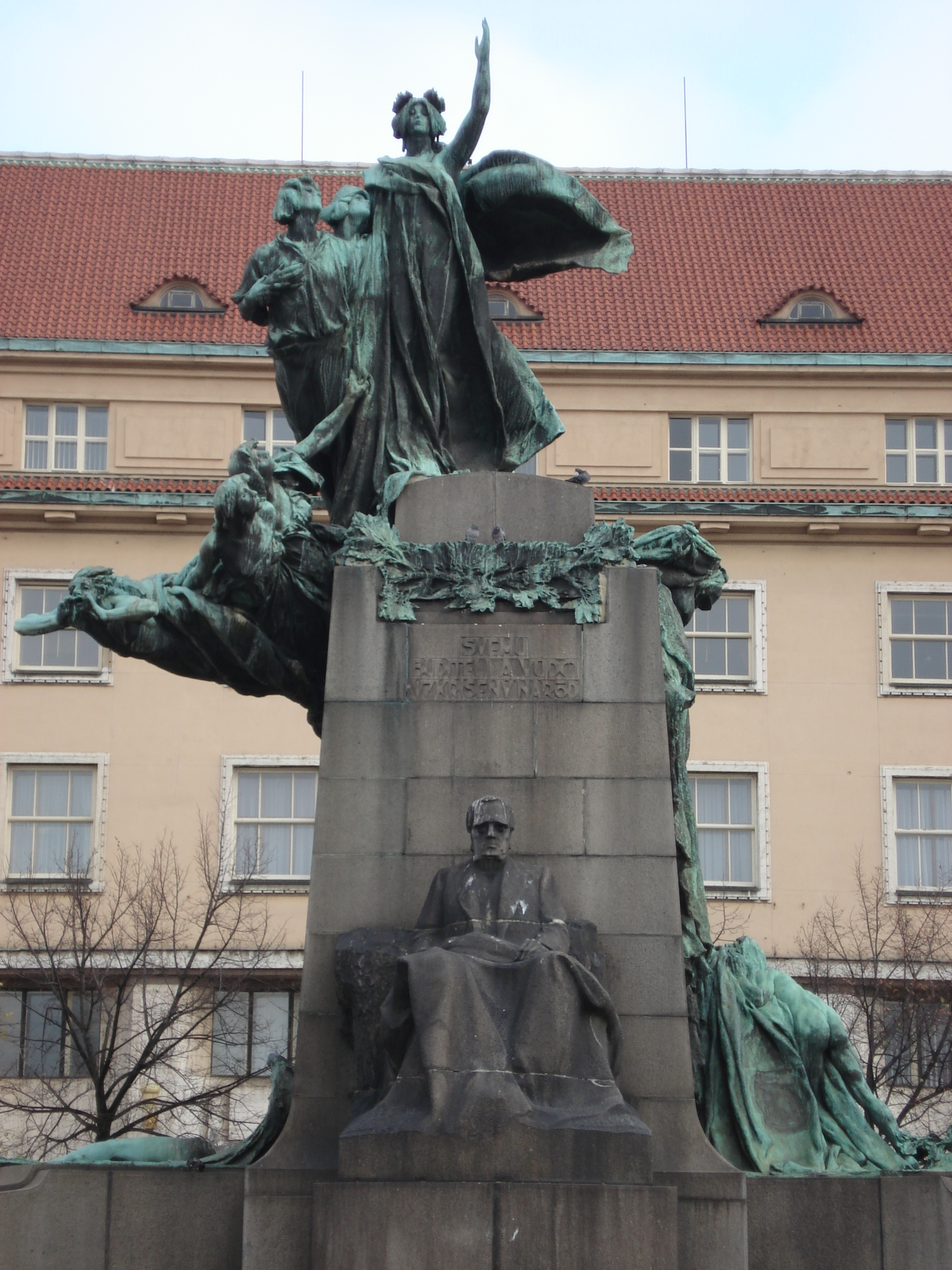
Monument to František Palacký, a significant member of the Czech National Revival, created by Stanislav Sucharda

The economy of Prague continued to improve during the 18th century. The population increased to 80,000 inhabitants by 1771. Many rich merchants and nobles enhanced the city with a host of palaces, churches, and gardens full of art and music, creating the Baroque city features.

In 1784, under Joseph II, the four municipalities of Malá Strana, Nové Město, Staré Město, and Hradčany were merged into a single entity. The Jewish district, called Josefov, was included only in 1850. The Industrial Revolution produced great changes and developments in Prague, as new factories could take advantage of the coal mines and ironworks of the nearby regions. The first general hospital was founded in 1789, with a reconstructed building of the Institute for Noble Women in the Church of the Holy Angels (now Všeobecná fakultní nemocnice v Praze) used for it. The first suburb, Karlín, was created in 1817, and twenty years later the population exceeded 100,000.

The revolutions in Europe in 1848 also touched Prague, but they were fiercely suppressed. In the following years, the Czech National Revival began its rise, until it gained the majority in the town council in 1861. Prague had a large number of German speakers in 1848, but by 1880 the number of German speakers had decreased to 14 percent (42,000), and by 1910 to 6.7 percent (37,000), due to a massive increase in the city's overall population caused by the influx of Czechs from the rest of Bohemia and Moravia and the increasing prestige and importance of the Czech language as part of the Czech National Revival. In 1891, the city council ordered that all German inscriptions be removed in Prague, while Czechs at the same time demanded equal status for the Czech and German languages in Bohemia and Moravia.

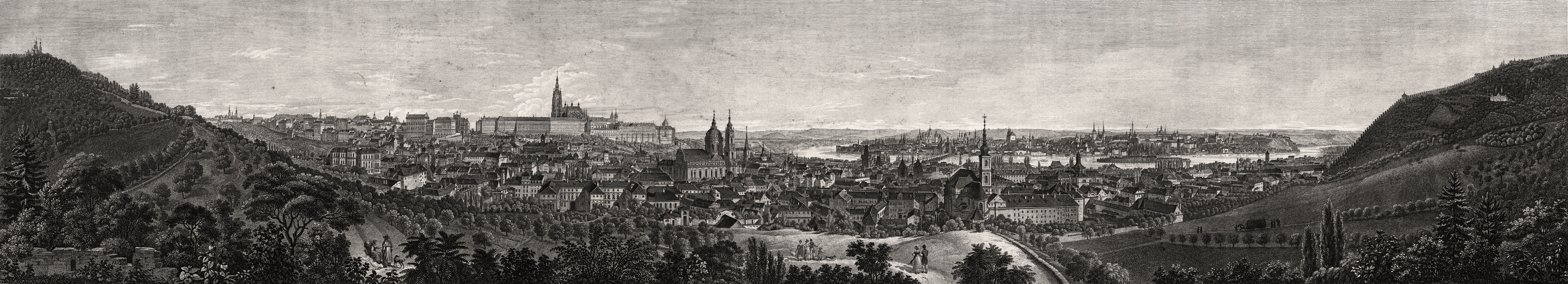
Panorama of Prague from the Schönborn Garden, c. 1835. The drawing by Czech vedutist Vincenc Morstadt was engraved by Friedrich Geissler.

=== 20th century ===
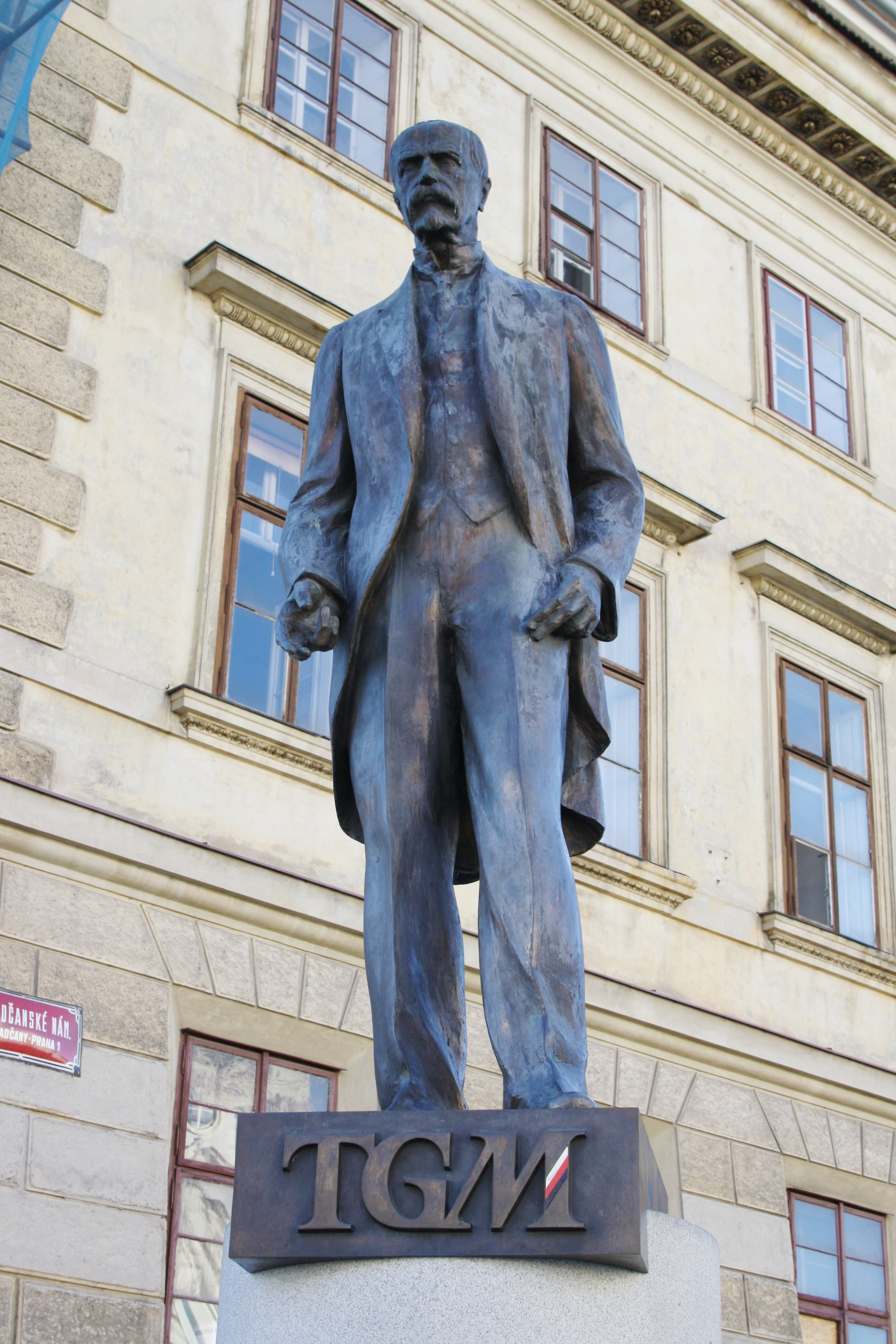
Statue of Tomáš Garrigue Masaryk near Prague Castle

==== First Czechoslovak Republic ====
World War I ended with the defeat of the Austro-Hungarian Empire and the creation of Czechoslovakia. Prague was chosen as its capital and Prague Castle as the seat of the president Tomáš Garrigue Masaryk. At this time, Prague was a true European capital with a highly developed industry. By 1930, the population had risen to 850,000.

==== Second World War ====
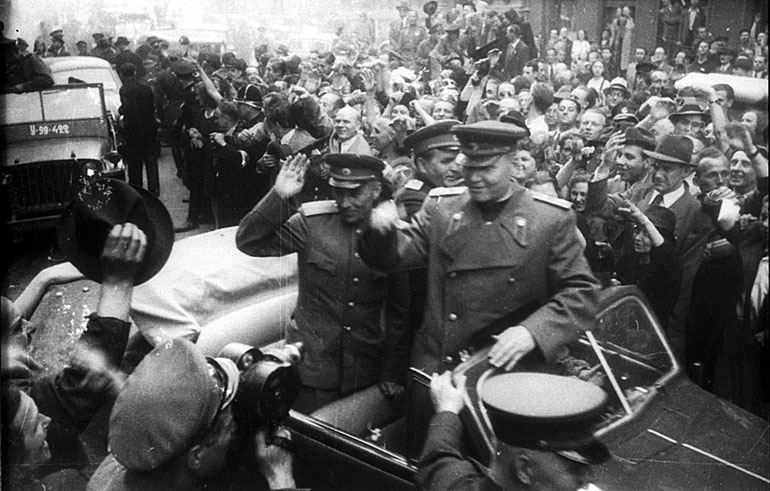
The Red Army enters Prague in May 1945.

Hitler ordered the German Army to enter Prague on 15 March 1939, and from Prague Castle proclaimed Bohemia and Moravia a German protectorate. For most of its history, Prague had been a multi-ethnic city with important Czech, German and (mostly native German-speaking) Jewish populations. From 1939, when the country was occupied by Nazi Germany, Hitler took over Prague Castle. During the Second World War, most Jews were deported and killed by the Germans. In 1942, Prague was witness to the assassination of one of the most powerful men in Nazi Germany—Reinhard Heydrich—during Operation Anthropoid, accomplished by Czechoslovak national heroes Jozef Gabčík and Jan Kubiš. Hitler ordered bloody reprisals.

In February 1945, Prague suffered several bombing raids by the US Army Air Forces. 701 people were killed, more than 1,000 people were injured and some buildings, factories and historic landmarks (Emmaus Monastery, Faust House, Vinohrady Synagogue) were destroyed. Many historic structures in Prague, however, escaped the destruction of the war and the damage was small compared to the destruction of many other cities in that time. According to American pilots, it was the result of a navigational mistake. In March, a deliberate raid targeted military factories in Prague, killing about 370 people.

On 5 May 1945, two days before Germany capitulated, an uprising against Germany occurred. Several thousand Czechs were killed in four days of bloody street fighting, with many atrocities committed by both sides. Fought concurrently with the Prague uprising, the Prague offensive significantly helped the liberation of Czechoslovakia. At daybreak on 9 May, the 3rd Shock Army of the Red Army took the capital city almost unopposed. The majority (about 50,000 people) of the German population of Prague either fled or were expelled by the Beneš decrees in the aftermath of the war.

==== Cold War ====
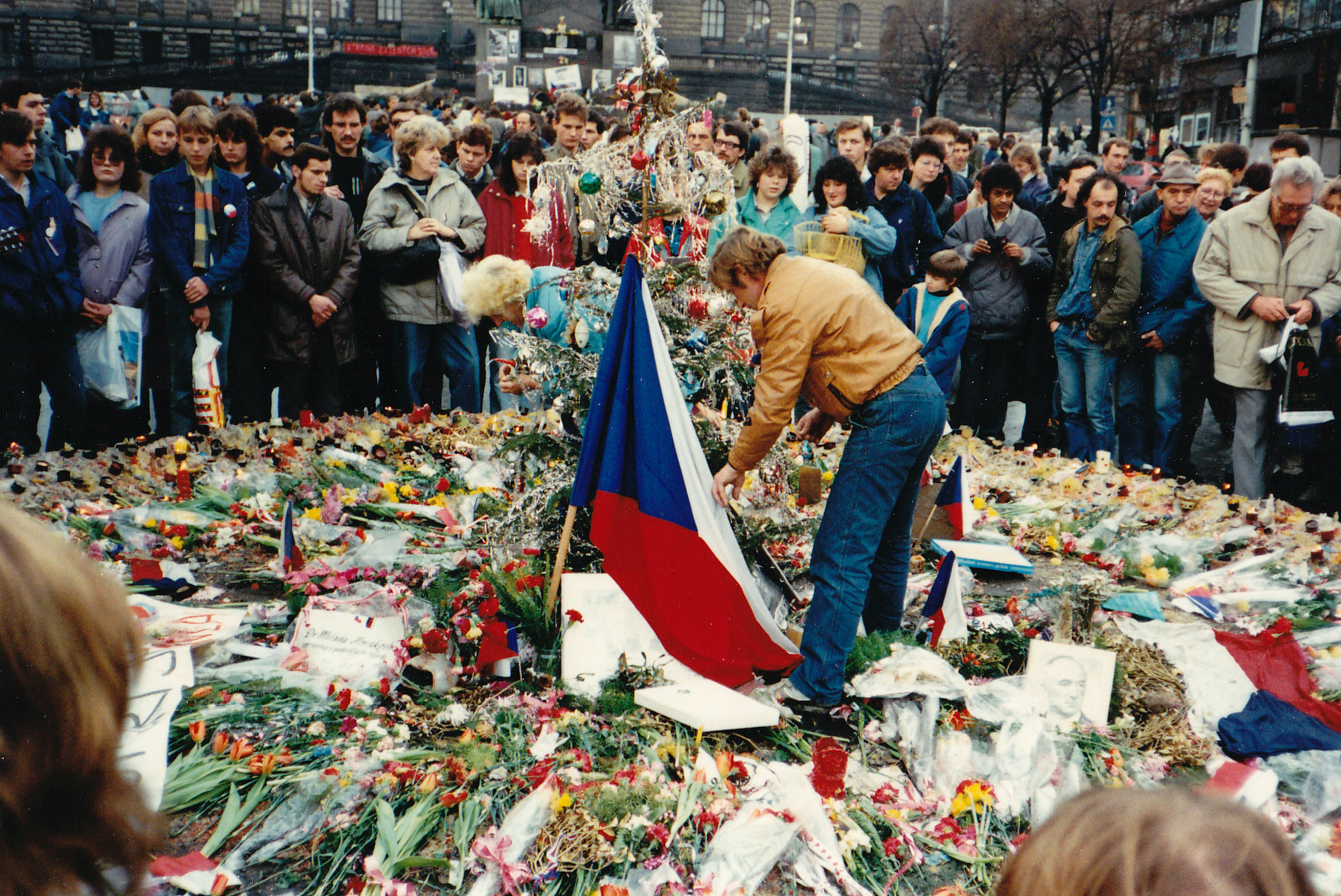
Velvet Revolution in November 1989

Prague was a city in a country under the military, economic, and political control of the Soviet Union (see Iron Curtain and COMECON). The world's largest Stalin Monument was unveiled on Letná hill in 1955 and destroyed in 1962. The 4th Czechoslovak Writers' Congress, held in the city in June 1967, took a strong position against the regime. On 31 October 1967 students demonstrated at Strahov. This spurred the new secretary of the Czechoslovak Communist Party, Alexander Dubček, to proclaim a new deal in his city's and country's life, starting the short-lived season of the "socialism with a human face". It was the Prague Spring, which aimed at the renovation of political institutions in a democratic way. The other Warsaw Pact member countries, except Romania and Albania, were led by the Soviet Union to repress these reforms through the invasion of Czechoslovakia and the capital, Prague, on 21 August 1968. The invasion, chiefly by infantry and tanks, effectively suppressed any further attempts at reform. The military occupation of Czechoslovakia by the Red Army would end only in 1991. Jan Palach and Jan Zajíc committed suicide by self-immolation in January and February 1969 to protest against the "normalisation" of the country.

=== After the Velvet Revolution ===
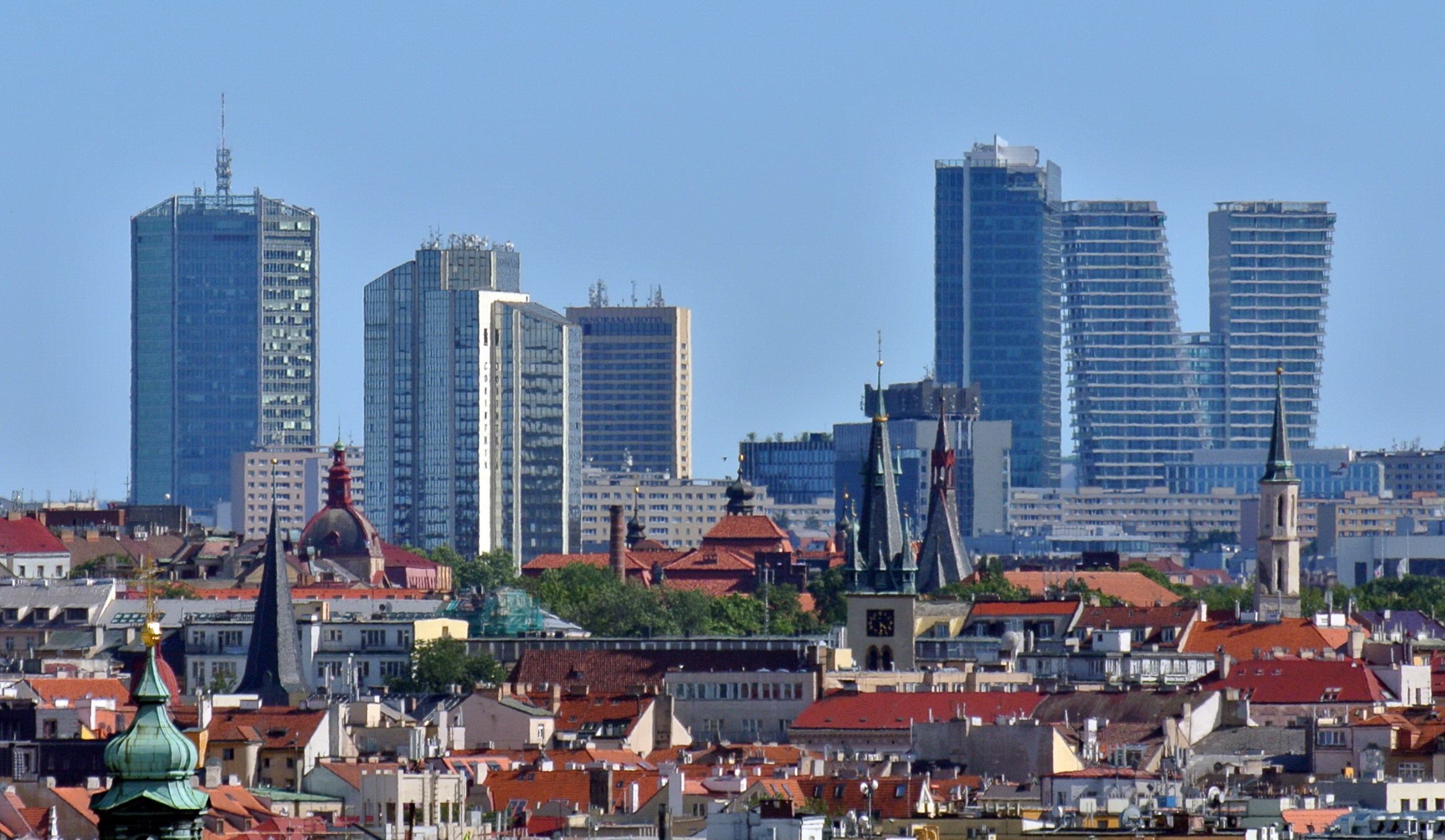
Prague high-rise buildings at Pankrác

In 1989, after riot police beat back a peaceful student demonstration, the Velvet Revolution crowded the streets of Prague, and the capital of Czechoslovakia benefited greatly from the new mood. In 1992, the Historic Centre of Prague and its monuments were inscribed as a cultural UNESCO World Heritage Site. In 1993, after the Velvet Divorce, Prague became the capital city of the new Czech Republic. Since the 1990s, high-rise buildings have been built in Prague in large quantities. In the late 1990s, Prague again became an important cultural centre of Europe and was notably influenced by globalisation. In 2000, the IMF and World Bank summits took place in Prague and anti-globalisation riots took place here. In 2002, Prague suffered from widespread floods that damaged buildings and its underground transport system.

In 2012, Prague's main airport, Prague Ruzyně International Airport was renamed Václav Havel Airport, in honour of the Czech Republic's former first president Václav Havel, who died previously in late 2011.

Prague launched a bid for the 2016 Summer Olympics, but failed to make the candidate city shortlist. In June 2009, as the result of financial pressures from the global recession, Prague's officials chose to cancel the city's planned bid for the 2020 Summer Olympics.

On 21 December 2023, a mass shooting took place at Charles University in central Prague. Fifteen people were killed and 25 were injured. It was the deadliest mass murder in the history of the Czech Republic.

== Geography ==
Prague is situated on the Vltava River. The Berounka flows into the Vltava in the suburbs of Lahovice. There are 99 watercourses in Prague with a total length of 360 km (220 mi). The longest streams are Rokytka and Botič.

There are 4 reservoirs, 47 fishponds, 33 retention reservoirs, and dry polders in the city. The largest pond is Velký Počernický rybník with 41.76 ha (103.2 acres). The largest body of water is Hostivař Reservoir with 42 hectares (103.8 acres).

In terms of geomorphological division, most of Prague is located in the Prague Plateau. In the south, the city's territory extends into the Hořovice Uplands, in the north it extends into the Central Elbe Table lowland. The highest point is the top of the hill Teleček on the western border of Prague, at 399 m (1,309 ft) above sea level. Notable hills in the centre of Prague are Petřín with 327 m (1,073 ft) and Vítkov with 270 m (890 ft). The lowest point is the Vltava in Suchdol at the place where it leaves the city, at 172 m (564 ft).

Prague is located approximately at 50°5′N 14°25′E. Prague is approximately at the same latitude as Frankfurt, Germany; Paris, France; and Vancouver, Canada. The northernmost point is at 50°10′39″N 14°31′37″E, the southernmost point is at 49°56′31″N 14°23′44″E, the westernmost point is at 50°6′14″N 14°13′31″E, and the easternmost point is at 50°5′14″N 14°42′23″E. Farthest geographical points of the city territory are marked physically by so-called Prague Poles.

=== Climate ===
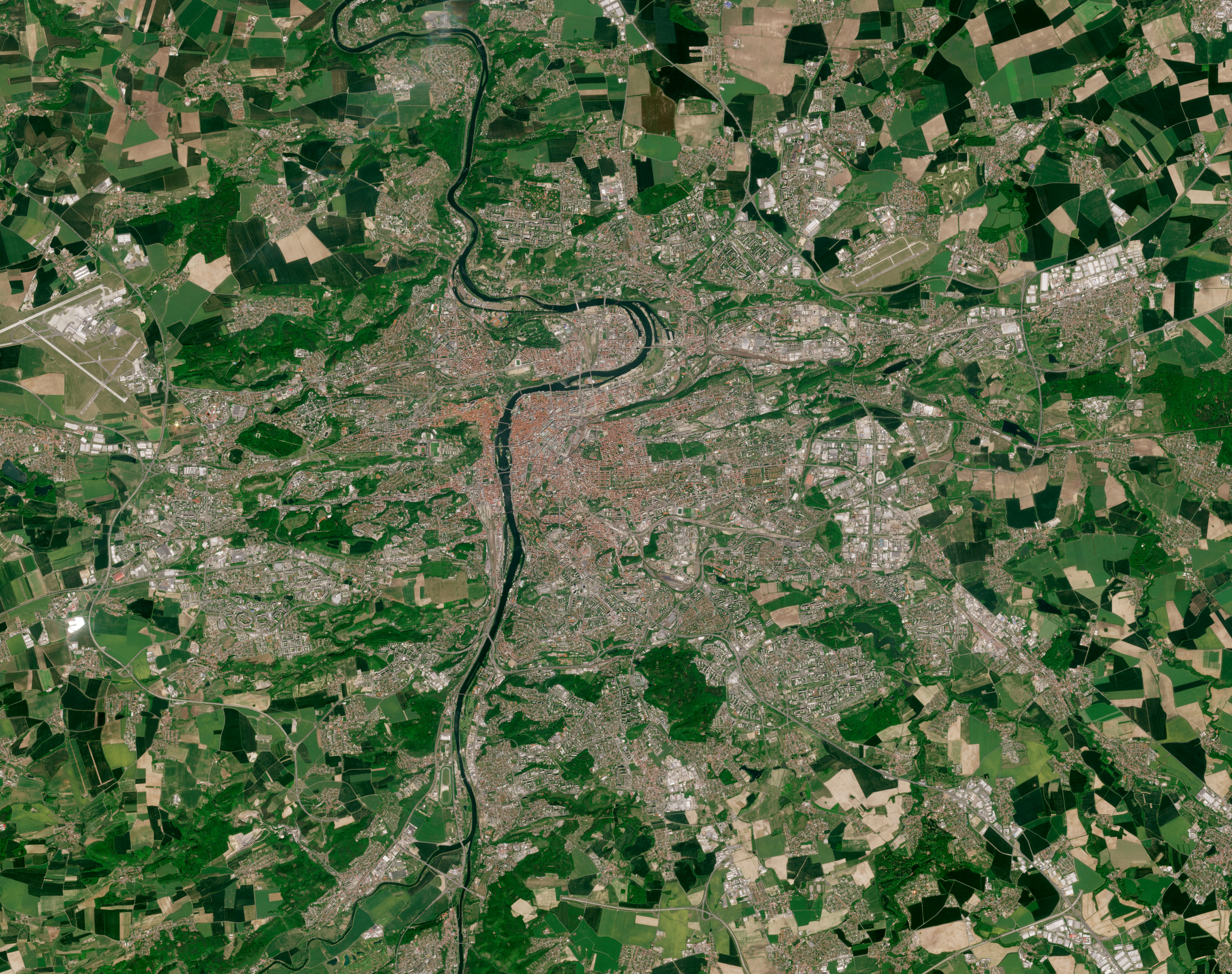
Prague seen from satellite

Prague has an oceanic climate (Köppen: Cfb; Trewartha: Dobk) bordering on a humid continental climate (Dfb), defined as such by the 0 °C (32 °F) isotherm. The winters are relatively cold with average temperatures at about freezing point (0 °C), and with very little sunshine. Snow cover can be common between mid-November and late March, although snow accumulations of more than 200 mm (8 in) are infrequent. There are also a few periods of mild temperatures in winter. Summers usually bring plenty of sunshine and temperatures around 25 °C (77 °F), but there has been a considerable increase in days with over 30 °C (86 °F) in later years. Nights can be quite cool even in summer, though. Precipitation in Prague is low by Czech standards (about 500 mm per year) since it is located in the rain shadow of the Sudetes and other mountain ranges. The driest season is usually winter, while late spring and summer can bring quite heavy rain, especially in the form of thundershowers. The number of hours of average sunshine has increased over time. Temperature inversions are relatively common between mid-October and mid-March, bringing foggy, cold days and sometimes moderate air pollution. Prague is also a windy city with common sustained western winds and an average wind speed of 16 km/h (10 mph) that often helps break temperature inversions and clear the air in cold months.

Climate data for Clementinum, Prague WMO ID: 11515; 1991–2020 normals, extremes 1775–present
Month	Jan	Feb	Mar	Apr	May	Jun	Jul	Aug	Sep	Oct	Nov	Dec	Year
Record high °C (°F)	17.4 (63.3)	18.5 (65.3)	22.9 (73.2)	30.7 (87.3)	32.8 (91.0)	39.0 (102.2)	37.8 (100.0)	36.8 (98.2)	33.1 (91.6)	27.8 (82.0)	19.5 (67.1)	17.7 (63.9)	39.0 (102.2)
Mean daily maximum °C (°F)	3.9 (39.0)	5.6 (42.1)	10.0 (50.0)	16.1 (61.0)	20.9 (69.6)	24.4 (75.9)	26.5 (79.7)	25.9 (78.6)	20.4 (68.7)	14.4 (57.9)	8.5 (47.3)	4.8 (40.6)	15.1 (59.2)
Daily mean °C (°F)	1.8 (35.2)	2.9 (37.2)	6.5 (43.7)	11.7 (53.1)	16.2 (61.2)	19.7 (67.5)	21.6 (70.9)	21.1 (70.0)	16.2 (61.2)	11.0 (51.8)	6.3 (43.3)	2.8 (37.0)	11.5 (52.7)
Mean daily minimum °C (°F)	−0.5 (31.1)	0.0 (32.0)	2.9 (37.2)	6.9 (44.4)	11.3 (52.3)	14.8 (58.6)	16.6 (61.9)	16.3 (61.3)	12.2 (54.0)	7.9 (46.2)	3.9 (39.0)	0.6 (33.1)	7.7 (45.9)
Record low °C (°F)	−27.5 (−17.5)	−27.1 (−16.8)	−27.6 (−17.7)	−8.0 (17.6)	−1.6 (29.1)	3.6 (38.5)	7.8 (46.0)	6.4 (43.5)	0.7 (33.3)	−7.5 (18.5)	−16.9 (1.6)	−24.8 (−12.6)	−27.6 (−17.7)
Average precipitation mm (inches)	18.1 (0.71)	16.2 (0.64)	26.3 (1.04)	24.7 (0.97)	58.1 (2.29)	68.6 (2.70)	67.4 (2.65)	61.9 (2.44)	33.9 (1.33)	29.8 (1.17)	26.2 (1.03)	22.6 (0.89)	453.9 (17.87)
Average snowfall cm (inches)	5.8 (2.3)	4.2 (1.7)	1.6 (0.6)	0.0 (0.0)	0.0 (0.0)	0.0 (0.0)	0.0 (0.0)	0.0 (0.0)	0.0 (0.0)	0.0 (0.0)	0.8 (0.3)	3.6 (1.4)	16.1 (6.3)
Average relative humidity (%)	76.2	71.2	65.9	58.7	58.9	59.3	58.7	60.5	67.7	73.5	77.4	76.7	67.1
Mean monthly sunshine hours	52.4	81.9	129.3	187.8	216.3	218.4	229.1	224.1	168.2	110.8	52.5	46.2	1,716.9
Source: Czech Hydrometeorological Institute

== Administration and politics ==
=== Administrative division ===
Map of Prague cadastral areas and administrative districts

Prague is the capital of the Czech Republic and, as such, is the regular seat of its central authorities. Since 24 November 1990, it is de facto again a statutory city, but has a specific status of the municipality and the region at the same time. Prague also houses the administrative institutions of the Central Bohemian Region.

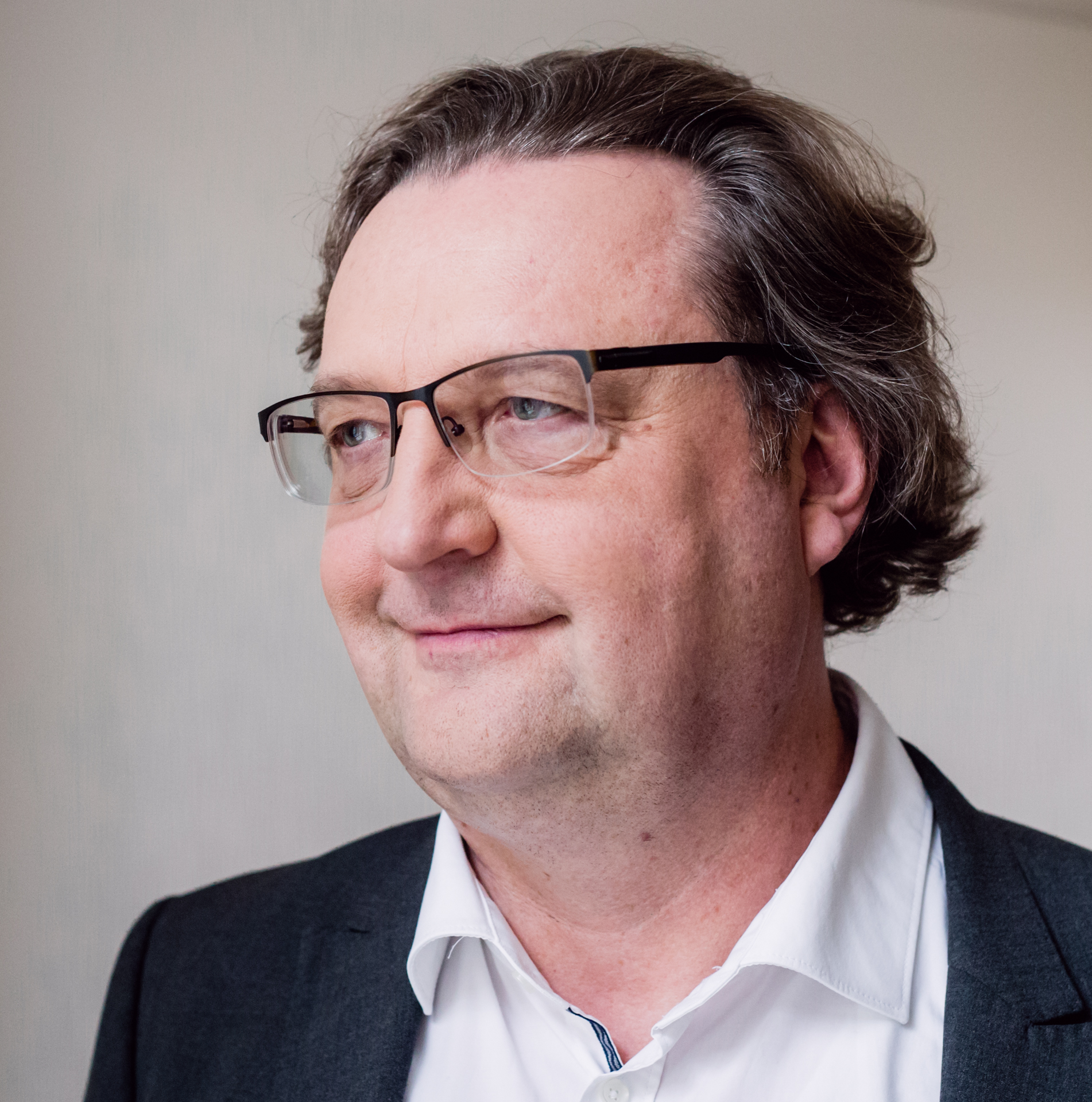
Mayor Petr Hlaváček

Until 1949, all administrative districts of Prague were formed by the whole one or more cadastral units, municipalities, or towns. Since 1949, there has been a fundamental change in the administrative division. Since then, the boundaries of many urban districts, administrative districts, and city districts are independent of the boundaries of cadastral territories, and some cadastral territories are thus divided into administrative and self-governing parts of the city. Cadastral area (for example, Vinohrady and Smíchov) are still relevant, especially for the registration of land and real estate and house numbering.

Prague is divided into 10 municipal districts (1–10), 22 administrative districts (1–22), 57 municipal parts, and 112 cadastral areas.

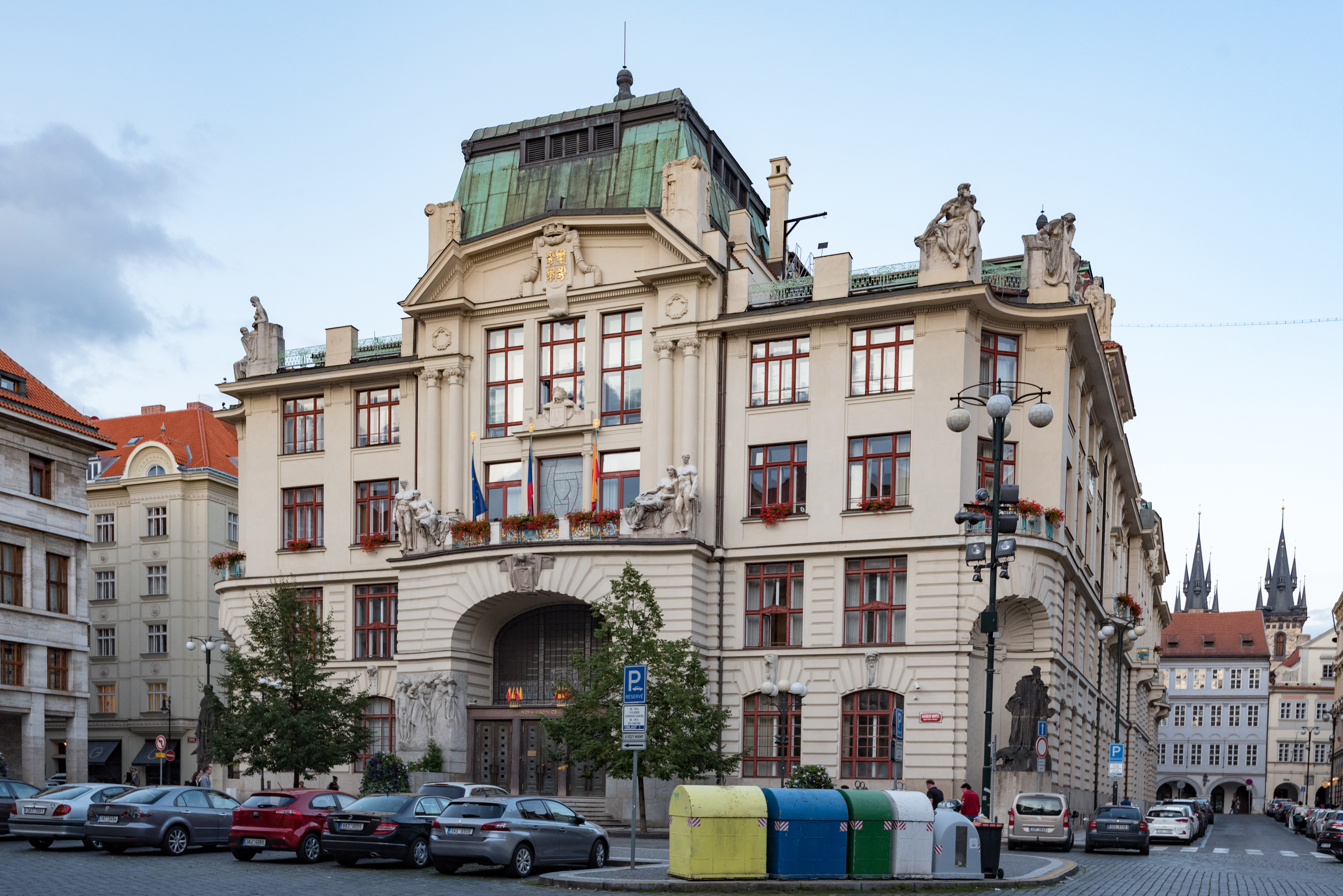
Prague New City Hall

=== City government ===
Prague is administered by the autonomous Prague City Assembly, which consists of 65 members and is elected through municipal elections. As of Nov. 19, 17 members of the council were from the Mayors and Independents (centre to centre-right), which governs the city in conjunction with 17 members of the centre-right Spolu for Prague and 13 members of Prague Together (centre). Thus, the governing coalition has a comfortable majority in the assembly with 47 of 65 seats. Opposition parties include ANO 2011 (right-wing populist) with 11 members, and the Czech Pirate Party (centre to centre-left) with 7 members.

The executive body of Prague, elected by the Assembly, is Prague City Council. The municipal office of Prague is at Prague City Hall and has 11 members, including the mayor. It prepares proposals for the Assembly meetings and ensures that adopted resolutions are fulfilled. The Mayor of Prague is STAN member Petr Hlaváček.

=== National politics ===
==== 2025 ====
Region	ANO	Spolu	STAN	Pirates	SPD	AUTO	Stačilo!	Others	Turnout
Prague	19.83	33.97	13.40	16.89	5.23	5.15	2.75	2.66	71.44
Czech Republic	34.52	23.36	11.23	8.97	7.78	6.77	4.31	3.06	68.95
Source: Volby

==== 2021 ====
% of votes
Region	SPOLU	ANO	PirStan	SPD	Přísaha	ČSSD	KSČM	Others	Turnout
Prague	40.0	17.5	22.6	4.6	3.4	4.0	2.1	5.8	70.2
Czech Republic	27.8	27.1	15.6	9.6	4.7	4.7	3.6	6.9	65.4

== Demographics ==
Prague population pyramid in 2021

=== 2011 census ===
Even though the official population of Prague hovers around 1.3 million as of the 2011 census, the city's real population is much higher due to only 65% of its residents having registered in the city. Data taken from mobile phone movements around the city suggest that the real population of Prague is closer to 1.9 or 2.0 million, with an additional 300,000 to 400,000 commuters coming to the city on weekdays for work, education, or commerce.

About 14% of the city's residents were born outside the Czech Republic, the highest ratio anywhere in the country. However, 64.8% of the city's population self-identified as ethnically Czech, which is slightly higher than the national average of 63.7%. Almost 29% of respondents declined to answer the question on ethnicity at all, so it may be assumed that the real percentage of ethnic Czechs in Prague is considerably higher. The largest ethnic minority are Slovaks, followed by Ukrainians and Russians.

Prague's population is the oldest and best-educated in the country. It has the lowest proportion of children. Only 10.8% of census respondents claimed adherence to a religion; the majority of these were Roman Catholics.

=== Historical population ===
Development of the Prague population since 1378 (since 1869 according to the censuses within the limits of present-day Prague):

Historical population

Year	Pop.	±%
1250	4,000	—
1300	10,000	+150.0%
1378	40,000	+300.0%
1500	25,000	−37.5%
1610	60,000	+140.0%
1798	79,000	+31.7%
1869	270,389	+242.3%

Year	Pop.	±%
1880	349,574	+29.3%
1890	437,373	+25.1%
1900	559,433	+27.9%
1910	667,664	+19.3%
1920	729,820	+9.3%
1930	950,465	+30.2%
1950	1,057,570	+11.3%

Year	Pop.	±%
1961	1,133,056	+7.1%
1970	1,140,795	+0.7%
1980	1,182,186	+3.6%
1991	1,214,174	+2.7%
2001	1,169,106	−3.7%
2011	1,268,796	+8.5%
2021	1,301,432	+2.6%

=== Foreign residents ===
As of 30 September 2026, there were 373,570 foreign residents in Prague, of whom 143,295 had permanent residence in Prague. The following nationalities are the most numerous:

Foreign residents in Prague (September 2026)
Nationality	Population
Ukraine	177,197
Slovakia	34,556
Russia	23,722
Vietnam	16,383
Other countries/territories: United States / 7,617; Kazakhstan / 6,899; India / 6,860; Mainland China / 6,511; Romania / 6,117; Bulgaria / 4,928; United Kingdom / 4,185; Italy / 3,991; Turkey / 3,979; Hungary / 3,817; Poland / 3,507; Germany / 3,507; Philippines / 3,092; Belarus / 2,981; Uzbekistan / 2,914; France / 2,911; Serbia / 2,117; Moldova / 2,027; Croatia / 1,789; Azerbaijan / 1,720; South Korea / 1,639; Spain / 1,561; Armenia / 1,545; Japan / 1,338; Georgia / 1,314; Israel / 1,291; Mongolia / 1,135; North Macedonia / 1,088; Kyrgyzstan / 1,045; Greece / 1,038; Bosnia and Herzegovina / 1,023

== Culture ==
Historic Centre of Prague
UNESCO World Heritage Site
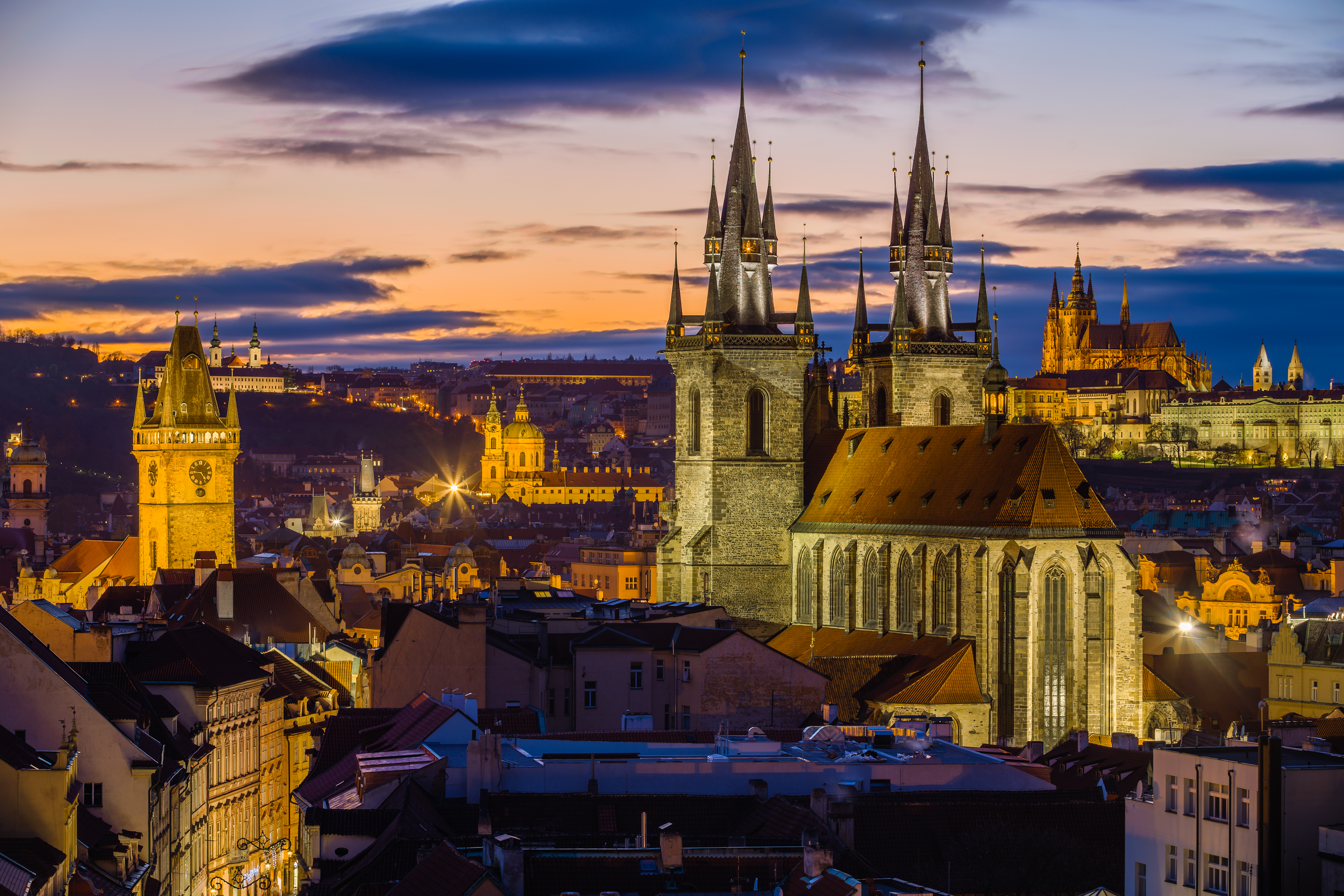
- Interactive map of Historic Centre of Prague
- Includes: Historic Centre of Prague and Průhonice Park
- Criteria: Cultural: ii, iv, vi
- Reference: 616
- Inscription: 1992 (16th Session)
- Area: 1,106.36 ha (2,733.9 acres)
- Buffer zone: 9,887.09 ha (24,431.5 acres)

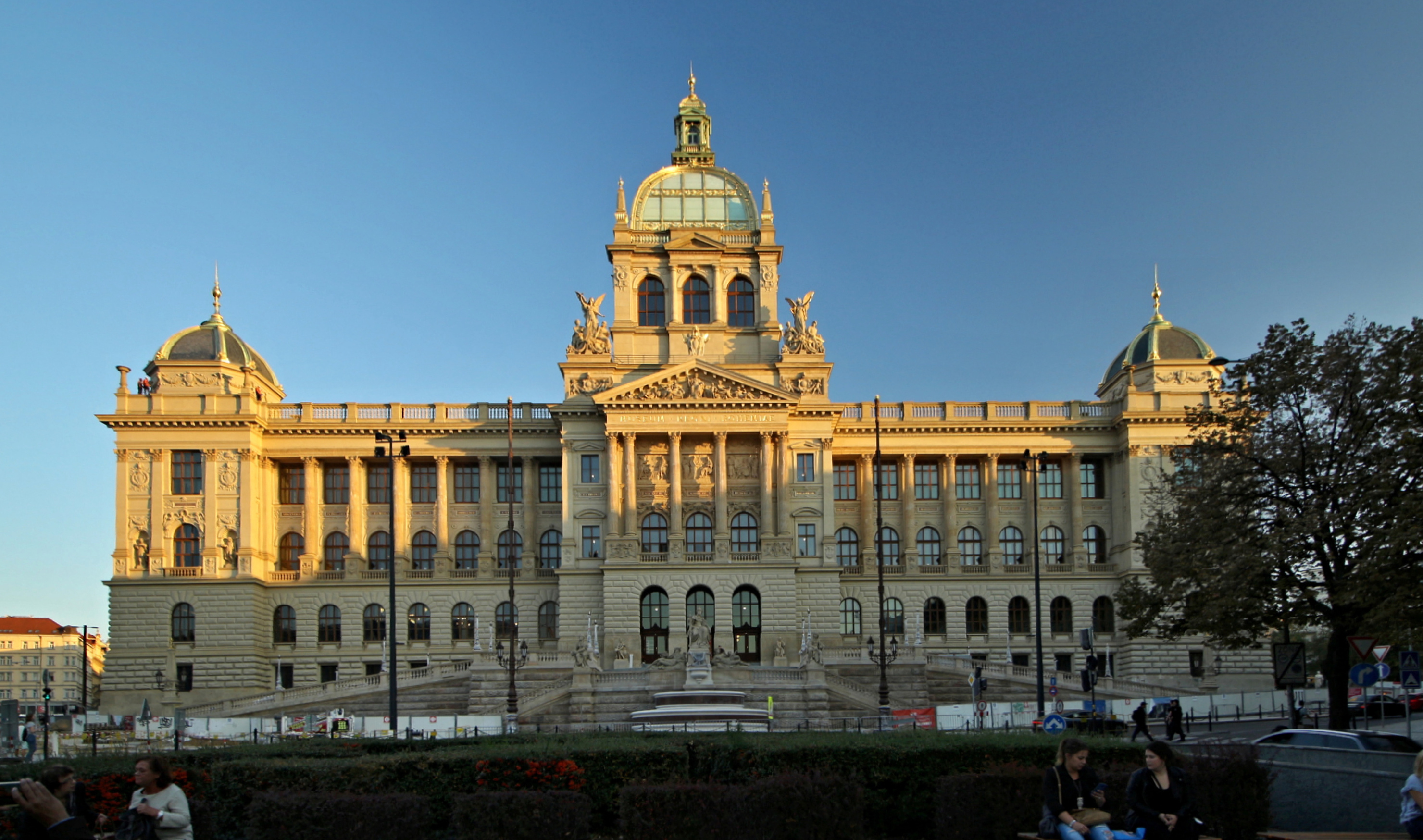
National Museum is a dominant landmark of the Wenceslas Square.

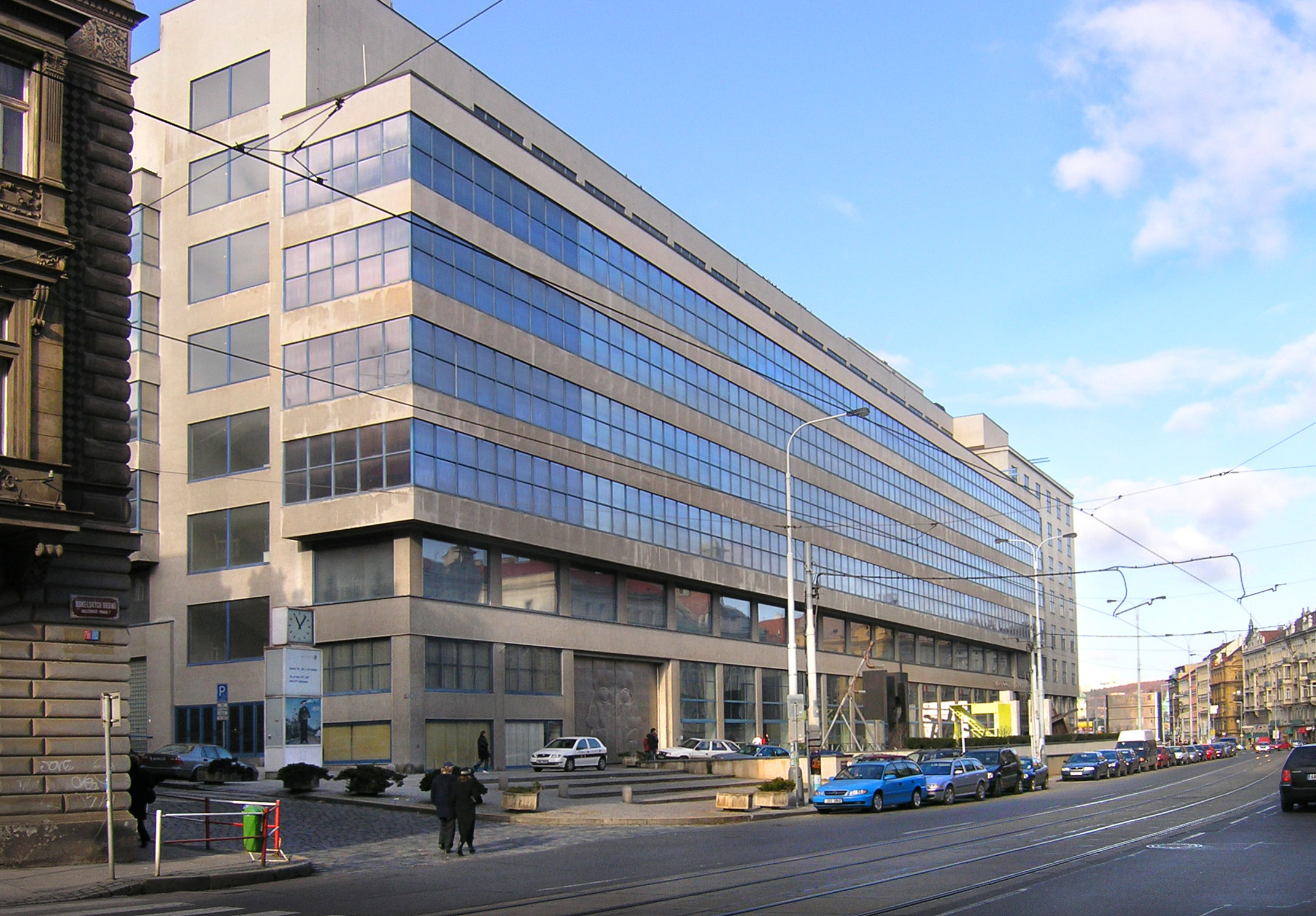
Veletržní palác houses the largest collection of National Gallery art.

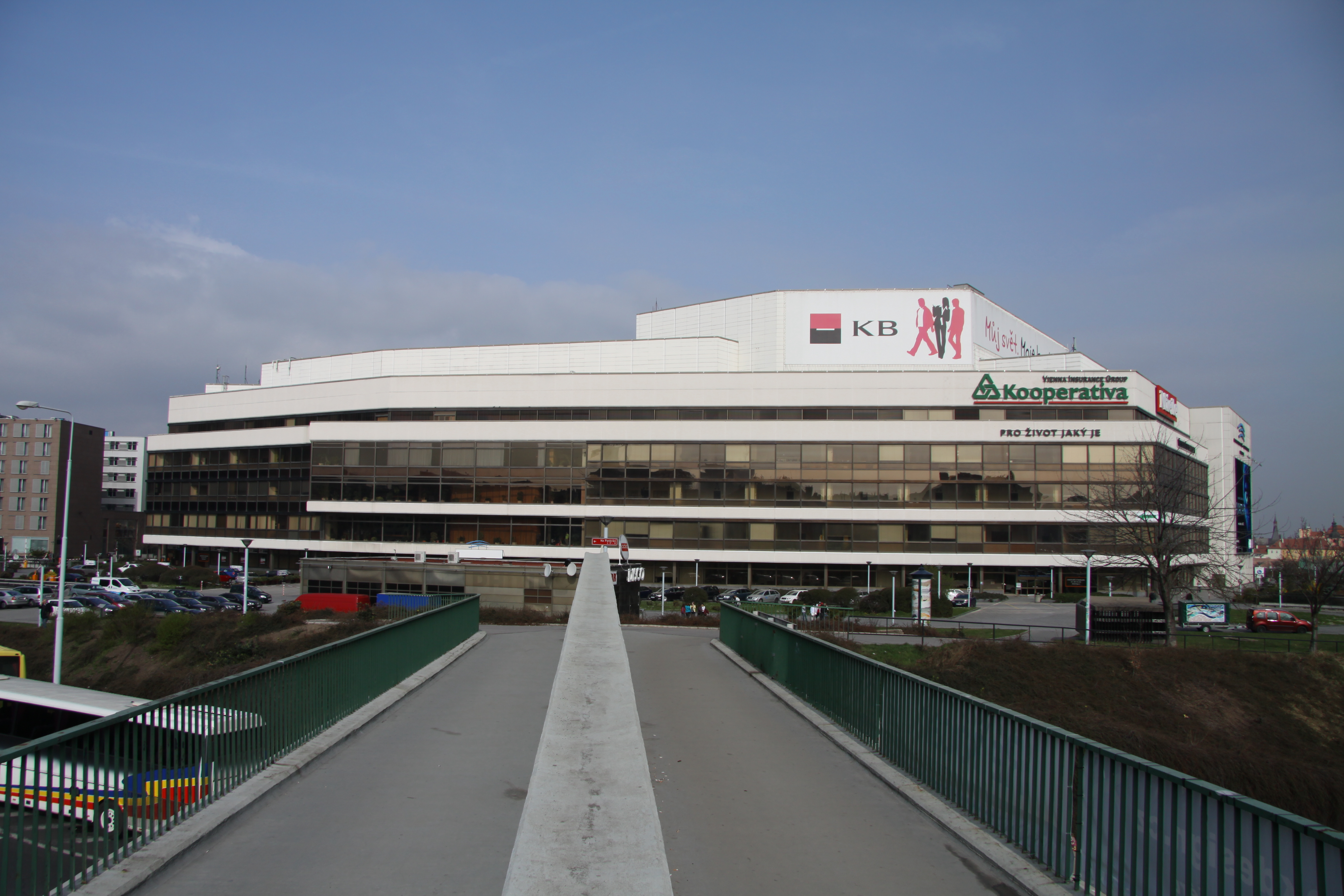
Prague Congress Centre has hosted the IMF-WBG meeting and NATO summit.

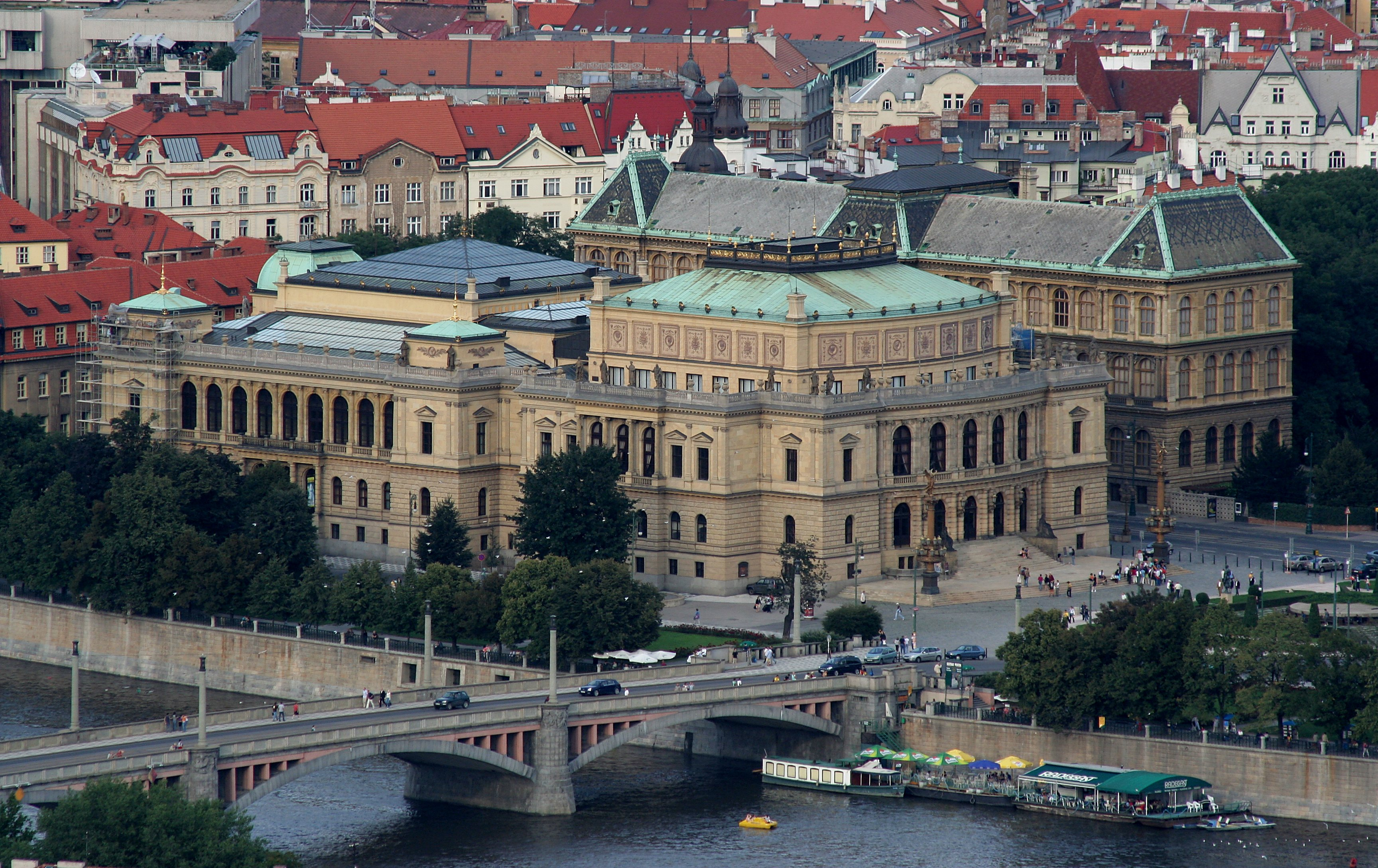
Rudolfinum, a concert and exhibition hall

The city is traditionally one of the cultural centres of Europe, hosting many cultural events. Some of the significant cultural institutions include the National Theatre (Národní Divadlo) and the Estates Theatre (Stavovské or Tylovo or Nosticovo divadlo), where the premières of Mozart's Don Giovanni and La clemenza di Tito were held. Other major cultural institutions are the Rudolfinum, which is home to the Czech Philharmonic Orchestra, and the Municipal House, which is home to the Prague Symphony Orchestra. The Prague State Opera (Státní opera) performs at the Smetana Theatre.

The city has many world-class museums, including the National Museum (Národní muzeum), the Museum of Prague (Muzeum Prahy), the Jewish Museum in Prague, the Alfons Mucha Museum, the National Technical Museum, the African-Prague Museum, the Museum of Decorative Arts in Prague, the Náprstek Museum (Náprstkovo muzeum), the Josef Sudek Gallery and The Josef Sudek Studio, the National Library, the National Gallery, which manages the largest collection of art in the Czech Republic and the Kunsthalle Praha, the newest museum in the city.

There are hundreds of concert halls, galleries, cinemas, and music clubs in the city. It hosts music festivals including the Prague Spring International Music Festival, the Prague Autumn International Music Festival, the Prague International Organ Festival, the Dvořák Prague International Music Festival, and the Prague International Jazz Festival. Film festivals include Bohemia Film Awards, the Febiofest, the One World Film Festival, and Echoes of the Karlovy Vary International Film Festival. The city also hosts the Prague Writers' Festival, the Prague Folklore Days, Prague Advent Choral Meeting the Summer Shakespeare Festival, the Prague Fringe Festival, the World Roma Festival, as well as the hundreds of Vernissages and fashion shows.

With the growth of low-cost airlines in Europe, Prague has become a weekend city destination, allowing tourists to visit its museums and cultural sites as well as try its Czech beers and cuisine.

The city has many buildings by renowned architects, including Adolf Loos (Villa Müller), Frank O. Gehry (Dancing House) and Jean Nouvel (Golden Angel).

Recent major events held in Prague:

- International Monetary Fund and World Bank Summit 2000
- NATO Summit 2002
- International Olympic Committee Session 2004
- IAU General Assembly 2006 (Definition of planet)
- EU & USA Summit 2009
- Czech Presidency of the Council of the European Union 2009
- USA & Russia Summit 2010 (signing of the New START treaty)

=== In popular culture ===
The early 1912 silent drama film Pro peníze was filmed mostly in Prague. Many films have been made afterwards at Barrandov Studios and at Prague Studios. Hollywood films produced in Prague include Mission Impossible, Dungeons and Dragons, xXx, Blade II, Children of Dune, Alien vs. Predator, Doom, Chronicles of Narnia, Hellboy, EuroTrip, Van Helsing, Red Tails, and Spider-Man: Far From Home. Many Indian films have also been filmed in the city including Yuvvraaj, Drona, Rockstar, Jab Harry Met Sejal, Bang Bang, and Duplicate.

Among the most famous foreign music videos filmed in Prague are: Never Tear Us Apart by INXS, Some Things by Lasgo, Silver and Cold by AFI, Diamonds from Sierra Leone by Kanye West, Don't Stop the Music by Rihanna and Numb by Linkin Park.

Video games set in Prague include Osman, Vampire: The Masquerade – Redemption, Soldier of Fortune II: Double Helix, Tomb Raider: The Angel of Darkness, Indiana Jones and the Emperor's Tomb, Broken Sword: The Sleeping Dragon, Still Life, Metal Gear Solid 4, Call of Duty: Modern Warfare 3, Forza Motorsport 5, 6 and Deus Ex: Mankind Divided.

Historical fiction novels set in Prague include The Discovery of Witches, Shadows of Night by Deborah Harkness and Dan Brown's The Secret of Secrets.

Due to its large pornography industry, Prague has been nicknamed the "Porn Capital of Europe", a nickname also given to Budapest.

=== Cuisine ===
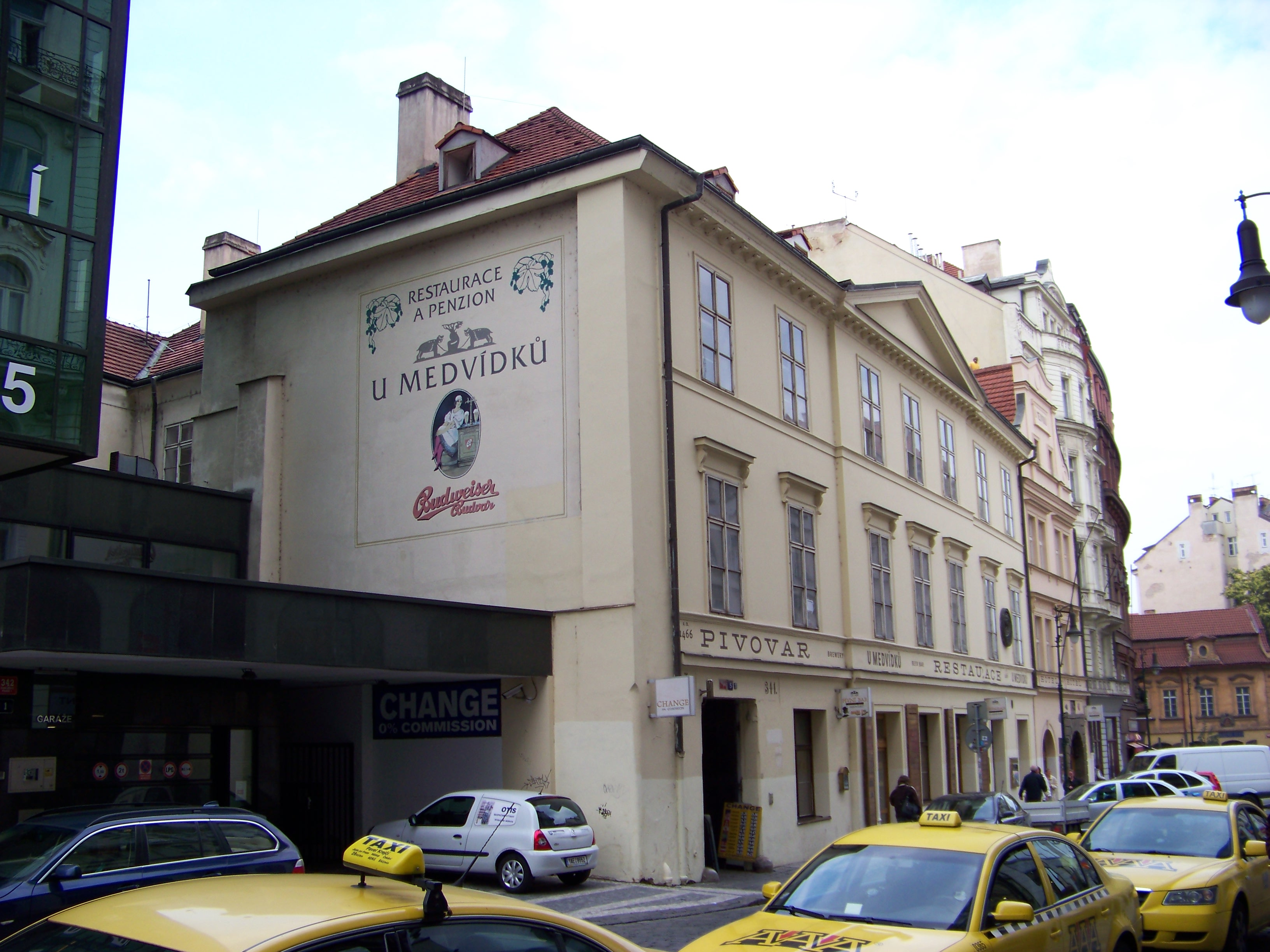
U Medvídků (A.D. 1466), one of the oldest pubs in Europe

In 2008, the Allegro restaurant received the first Michelin star in the whole of the post-Communist part of Central Europe. It retained its star until 2011. As of 2018, there were just two Michelin-starred restaurants in Prague: La Degustation Bohême Bourgeoise and Field. Another six have been awarded Michelin's Bib Gourmand: Bistrøt 104, Divinis, Eska, Maso a Kobliha, Na Kopci, and Sansho.

Czech beer has a long history, with brewing taking place in Břevnov Monastery in 993. In Old Town, Žižkov and Vinohrady there are hundreds of restaurants, bars and pubs, especially with Czech beer. Prague also hosts several microbrewery festivals throughout the year. The city is home to historical breweries Staropramen (Praha 5), U Fleků, U Medvídků, U Tří růží, Strahov Monastery Brewery (Praha 1) and Břevnov Monastery Brewery (Praha 6). Among many microbreweries are: Novoměstský, Pražský most u Valšů, Národní, Boršov, Loď pivovar, U Dobřenských, U Dvou koček, U Supa (Praha 1), Pivovarský dům (Praha 2), Sousedský pivovar Bašta (Praha 4), Suchdolský Jeník, Libocký pivovar (Praha 6), Marina (Praha 7), U Bulovky (Praha 8), Beznoska, Kolčavka (Praha 9), Vinohradský pivovar, Zubatý pes, Malešický mikropivovar (Praha 10), Jihoměstský pivovar (Praha 11), Lužiny (Praha 13), Počernický pivovar (Praha 14) and Hostivar (Praha 15).

Prague ham and Prague cake are dishes typical for Prague. Trdelník, also called "chimney cakes", is a popular dessert in Prague, although it is not a traditional Czech food.

==== Social media ====
In an October 2024 article, Prague was ranked 7th on "Europe's 10 most beautiful cities to visit in autumn". The ranking was done by Travelbag and based on analysing Google search and Instagram hashtags.

== Economy ==
Prague is the Czech Republic's largest regional economy, accounting for 27% of the country's GDP in 2024, equivalent to CZK 2.18 trillion. GDP per capita was 2.1 times the national average and reached 192% of the EU average in purchasing power standards. This also reflects the concentration of economic activity in the largest city and commuting from surrounding regions like Central Bohemia.

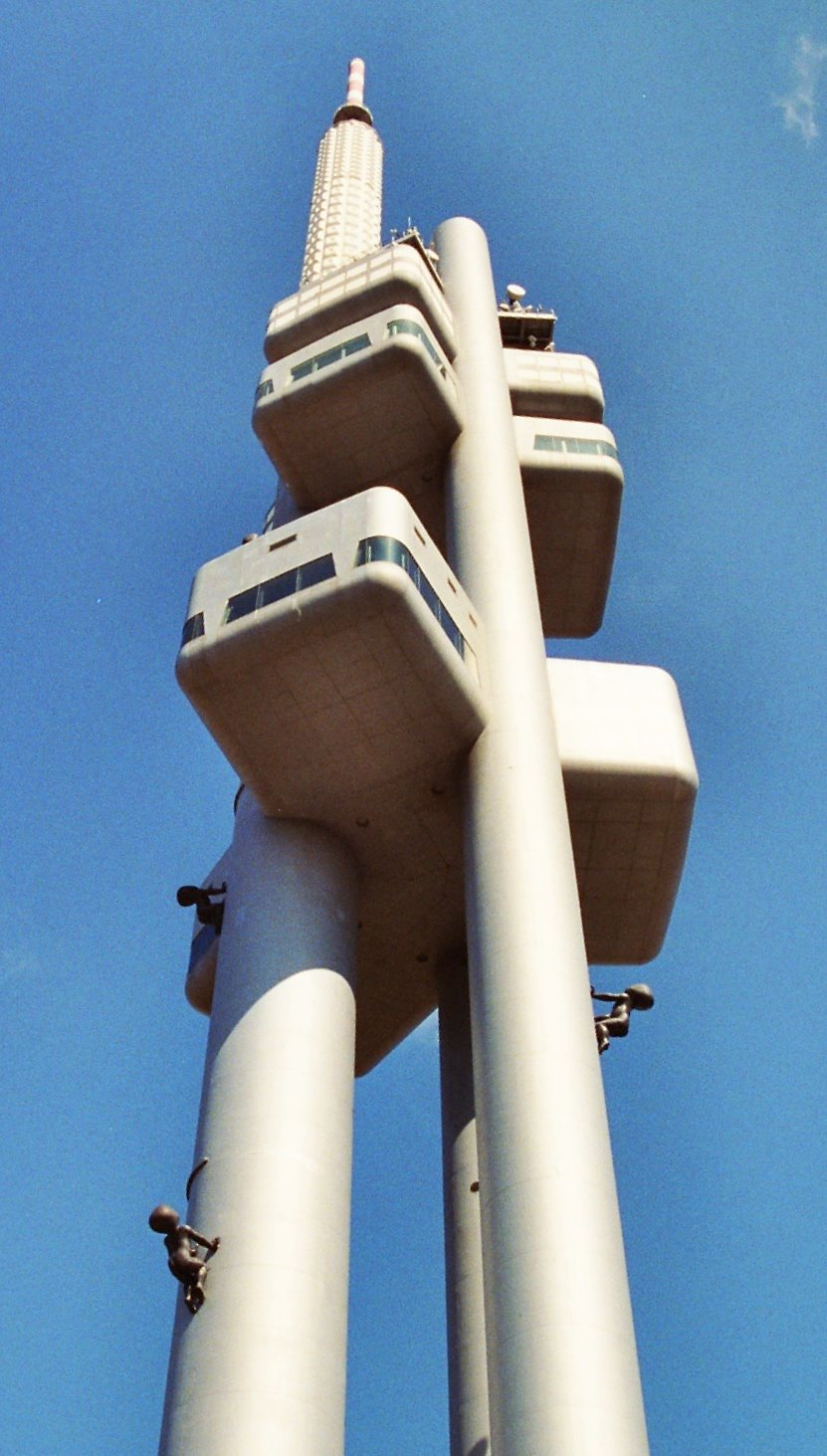
Žižkov Television Tower with crawling "babies"

Since 1989, Prague's economy has shifted from manufacturing towards services. In 2024, services accounted for 83.7% of the city's gross value added. Information technology and communication alone accounted for 16.6%, while manufacturing contributed 6.1%. Prague also accounts for about 30% of the Czech Republic's gross fixed capital formation.

There are over 820,000 employees in Prague on a full-time-equivalent basis, including more than 200,000 commuters. The average gross monthly wage was CZK 62.700 in 2025, approximately 27% above the national average.

The number of (legally registered) foreign residents in Prague has been increasing despite the country's economic downturn. As of March 2010, 148,035 foreign workers were reported to be living in the city, making up about 18 per cent of the workforce, up from 131,132 in 2008. Approximately one-fifth of all investment in the Czech Republic takes place in the city.

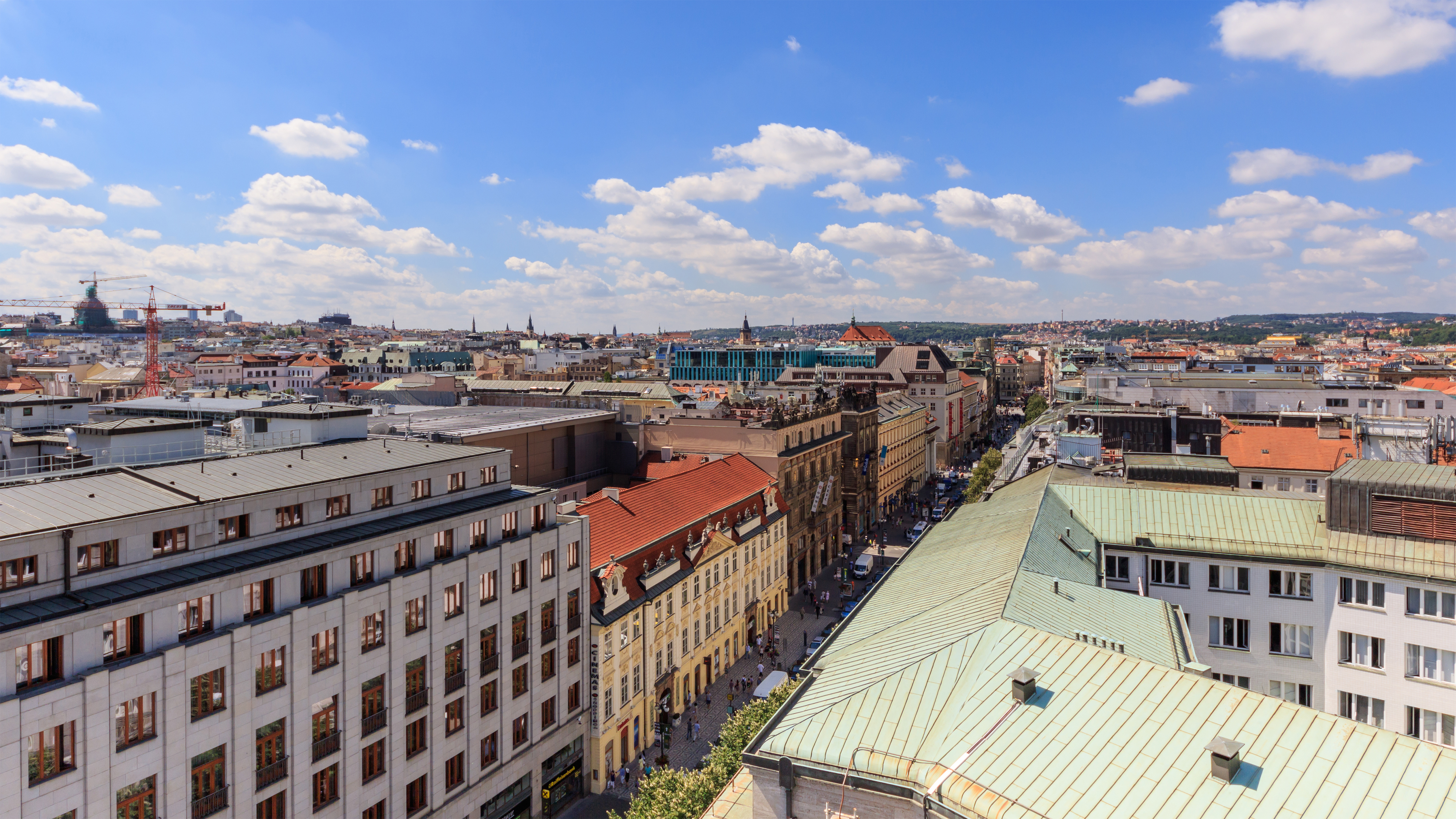
Na příkopě, the most expensive street among the states of V4

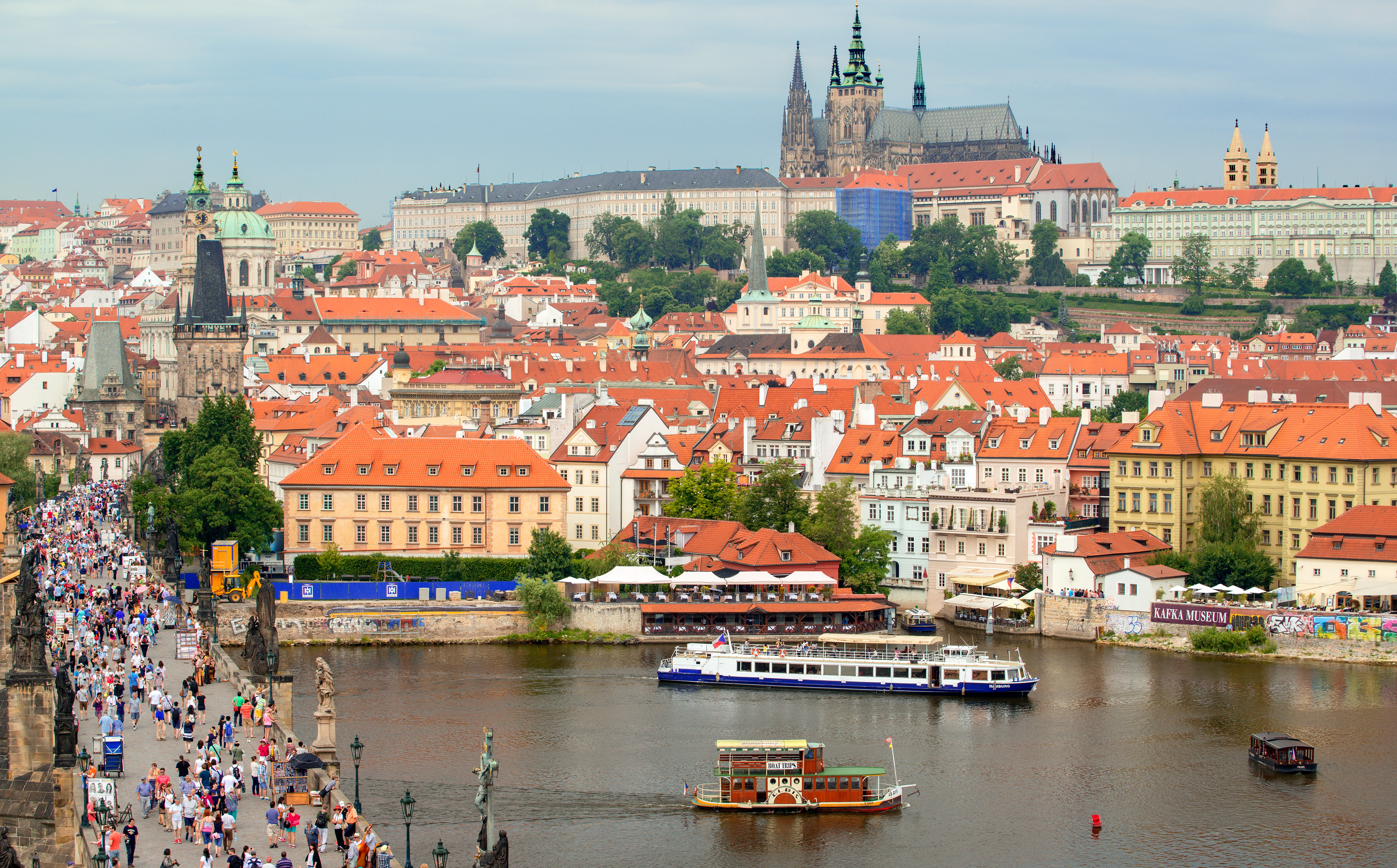
Tourism is a significant part of the city's economy.

Almost one-half of the national income from tourism is spent in Prague. The city offers approximately 73,000 beds in accommodation facilities, most of which were built after 1990, including almost 51,000 beds in hotels and boarding houses.

From the late 1990s to the late 2000s, the city was a common filming location for international productions such as Hollywood and Bollywood motion pictures. A combination of architecture, low costs, and the existing motion picture infrastructure has proven attractive to international film production companies.

The modern economy of Prague is largely service and export-based, and, in a 2010 survey, the city was named the best city in Central and Eastern Europe (CEE) for business.

In 2005, Prague was deemed among the three best cities in Central and Eastern Europe according to The Economist's livability rankings. The city was named as a top-tier nexus city for innovation across multiple sectors of the global innovation economy, placing 29th globally out of 289 cities, ahead of Brussels and Helsinki for innovation in 2010.

Na příkopě is the most expensive street among all the states of the V4. In 2017, with the amount of rent €2,640 (CZK 67,480) per square metre per year, ranked on 22nd place among the most expensive streets in the world. The second most expensive is Pařížská street.

Prague hosts the headquarters of several of the Czech Republic's largest business groups, including EP Group, ČEZ, Agrofert, PPF Group and Czechoslovak Group.

Prague is also the site of some of the most important offices and institutions of the Czech Republic:

- President of the Czech Republic
- The Government and both houses of Parliament
- Ministries and other national offices (Industrial Property Office, Czech Statistical Office, National Security Authority, etc.)
- Czech National Bank
- Czech Television and other major broadcasters
- Radio Free Europe – Radio Liberty
- Galileo global navigation project
- Academy of Sciences of the Czech Republic

== Tourism ==
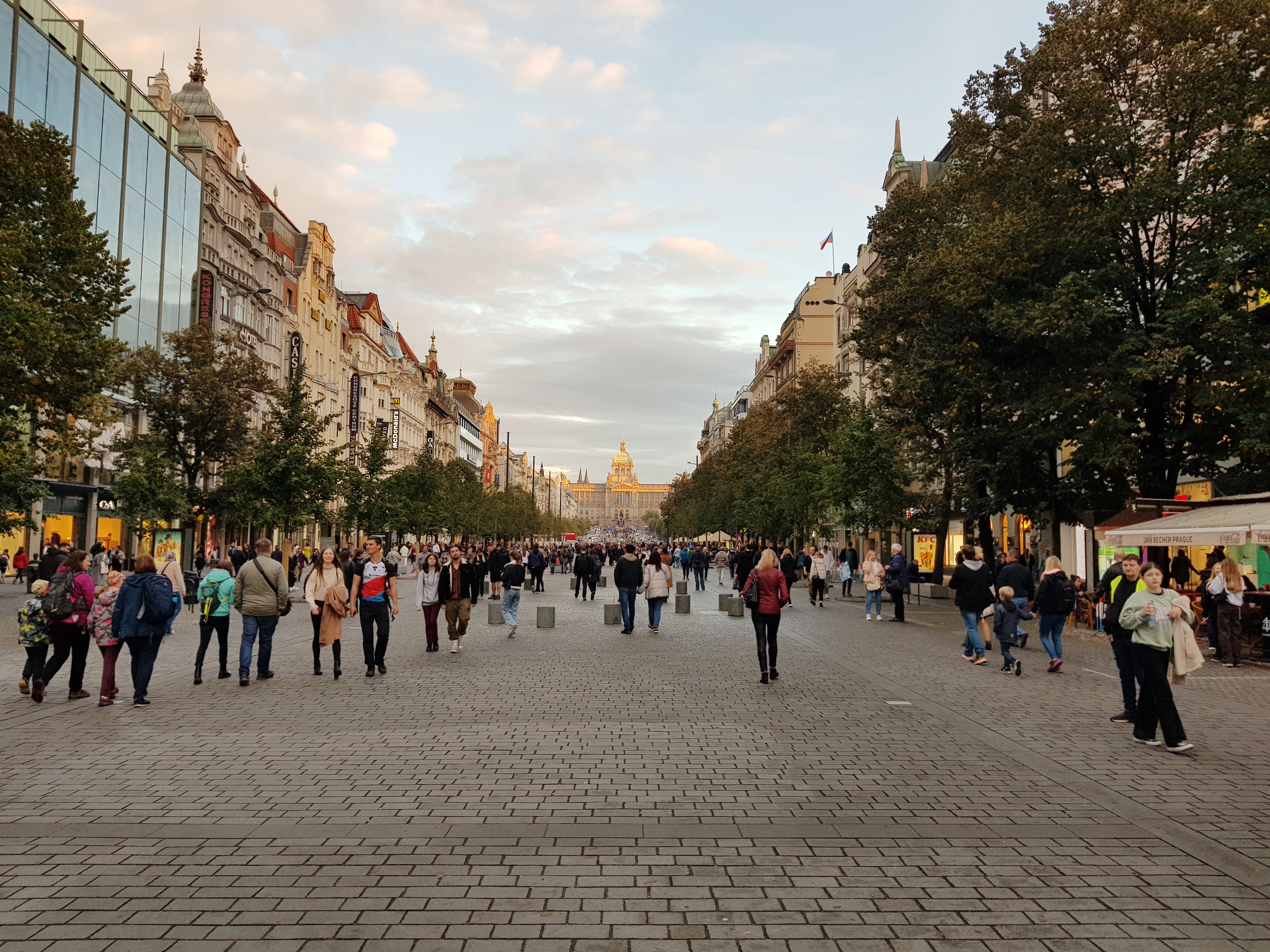
Wenceslas Square features the National Museum and has the busiest pedestrian traffic in the country.

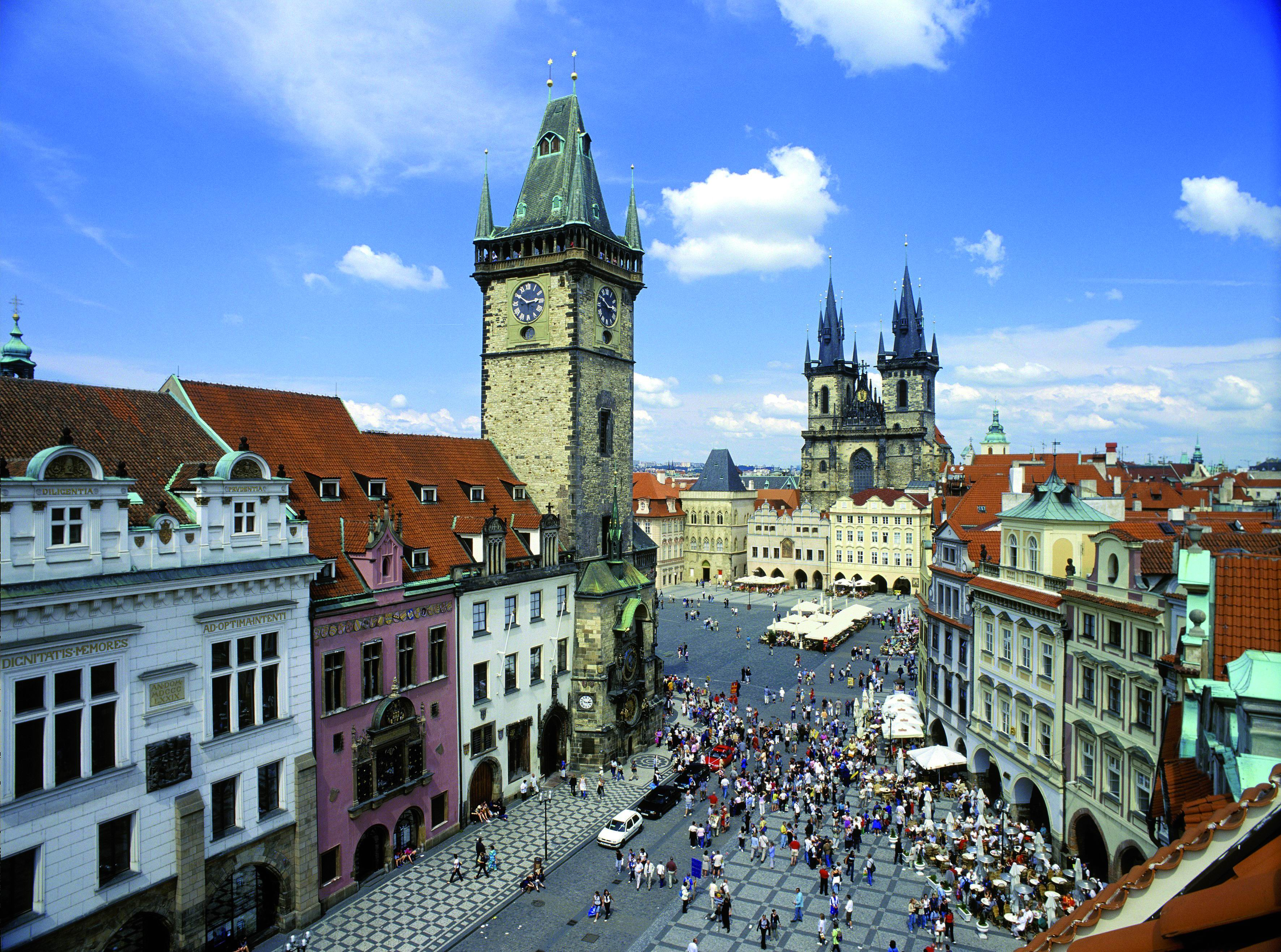
Old Town Square featuring Church of Our Lady before Týn and Old Town City Hall with Prague Orloj

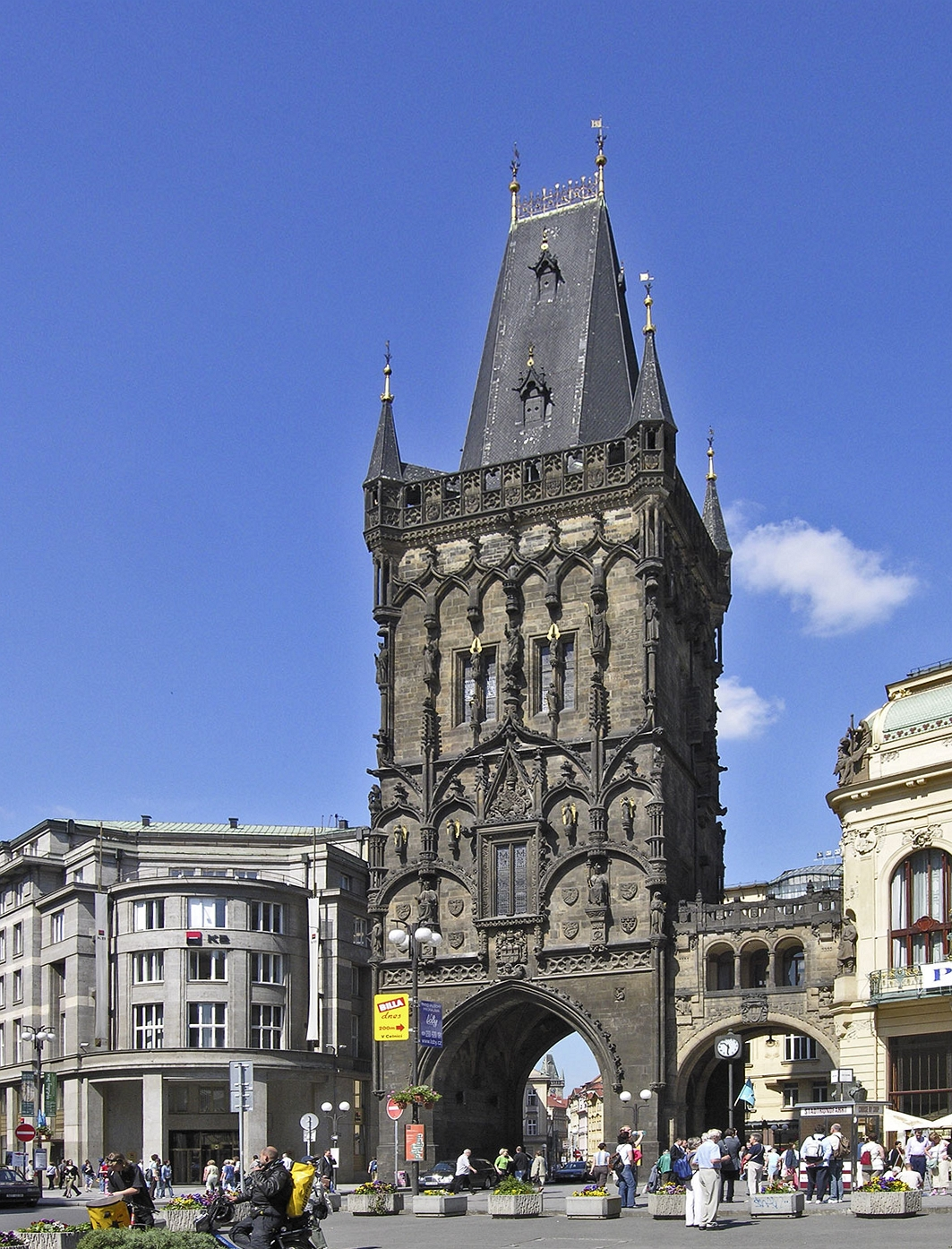
The Gothic Powder Tower

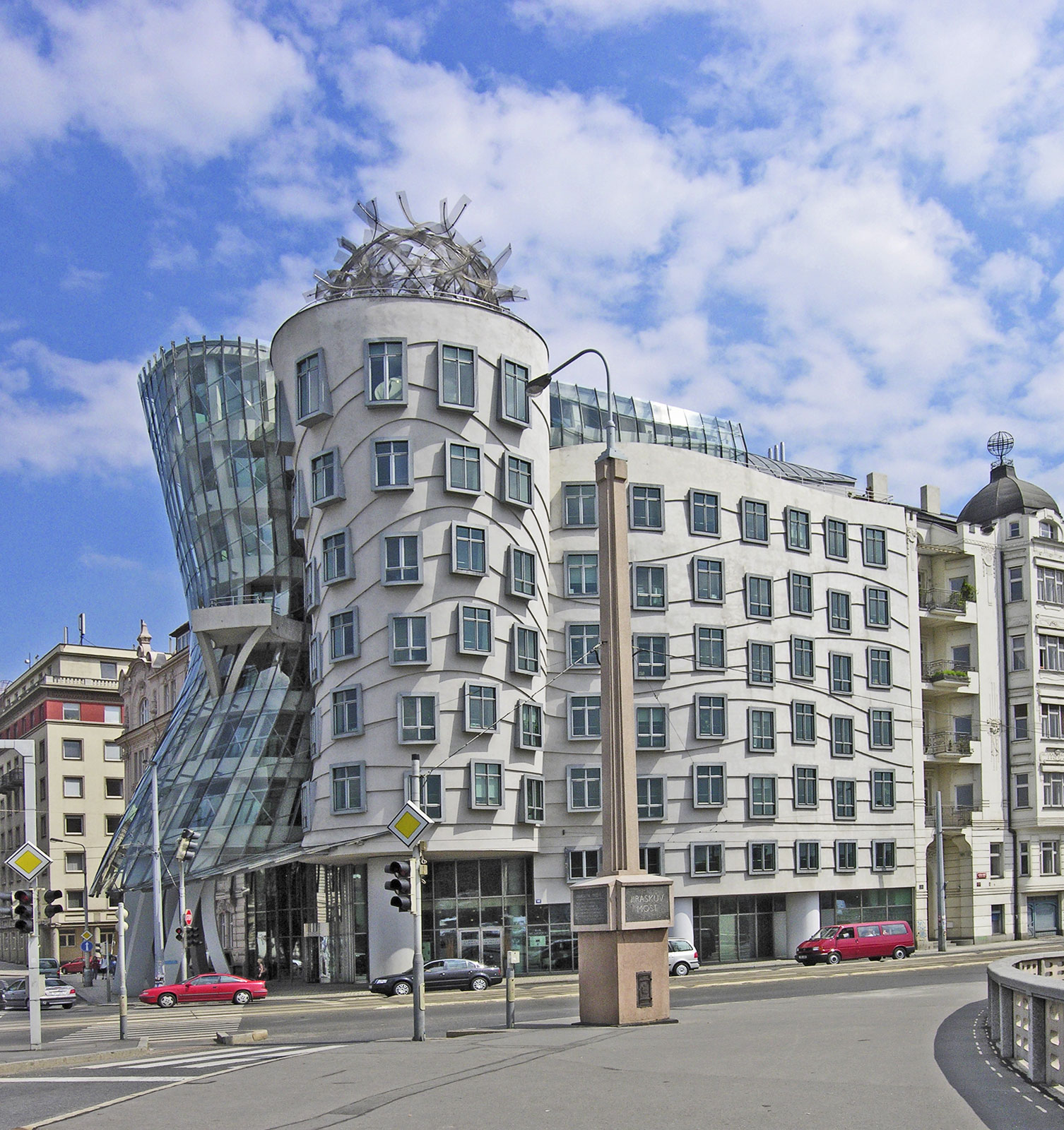
Milunić's and Gehry's Dancing House

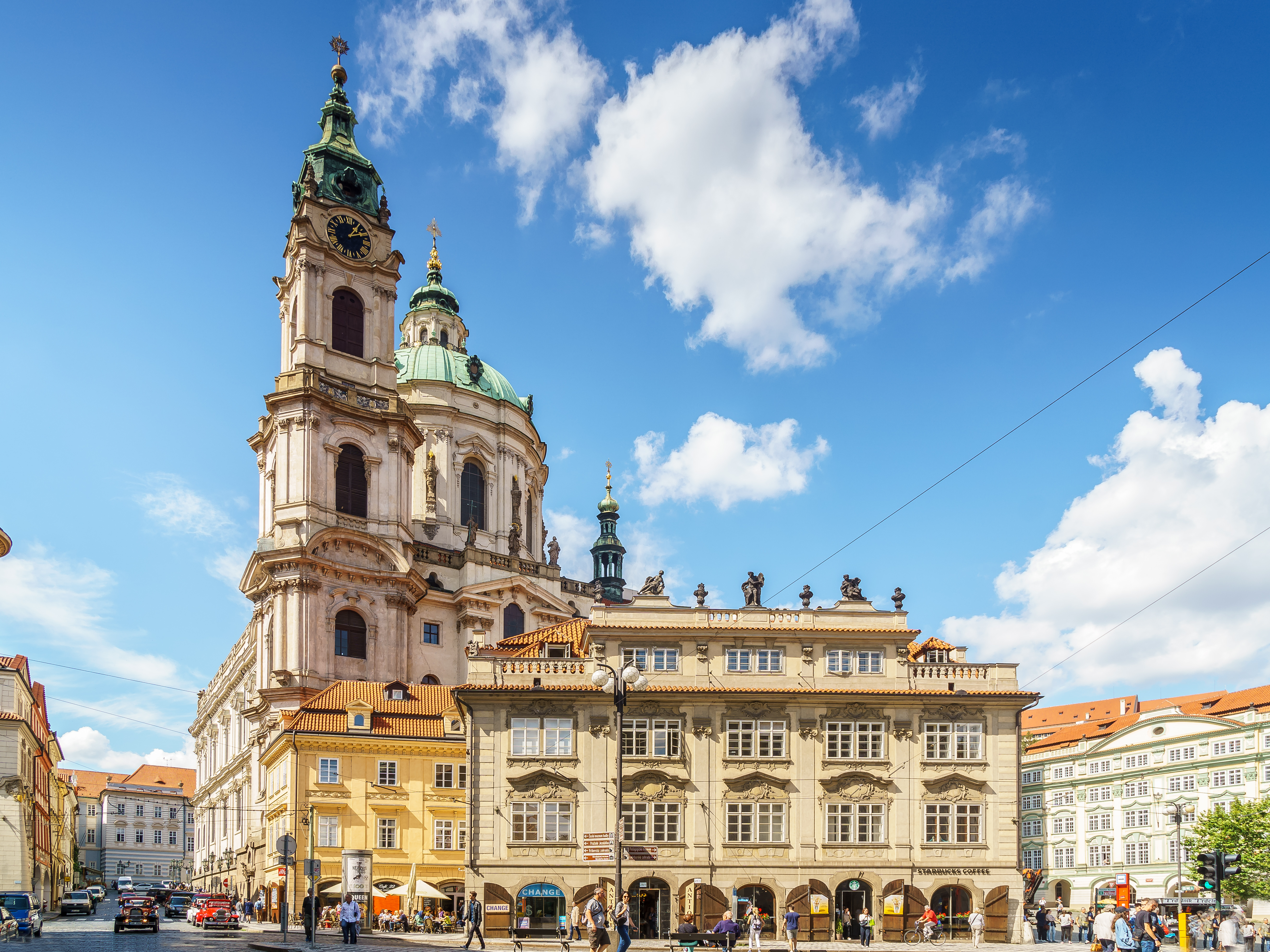
St. Nicholas Church in Malá Strana is the best example of the Baroque style in Prague.

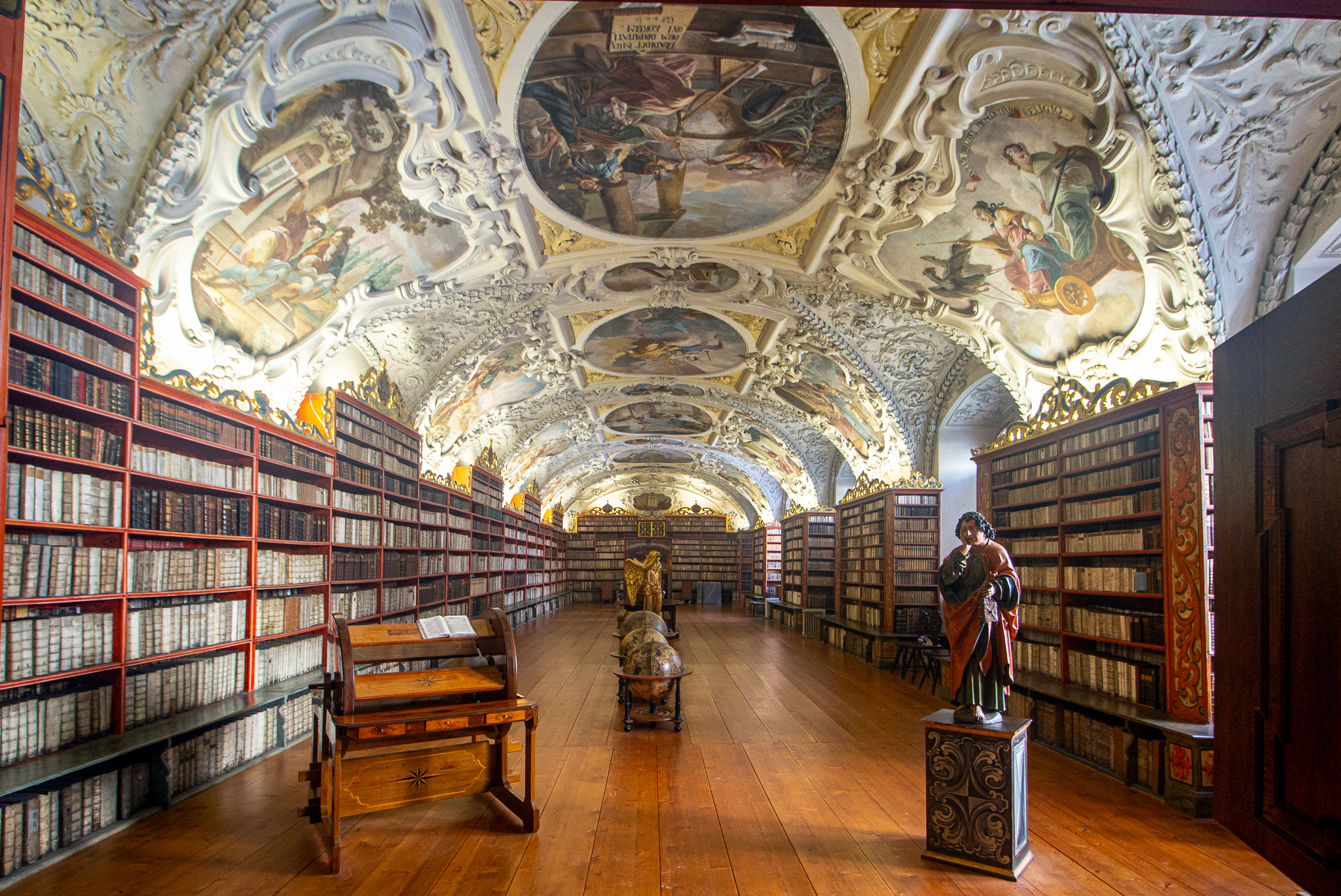
Library of the Strahov Monastery

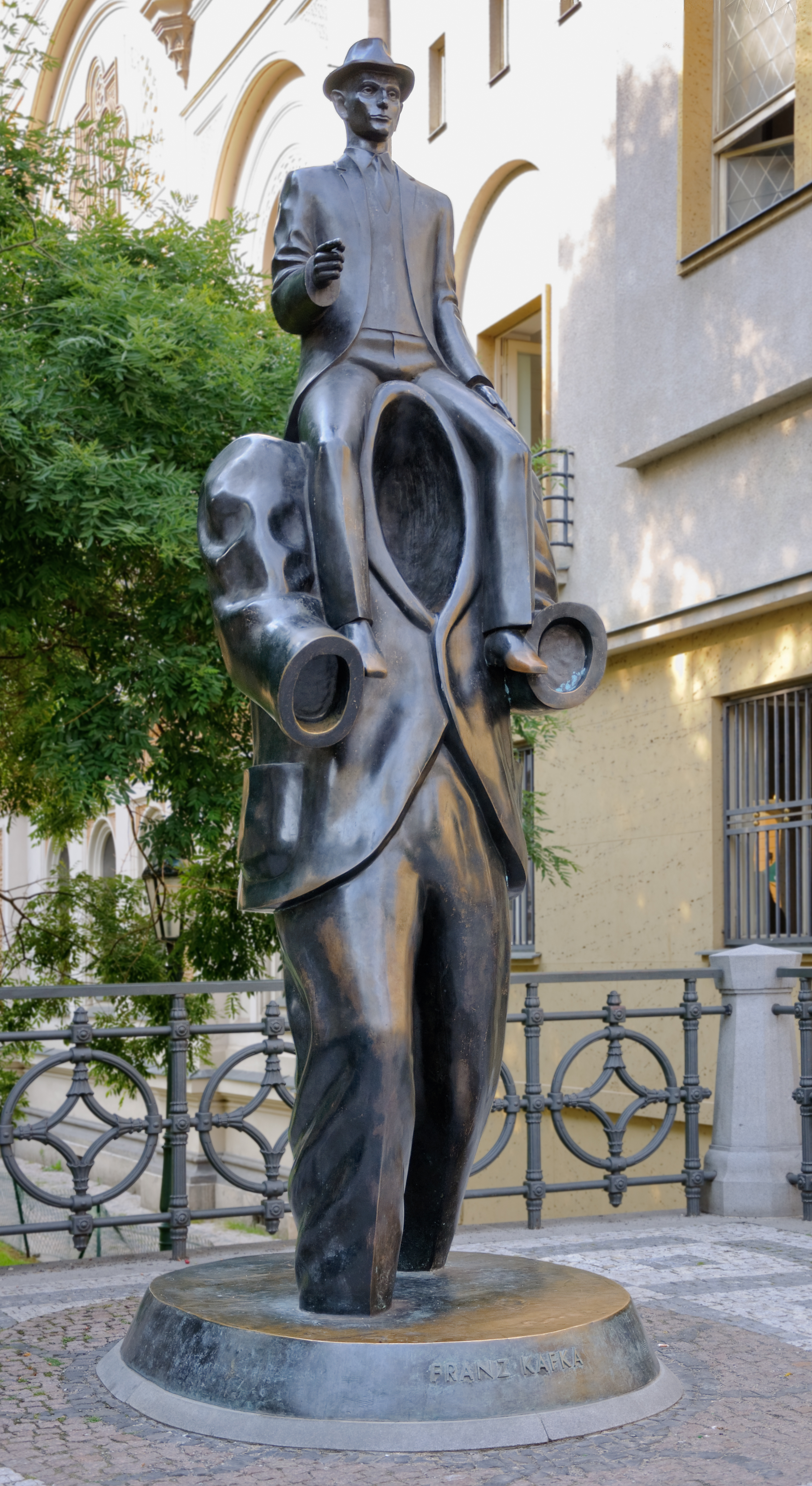
Franz Kafka monument, next to the Spanish synagogue

Since the fall of the Iron Curtain, Prague has become a popular tourist destination. Prague suffered considerably less damage during World War II than some other major cities in the region, allowing most of its historic architecture to stay true to form. It contains architecture in a wide range of styles, including Romanesque, to Gothic, Renaissance, Baroque, Rococo, Neo-Renaissance, Neo-Gothic, Art Nouveau, Cubist, Neo-Classical and ultra-modern architecture.

As of 2016, Prague is classified as a "Beta+" global city according to GaWC studies. Prague ranked sixth in the Tripadvisor world list of best destinations in 2016. Its history makes it a popular tourist destination, and the city receives more than 8.4 million international visitors annually, as of 2017. Furthermore, the city was ranked 7th in the world ICCA Destination Performance Index, measuring performance of conference tourism in 2021. As of December 2024 the city is ranked 3rd among the best places to visit during Christmas.

Prague's Matějská pouť (St. Matthew's fun fair) returned in 2025, featuring attractions such as the Cyclone roller coaster. Originally constructed in 1963 it was an attraction at the Výstaviště fairgrounds. In 2018, it was removed due to urban revitalisation plans. The Štaubert family, custodians of the ride, undertook an extensive restoration, dismantling and refurbishing the structure in Chotouchov near Kolín. The renovated Cyclone restarted for the 2025 Matějská pouť.

Prague is also home to Klementinum, the oldest meteorological station in the Czech Republic with a continuous series of daily temperature measurements since 1775, although occasional measurements began another 20 years earlier. Klementinum is most likely the second-oldest meteorological station in Europe at which temperatures have been measured continuously to this day.

=== Main attractions ===
==== Hradčany and Lesser Town (Malá Strana) ====
- Prague Castle with the St. Vitus Cathedral, which stores the Czech Crown Jewels
- The Charles Bridge (Karlův most)
- The Baroque Saint Nicholas Church
- Church of Our Lady Victorious and Infant Jesus of Prague
- Písek Gate, one of the last preserved city gates of Baroque fortification
- Petřín Hill with Petřín Lookout Tower, Mirror Maze and Petřín funicular
- Lennon Wall
- The Franz Kafka Museum
- Kampa Island, an island with a view of the Charles Bridge
- The Baroque Wallenstein Palace with its garden

==== Old Town (Staré Město) and Josefov ====
- The Astronomical Clock (Orloj) on Old Town City Hall
- The Gothic Church of Our Lady before Týn (Kostel Matky Boží před Týnem) from the 14th century with 80 m high towers
- Stone Bell House
- The vaulted Gothic Old New Synagogue (Staronová Synagoga) of 1270
- Old Jewish Cemetery
- Powder Tower (Prašná brána), a Gothic tower of the old city gates
- Spanish Synagogue with its elaborate interior decoration
- Old Town Square (Staroměstské náměstí) with gothic and baroque architectural styles
- The Art Nouveau Municipal House, a major civic landmark and concert hall known for its Art Nouveau architectural style and political history in the Czech Republic.
- Museum of Decorative Arts in Prague, with an extensive collection including glass, furniture, textiles, toys, Art Nouveau, Cubism, and Art Deco
- Clam-Gallas Palace, a baroque palace from 1713
- Church of St. Martin in the Wall
- Colloredo-Mansfeld Palace, with elements of High Baroque and the later Rococo and Second-Rococo adaptations. Known today for its well-preserved dance hall
- St. Clement's Cathedral, Prague

==== New Town (Nové Město) ====
- Busy and historic Wenceslas Square
- The neo-renaissance National Museum with large scientific and historical collections at the head of Wenceslas Square. It is the largest museum in the Czech Republic, covering disciplines from the natural sciences to specialised areas of the social sciences. The staircase of the building offers a nice view of the New Town.
- The National Theatre, a neo-Renaissance building with a golden roof, alongside the banks of the Vltava river
- The deconstructivist Dancing House (Fred and Ginger Building)
- Charles Square, the largest medieval square in Europe (now turned into a park)
- The Emmaus monastery and WW I Memorial "Prague to Its Victorious Sons" at Palacky Square (Palackého náměstí)
- The museum of the Heydrich assassination in the crypt of the Church of Saints Cyril and Methodius
- Stiassny's Jubilee Synagogue is the largest in Prague
- The Mucha Museum, showcasing the Art Nouveau works of Alphonse Mucha
- Church of St. Apollinaire, Prague
- Church of Saint Michael the Archangel in Prague
- Church of the Assumption of the Virgin Mary and St. Charles the Great, Prague
- Church of Our Lady on the Lawn
- St. Wenceslas Church (Zderaz)
- St. Stephen's Church

==== Vinohrady and Žižkov ====
- National Monument in Vitkov with a large bronze equestrian statue of Jan Žižka in Vítkov Park, Žižkov – Prague 3
- The neo-Gothic Church of St. Ludmila at Míru Square in Vinohrady
- Žižkov Television Tower
- New Jewish Cemetery in Olšany, location of Franz Kafka's grave – Prague 3
- The Roman Catholic Sacred Heart Church at Jiřího z Poděbrad Square
- The Vinohrady grand Neo-Renaissance, Art Nouveau, Pseudo Baroque, and Neo-Gothic buildings in the area between Míru Square, Jiřího z Poděbrad Square, and Havlíčkovy sady park

==== Other places ====
- Vyšehrad Castle with Basilica of St Peter and St Paul, Vyšehrad cemetery and Prague oldest Rotunda of St. Martin
- The Prague Metronome at Letná Park, a giant, functional metronome that looms over the city
- Prague Zoo in Troja, selected as the 7th best zoo in the world by Forbes magazine in 2007 and the 4th best by TripAdvisor in 2015
- Industrial Palace (Průmyslový palác), Křižík's Light fountain, funfair Lunapark and Sea World Aquarium in Výstaviště compound in Holešovice
- Letohrádek Hvězda (Star Villa) in Liboc, a renaissance villa in the shape of a six-pointed star surrounded by a game reserve
- National Gallery in Prague with a large collection of Czech and international paintings and sculptures by artists such as Mucha, Kupka, Picasso, Monet, and Van Gogh
- Opera performances in National Theatre – unlike drama, all opera performances run with English subtitles.
- Anděl, a busy part of the city with modern architecture and a shopping mall
- The large Nusle Bridge, spans the Nusle Valley, linking New Town to Pankrác, with the Metro running underneath the road
- Strahov Monastery, an old Czech premonstratensian abbey founded in 1149 and monastic library
- Hotel International Prague, a four-star hotel and Czech cultural monument
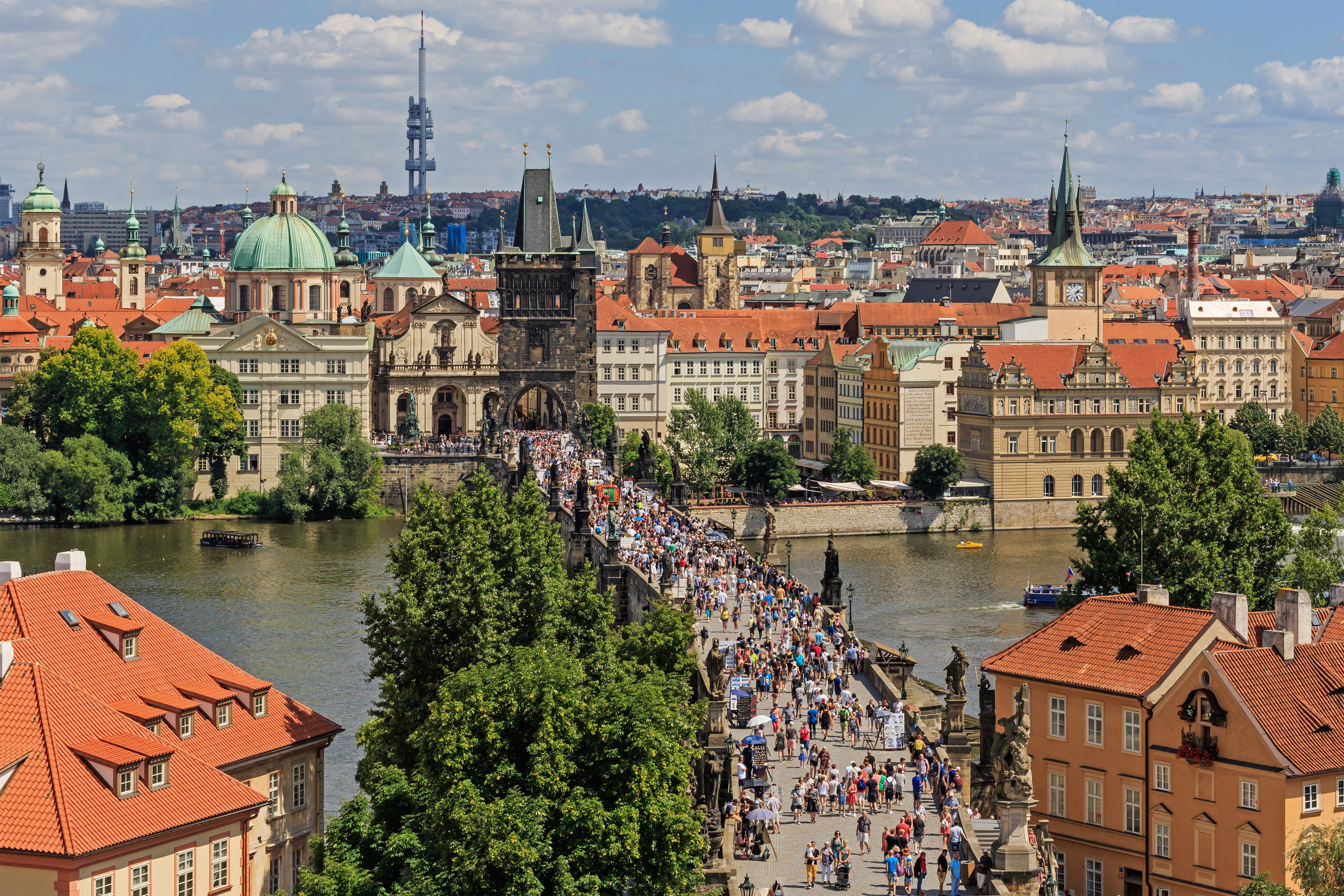
The Charles Bridge is a historic bridge from the 14th century.

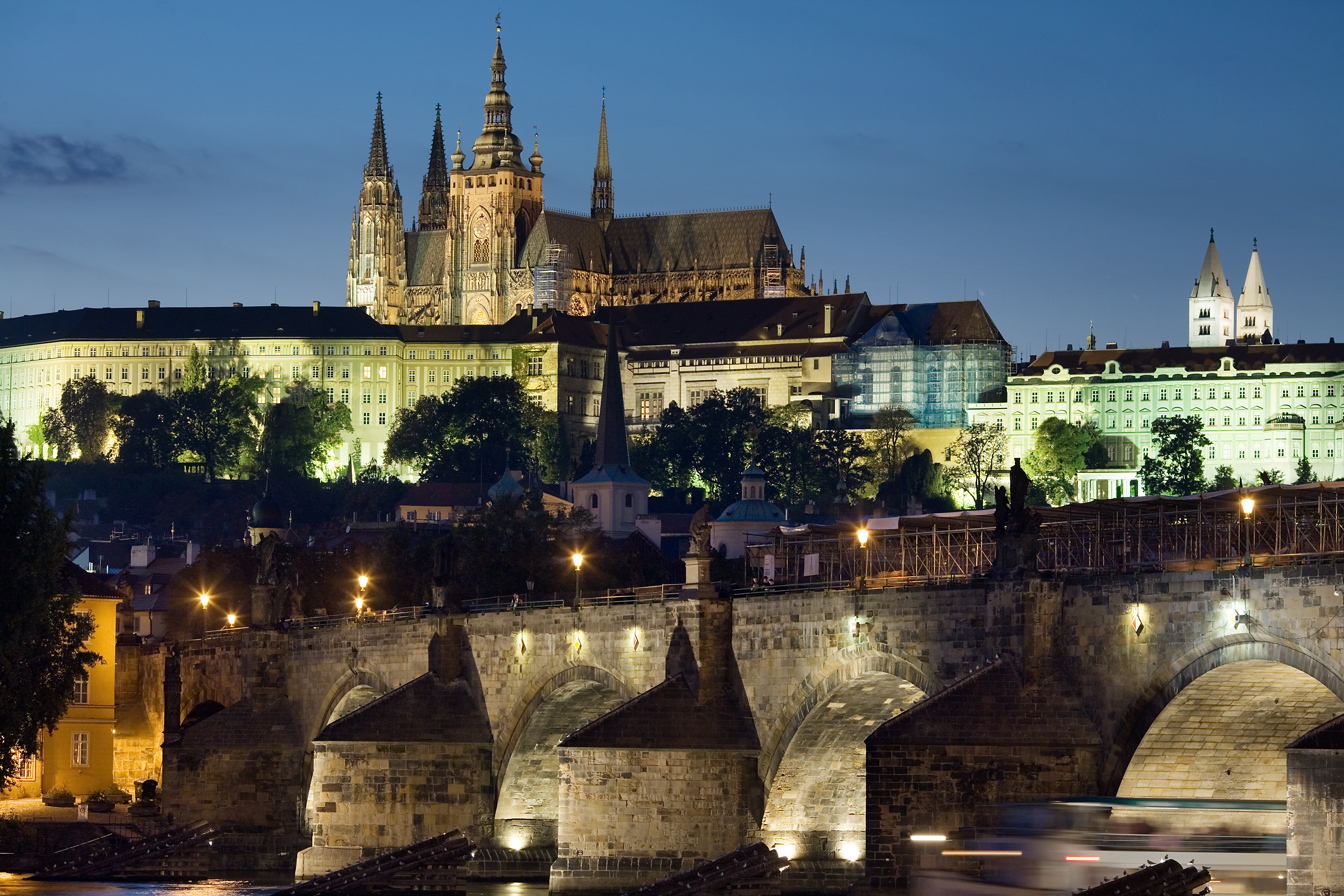
Prague Castle is the biggest ancient castle in the world.

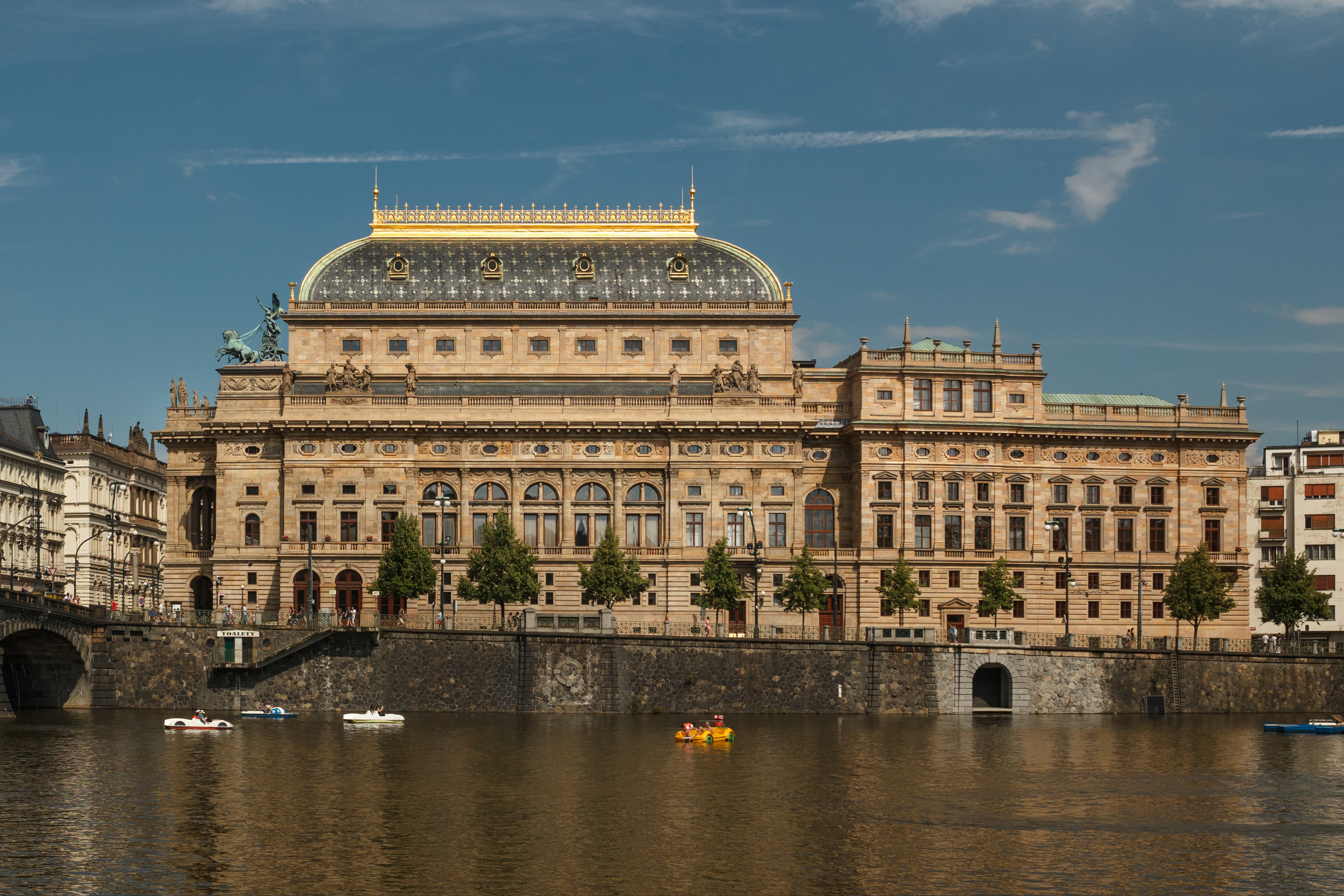
National Theatre offers opera, drama, ballet, and other performances.

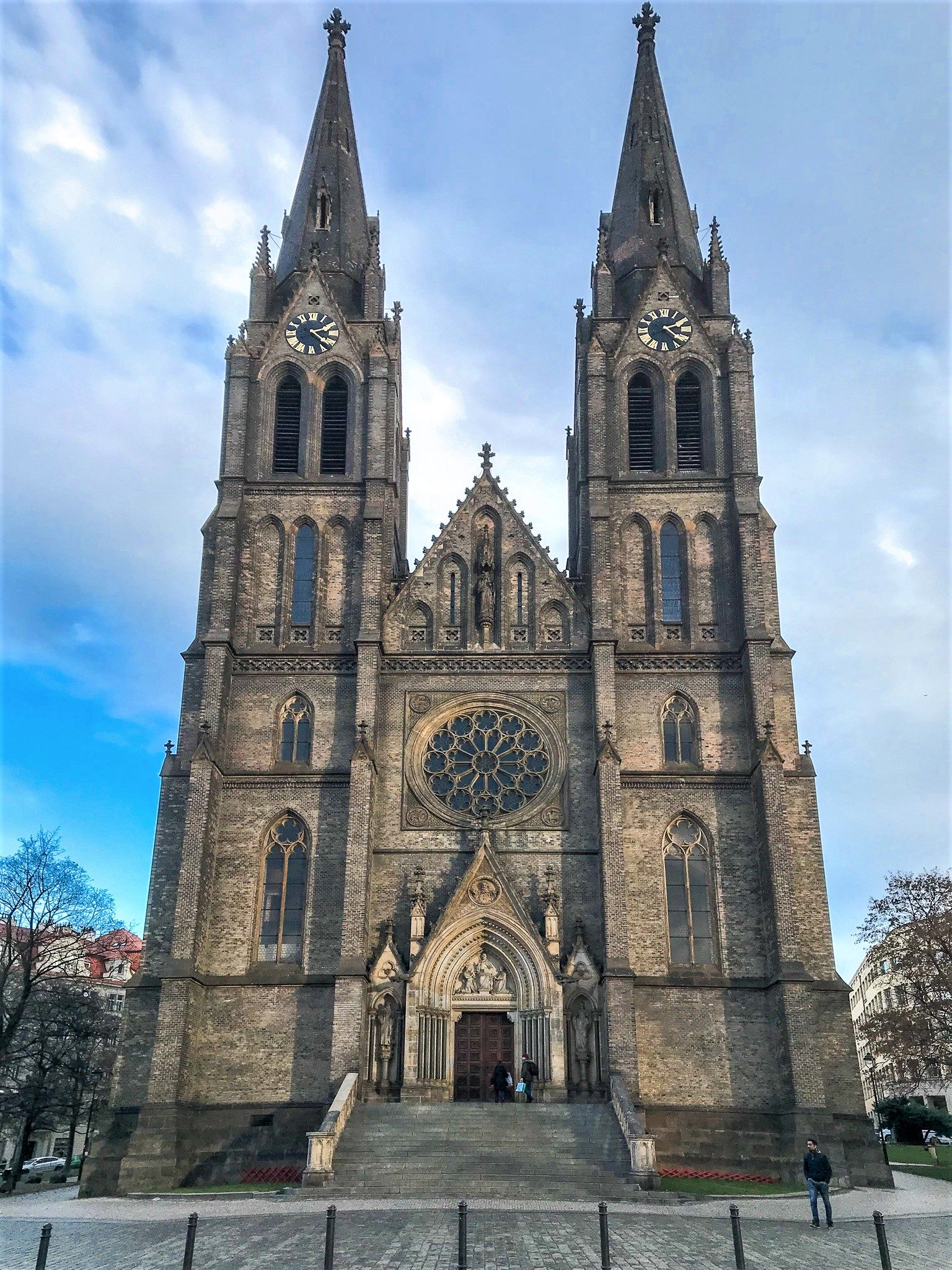
Náměstí Míru Square with Vinohrady Theatre and Church of St. Ludmila

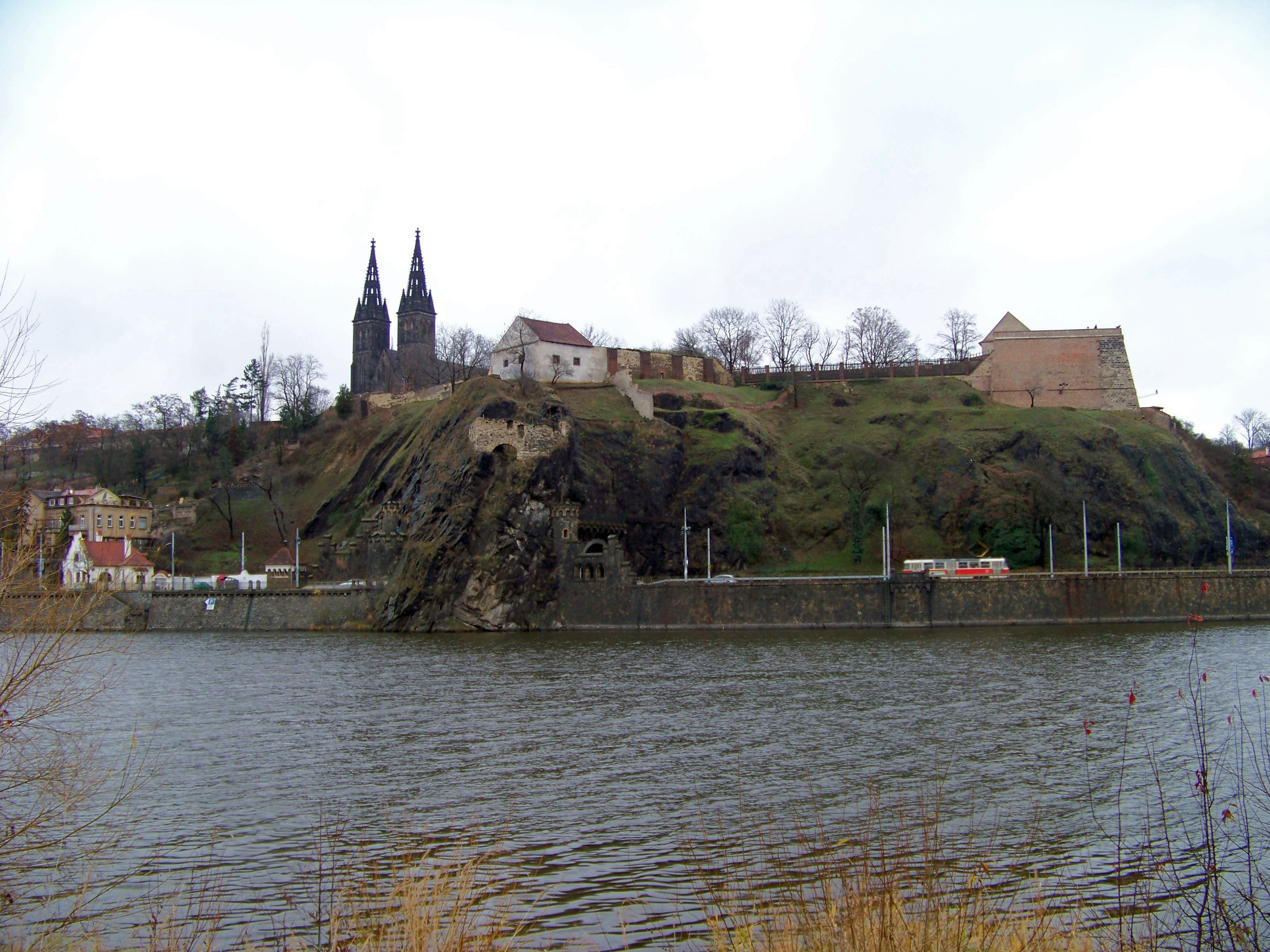
Vyšehrad fortress contains Basilica of St Peter and St Paul, the Vyšehrad Cemetery and the oldest Rotunda of St. Martin.

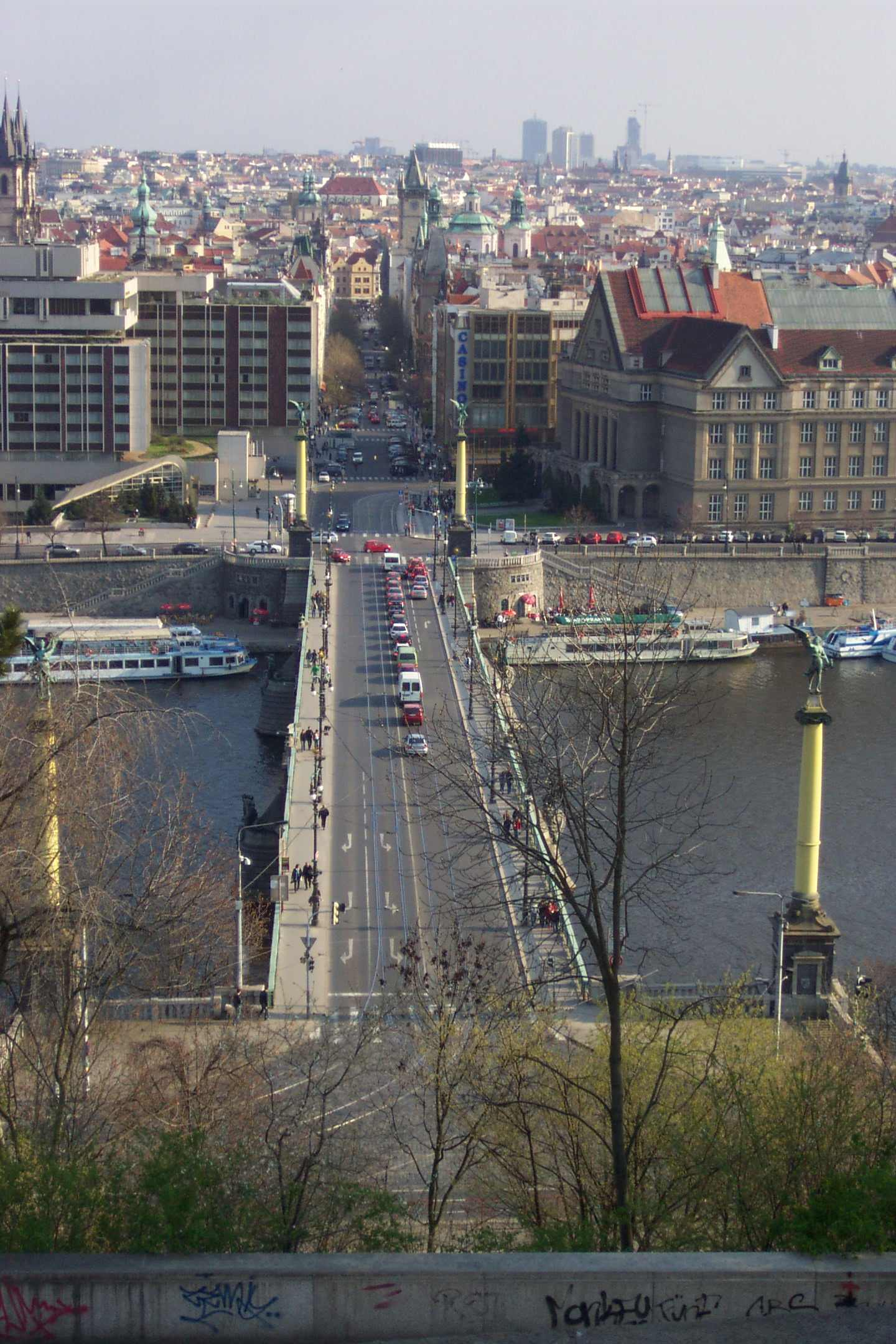
View of Pařížská St. from Letná Park

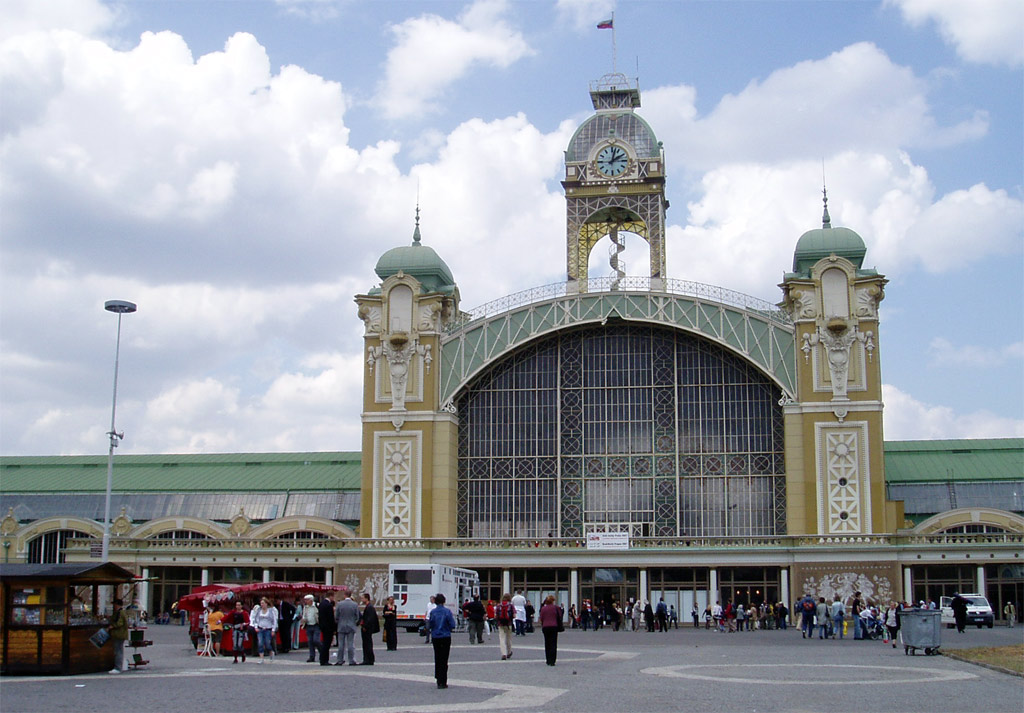
Výstaviště compound contains Průmyslový palác, Křižík's Light Fountain and hosts a funfair Lunapark.

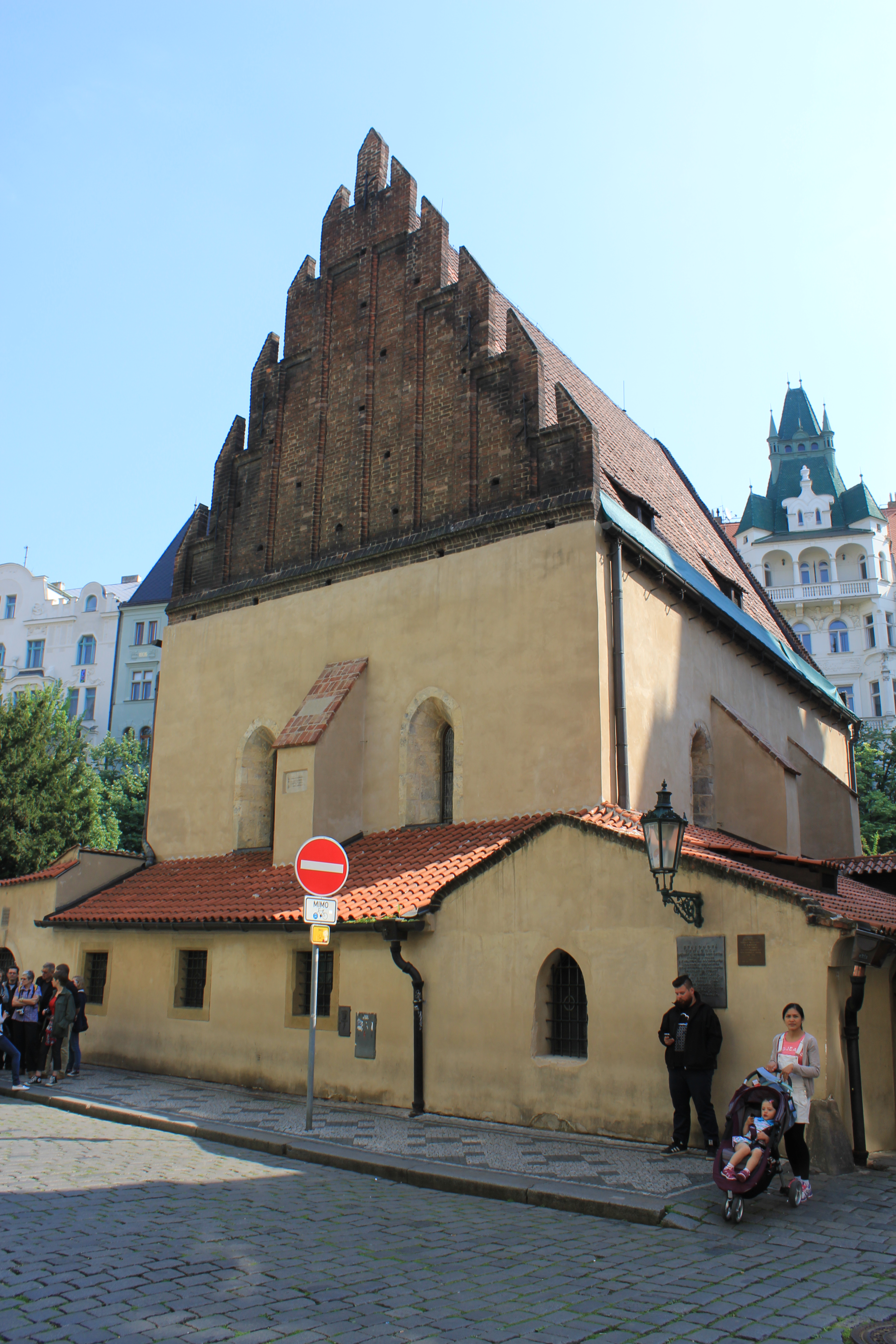
Old New Synagogue is Europe's oldest active synagogue. Legend has Golem lying in the loft.

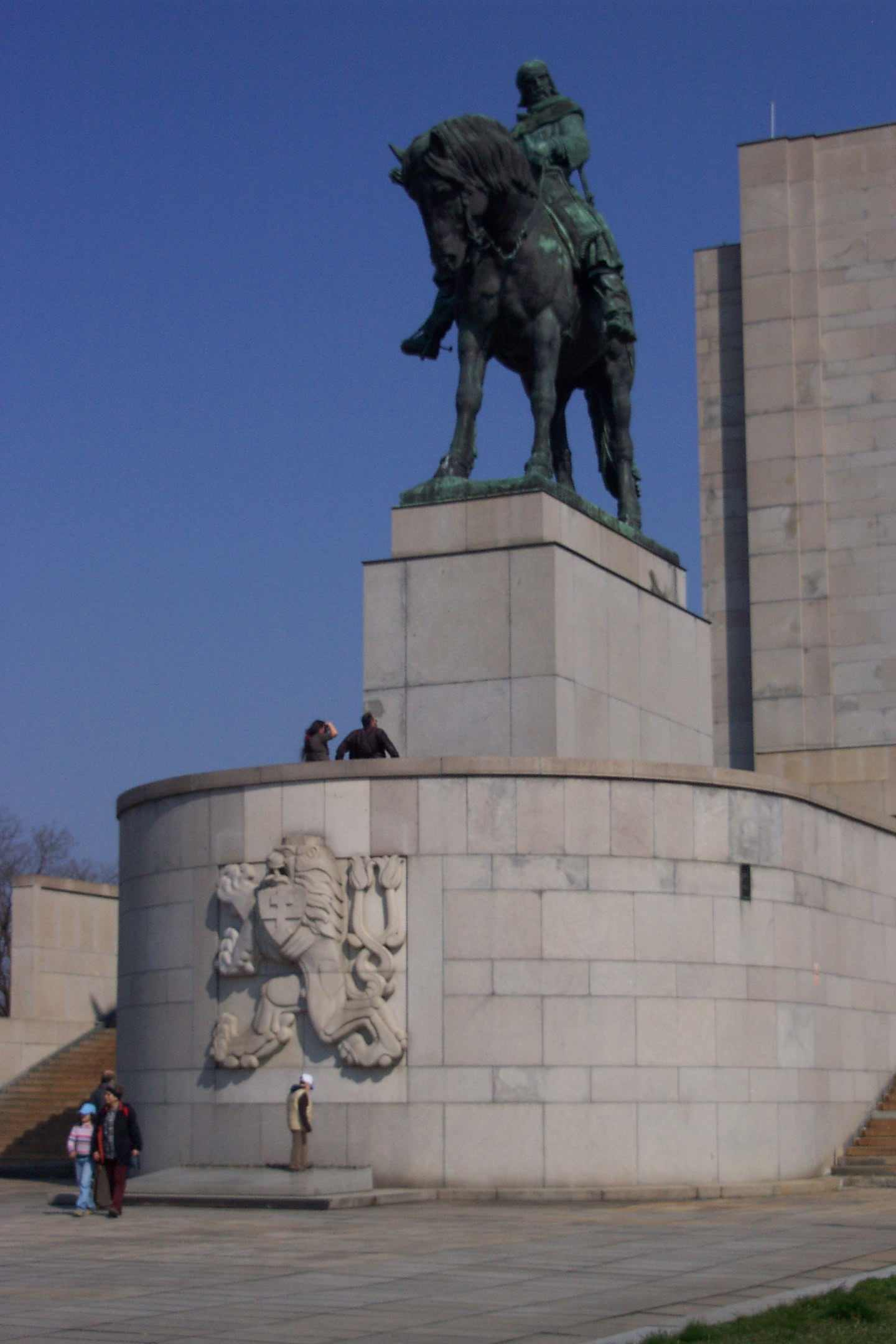
National Monument on Vítkov Hill, the statue of Jan Žižka is the third largest bronze equestrian statue in the world.

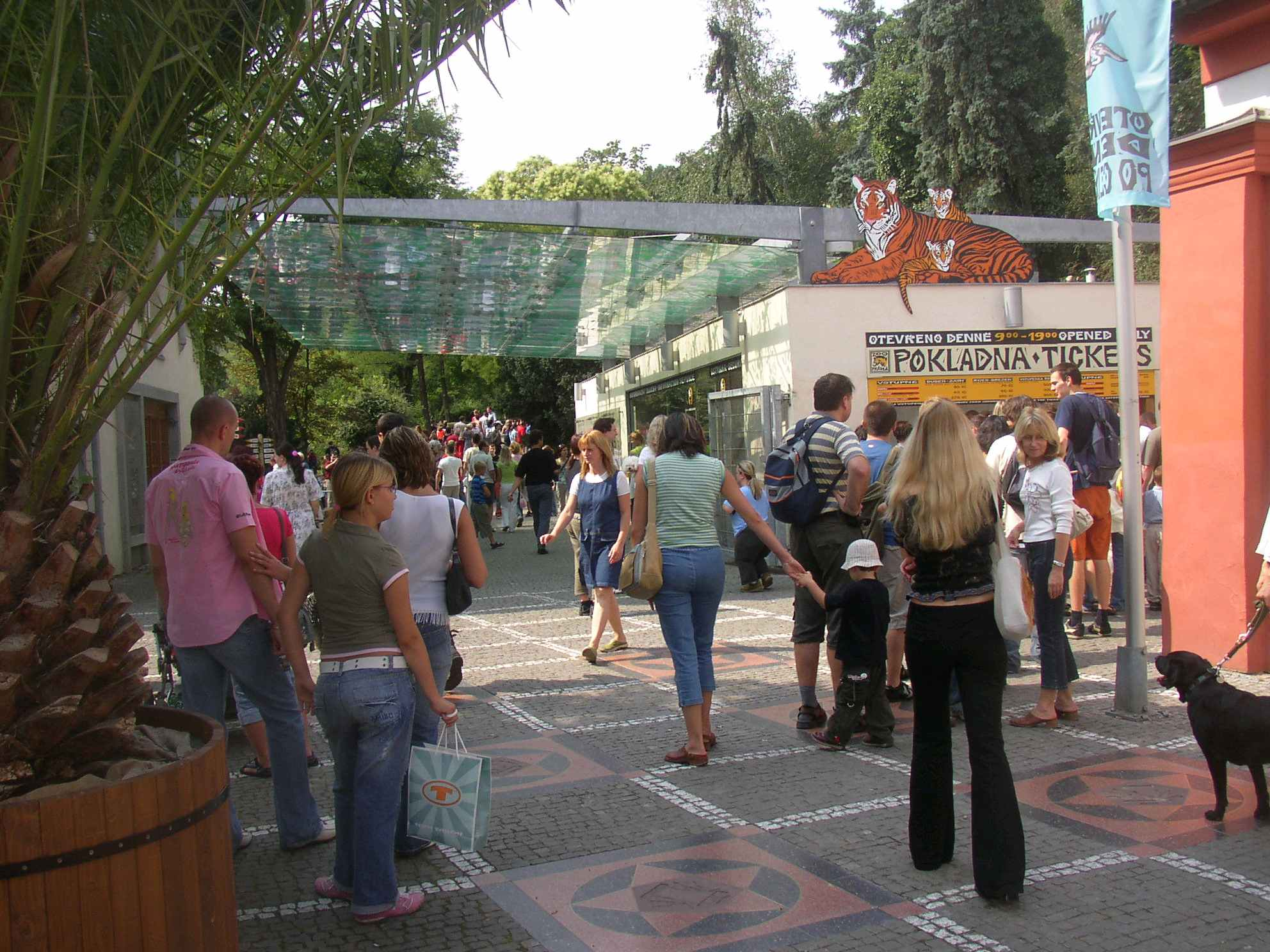
Prague Zoo, selected in 2015 as the fourth best zoo in the world by TripAdvisor

=== Tourism statistics ===
Prague is by far the most visited Czech city. In 2025, Prague was visited by 8,276,026 guests who stayed overnight, of which 81.0% were from abroad. The average number of overnight stays of non-residents was 2.3. Most non-residents arriving to Prague and staying overnight were from the following countries:

Rank	Country	2025	2019
	Total	8,276,026	6,803,741
1	Germany	978,295	900,526
2	United States	507,003	511,950
3	United Kingdom	499,521	495,728
4	Poland	383,176	252,633
5	Slovakia	375,863	310,966
6	Italy	354,440	335,101
7	Spain	240,268	227,345
8	France	227,605	248,911
9	Ukraine	206,480	170,305
10	South Korea	185,150	272,451
11	Austria	153,424	132,500
12	Netherlands	150,646	148,520
13	Mainland China	134,793	309,299
14	Turkey	133,701	71,247
15	Hungary	103,203	108,175
	Russia	21,417	392,968

Petřín funicular was the second most visited tourist destination in 2024 with more than 1,505 thousand visitors. However, it was closed for renovation in 2025.

In 2025, the most visited tourist destinations of Prague were:

Rank	Destination	Number of visitors (in thousands)
1	Prague Castle	2,733.8
2	Prague Zoo	1,449.2
3	Jewish Museum in Prague	542.0
4	Petřín Lookout Tower	447.7
5	Old Town Hall	442.8
6	Prague Botanical Garden	422.0
7	Strahov Monastery	419.5
8	National Monument to the Heroes of the Heydrich Terror	366.0
9	Chairlift in Prague Zoo	342.8
10	Army Museum Žižkov	322.7

== Education ==
Nine public universities and thirty-six private universities are located in the city, including:

=== Public universities ===
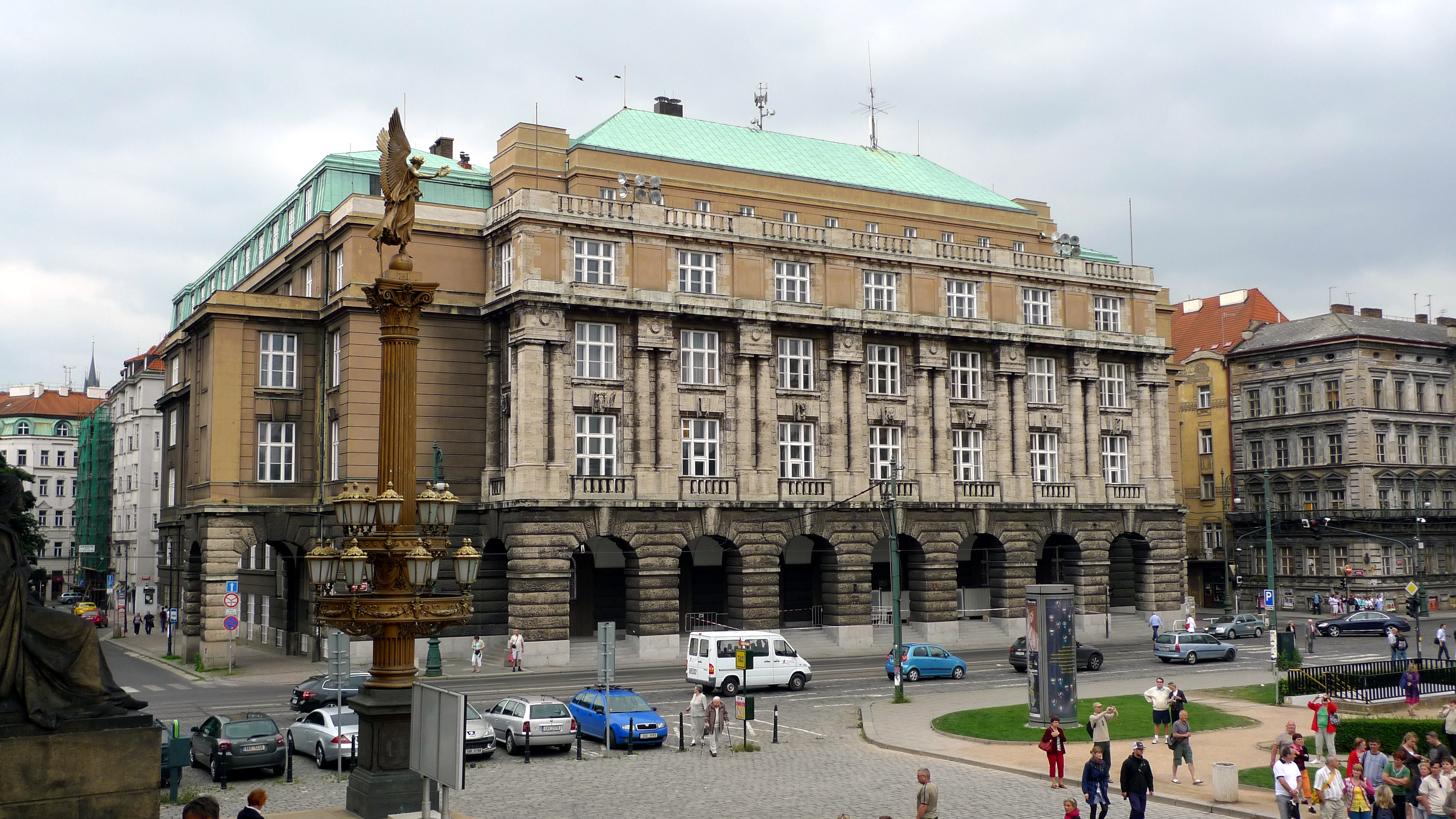
Charles University, founded in 1348, was the first university in Central Europe.

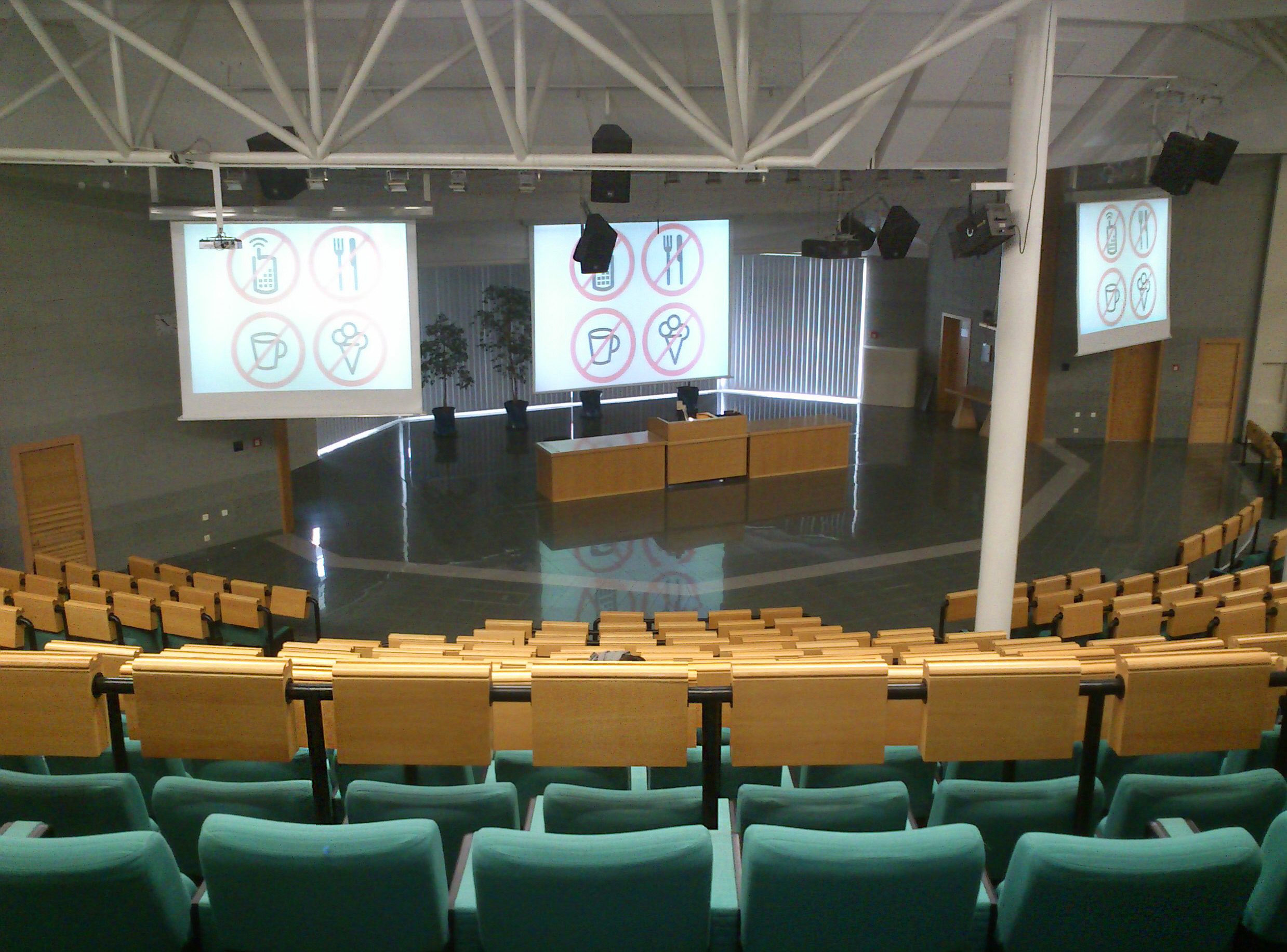
University of Economics, Prague

- Charles University (UK) founded in 1348, the oldest university in Central Europe
- Czech Technical University (ČVUT) founded in 1707
- University of Chemistry and Technology (VŠCHT) founded in 1920
- University of Economics (VŠE) founded in 1953
- Czech University of Life Sciences Prague (ČZU) founded in 1906/1952
- Czech Police Academy (PA ČR), founded in 1993

=== Public arts academies ===
- Academy of Fine Arts (AVU) founded in 1800
- Academy of Arts, Architecture and Design (VŠUP) founded in 1885
- Academy of Performing Arts (AMU) founded in 1945

=== Private universities ===
- Jan Amos Komenský University (UJAK), founded in 2001
- Metropolitan University Prague (MUP), founded in 2001
- The University of Finance and Administration (VSFS) founded in 1999

=== Largest private colleges ===
- University College of Business in Prague (VŠO) founded in 2000
- University of Economics and Management (VŠEM) founded in 2001
- College of Entrepreneurship and Law (VŠPP) founded in 2000
- Institute of Hospitality Management (VŠH) founded in 1999
- College of International and Public Relations Prague (VŠMVV) founded in 2001
- CEVRO University (CEVRO) founded in 2005
- Ambis University (AMBIS) founded in 1994
- Medical College of Nursing (Vysoká škola zdravotnická) founded in 2005
- Anglo-American University (AAVŠ) founded in 1990
- University of New York in Prague (UNYP) founded in 1998

=== International institutions ===
- Instituto Camões
- Goethe-Institut
- Instituto Cervantes
- British Council
- Alliance Française and Institut Français
- Istituto Italiano di Cultura
- Adam Mickiewicz Institute and Polish Institute

== Science, research and hi-tech centres ==
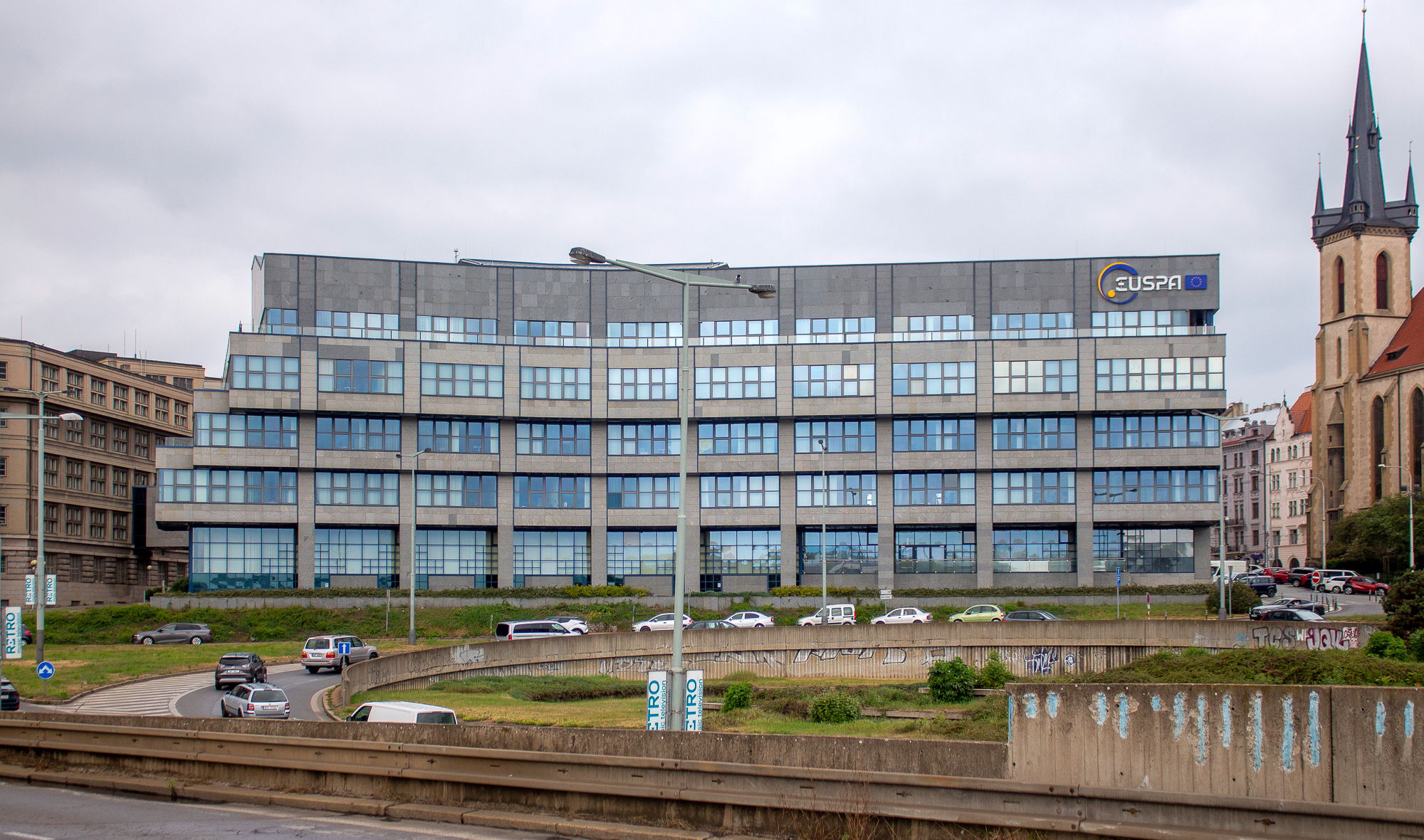
EUSPA headquarters of the Galileo system in Prague's Holešovice

The Prague metropolitan area is an important centre of research. It is the seat of 39 out of 54 institutes of the Czech Academy of Sciences, including the largest ones, the Institute of Physics, the Institute of Microbiology, and the Institute of Organic Chemistry and Biochemistry. It is also a seat of 10 public research institutes, four business incubators and large hospitals performing research and development activities such as the Motol University Hospital or Institute for Clinical and Experimental Medicine, which was the largest transplant centre in Europe as of 2019. Universities seated in Prague (see section Colleges and Universities) also represent important centres of science and research activities.

As of 2008, there were 13,000 researchers (out of 30,000 in the country, counted in full-time equivalents), representing a 3% share of Prague's economically active population. Gross expenditure on research and development accounted for €901.3 million (41.5% of the country's total).

Some well-known multinational companies have established research and development facilities in Prague, among them Siemens, Honeywell, Oracle, Microsoft, and Broadcom.

Prague was selected to host the administration of the EU satellite navigation system Galileo. It started to provide its first services in December 2016, and full completion is expected by 2020.

== Transport ==
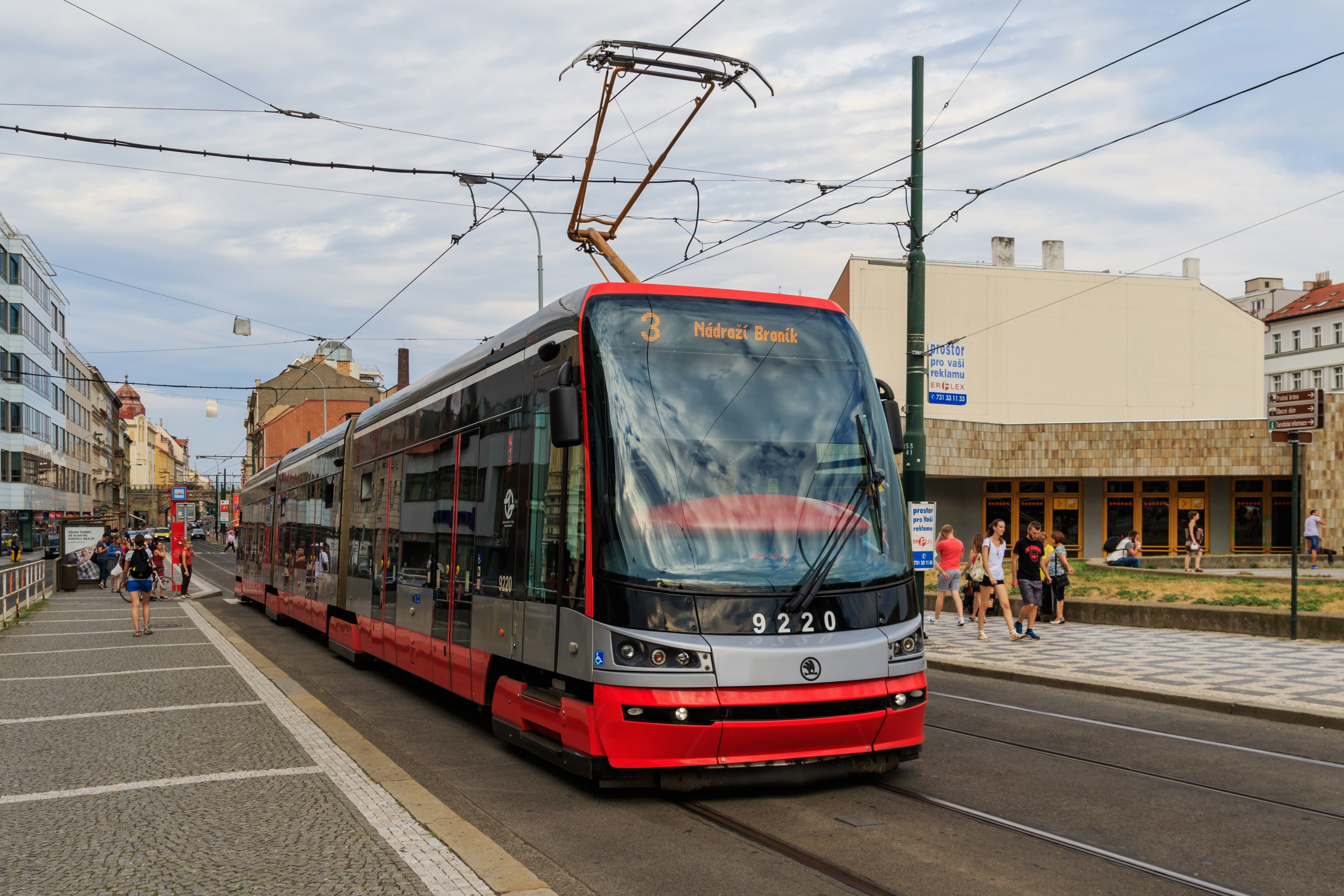
Škoda 15 T, tram of the Prague tram system

The public transport infrastructure consists of the heavily used Prague Integrated Transport (PID, Pražská integrovaná doprava) system, with the Prague Metro (lines A, B, and C) at the network's core. The metro's total length is 65 km (40 mi) with 61 stations in total.

Part of the PID are also the Prague tram system, Prague bus service, commuter trains, funiculars, and seven ferries. Prague has one of the highest rates of public transport usage in the world, with 1.2 billion passenger journeys per year.

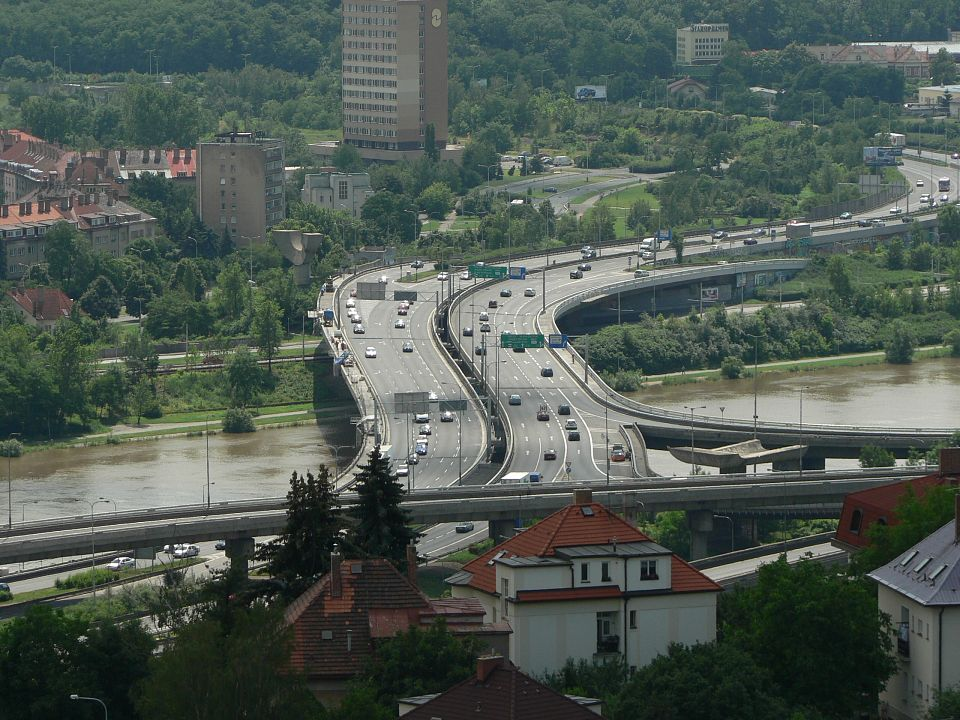
Barrandov Bridge, part of the Prague Inner Ring Road

Inner and outer ring roads carry the main flow of traffic leads through the centre of the city, and around its perimeter. The Inner Ring Road (The City Ring "MO") surrounds central Prague. It is the longest city tunnel in Europe with a length of 5.5 km (3.4 mi), and five interchanges have been completed to relieve congestion in the north-western part of Prague.

The D0 motorway (Outer Ring Road) which, when finished, will connect all major motorways that meet each other in the Prague region and provide faster transit without the necessity to drive through the city. So far 39 km (24 mi), out of a total planned 83 km (52 mi), is in operation. As of 2021, the next 12 km (7 mi) section between Modletice and Běchovice is planned to be completed in 2025.

The city forms the hub of the České dráhy system, with services to all parts of the country and abroad. The railway system links Prague with major European cities. Travel times range between 2 hours to Dresden and 13 hours to Zurich.

Prague's main international railway station is Praha hlavní nádraží; rail services are also available from other main stations: Praha Masarykovo nádraží, Praha-Holešovice and Praha-Smíchov, in addition to suburban stations. Commuter rail services operate under the name Esko Prague, which is part of the PID.

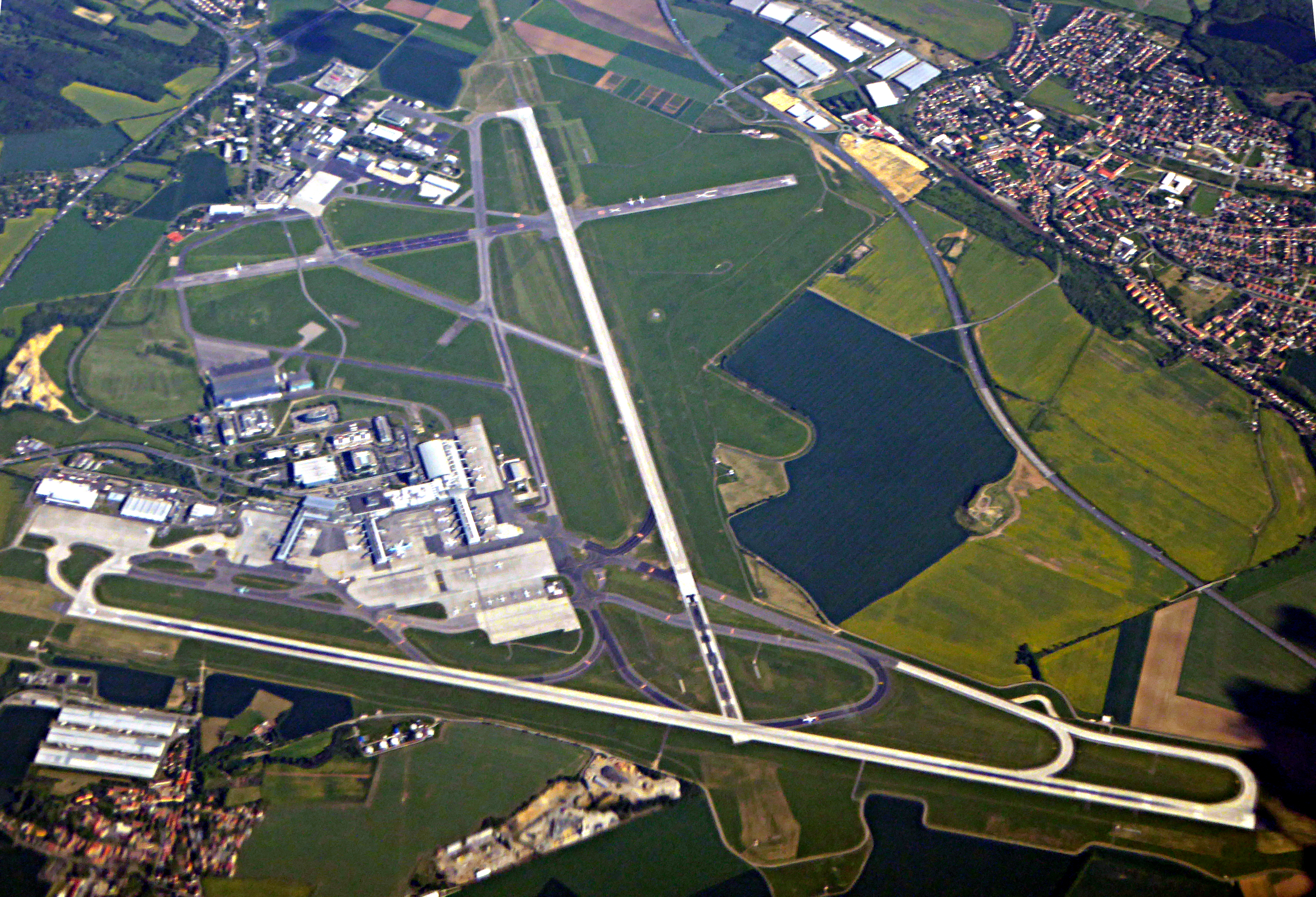
Václav Havel Airport Prague is one of the busiest airports in central Europe, carrying 17.8 million passengers in 2025.

Prague is served by one international airport: Václav Havel Airport Prague, the largest airport in the Czech Republic and one of the largest and busiest airports in Central and Eastern Europe. Other airports in Prague include the city's original airport of Prague-Kbely in the eponymous district, which is serviced by the Czech Air Force. It also houses the Kbely Aviation Museum. The nearby Letňany Airport is mainly used for private aviation and aeroclub aviation.

A small percentage of people commute by bike in Prague, depending on the season. Cycling is very common as a sport or recreation. Bikesharing is partially connected to the public transportation network and subsidised by the city.

== Sport ==
=== Teams ===
- Sparta Prague (Czech First League) – football club
- Slavia Prague (Czech First League) – football club
- Bohemians 1905 (Czech First League) – football club
- Dukla Prague (Czech 2nd Football League) – football club
- Viktoria Žižkov (Czech 2nd Football League) – football club
- HC Sparta Praha (Czech Extraliga) – ice hockey club
- HC Slavia Praha (Czech 2nd Hockey League) – ice hockey club
- USK Praha (National Basketball League) – basketball club
- Prague Lions (European League of Football) –American football
- AK Markéta Praha (speedway club)
- PSK Olymp Praha (athletics club)

=== Stadia and arenas ===
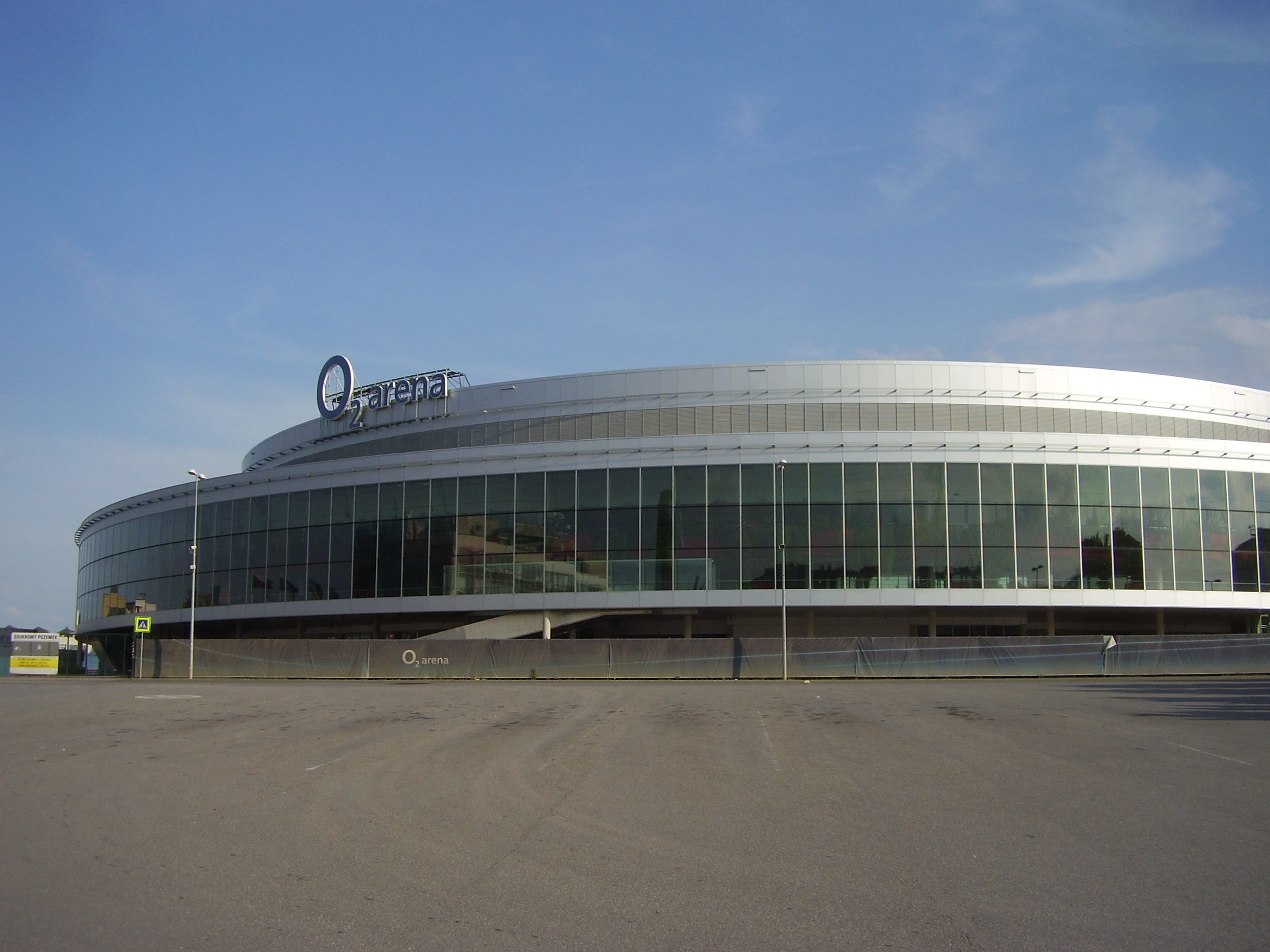
The O2 Arena was built to host the 2004 Men's Ice Hockey World Championships.

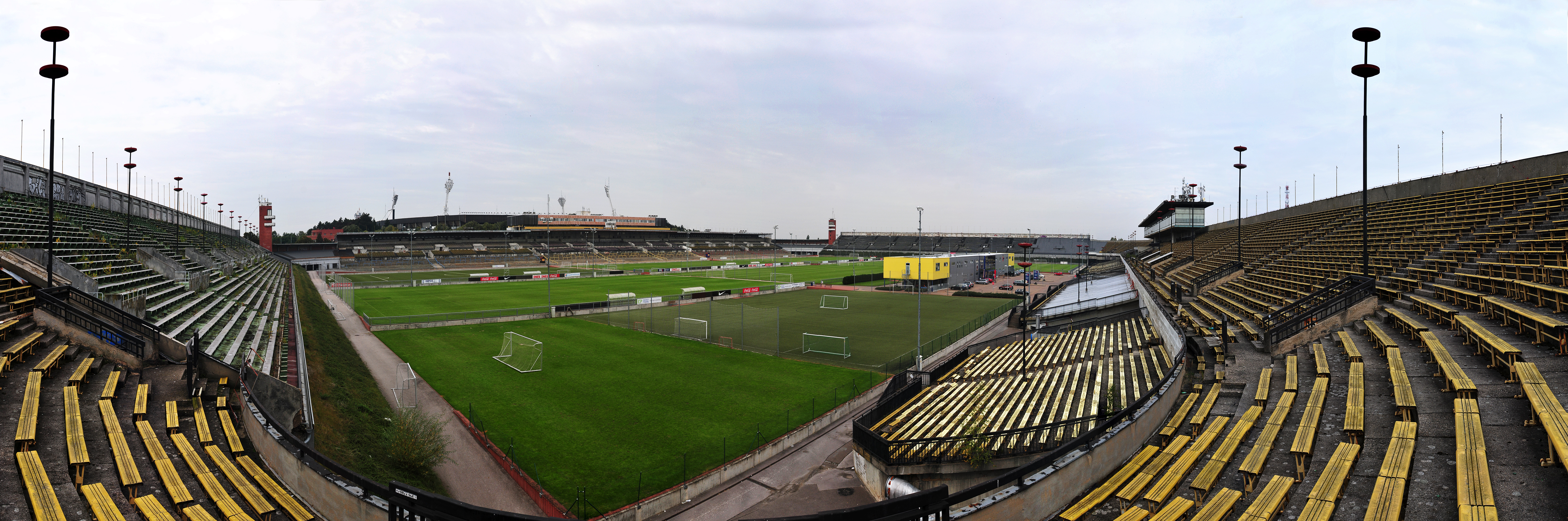
Great Strahov Stadium

Notably, the O2 Arena is the second largest ice hockey arena in Europe. It hosted 2004, 2015 IIHF World Championship and 2024, NHL 2008 and 2010 Opening Game and Euroleague Final Four. Prague is also home to the Great Strahov Stadium, which holds the title of the largest current or closed stadium in the world. During communist era, between 1955 and 1990, the stadium hosted Spartakiads.

Prague's football stadiums include the Fortuna Arena and Stadion Letná (where the Czech Republic national football team play some of their matches). Smaller football venues include FK Viktoria Stadion in Žižkov, and Stadion Juliska.

Other venues include; Markéta Stadium (speedway and athletics stadium), and Gutovka (a sport area with a large concrete skatepark, the highest outdoor climbing wall in Central Europe, four beach volleyball courts and children's playground). The Central European Beach Volleyball Championship 2018 took place here.

=== Events ===
- Prague International Marathon
- Prague Open – Tennis Tournament
- Prague Chess Festival
- Sparta Prague Open – Tennis Tournament held at TK Sparta Prague in Prague 7
- Josef Odložil Memorial – athletics meeting
- World Ultimate Club Championships 2010 concluded in Strahov and Eden Arena.
- Mystic SK8 Cup – World Cup of Skateboarding venue held at the Štvanice skatepark

== International relations ==
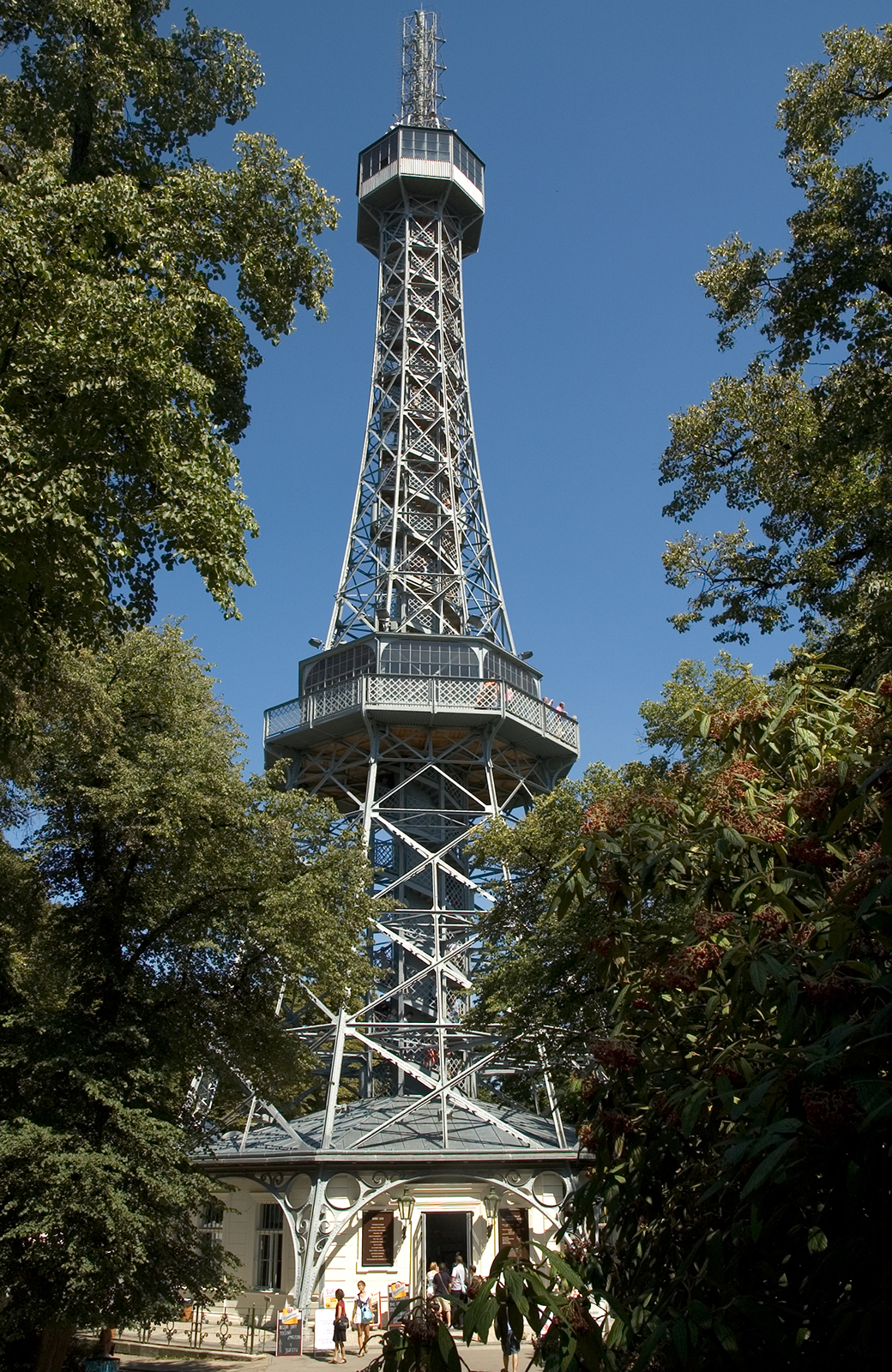
Petřín Lookout Tower, an observation tower inspired by the Eiffel Tower in Paris, France, and built at Petřín hill

The city of Prague maintains its own EU delegation in Brussels called Prague House.

Prague was the location of U.S. President Barack Obama's speech on 5 April 2009, which led to the New START treaty with Russia, signed in Prague on 8 April 2010.

The annual conference Forum 2000, which was founded by former Czech President Václav Havel, Japanese philanthropist Yōhei Sasakawa, and Nobel Peace Prize laureate Elie Wiesel in 1996, is held in Prague. Its main objective is "to identify the key issues facing civilization and to explore ways to prevent the escalation of conflicts that have religion, culture, or ethnicity as their primary components", and also intends to promote democracy in non-democratic countries and to support civil society. Conferences have attracted several prominent thinkers, Nobel laureates, former and acting politicians, business leaders, and other individuals like: Frederik Willem de Klerk, Bill Clinton, Nicholas Winton, Oscar Arias Sánchez, Dalai Lama, Hans Küng, Shimon Peres and Madeleine Albright.

=== Twin towns – sister cities ===
Prague is twinned with:

- Berlin, Germany
- Brussels, Belgium
- Chicago, United States
- Frankfurt am Main, Germany
- Hamburg, Germany
- Kyoto, Japan
- Miami-Dade County, United States
- Nuremberg, Germany
- Phoenix, United States
- Taipei, Taiwan

=== Namesakes ===
Several settlements in the United States are derived from or similar to the name of Prague. In many of these cases, Czech emigration has left several namesake cities scattered over the globe, with a notable concentration in the New World. These settlements include Praha, Texas, Prague, Oklahoma, Prague, Nebraska, and New Prague, Minnesota.

Additionally, Kłodzko is sometimes referred to as "Little Prague" (German: Klein-Prag). Although now in Poland, it had been traditionally a part of Bohemia until 1763 when it became part of Silesia.

== See also ==
- Churches in Prague
- List of museums in Prague
- List of people from Prague
- Outline of Prague
- Outline of the Czech Republic
