= Cathedral of St Lawrence, Prague =

Church in Prague

Coordinates: 50°4′59.14″N 14°23′46″E

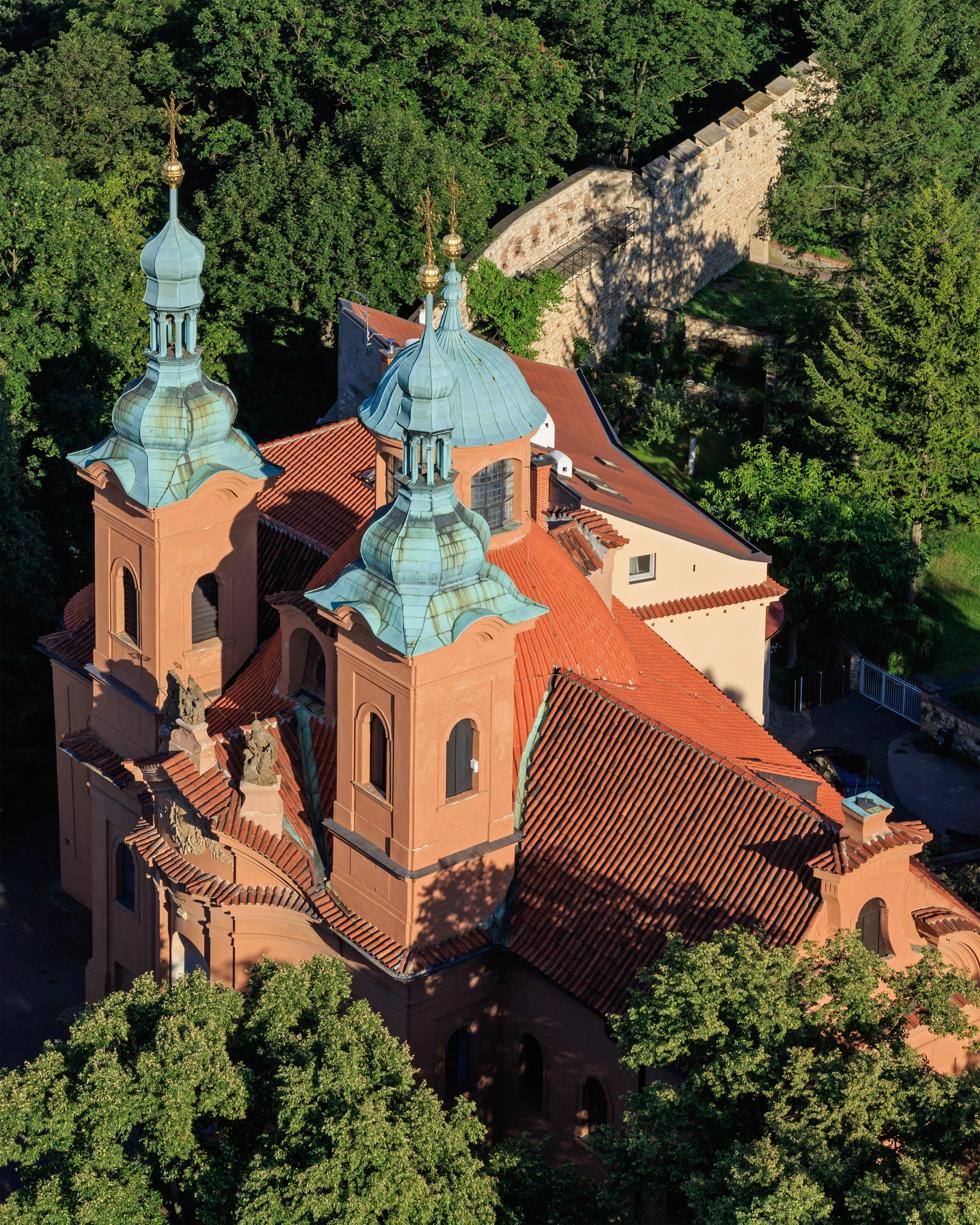
Church of Saint Lawrence as seen from the Petřín Lookout Tower

The Church of Saint Lawrence (Czech: Kostel svatého Vavřince) in Prague is a church of the Old Catholic Church of the Czech Republic. It is located on Petřín hill, next to Petřín Lookout Tower and the Hunger Wall. It was originally a Romanesque church, later rebuilt in the Baroque style by Kilian Ignaz Dientzenhofer.
