= Radyně Castle =

Castle in Czech Republic

Radyně
- Starý Plzenec, Plzeň Region
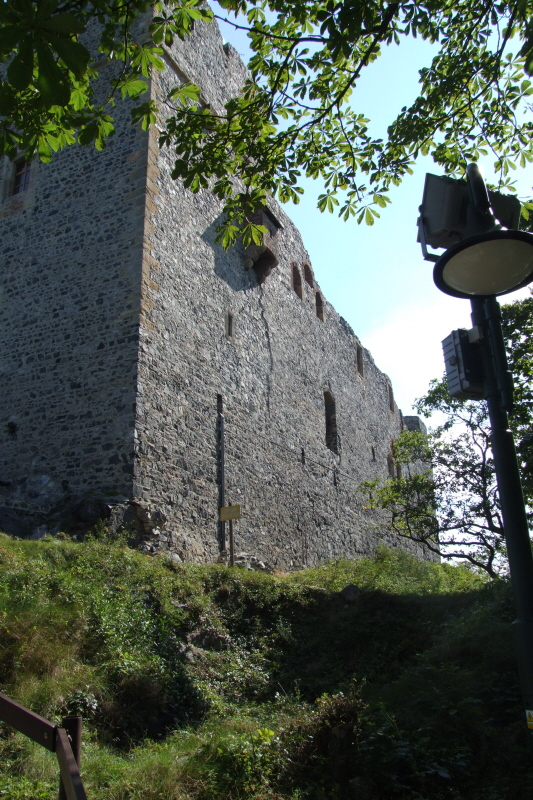
- Radyně Castle

Site information
- Type: Castle

Location
- Location in the Czech Republic
- Coordinates: 49°40′51.74″N 13°27′54.66″E

Site history
- Built: 1361

Radyně Castle is a castle situated on a hill of the same name, near the town of Starý Plzenec, in the Plzeň Region of the Czech Republic. Radyně, like the similarly conceived Kašperk, represents the height of the 14th-century trend towards the merging of castle buildings.

== History ==
When the castle of Starý Plzenec fell into disrepair in the first half of the 13th century, it was necessary to build a new centre of royal power for the administration of the region of Plzeň. Construction apparently began in 1353, during the rule of Charles IV, and was completed in 1361. The original name of Karlskrone (Charles' Crown) did not become commonly used in the district, and the castle gradually took the name of the hill on which it was built - Radyně.

The burgraves who governed the region were based in Radyně, and by the end of the 15th century it had been acquired by the Sternberg family (1496–1561), who settled at the more comfortable castle at Bechyně. Its counterpart at Radyně, which was accessible only with difficulty, started to fall into disrepair, and its fate was sealed in the first quarter of the 16th century when it was burned down. As early as 1558, record indicated that it was abandoned, and not even the affluent Černín of the Crudenice family, owners of the castle as well as the surrounding district in the 18th century, invested in repair work. The mysterious abandoned ruin had to wait until the coming of the Romantic movement in the 19th century for more interest to be shown in it. Minor repairs and alterations were however destroyed by fire in 1886.

In recent years, the castle has been progressively renovated, and a permanent exhibition devoted to its history can now be seen. The tower is open to visitors of the castle.

Radyně Castle is also depicted on the theatre curtain of the Pilsener Theater, which was created by the painter Augustin Němejc between years 1899 and 1902. The curtain is one of the most beautiful and valuable in Czech Republic.

== Picture ==
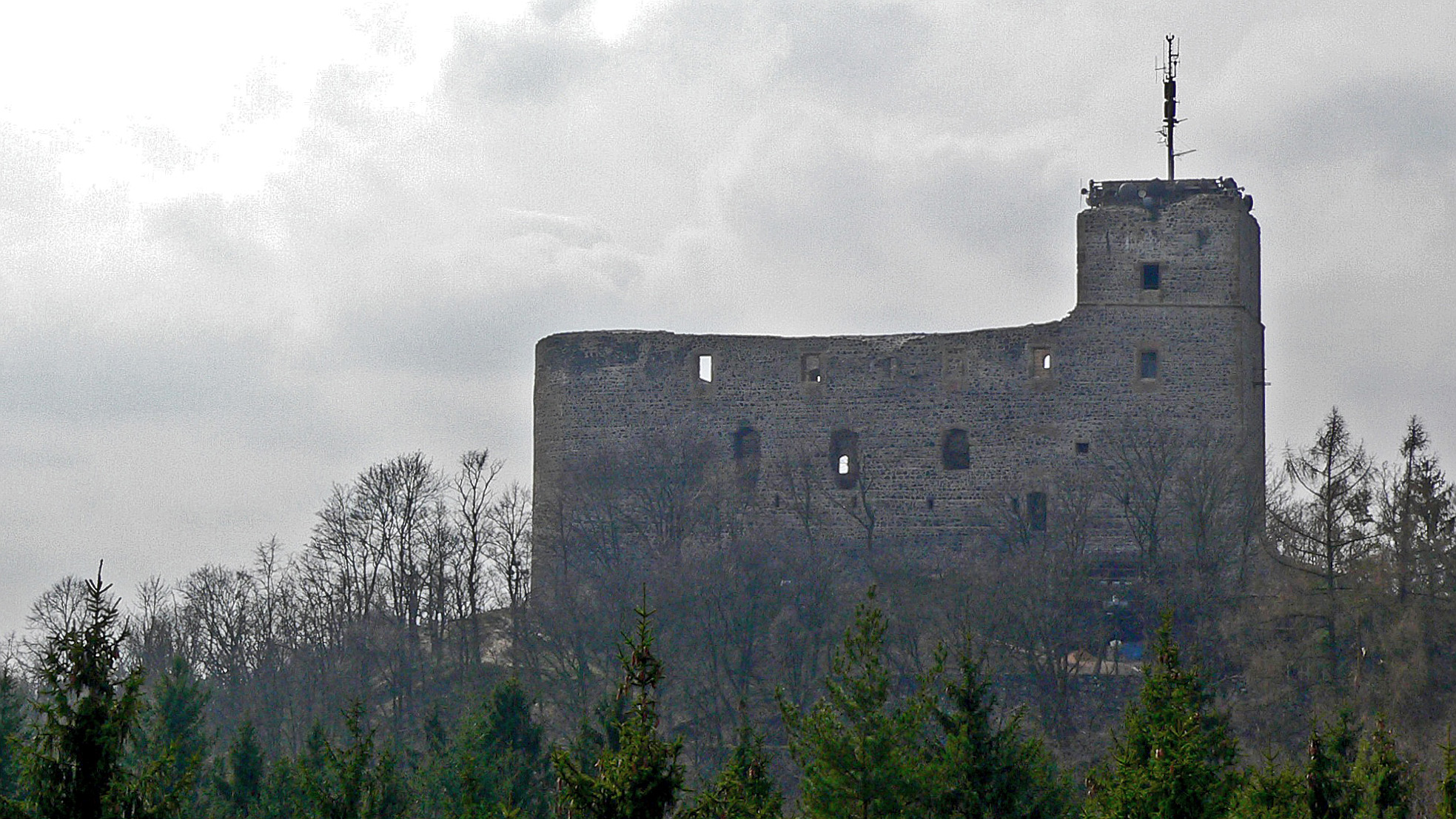
Castle Radyně

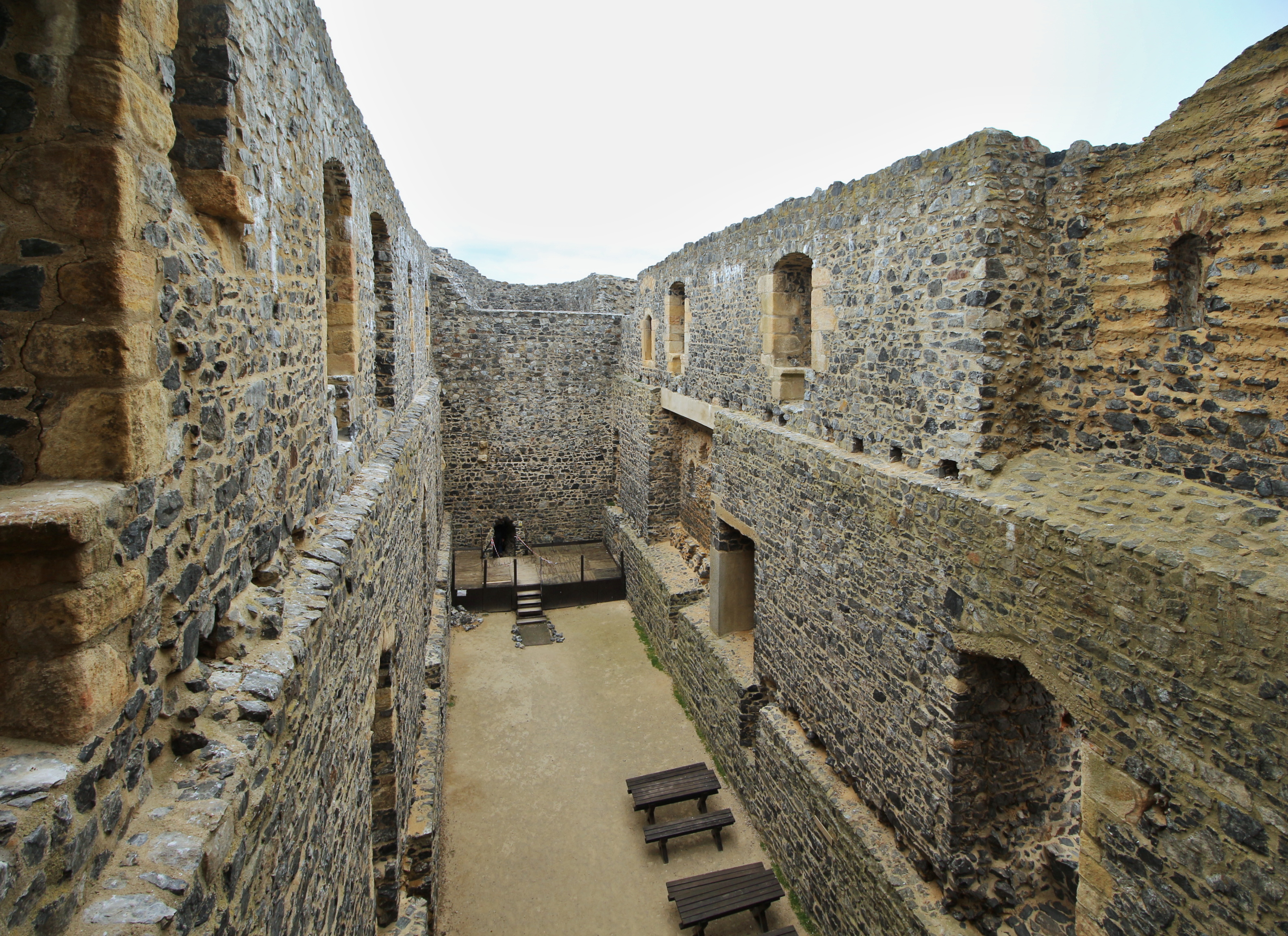
Inside of castles palace

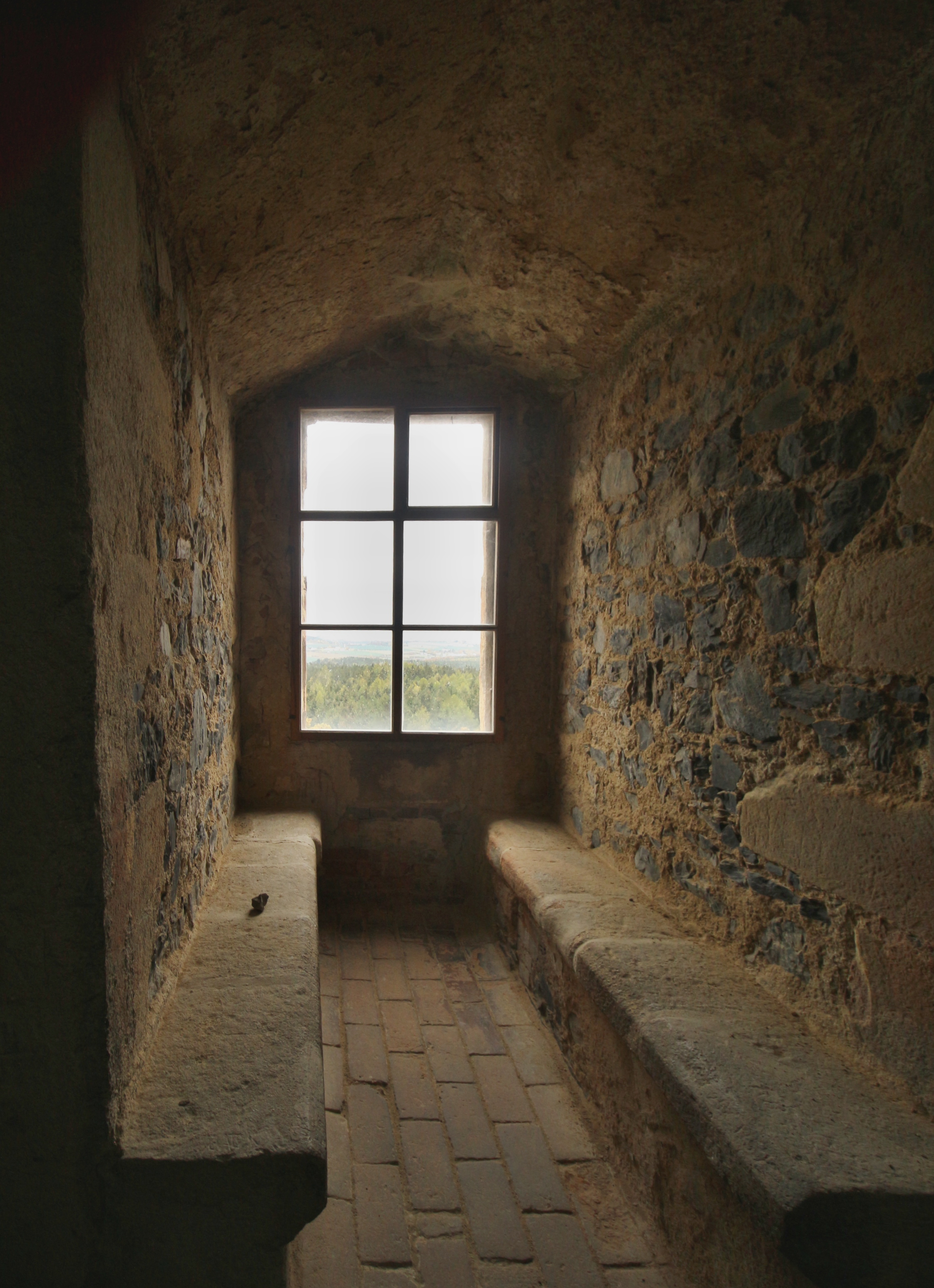
Window with bench in a square tower

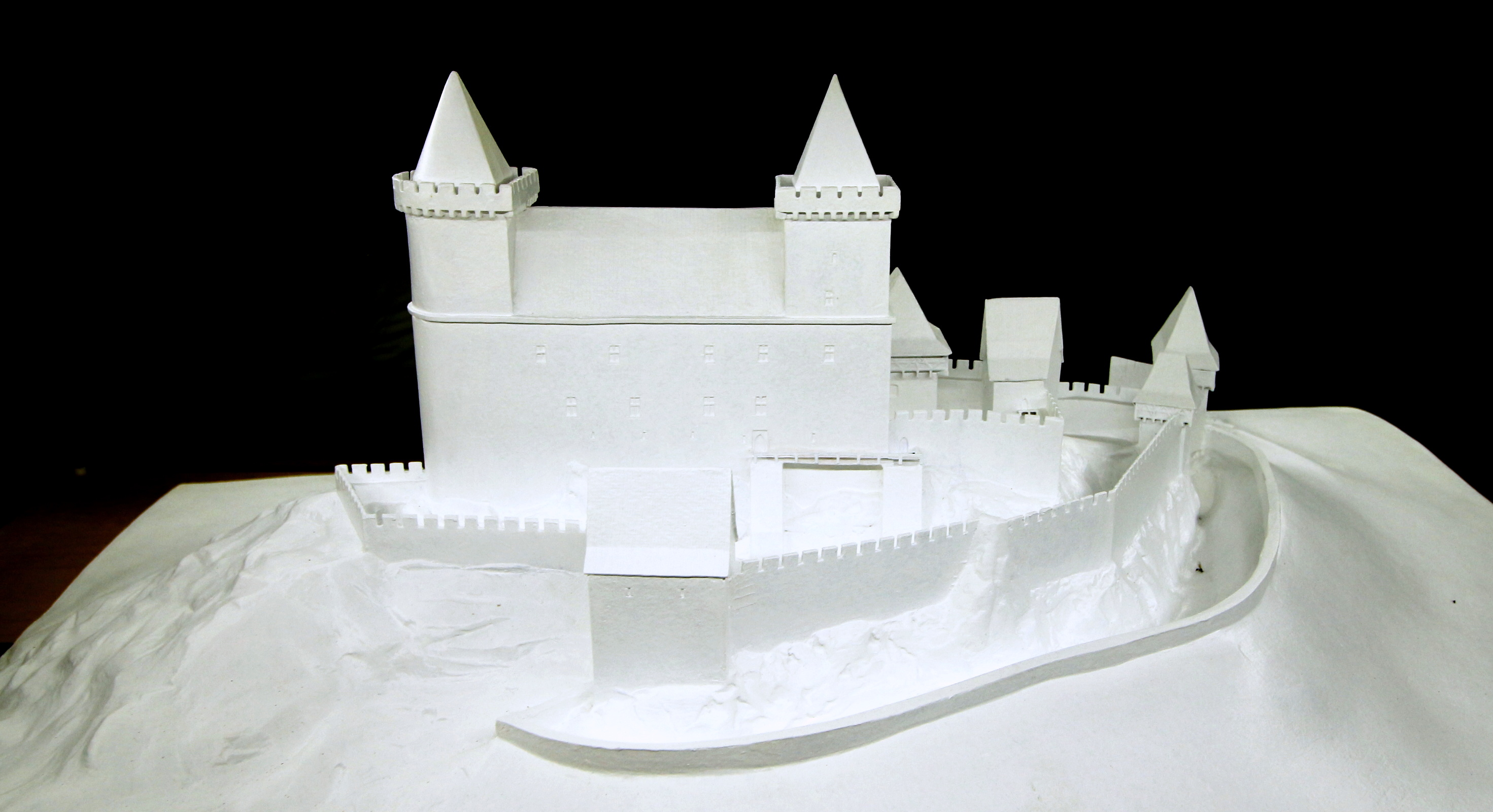
Modell of Castle from medieval times

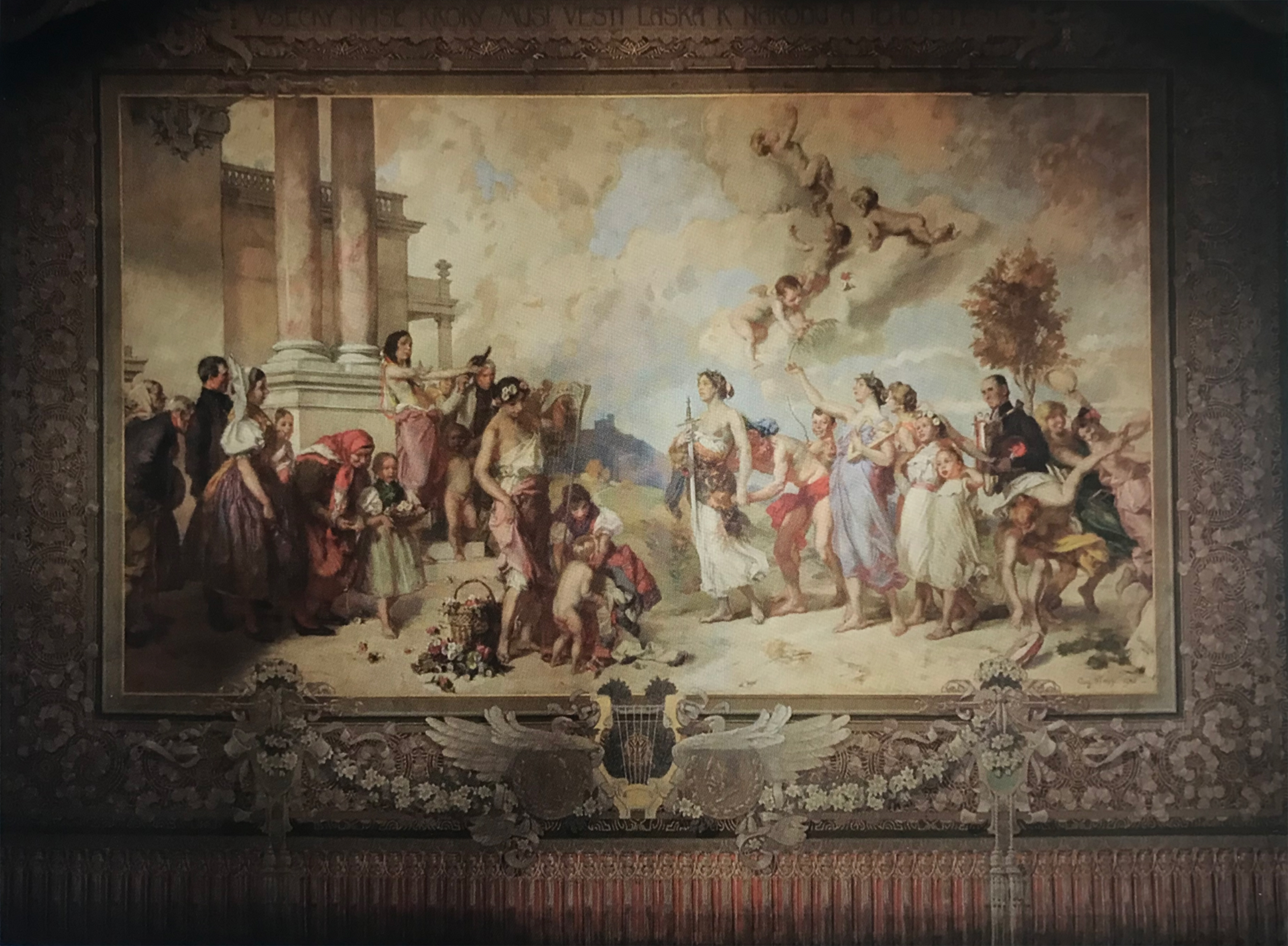
Castle Radyně on the Festive Curtain of Pilsener Theatre, painted by Augustin Němejc

== See also ==
- List of castles in the Plzeň Region
