= Palace Gardens Below Prague Castle =

- Palácové zahrady pod Pražským hradem
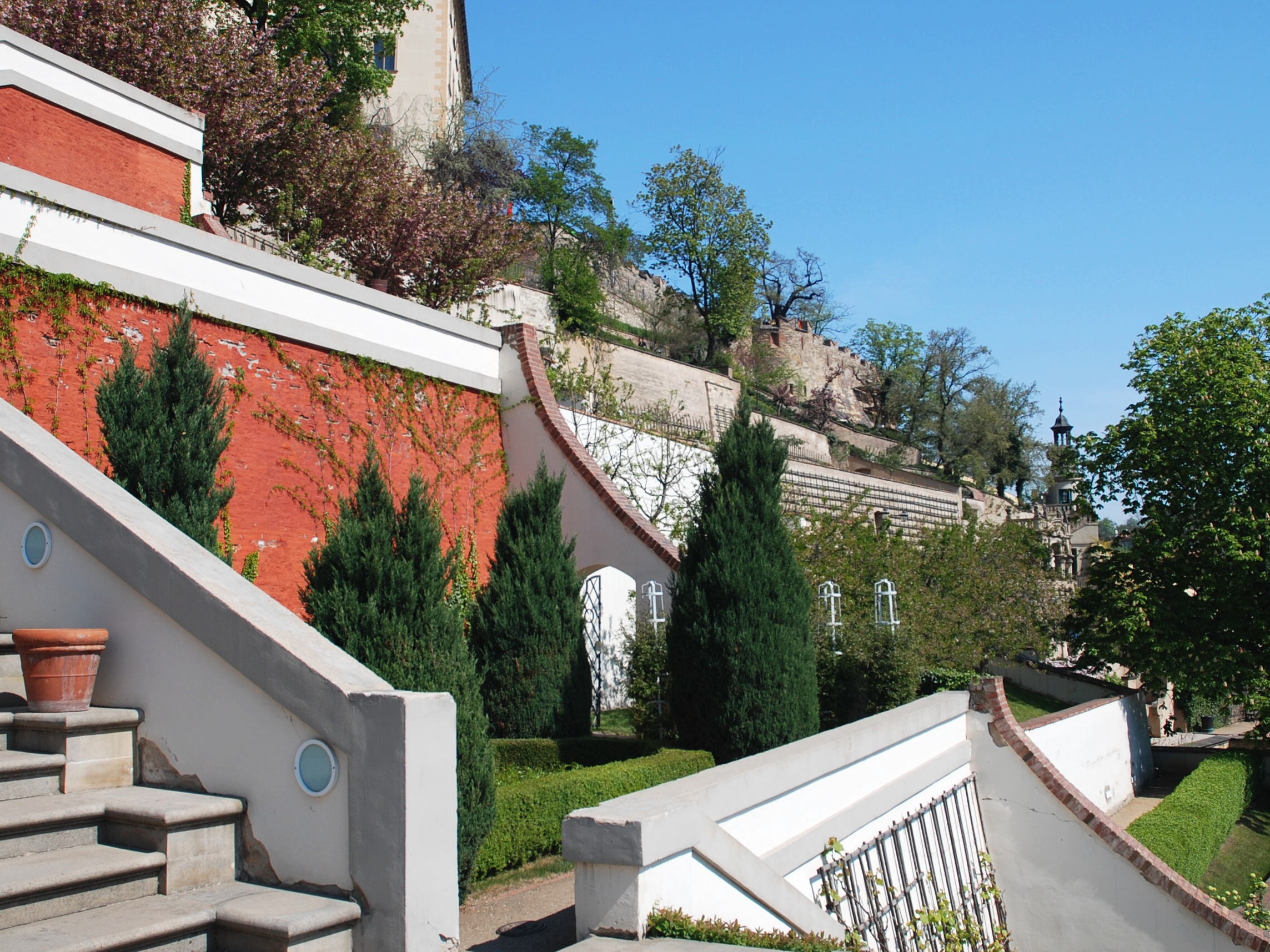
- The garden in 2007
- Interactive map of Palace Gardens Below Prague Castle
- Location: Malá Strana, Prague, Czech Republic
- Coordinates: 50°5′27.75″N 14°24′16.9″E

The Palace Gardens Below Prague Castle (Czech: Palácové zahrady pod Pražským hradem) are located in Malá Strana, Prague, Czech Republic. They consist of six gardens adjacent to several nobility palaces along Valdštejnská street, stretching on the hillside up to the walls of Prague Castle.

== Photo gallery ==
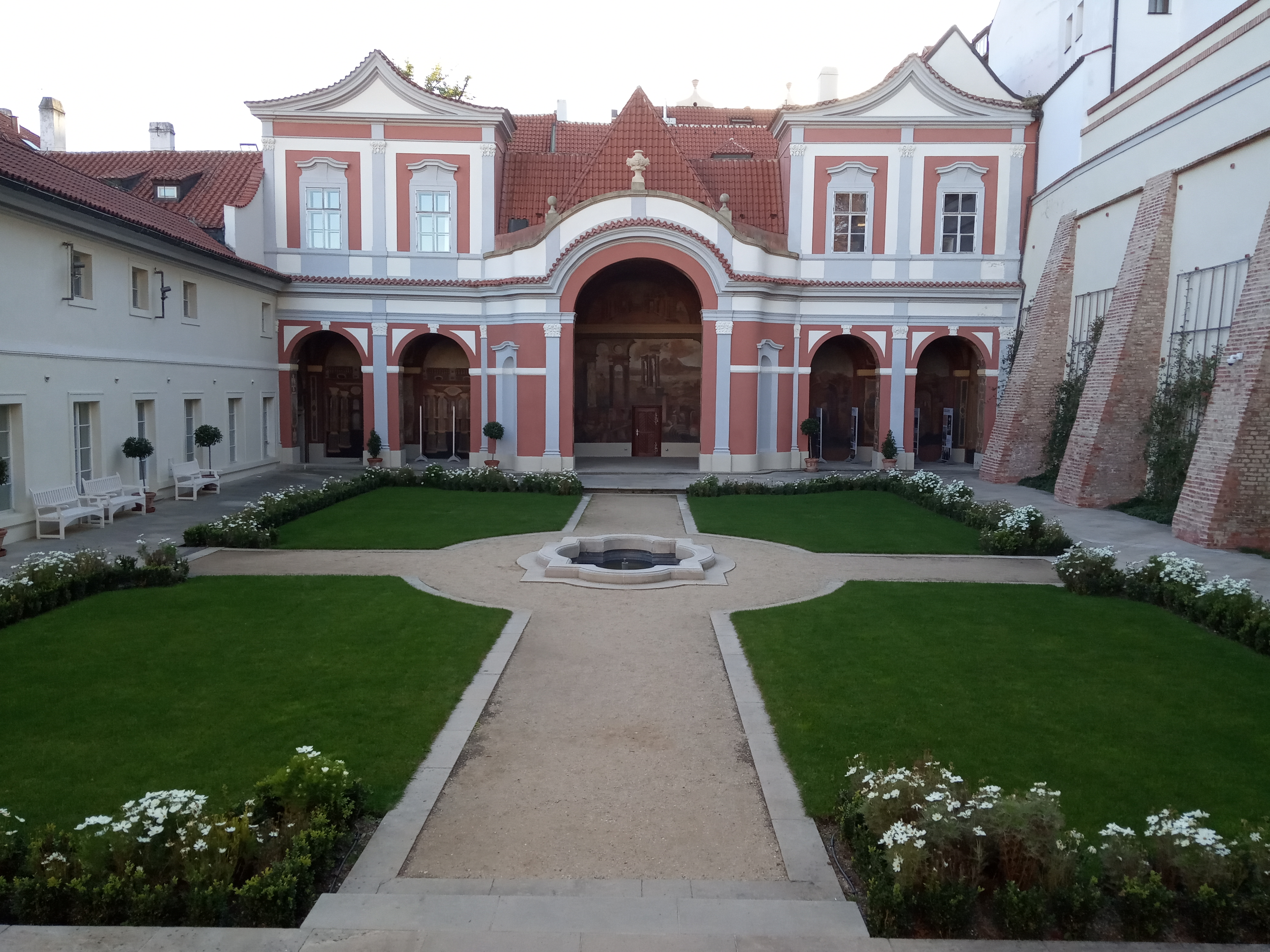
Ledebour garden - parterre with sala terrena

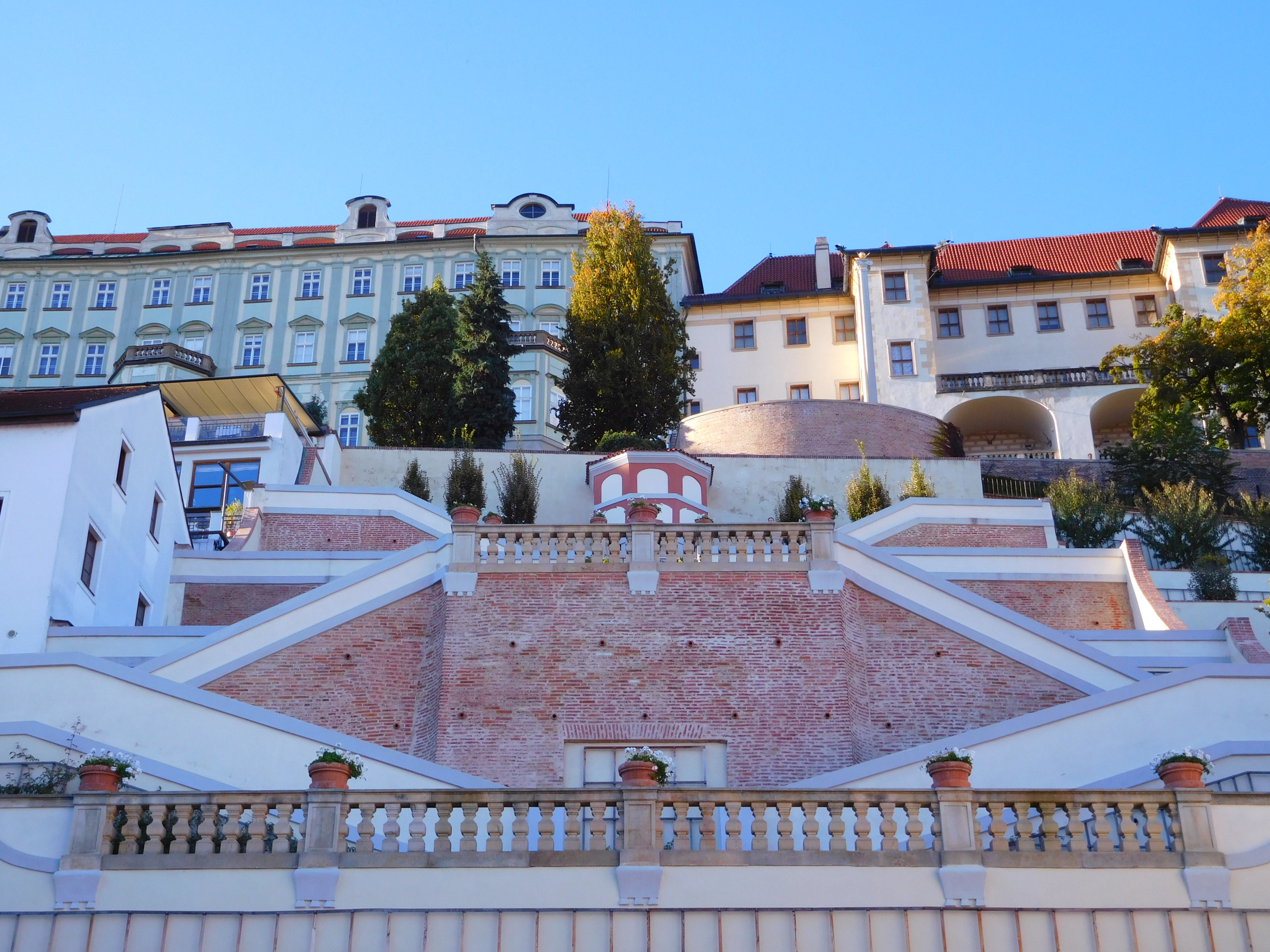
Ledebour garden - terraces adjacent to the Prague castle

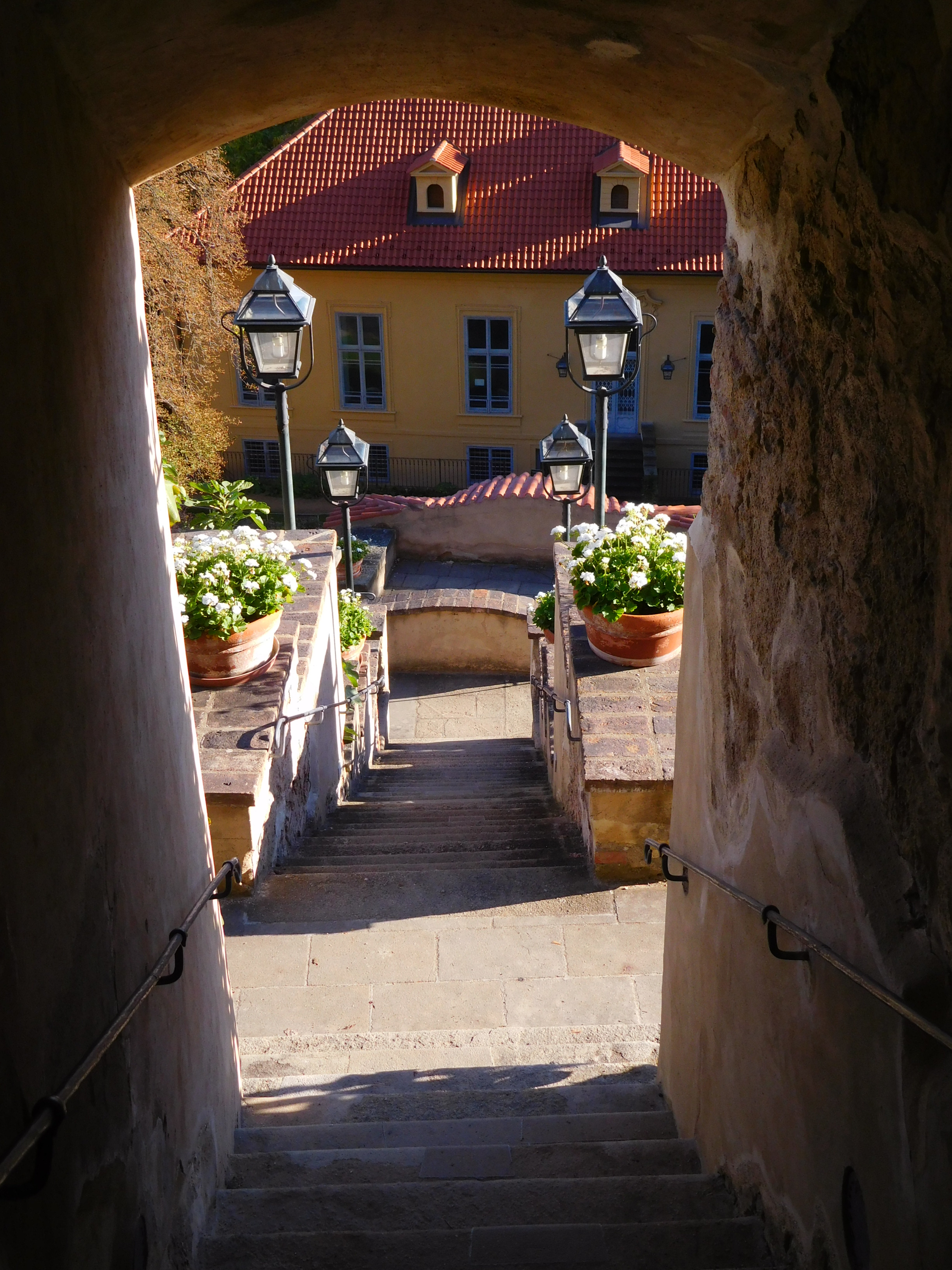
Large Pálffy garden - view from the central staircase

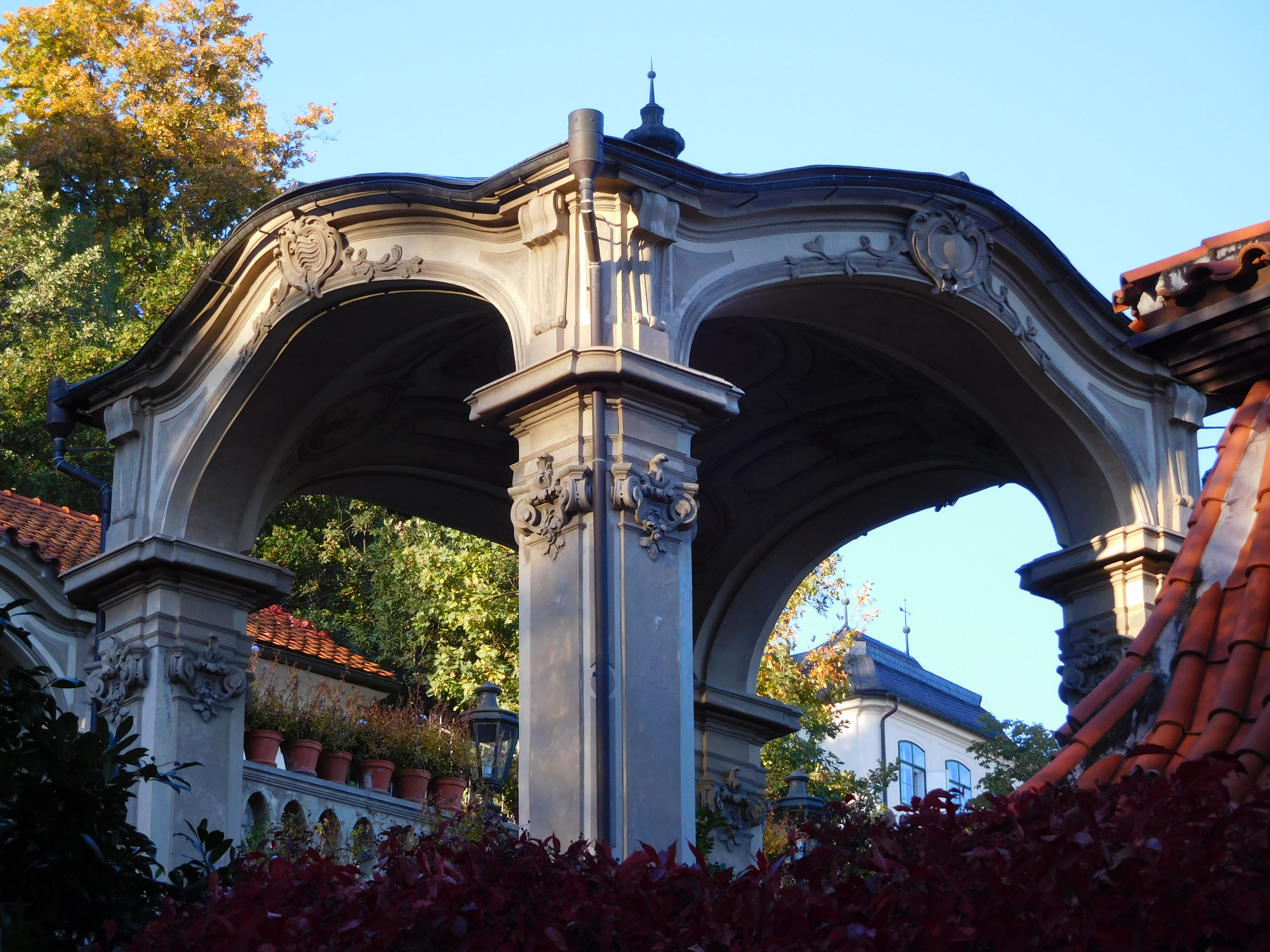
Gloriette in Small Fürstenberg garden

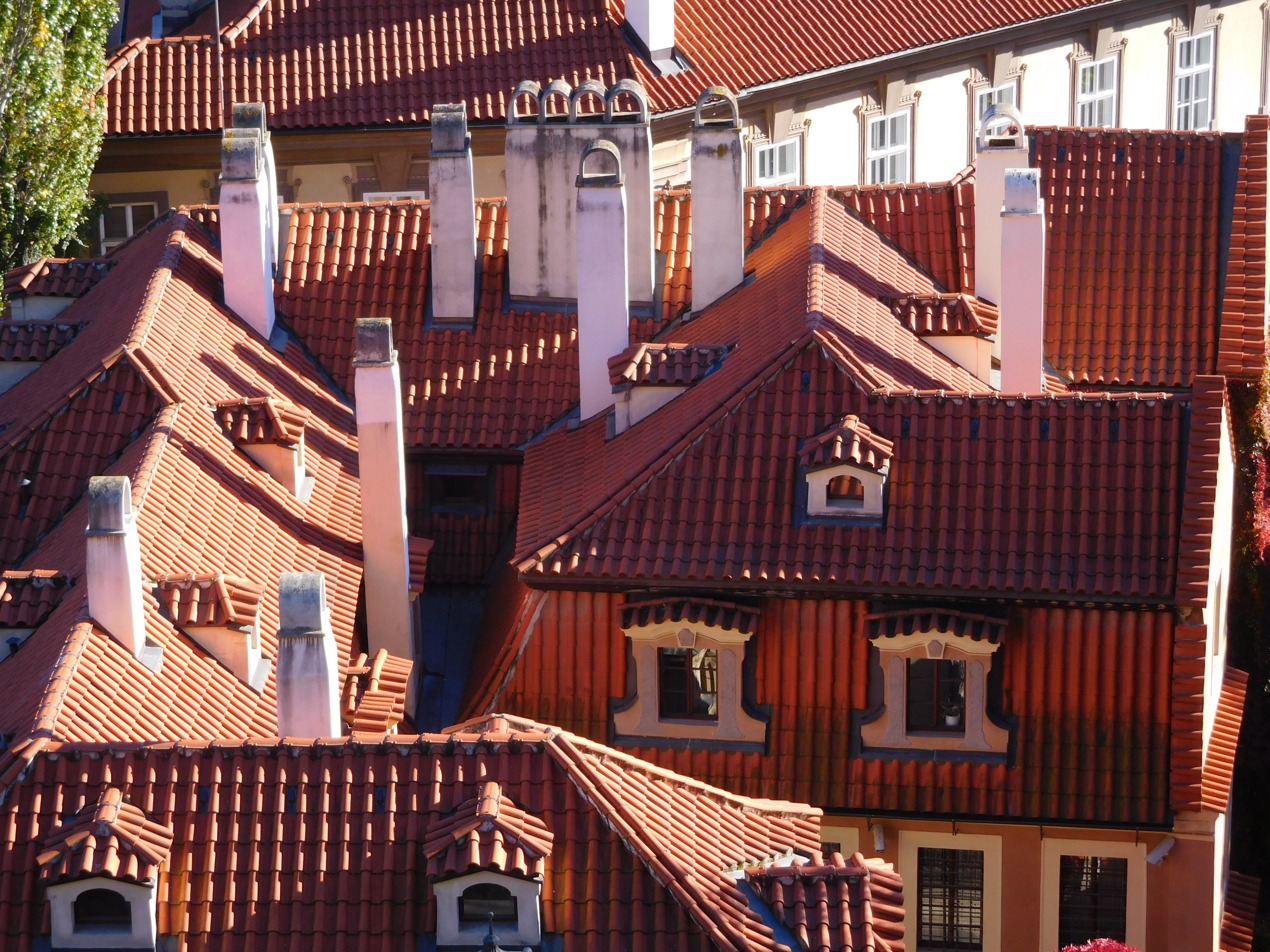
View onto characteristic Monk and Nun tile roof of Lesser Town from Small Fürstenberg garden

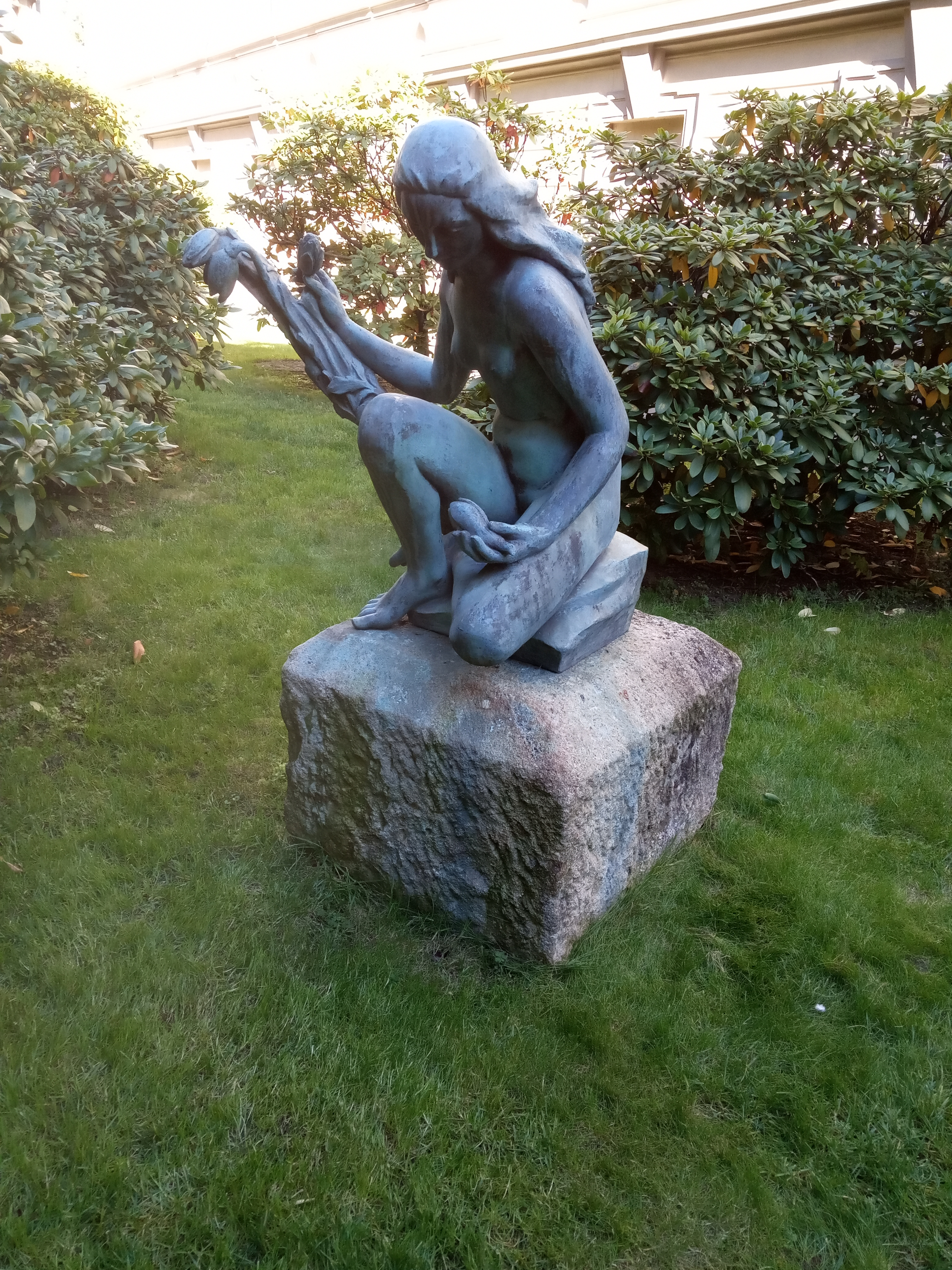
Statue of a girl in the entrance courtyard of the gardens
