= General Land Centennial Exhibition =

1891 World's fair

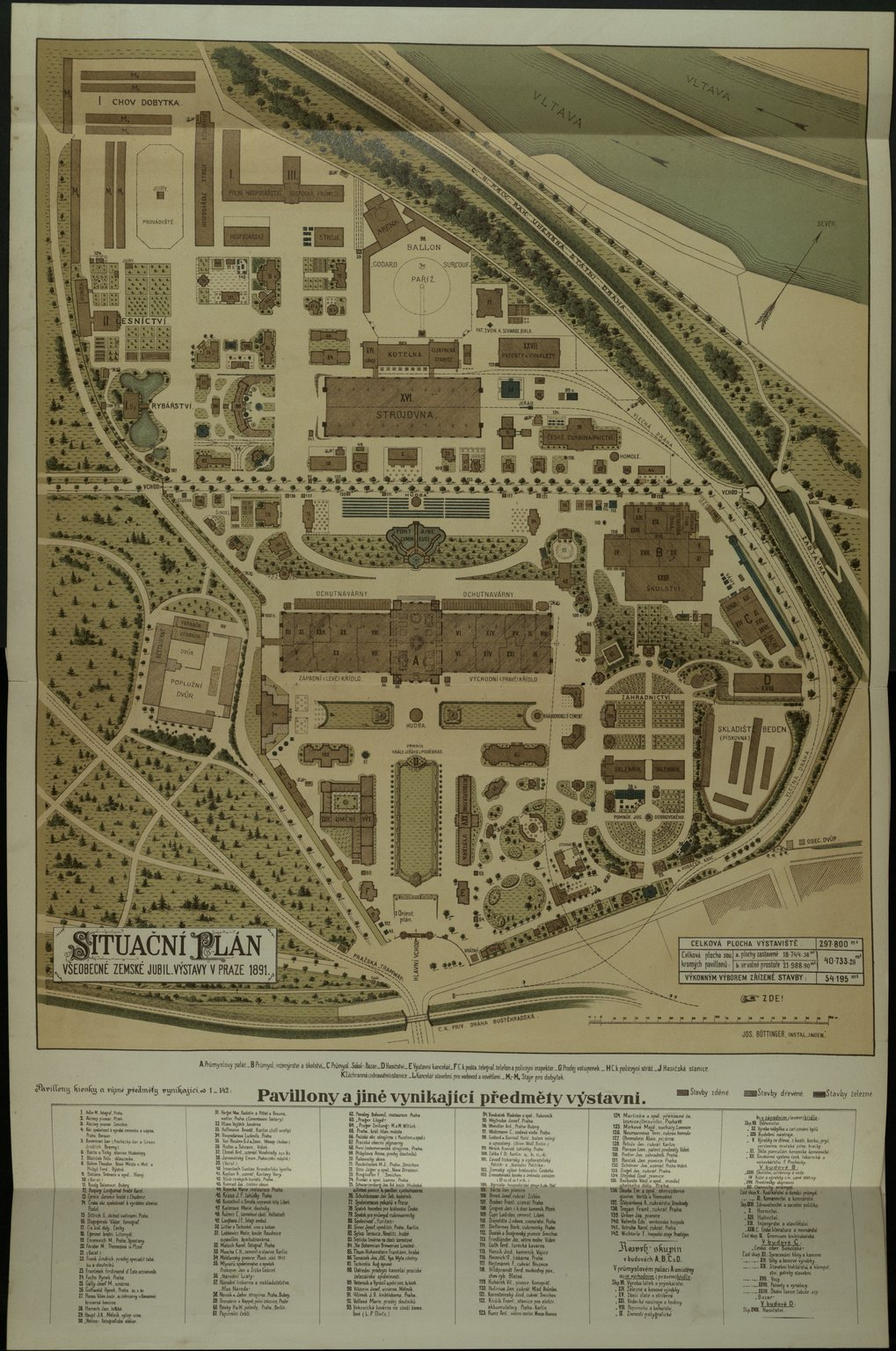
- Site plan

Overview
- BIE-class: Unrecognized exposition
- Name: General Land Centennial Exhibition
- Building(s): Petřín Lookout Tower
- Visitors: 2,500,000

Timeline
- Opening: 15 May 1891
- Closure: 18 October 1891

expositions
- Previous: Exposition Universelle (1889) in Paris
- Next: World's Columbian Exposition in Chicago

Simultaneous
- Other: International Electrotechnical Exhibition

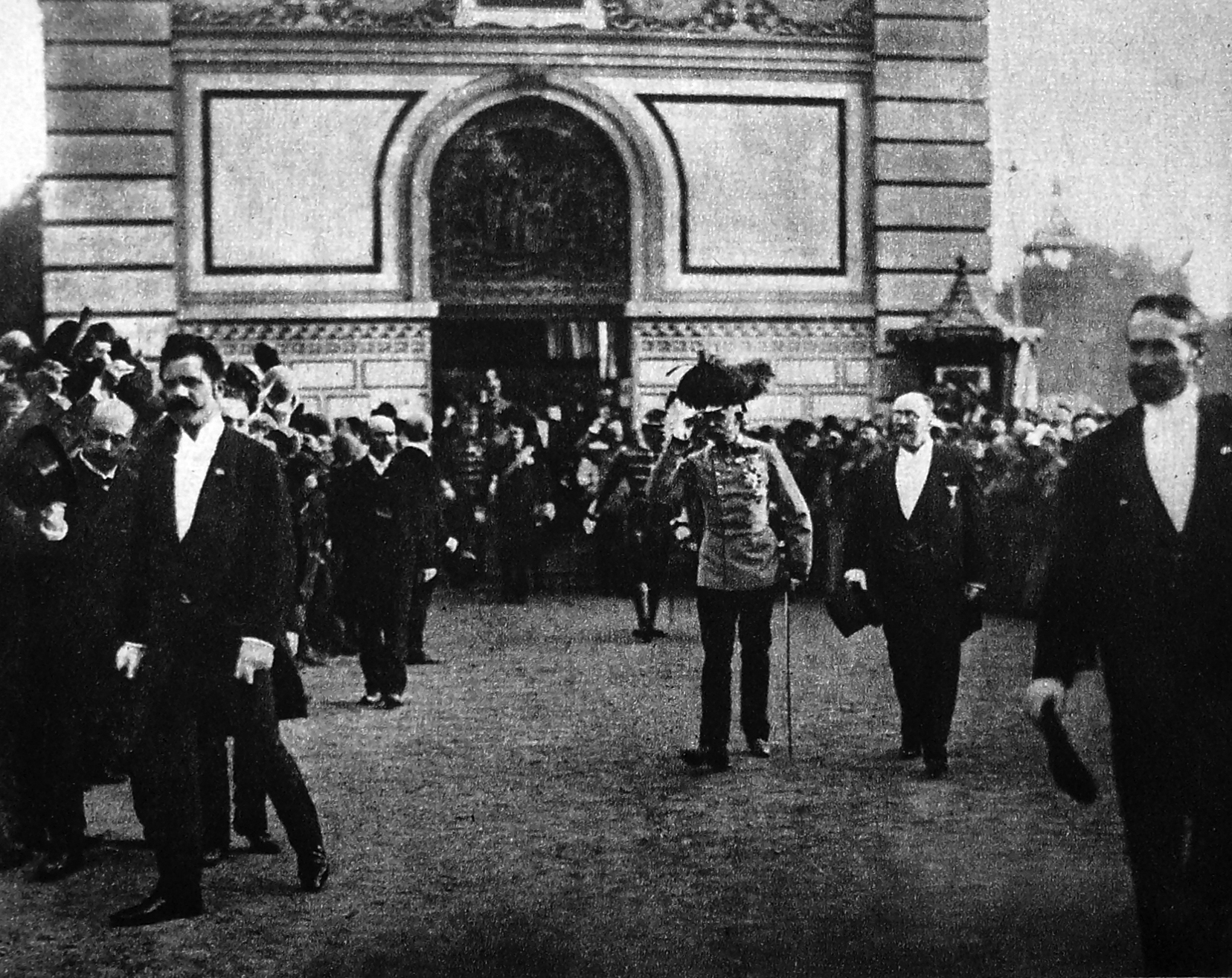
Rudolf Bruner-Dvořák: Franz Joseph I of Austria

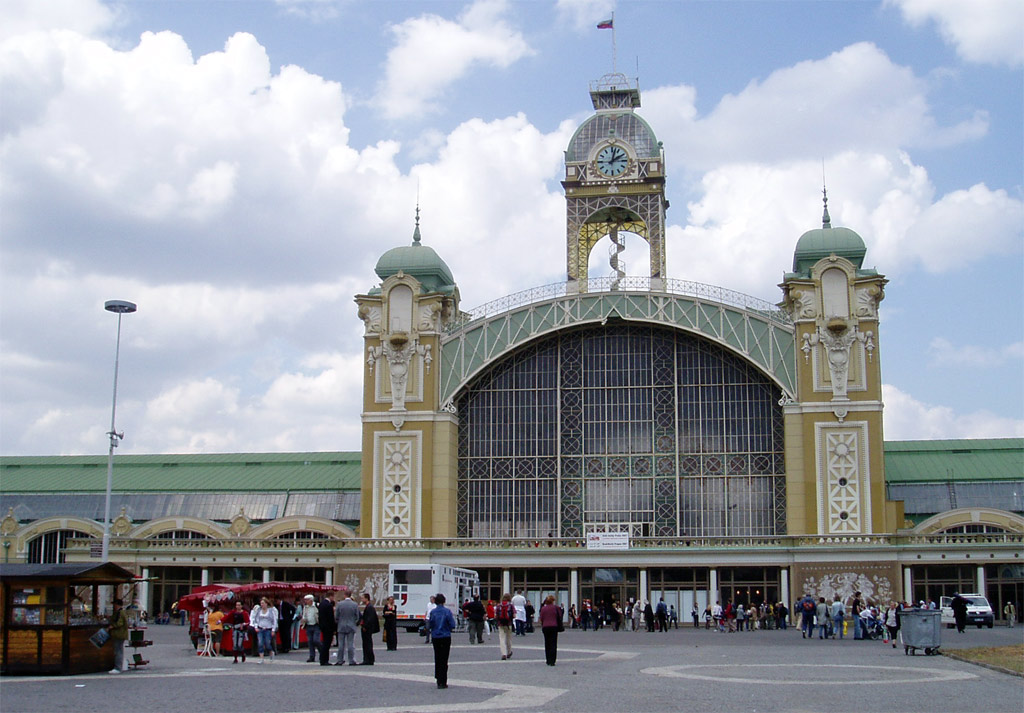
Průmyslový palace in 2007

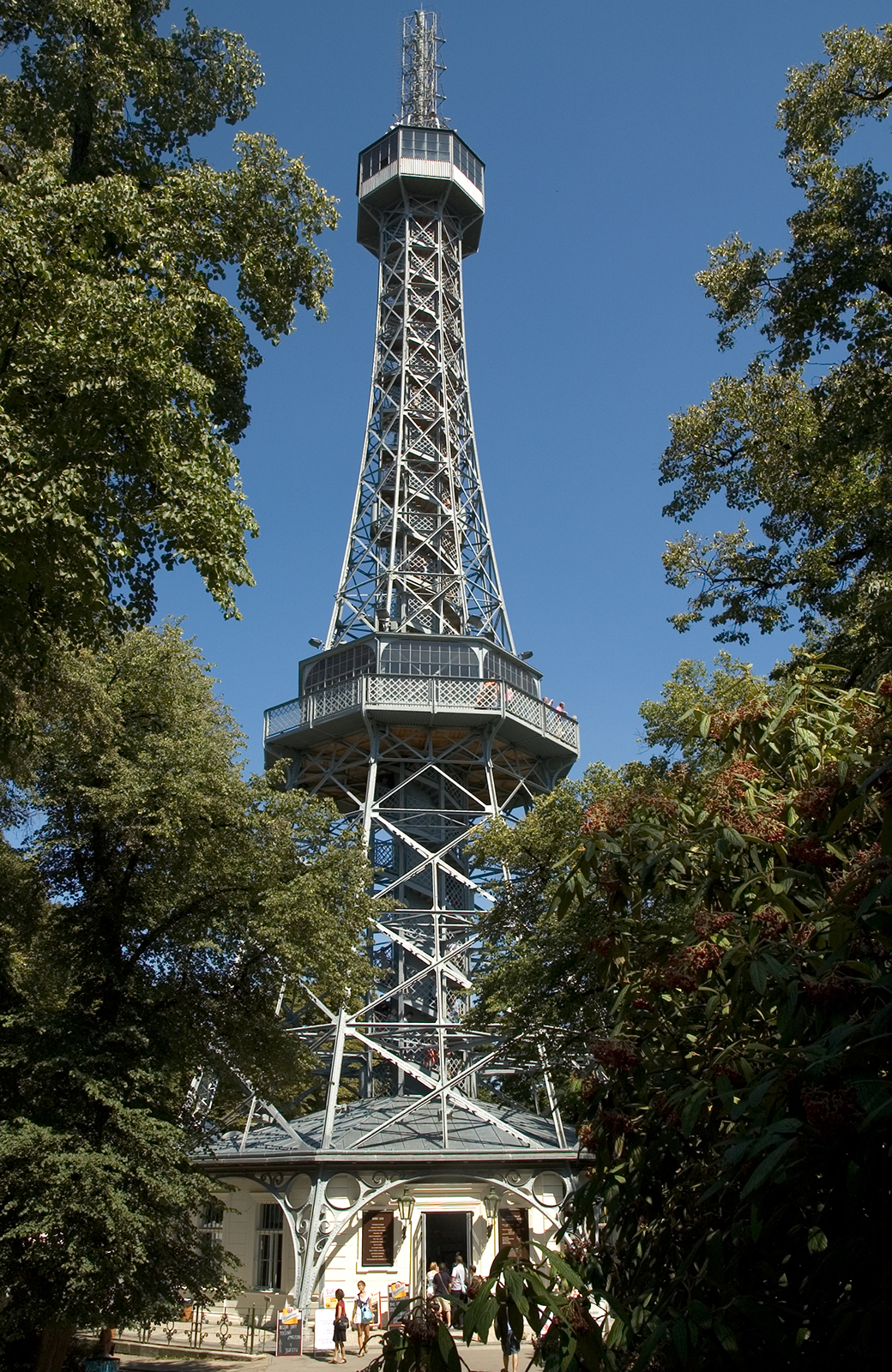
Petřín Tower

The General Land Centennial Exhibition was a World's fair held in 1891 in Prague, then in the Austria-Hungarian Empire.

Many buildings were erected for this exposition, including the Průmyslový palác (Industrial Palace) and the Křižík's light fountain at Výstaviště Praha.

== Summary ==
Taking place towards the end of the Austro-Hungarian Empire, this exhibition was a demonstration of what was to soon become Czechoslovakia's desire for independence. Its date marked 100 years since the first industrial exhibition held in 1791 in Prague's Clementinum when Prague was part of the Habsburg monarchy. The German population in Prague attempted to move the 1891 expo to the following year, when it could not be used to mark the century. When the Exhibition was held nonetheless, they largely boycotted it.

Sometimes known as the Prague Jubilee Exhibition the main site for the fair is now the Prague Exhibition Grounds close to Stromovka Park. The biggest building was the Průmyslový palace designed by Bedřich Münzberger.

== Opening ==
The fair was opened on 15 May 1891 by Archduke Karl Ludwig and attended by government ministers, the governor Count Franz Thun and Prince George Lobkowicz. Emperor Franz Josef I did not attend the opening ceremony, but visited the fair later. The Křižík's light fountain was also introduced during the Exhibition.

== Art ==
Paintings shown included works by Emanuel Krescenc Liška and Hopeless Love by Augustin Němejc which won a second prize.

== Legacy ==
Many buildings from the fair still exist including the Art Nouveau Hanau Pavilion at Letná and a 60-meter tall Petřín Lookout Tower on top of the Petřín hill. The Křižík's light fountain was reconstructed recently and is still operational.

== Gallery ==
Main entrance gate

Industrial Palace

Pavilion of the Hanau ironworks

Pavilion of the City of Prague

Pavilion of the Club of Czech Tourists, now the mirror maze on Petřín

Pavilion of Czech paper manufacturers

Preceded by Országos Nőipari Kiállitás (1881) (Budapest)	World's Fairs in Austria-Hungary; 1891	Succeeded by Powszechna Wystawa Krajowa (1894) (Lviv)
