= Petřín =

Hill in Prague, Czech Republic

Coordinates: 50°05′01″N 14°23′43″E

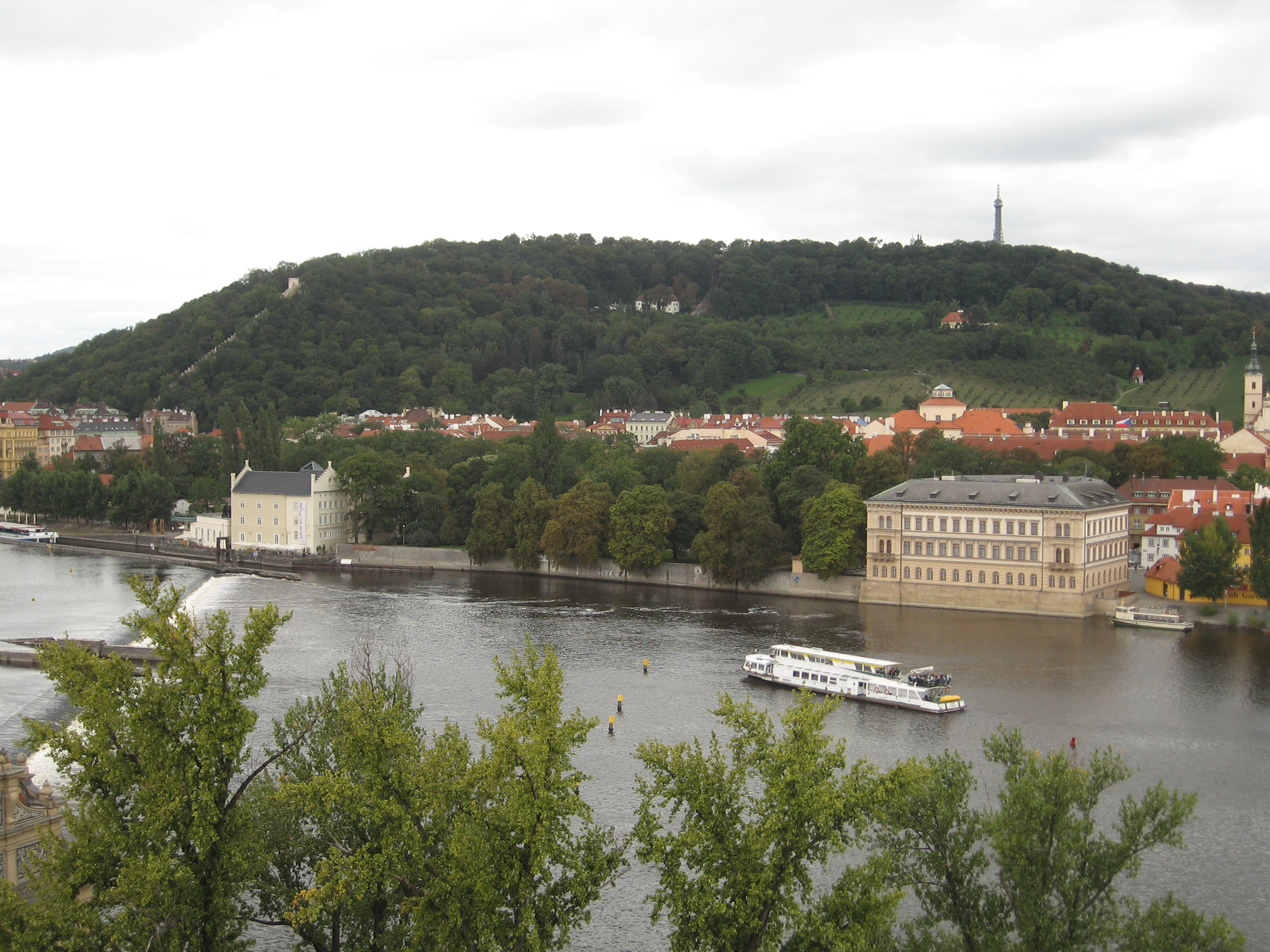
Petřín as seen from the Old Town Bridge Tower

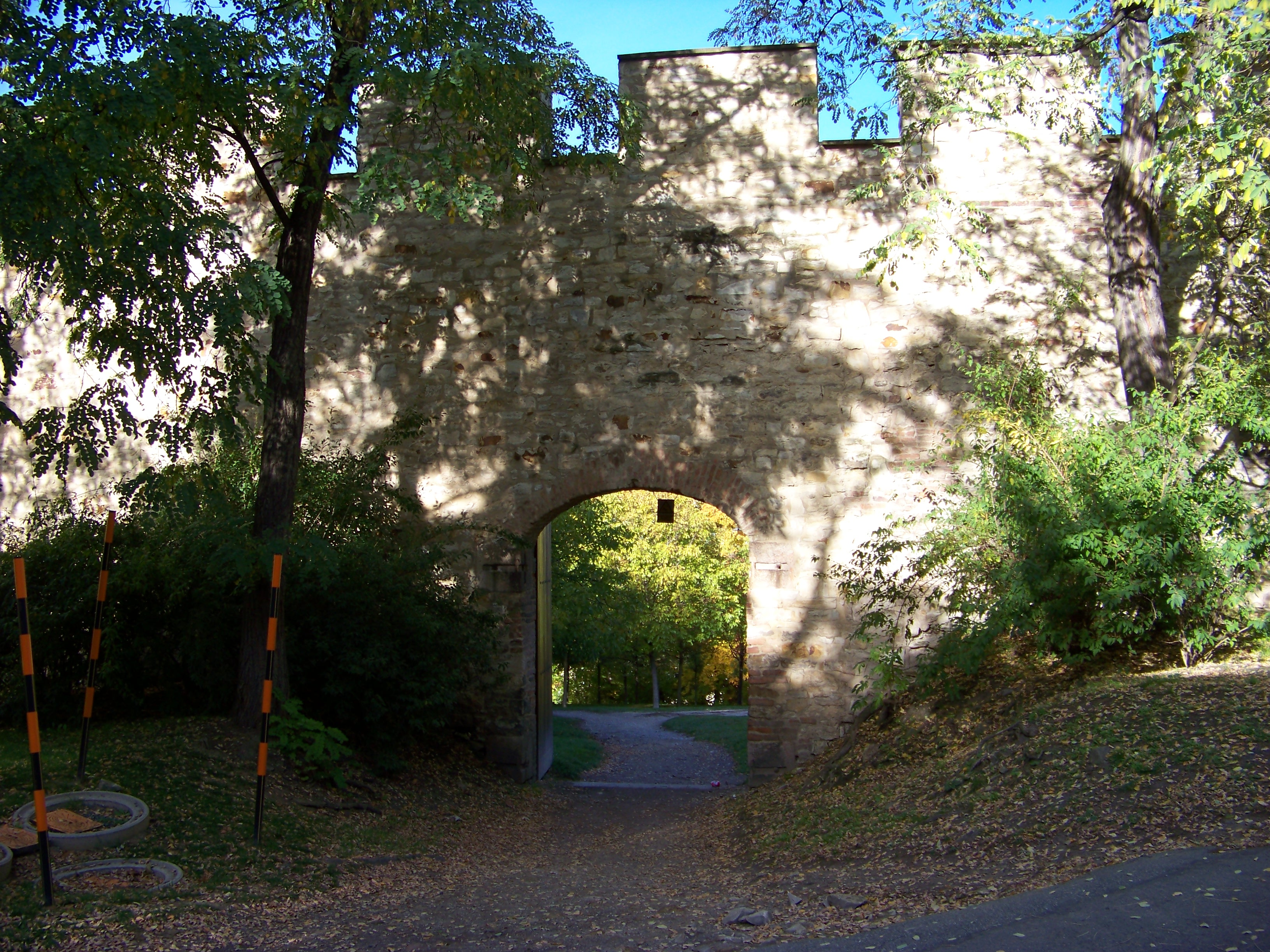
Hunger Wall at Petřín hill

Petřín (Czech pronunciation: [ˈpɛtr̝̊iːn]) is a hill in the centre of Prague, Czech Republic. It rises 327 m above sea level and some 130 m above the left bank of the Vltava River. The hill, almost entirely covered with parks, is a favorite recreational area for the inhabitants of Prague. The hill (known in German as Laurenziberg) is featured prominently in Franz Kafka's early short story "Description of a Struggle" and briefly in Milan Kundera's novel The Unbearable Lightness of Being.

The chronicler Cosmas describes Petřín as a very rocky place, alleging that the hill is called Petřín because of the large number of rocks (Latin: petra). Since ancient times, stones were dug and were used to construct buildings in Prague. A medieval defensive wall, known as the Hunger Wall, was built on Petřín Hill during 1360 - 1362 by the order of the king of Bohemia, Charles IV. The Petřín Lookout Tower, which strongly resembles the Eiffel Tower, was built atop the hill in 1891. Other sights include the Rose Garden, Mirror Maze, the Cathedral of Saint Lawrence, and St Michael's Church.

The summit of the hill is linked to Prague's Malá Strana district by the Petřín funicular, a funicular railway that first operated in 1891.

== Main sights ==
- Petřín lookout tower
- Petřín funicular
- Hunger Wall
- Mirror Maze
- Rose Garden
- Štefánik's Observatory
- Strahov Stadium
- St Lawrence Cathedral
- St. Michael the Archangel Church (wooden church from the second half of the 17th century in Boyko style, transferred from Subcarpathian Ruthenia in 1929)
- Memorial to the Victims of Communism
