= Old Catholic Church of the Czech Republic =

Christian denomination

- Cathedral of St Lawrence, Prague, mother church of the Old Catholic Church in Czech Republic
- Classification: Catholic
- Theology: Ultrajectine
- Governance: Episcopal
- Leader: Benedikt Pavel Stránský
- Associations: International Old Catholic Bishops' Conference
- Region: Czech Republic
- Headquarters: Prague
- Separated from: Catholic Church
- Congregations: 16
- Members: 2,700 (2006)
- Ministers: 22

The Old Catholic Church of the Czech Republic (Czech: Starokatolická církev v České republice) consists of the Czech parishes in full communion with the Union of Utrecht of the Old Catholic Churches. The church is also a member of the National Ecumenical Council, the World Council of Churches and the Conference of European Churches. The official publication of the community is Communio.

== History ==
In 1991, Bishop Dušan Hejbal was elected to head the church. He was consecrated on September 27, 1997. In 2003, under his leadership, the church began ordaining women to the diaconate. He retired in 2015 and was succeeded by Benedikt Pavel Stránský in 2016.

In the 2021 census, 672 Czech citizens identified themselves as adherents of the Old Catholic Church of the Czech Republic.

== Bishops ==
The following bishops have governed the Old Catholic Church in Czechoslovakia and the Czech Republic.

- Aloisa Paszka (Alois Paszek, 1924-1946)
- Augustin Podolak (1968-1972)
- Jan Heger (1972-1991)
- Dušan Hejbal (1997-2015; elected in 1991 but not consecrated until 1997)
- Benedikt Pavel Stránský (2016–present)
