= Hunger Wall =

Defensive wall in Prague, Czech Republic

Coordinates: 50.083°N 14.395°E

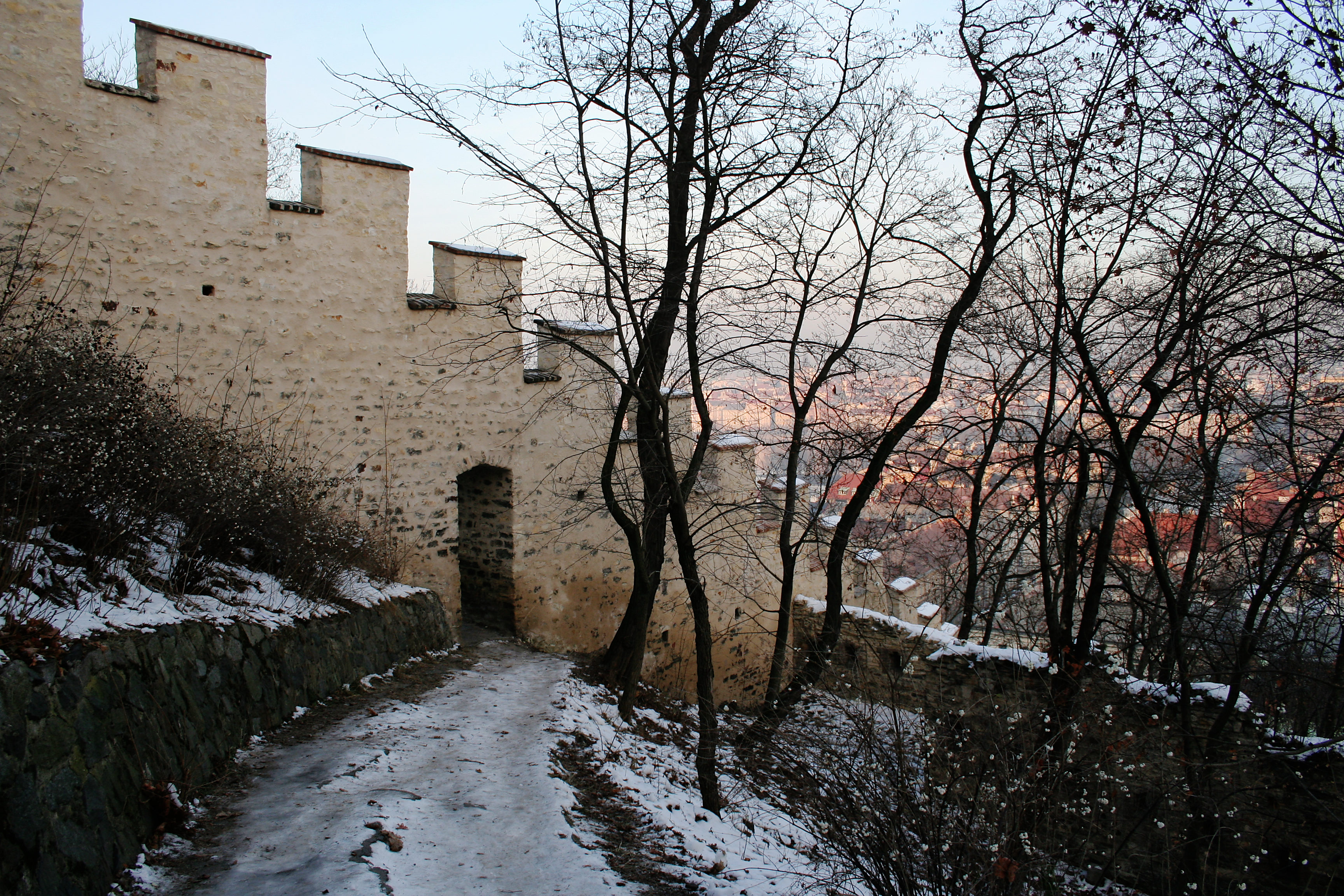
The wall above Újezd in Malá Strana

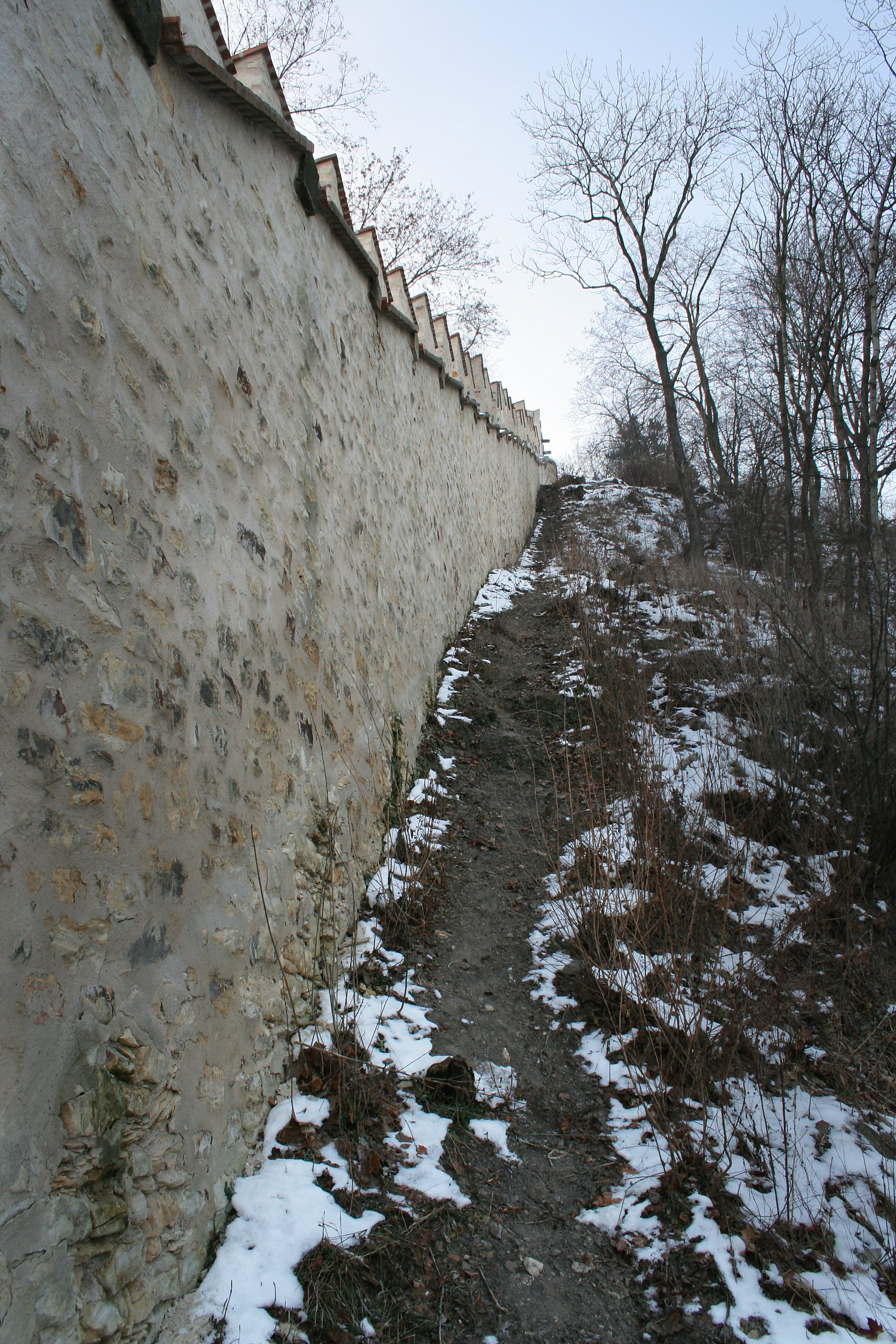
The wall on Petřín

The Hunger Wall (Czech: Hladová zeď) is a medieval defensive wall of the Lesser Town of Prague, today's Czech Republic. It was built on Petřín Hill between 1360 and 1362 by order of Charles IV.

Marl from quarries on Petřín Hill was used as construction material. The purpose of the construction was to strengthen the fortifications of Prague Castle and Malá Strana against any attack from the west or south. Originally the wall was 4 to 4.5 metres high and 1.8 metres wide and was equipped with battlements and (probably) eight bastions.

The wall was repaired in 1624, further strengthened in the middle of 18th century and repaired or modified several times later (in modern era in 1923-25 and 1975). One of preserved bastions serves as a base for the dome of Štefánik Observatory.

A well preserved part of the wall may also be found in the interior yard of the 19th-century house in Plaská Street No.8.

== The name and associated myths ==
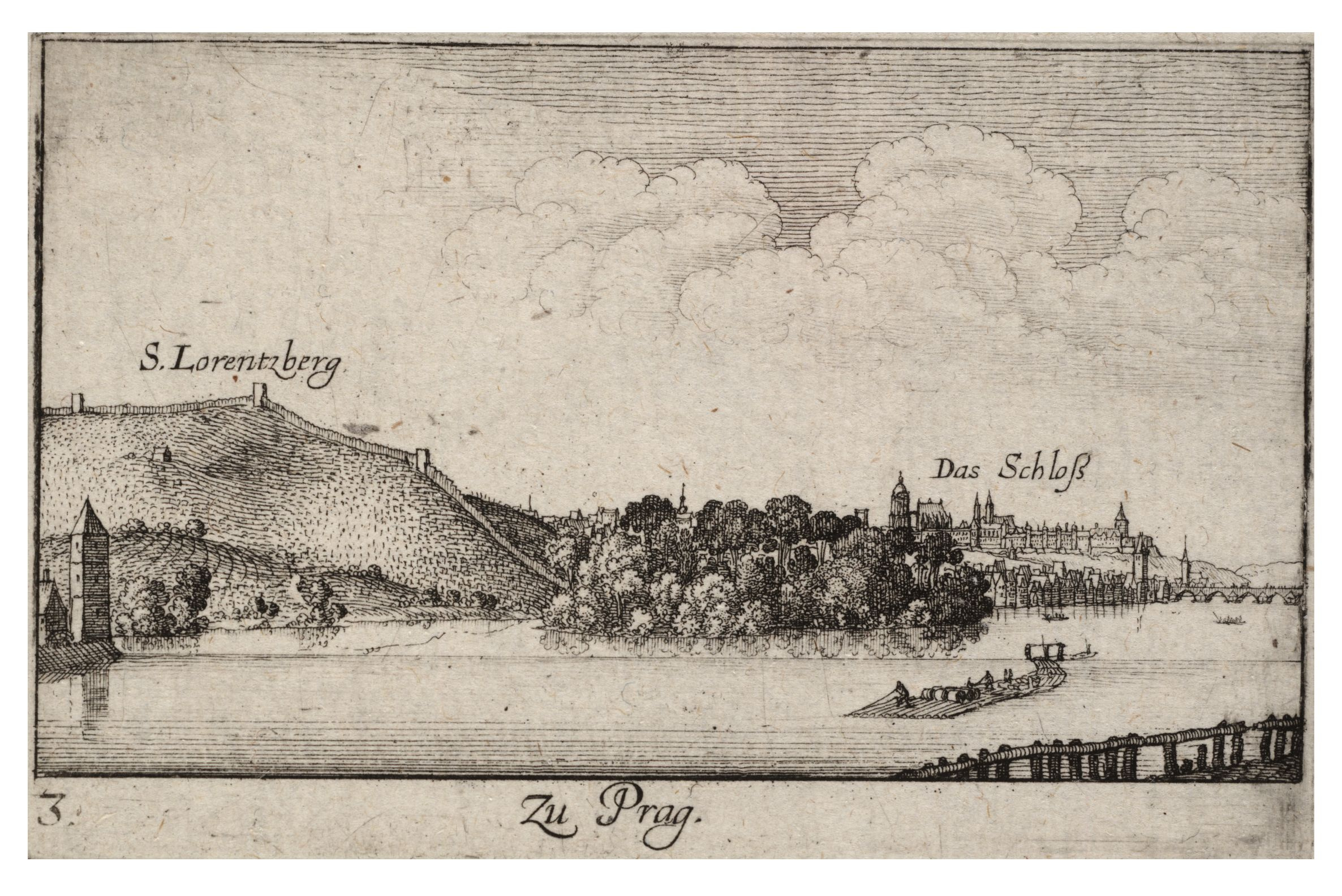
View at the Prague Castle (on the right) and Petřín Hill with Hunger Wall by Václav Hollar from the 17th century

The wall was originally called Zubatá (toothed) or Chlebová (built for bread). The adjective Hladová (hungry) appeared after a 1361 famine, when the construction works on the wall provided livelihood for the city's poor. According to myth, the purpose of the wall was not strategic but to employ and thus feed the poor. Another myth, recorded in writings of Václav Hájek z Libočan or Bohuslav Balbín, is that the Emperor Charles IV himself worked on the wall several hours every day "to help his beloved people".

== Sources ==
- Julius Košnář: Staropražské pověsti a legendy (= Myths and legends from old Prague). Vincentinum, Praha 1933, Chapter: O Hladové zdi, p. 268 (Czech, available online).
- Hladová zeď on turistika.cz (in Czech)
- Hladová zeď on praguecityline.cz (in Czech)
