= Malá Strana =

Neighborhood of Prague, Czechia

- Cadastral Area of Prague
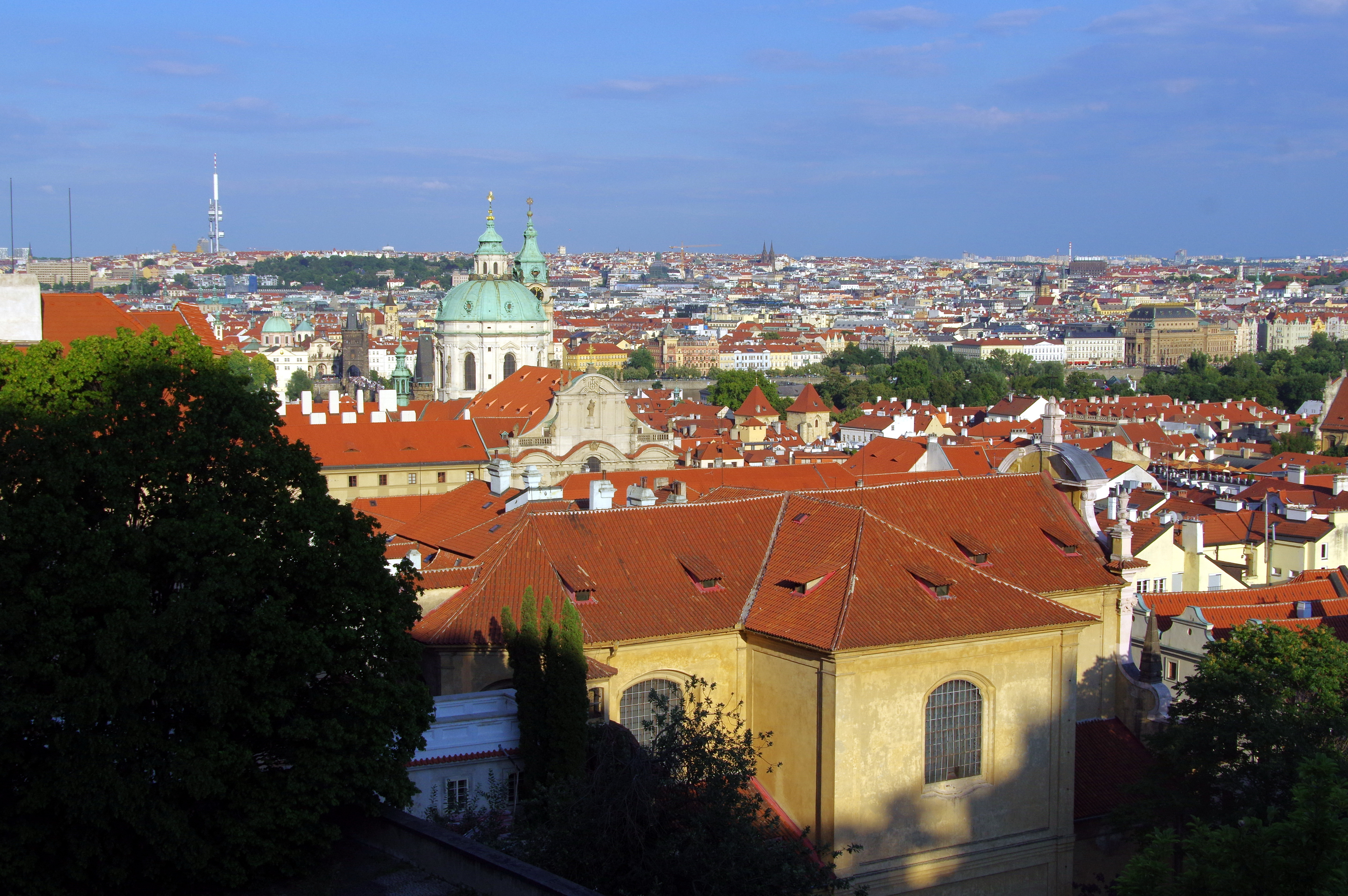
- View of Malá Strana from Prague Castle

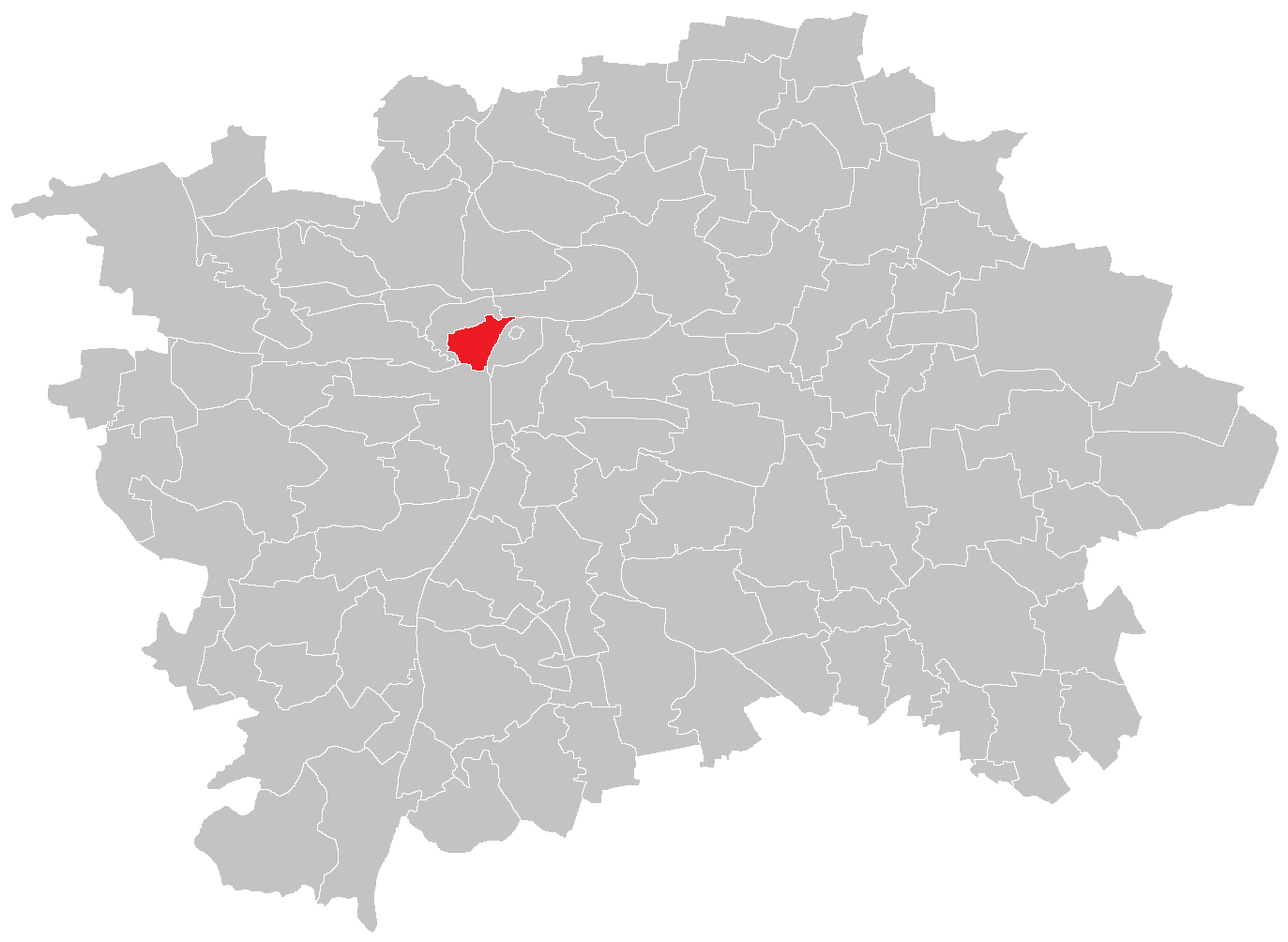
- Location of Malá Strana in Prague
- Coordinates: 50°05′17″N 14°24′14″E
- Country: Czech Republic
- Region: Prague
- District: Prague 1, Prague 5

Area
  - Total: 1.37 km^{2} (0.53 sq mi)

Population (2021)
  - Total: 4,584
  - Density: 3,350/km^{2} (8,670/sq mi)
- Time zone: UTC+1 (CET)
  - Summer (DST): UTC+2 (CEST)
- Postal code: 110 00, 150 00

Malá Strana (Czech for "Little Side (of the River)", German: Prager Kleinseite) or historically Menší Město pražské (English: Lesser Town of Prague) is a district of the city of Prague, Czech Republic, and one of its most historic neighbourhoods.

In the Middle Ages, it was a dominant center of the ethnic German (and since 16th century also Italian) citizens of Prague. It also housed many noble palaces while the right-bank towns were comparatively more bourgeois and more Bohemian Czech.

== Name ==
The name Malá Strana literally means "Little Side", though it is frequently referred to as "Lesser Town", "Lesser Quarter", or "Lesser Side". It is on the left (west) bank of the river Vltava, on the slopes just below Prague Castle. The name distinguishes it from the larger districts of Prague on the right bank, with which it is linked by the Charles Bridge.

Originally, when it was founded in 1257, the district was called the New Town beneath Prague Castle (Czech: Nové Město pod Pražským hradem). When Charles IV founded the New Town of Prague in 1348, Malá Strana was renamed the Lesser Town of Prague (Czech: Menší Město pražské). In the 17th century, the unofficial name Little Quarter (Czech: Malá Strana) was used.

== History ==
Malá Strana and Hradčany from the roof of the National Theatre, before 1905

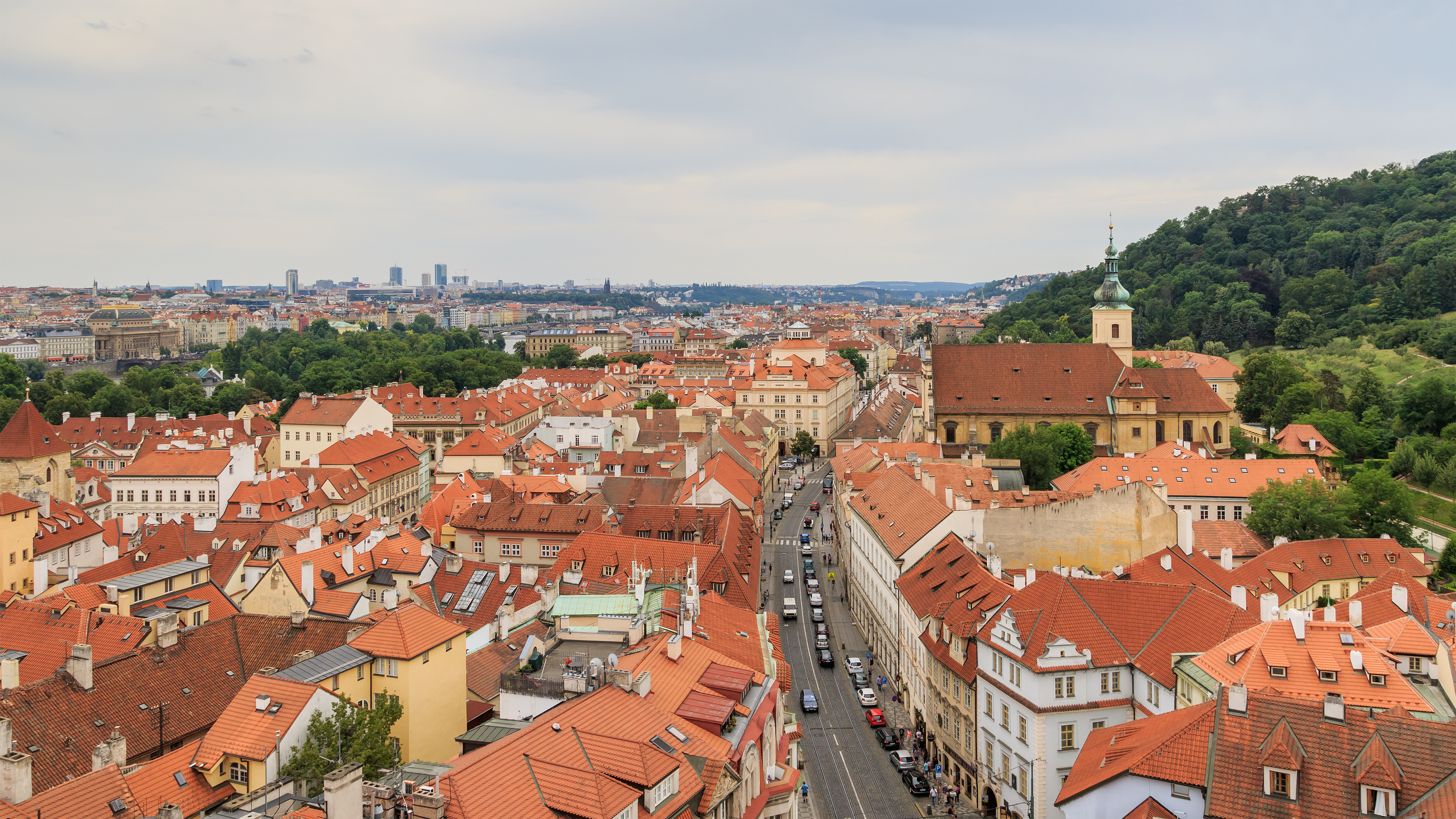
View of Malá Strana from St. Nicholas Church

Malá Strana was founded by the King Ottokar II of Bohemia in 1257. As a royal town (a town founded by the king) it got many privileges. It was created by amalgamating a number of settlements beneath the Prague Castle into a single administrative unit. The original residents were expelled and mostly German craftsmen and merchants were invited by the king. Even though the city was royal, the king did not master the city as a whole.

In the second half of the 14th century the Lesser Town of Prague was extended by the King and Holy Roman Emperor Charles IV who built a new defensive wall called Hunger Wall.

In 1419–1420 the Lesser Town was burnt down by Hussites. In 1541 the town was strongly damaged again by a fire which killed fifty people. After this fire the town was rebuilt in the Renaissance style and many palaces of nobility were built there.

The market place, now known as Malostranské náměstí (Lesser Town Square), was the center of the town. This square is divided into the upper and lower parts with the St. Nicholas Church in the middle.

== Demographics ==
Historical population

Year	Pop.	±%
1869	22,140	—
1880	20,963	−5.3%
1890	20,447	−2.5%
1900	21,161	+3.5%
1910	20,374	−3.7%

Year	Pop.	±%
1921	22,780	+11.8%
1930	21,218	−6.9%
1950	16,818	−20.7%
1961	15,184	−9.7%
1970	13,150	−13.4%

Year	Pop.	±%
1980	10,704	−18.6%
1991	8,411	−21.4%
2001	6,809	−19.0%
2011	5,687	−16.5%
2021	4,584	−19.4%

Source: Censuses

== Architecture ==
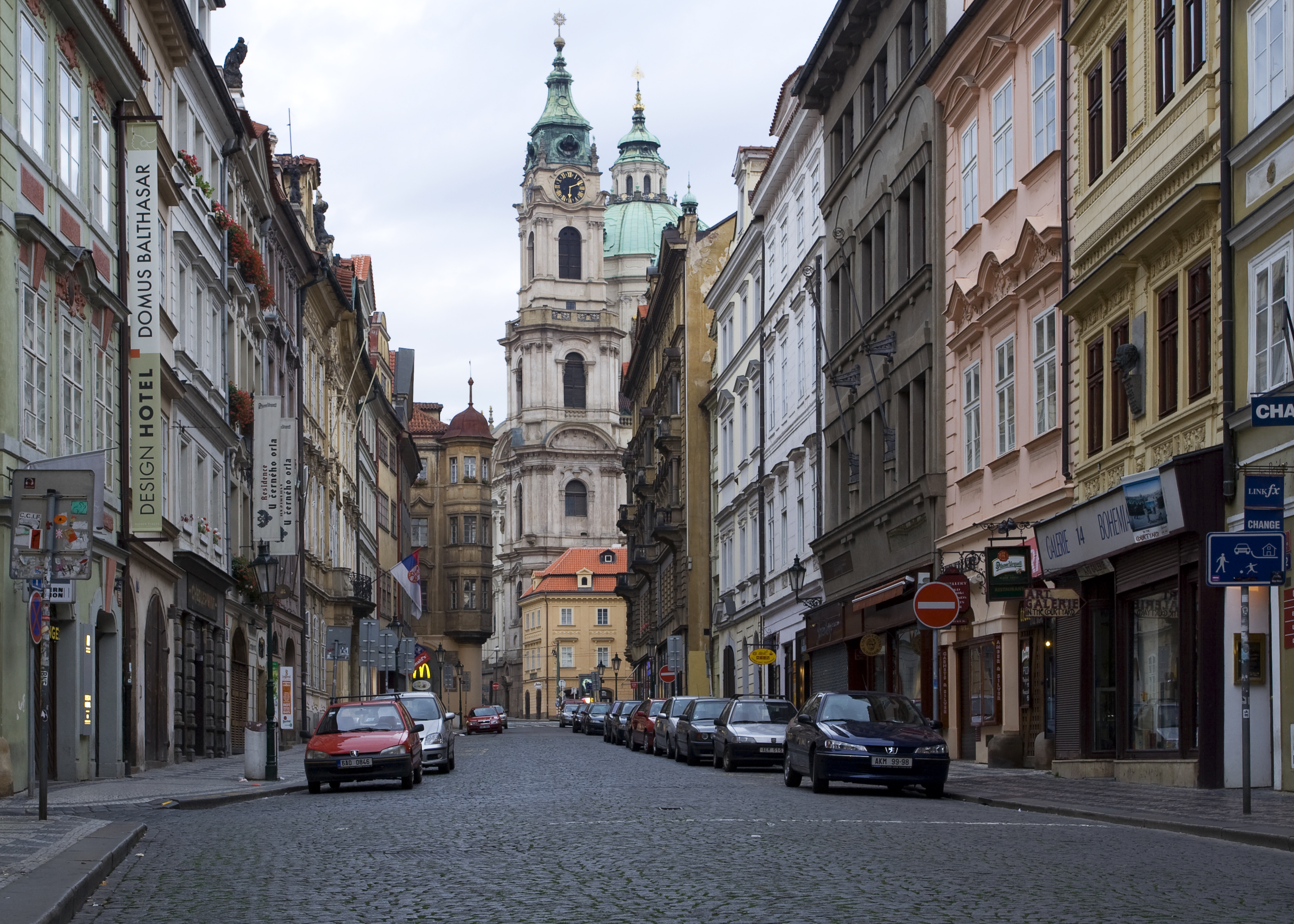
A view of the Mostecká viewed towards Malostranské Náměstí with the Church of Saint Nicolas in the background just after sunrise

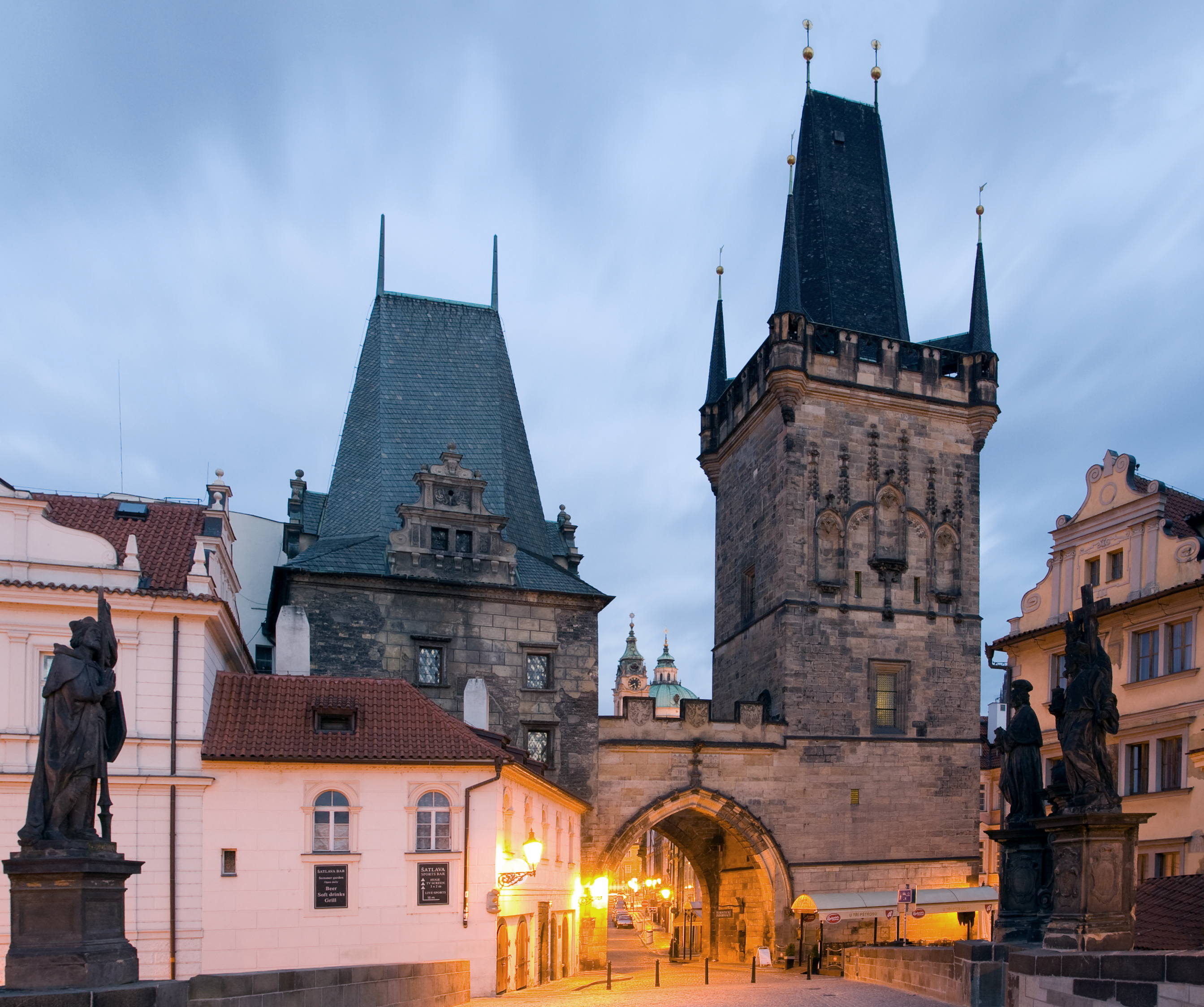
A view of the bridge tower at the end of the Charles Bridge on the side of Malá Strana

Baroque architecture predominates in Malá Strana, but the history of the district dates back to far before the Baroque era. Baroque architecture eventually dominated when the style was implanted on Malá Strana after the destructive fires in 1541.

== Points of interest ==
- The most extensive building of the Baroque Era on Malá Strana is the Wallenstein Palace. Albrecht von Wallenstein was a military general-in-chief of Emperor Ferdinand II. Under his order 26 new houses and old gates were built on the freed place. The extensive palace complex with five courtyards and the garden, which is set as a French Park.
- The churches are the most frequent and interesting developments on Malá Strana. The finest one and the most prominent is the St. Nicholas Church. This is a masterpiece of Christoph and Kilian Ignaz Dientzenhofer, father and son. The finest painting in the church is an apotheosis of Saint Nicholas, the defender of children, seamen, and wayfollowers. This painting is set in the dome. It depicts an apotheosis of Saint Trinity.
- The famous statue of the Holy Infant Jesus of Prague is in the Church of Our Lady Victorious in Malá Strana. The devotion and the church drew millions of Roman Catholic faithful to Malá Strana throughout the years.
- In 1989, the Prague Embassy of West Germany, in the Palais Lobkowicz, was the site of a drama involving thousands of East German refugees. Their cars were left behind in the quarter.
- The famous Czech novelist Jan Neruda was born, lived in and wrote about Malá Strana; Nerudova Street is named after him.
- The Petřín lookout tower is located in Malá Strana.
- The Czech composer Bohuslav Martinu lived in an apartment near Kampa Island in the Malá Strana while a conservatory student, and a plaque now commemorates his stay.

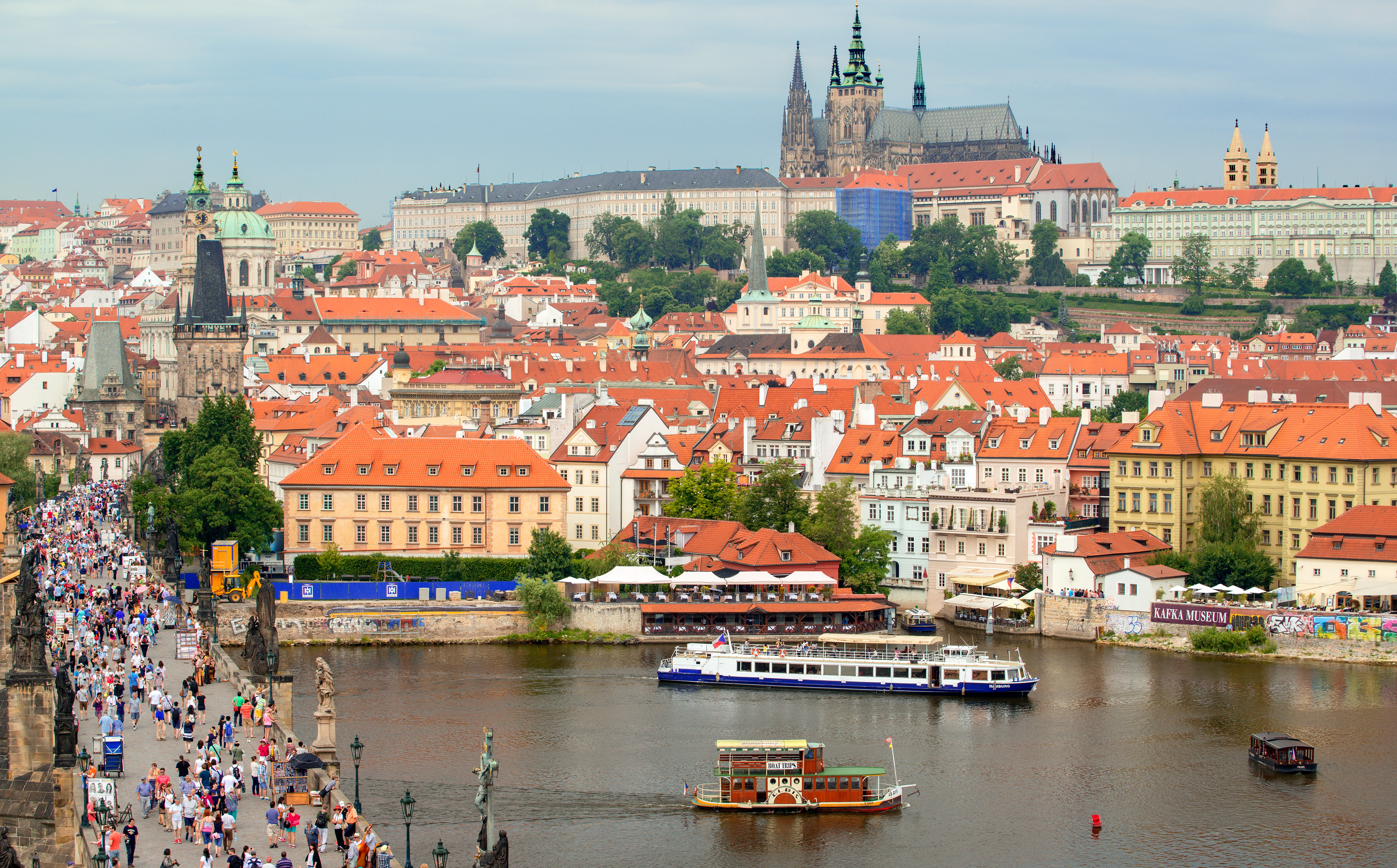
Charles Bridge (Karlův most), Vltava River, Prague, 2015

== Bibliography ==
- Prague, the wayguide. By ARTFOTO printing house, Russian Language Edition.
