= Augustin Němejc =

Czech painter (1861–1938)

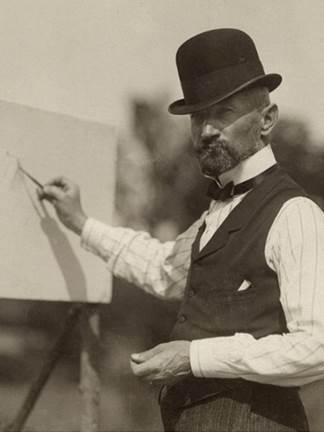
Augustin Němejc painting en plein aire (1907)

Augustin Němejc (15 March 1861, Nepomuk – 16 August 1938, Plzeň) was a Czech painter, known for his portrayals of village life and costumes from the Plzeň Region.

== Biography ==
Němejc was born in Nepomuk in 1861, son of a butcher and brewer. In 1875, he was apprenticed to a watchmaker. After becoming a journeyman, he travelled extensively to improve his skills. This included a stay in Italy, where visits to art galleries inspired him to become a painter instead.

With the patronage of a noblewoman, Vilemína Josefina z Auerspergu, he began taking lessons from František Sequens and Maximilian Pirner at the Academy of Fine Arts, Prague, He continued his studies at the Academy of Fine Arts, Munich with Alexander von Wagner, and then worked as a painter and art teacher in Plzeň.

His painting "Hopeless Love" won a major award at the General Land Centennial Exhibition in 1891. It also earned him a one-year scholarship to study in Paris where he worked with Vojtěch Hynais, who had created the curtain for the Prague National Theater.

In 1900, as a result of this experience, he was commissioned to create a curtain for the new Josef Kajetán Tyl Theatre. At about the same time, he painted lunettes at the recently completed West Bohemian Museum. He also created monumental paintings for the Higher Economic School, now a satellite institute of Charles University. From 1907 to 1925, he was a teacher at the girls' lyceum.

He is best known as a regionalist, focusing on costumes and village life from the surrounding areas. A museum has been opened at his family home in Nepomuk and, on the 150th anniversary of his birth in 2011, a memorial plaque was placed at his home in Plzeň.

== Selected paintings ==
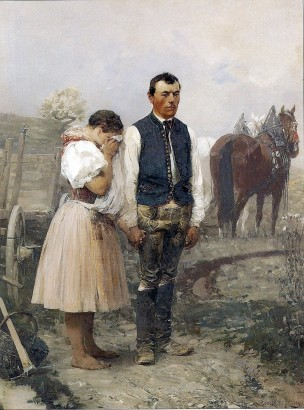
Hopeless Love

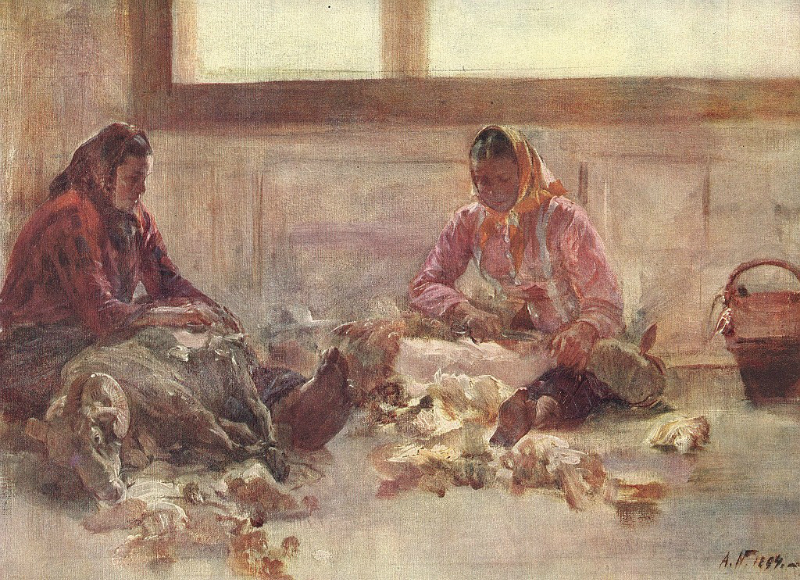
Sheep Shearing

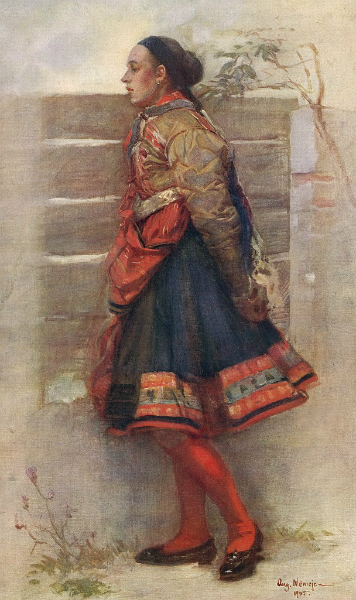
At the Fence

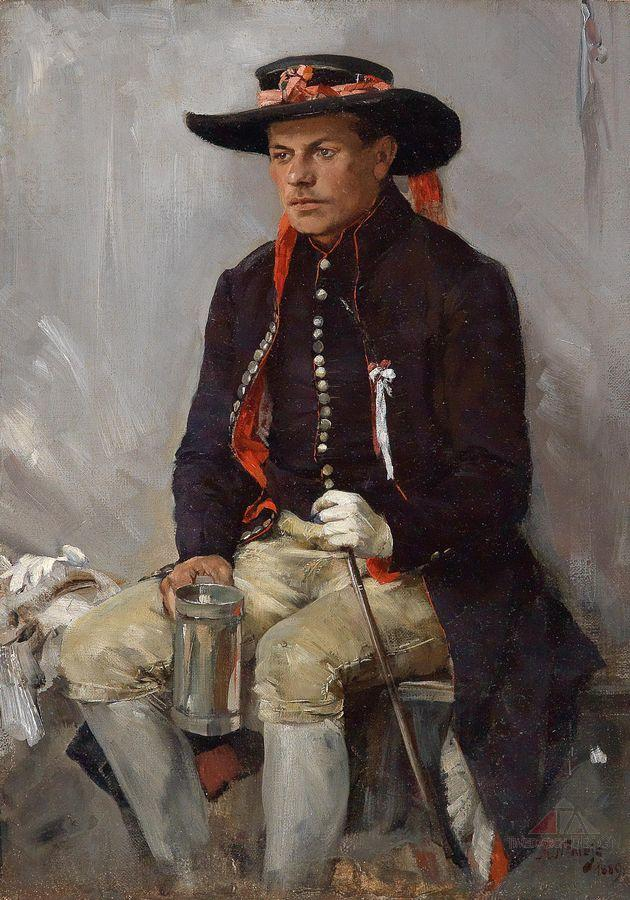
Thirsty Visitor
