= Petřín Lookout Tower =

Tower in Prague, Czech Republic

- Petřínská rozhledna
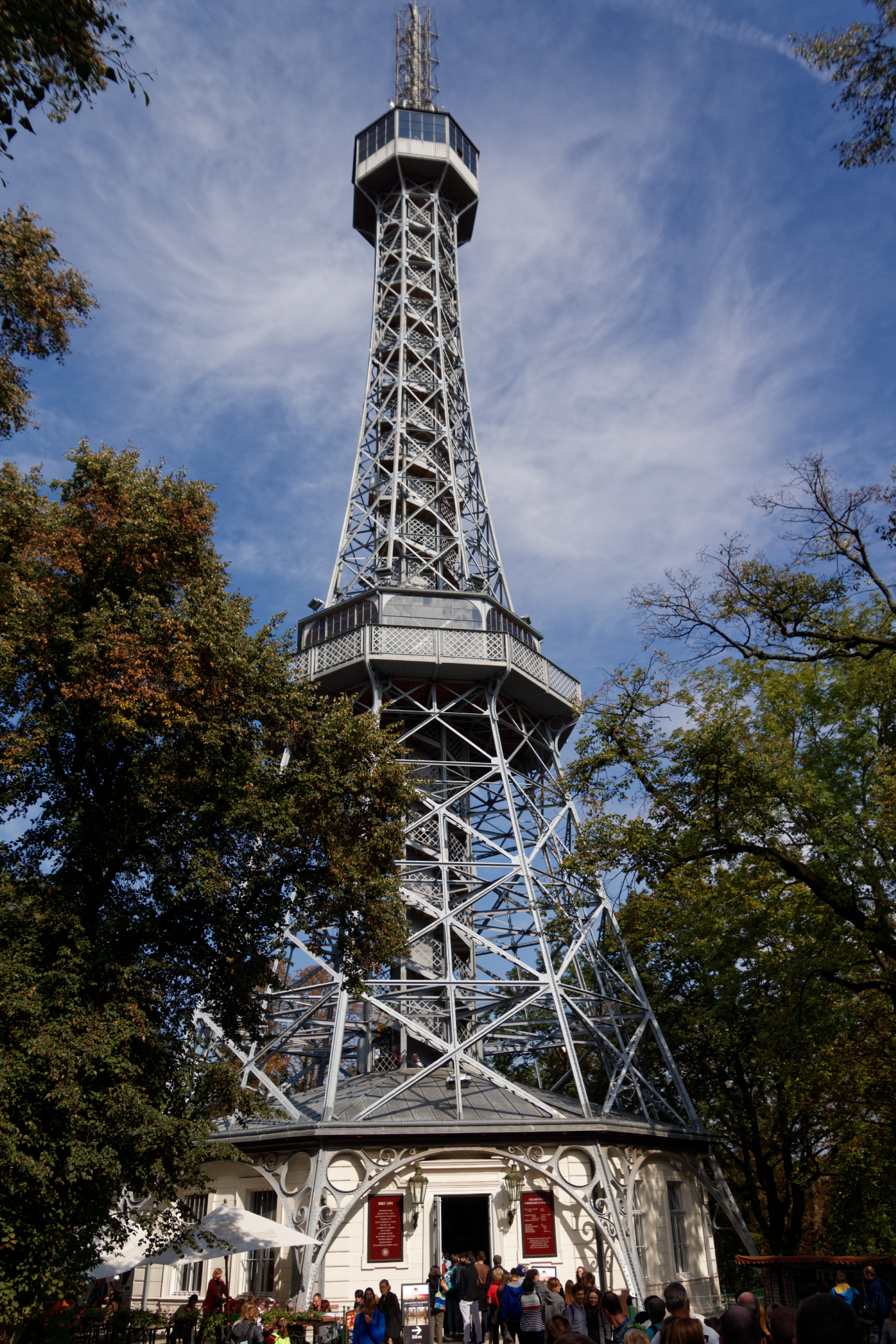
- Interactive map of the Petřín Lookout Tower area

General information
- Location: Petřín, Prague 1, Petřínské sady 633, Czech Republic
- Coordinates: 50°05′0.76″N 14°23′42.18″E
- Completed: 1891

Website
- Official website

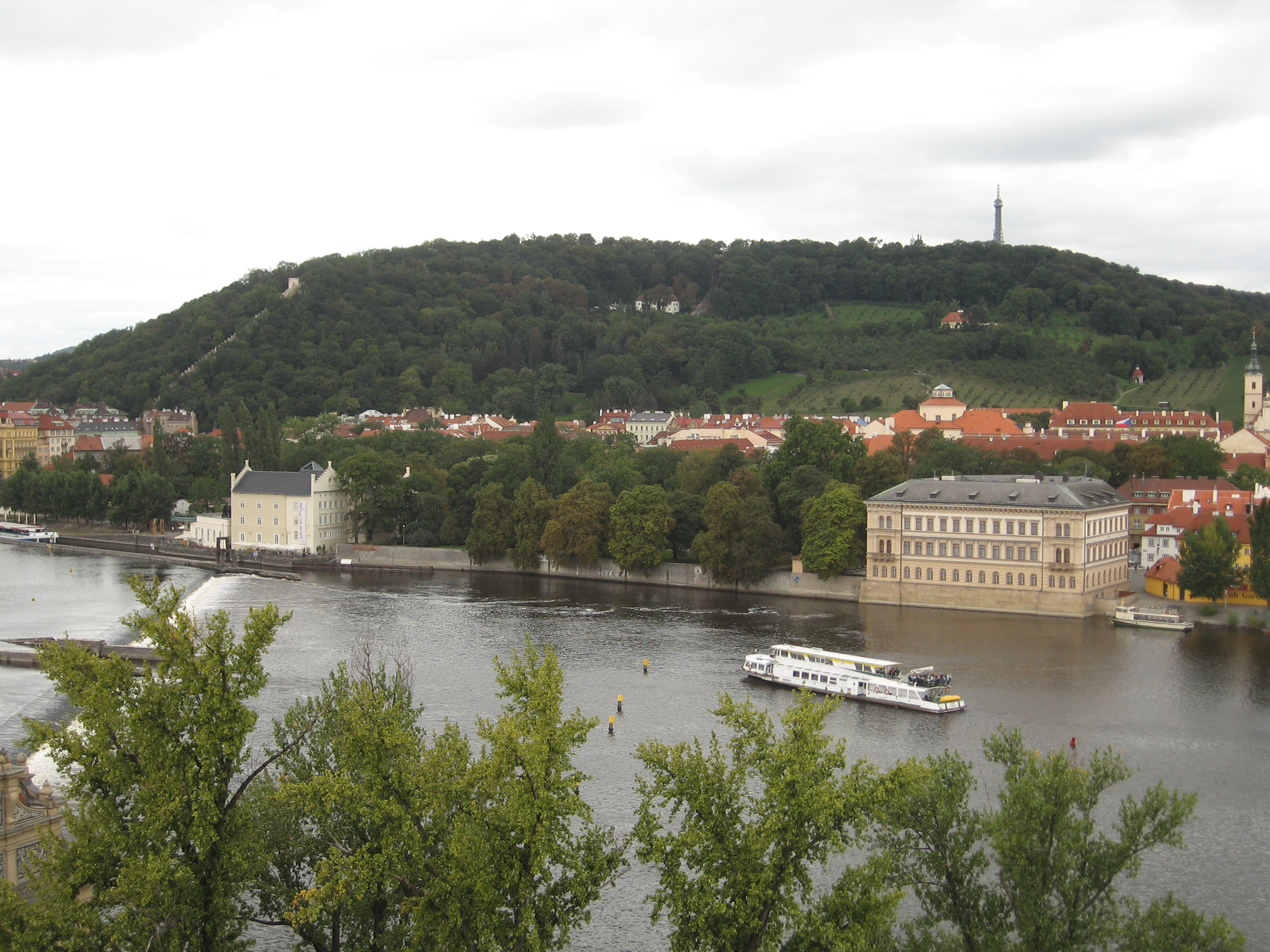
Petřín Hill with the lookout tower

The Petřín Lookout Tower (Czech: Petřínská rozhledna) is a steel-framework tower 63.5 metres (208 ft) tall on Petřín Hill in Prague, built in 1891. It resembles the Eiffel Tower and was used as an observation tower as well as a transmission tower. Today, the tower is a major tourist attraction.

== Description ==
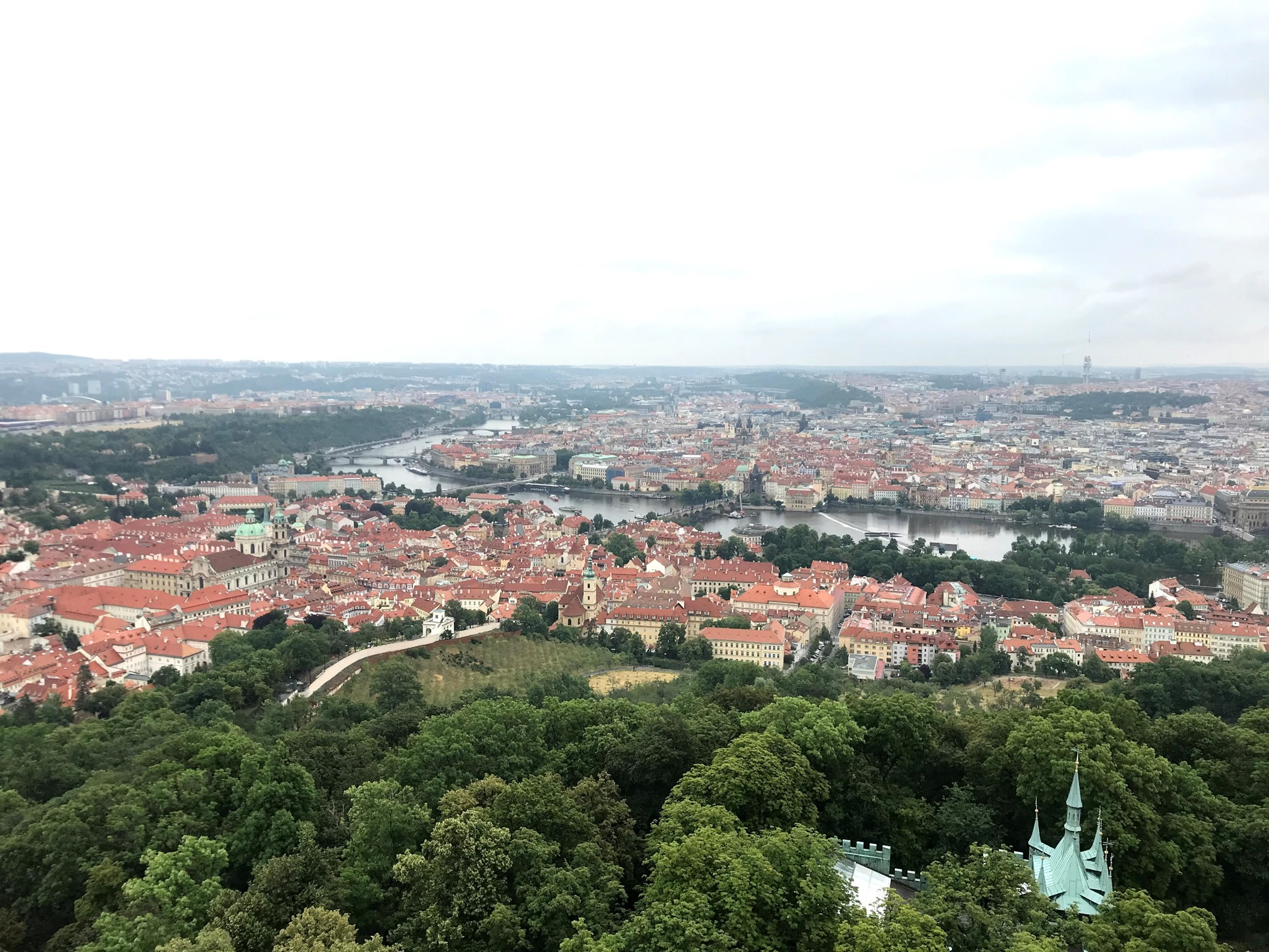
View out towards Prague from Petřín Tower

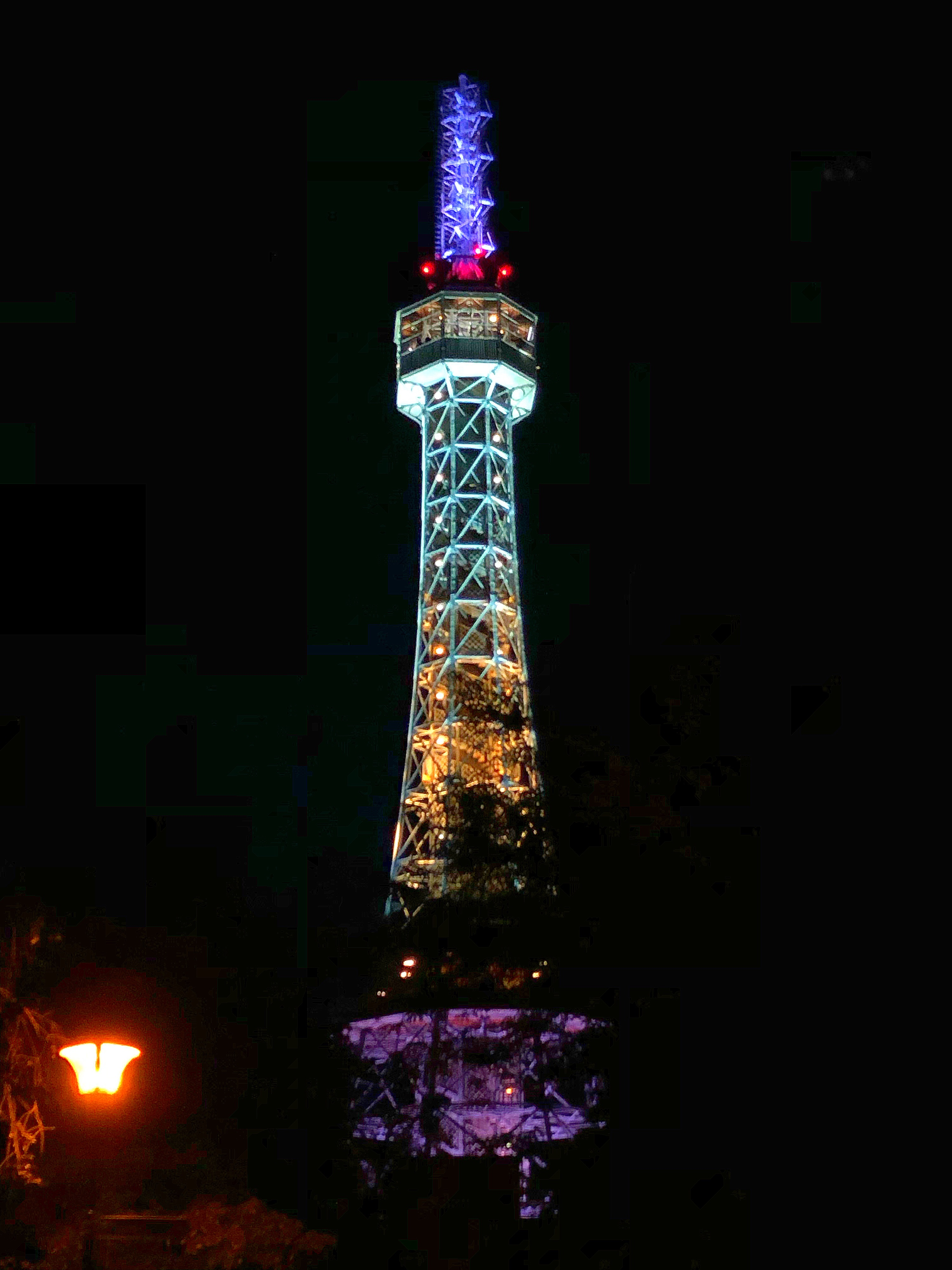
Petřín Lookout Tower at night

The Petřín Hill is roughly a half-hour walk up paths and the tower is also quite an arduous climb; however, the hill is served by a frequent Petřín funicular and the tower has an elevator for elderly and disabled people. In 2014 the tower was visited by more than 557,000 visitors, with foreigners accounting for over 70% of said visitors.

The two observation platforms are accessible via 299 stairs in sections of 13 per flight running around the inside of the structure. A pair of staircases form a double-helix structure allowing visitors travelling up and down concurrently.

There is a gift shop and a small cafeteria on the main level. On the lowest level is a small exhibition area. One exhibition displayed Merkur Observation Towers and was held from 6 March 2013 to 30 March 2014.

== Comparisons to the Eiffel Tower ==
Petřín Lookout Tower is often described a smaller version of the Eiffel Tower, which is 328m tall. In contrast to the Eiffel Tower, Petřín Lookout Tower has an octagonal, not square, cross-section. Further, it does not stand, as does the Eiffel Tower, on four columns of lattice steel. The whole area under its legs is covered with the entrance hall.

A similarity between the Eiffel Tower and Petřín Lookout Tower is the design of the lowest cross beams in the form of round bones.

== History ==
In 1889, members of the Club of Czech Tourists visited the world exposition in Paris and were inspired by the Eiffel Tower. They collected a sufficient amount of money and in March 1891 the building of the tower started for the World's Jubilee Exhibition. It was finished in only four months.

The tower had a lift for six people, first on a gas train, later on an electric drive. In 1953, a television transmitter was set up in the tower and the lift was removed, the tube was filled with cables and power supply.

In 1953, a television broadcasting antenna was installed on Petřín Lookout Tower, the program feed performed by a directional radio antenna. This served as Prague's television signal provider until the opening of the Žižkov Television Tower in late 1992.

The tower was closed for public during reconstruction in 1979–1992. In 1999–2002, the tower was again completely reconstructed and a new lift for disabled and elderly people was installed.

From 21 January 2013 the tower has been operated by City of Prague Museum.

== See also ==
3d model of the tower

- List of Eiffel Tower replicas
- List of towers
