= Czech Space Team =

Organization managing spaceflight activities

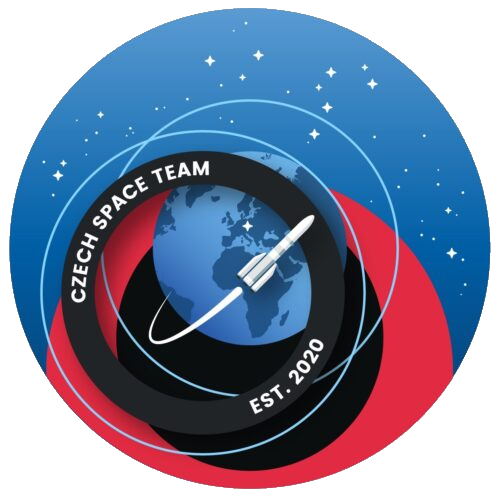
- Czech Space Team badge by Jakub Bobuski

Agency overview
- Formed: 2020; 6 years ago
- Preceding agency: Czech Space Office
- Type: Consortium of public institutions
- Jurisdiction: (Czech Republic) Czech republic
- Status: Active
- Website: www.czechspaceportal.cz

Czech Space Team is a consortium of public institutions managing spaceflight activities in the Czech Republic. It includes the Ministry of Transport, Czechinvest, Planetum (Štefánik's Observatory, Ďáblice Observatory, and Prague Planetarium), and the Czech Academy of Sciences. It organizes the annual Czech Space Week and participates in the Czech Journey to Space project which is expected to culminate in the Vast-PAM-1 mission of the Czech ESA astronaut Aleš Svoboda to the ISS in 2027.

== See also ==
- List of Czech satellites
