= Planetum-1 =

Czech educational satellite

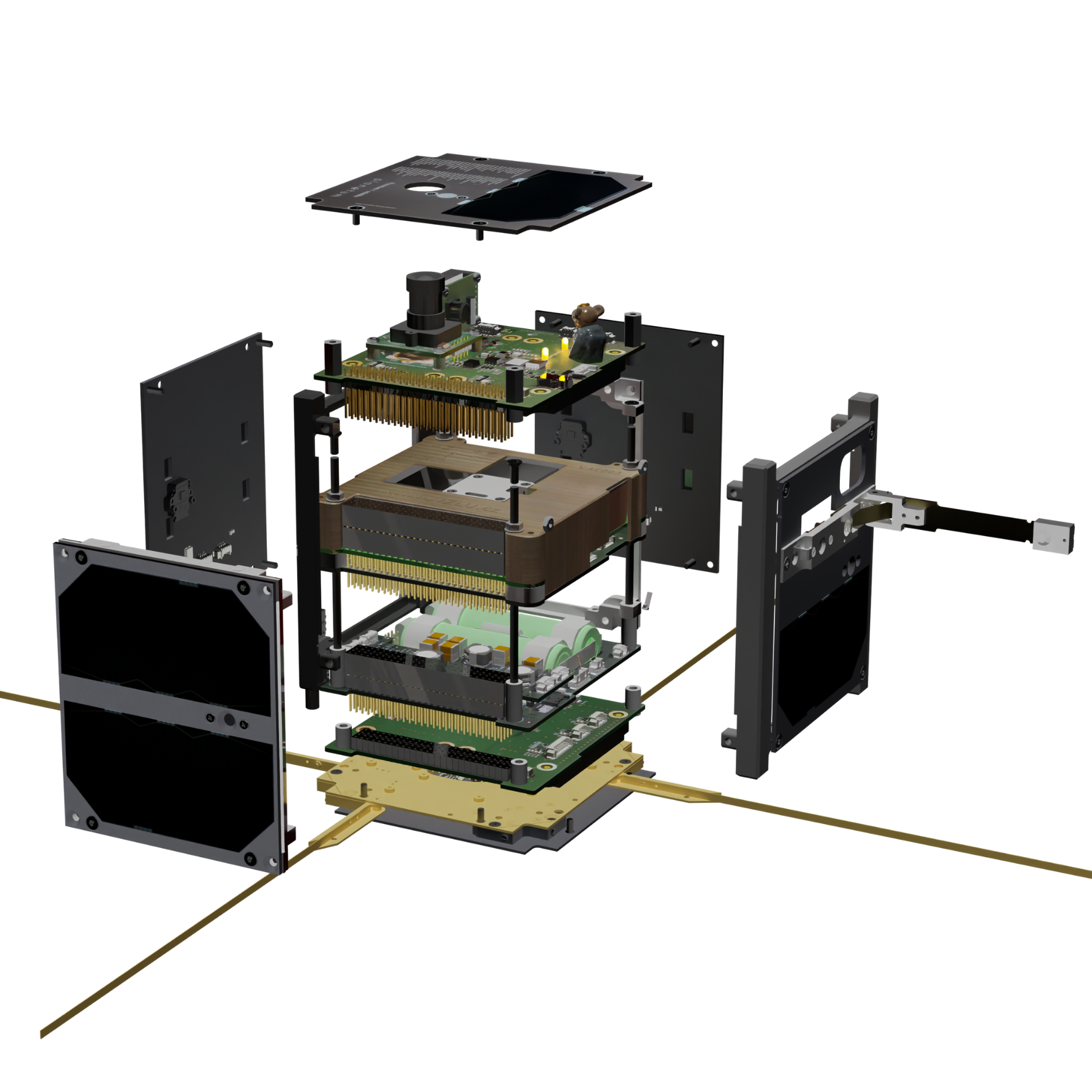
- Operator: Planetum
- COSPAR ID: 2022-057G
- SATCAT no.: 52738
- Website: www.planetum.cz/co-nabizime/druzice-planetum-1

Spacecraft properties
- Spacecraft type: 1U CubeSat
- Manufacturer: Spacemanic

Start of mission
- Launch date: 25 May 2022
- Rocket: Falcon 9 Transporter-5

End of mission
- Decay date: 2024

Planetum-1 was a Czech educational satellite developed by Planetum, a Prague-based organization uniting Prague Planetarium, Štefánik's Observatory, and Ďáblice Observatory, in cooperation with VZLU Aerospace and the Brno-based company Spacemanic. The 1U CubeSat included a precise orientation system, six Sun sensors, two cameras, and a magnetometer. The satellite was launched in May 2022 on Falcon 9's Transporter-5 mission and ended its mission in destructive re-entry in November 2024.
