= Cyclone roller coaster (Prague) =

Amusement ride in Czech Republic

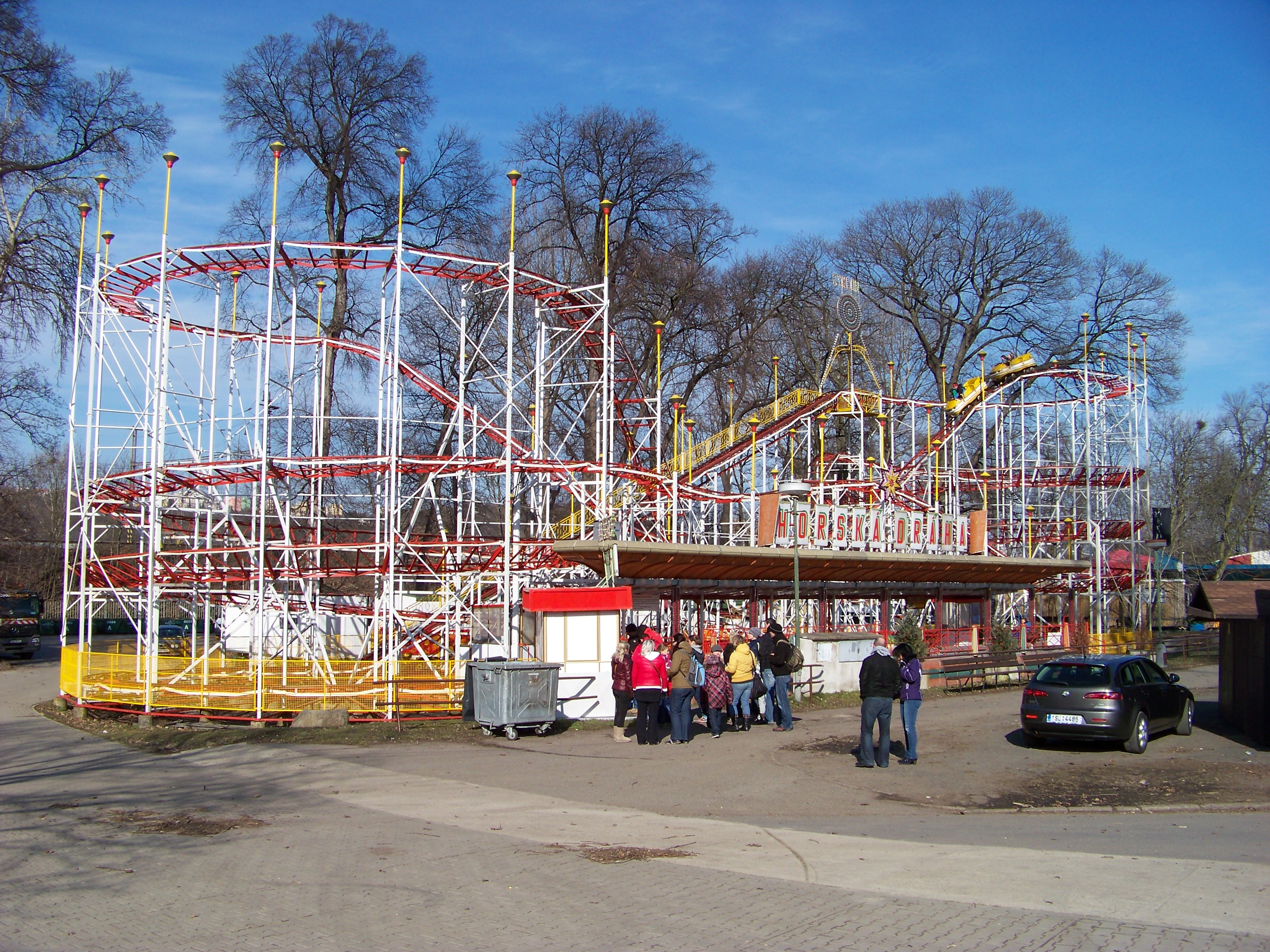
- The roller coaster in 2013

Výstaviště Praha
- Location: Výstaviště Praha
- Status: Operating
- Opening date: 1975, 2025
- Closing date: 2018

General statistics
- Type: Steel
- Manufacturer: S.D.C.
- Model: Galaxi
- Height: 42.7 ft (13.0 m)
- Length: 1,443.6 ft (440.0 m)
- Speed: 28.6 mph (46.0 km/h)
- G-force: 2.5
- Cyclone roller coaster at RCDB

Cyclone roller coaster is a roller coaster in Prague, Czech Republic. It was part of the Matějská pouť (St. Matthew's fun fair) from 1975 to 2018. The Cyclone, originally built in 1963 and a staple at the Výstaviště Praha fairgrounds since 1975, was removed in 2018 as part of urban revitalization plans. After seven years' absence it is set to reopen from 22 February to 15 April 2025.

== History and renovation ==
The Cyclone, manufactured by the Italian company S.D.C. as one of their Galaxy models, has been a main attraction in Prague for over four decades. After its removal in 2018, the Štaubert family, who have maintained the coaster since its arrival in Prague, undertook an extensive restoration project. The entire structure was dismantled, cleaned, and rebuilt piece by piece, reinforcing key parts and upgrading certain sections to ensure safety.

The Cyclone roller coaster is a 13-metre (43 ft)-high steel structure, known for its speed and twists. It was successfully tested and opened for limited public use in 2024.
