= Antonín Rükl =

Czech cartographer

Antonín Rükl (22 September 1932 – 12 July 2016) was a Czech astronomer, cartographer, and author.

== Early life and education ==
He was born in Čáslav, Czechoslovakia. As a student, he developed what was to be a lifelong interest in astronomy. He graduated from the Czech Technical University in 1956, then joined the staff of the astronomical department of the Institute of Geodesy in Prague.

== Career ==
In 1960, he joined the Prague Planetarium, eventually becoming deputy director and then head. He also became chairman of the Planetary Section of the Czechoslovak Astronomical Society and served as vice president of the International Planetarium Directors Conference from 1996 until 1999. He retired at the end of 1999.

During his career, he was a popularizer of astronomy and authored many books on the subject. He was skilled in cartography and selenography, the skill of mapping the Moon. He illustrated many of his own books, including the highly regarded Atlas of the Moon.

== Personal life ==
He was married to Sonja. They had a daughter Jane and son Mike.

== Bibliography ==
Incomplete list:

- Atlas of the Moon, 2004, Sky Publishing Corp, ISBN 1-931559-07-4.
- The Constellation Guide Book, 2000, ISBN 0-8069-3979-6.
- Moon, Mars and Venus, Reed Dump, 1976, ISBN 0-600-36219-1.
- The Amateur Astronomer, Gallery Books, 1985, ISBN 0-8317-0295-8.
- Hamlyn Atlas of the Moon, Hamlyn, 1991, ISBN 0-600-57190-4.
- A Guide to the Stars, Constellations and Planets, Caxton Editions, 2000, ISBN 1-84067-050-9.
- Maps of Lunar Hemispheres, 1:10000000, D. Reidel, Dordrecht, 1972.
- Skeleton Map of the Moon, 1:6000000, Central Institute of Geodesy and Cartography, Prague, 1965.
- The Constellations.
- The Hamlyn Encyclopedia of Stars and Planets, The Hamlyn Publishing Group Limited, Prague, 1988. ISBN 0-600-55151-2.
- Maps of Lunar Hemispheres
