= HD 185269 =

Triple star system in the constellation Cygnus

Observation data Epoch J2000.0 Equinox ICRS
- Constellation: Cygnus
- Right ascension: 19^{h} 37^{m} 11.74116^{s}
- Declination: +28° 29′ 59.5070″
- Apparent magnitude (V): 6.67

Characteristics
- Evolutionary stage: subgiant
- Spectral type: G0IV
- B−V color index: 0.58

Astrometry
| Proper motion (μ) | RA: −31.563 mas/yr Dec.: −81.082 mas/yr |
| Parallax (π) | 19.2423±0.0182 mas |
| Distance | 169.5 ± 0.2 ly (51.97 ± 0.05 pc) |
| Absolute magnitude (M_{V}) | 3.29 |
| Absolute bolometric magnitude (M_{bol}) | 3.228 |

Details
| Mass | 1.33 M_{☉} |
| Radius | 2.1 R_{☉} |
| Luminosity | 4.8 L_{☉} |
| Surface gravity (log g) | 4.05 cgs |
| Temperature | 5,983 K |
| Metallicity [Fe/H] | 0.10 dex |
| Rotation | 29.5 days |
| Rotational velocity (v sin i) | 5.5 km/s |
| Age | 4.0 Gyr |

Other designations
- BD+28°3412, HIP 96507, SAO 87464

Database references
| SIMBAD | data |
| Exoplanet Archive | data |

HD 185269 is a stellar triple system approximately 170 light-years away in the constellation Cygnus. It is easily visible to binoculars, but not the naked eye.

The primary star is a third more massive and nearly five times as luminous than the Sun. The spectrum of the star is G0IV. About 4.5 arcseconds away are the two other stars, which are much less massive than the Sun. The primary has a mass of 0.165 M_{☉}, while the secondary has a mass of 0.154 M_{☉}.

== Planetary system ==
The Jupiter-mass hot Jupiter was independently discovered orbiting the primary star by two different teams using doppler spectroscopy. One group led by Claire Moutou used the ELODIE spectrograph at the Haute-Provence Observatory in France while John Asher Johnson and collaborators used the Coudé Auxiliary and C. Donald Shane telescopes at Lick Observatory in California. The planet takes 6.8 days to orbit at 0.077 AU from the primary star in an eccentric orbit.

The HD 185269 planetary system
| Companion (in order from star) | Mass | Semimajor axis (AU) | Orbital period (days) | Eccentricity | Inclination (°) | Radius |
|---|---|---|---|---|---|---|
| b | ≥1.010±0.014 M_{J} | 0.0770±0.0034 | 6.83776±0.00027 | 0.229±0.014 | — | — |

== See also ==
- List of extrasolar planets
