= Ďáblice Observatory =

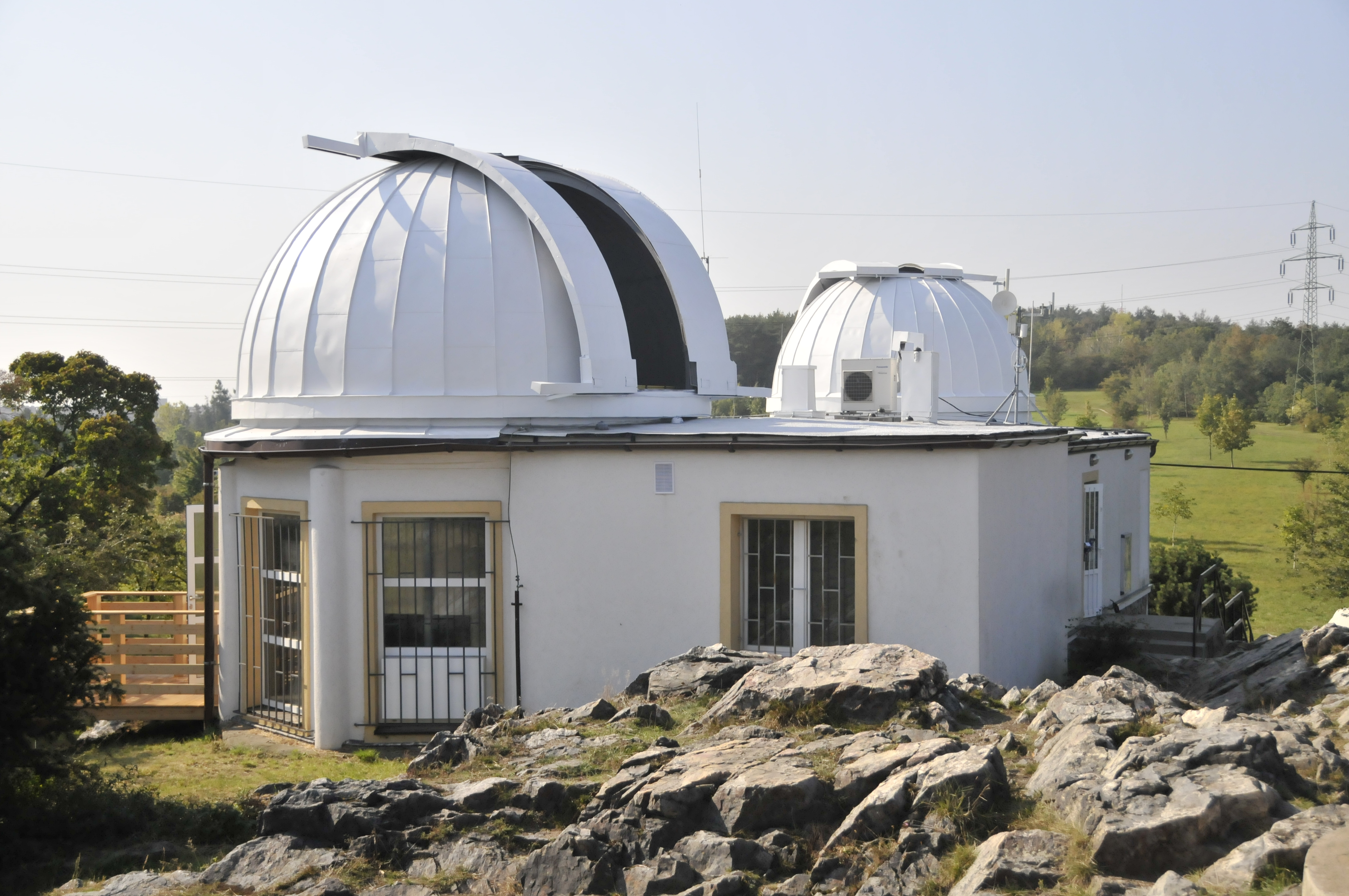
- Northeast facade
- Organization: Planetum
- Location: Prague, Czech Republic
- Coordinates: 50.140869°N 14.476768°E
- Altitude: 325 metres (1,066 ft)
- Established: 1956
- Related media on Commons

Ďáblice Observatory (Czech: hvězdárna Ďáblice) is an astronomical observatory on Ládví Hill in the Ďáblice district of Prague, Czech Republic. It is one of two observatories in the city, along with Štefánik's Observatory in central Prague. The observatory has two domes and was constructed in 1956. In modern times, the observatory hosts both professional astronomers and public events.

== History ==
The observatory was built between 1954 and 1956 by members of the Czechoslovak Astronomy Society as part of Action Z. It was built using 25 leftover panels from the construction of the first prefabricated house in Prague for a symbolic price of CZK 1 per panel. Two domes with a diameter of 5 m were fabricated in the village below and installed onto the observatory. These efforts were supported by Miloslav Wimmer (1922–2010), the architect of the prefabricated panel system, and Hubert Slouka, an astronomer and expert advisor. Slouka also contributed to the installation of the telescope for the National Technical Museum.

The Ďáblice Observatory began operating on November 3, 1956. The west dome, basement, new office, and a glass connecting corridor were added by 1965. A 30 cm diameter telescope on a classic German equatorial mount and a 19 cm diameter telescope were installed in the new dome from the estate of Mgr. Fischer in Podolí (Prague). In 1968, the village of Ďáblice was incorporated into the city of Prague, and the Ďáblice Observatory became part of Štefánik's Observatory on Petřín hill. In 1979, both observatories merged with the Prague Planetarium in Stromovka park.

In 1970, a third metallic dome with a diameter of 3.5 m was built east of the main building. The founder of the society, Zdeněk Corn (1921–2003), directed operations at the observatory until his retirement. In the decades to follow, the observatory began a program of monitoring the occultation of stars by the Moon and, later, by asteroids. Visual observations eventually gave way to precise camera-based recording whose data was shared with scientific institutions abroad. Refurbishment of the observatory was completed in the 1990s. With the inclusion of a Coudé-style telescope, which does not require a ladder to access the eyepieces, Ďáblice Observatory became one of the only Czech observatories to offer accessibility for wheelchair users.

== Technology ==
The western dome has a 19 cm diameter refracting telescope and 3 m focal length, originally in the František Fischer Observatory, a now-defunct private observatory in Podolí. This telescope is considered the oldest public telescope in the Czech Republic, dating to 1903.

Two other telescopes are installed on a German equatorial mount, including an instrument for observing the solar chromosphere with a hydrogen-alpha filter, and a 30 cm diameter mirror photographic telescope connected to a computer.

The eastern, barrier-free dome houses another two telescopes, including a refractor with an objective diameter of 15 cm and a mirror telescope with a 40 cm diameter.

== Gallery ==
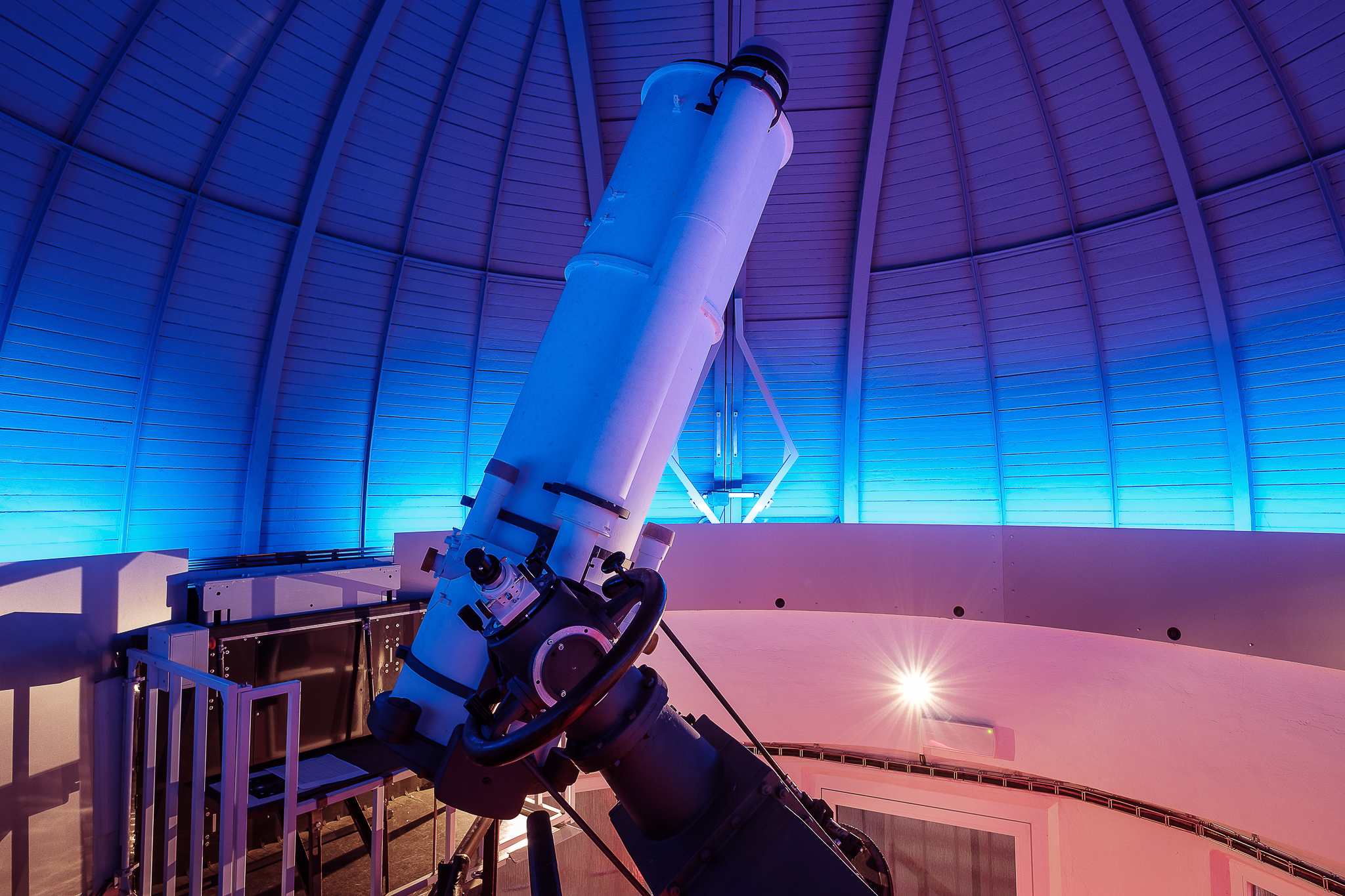
Mirror telescope within cupola

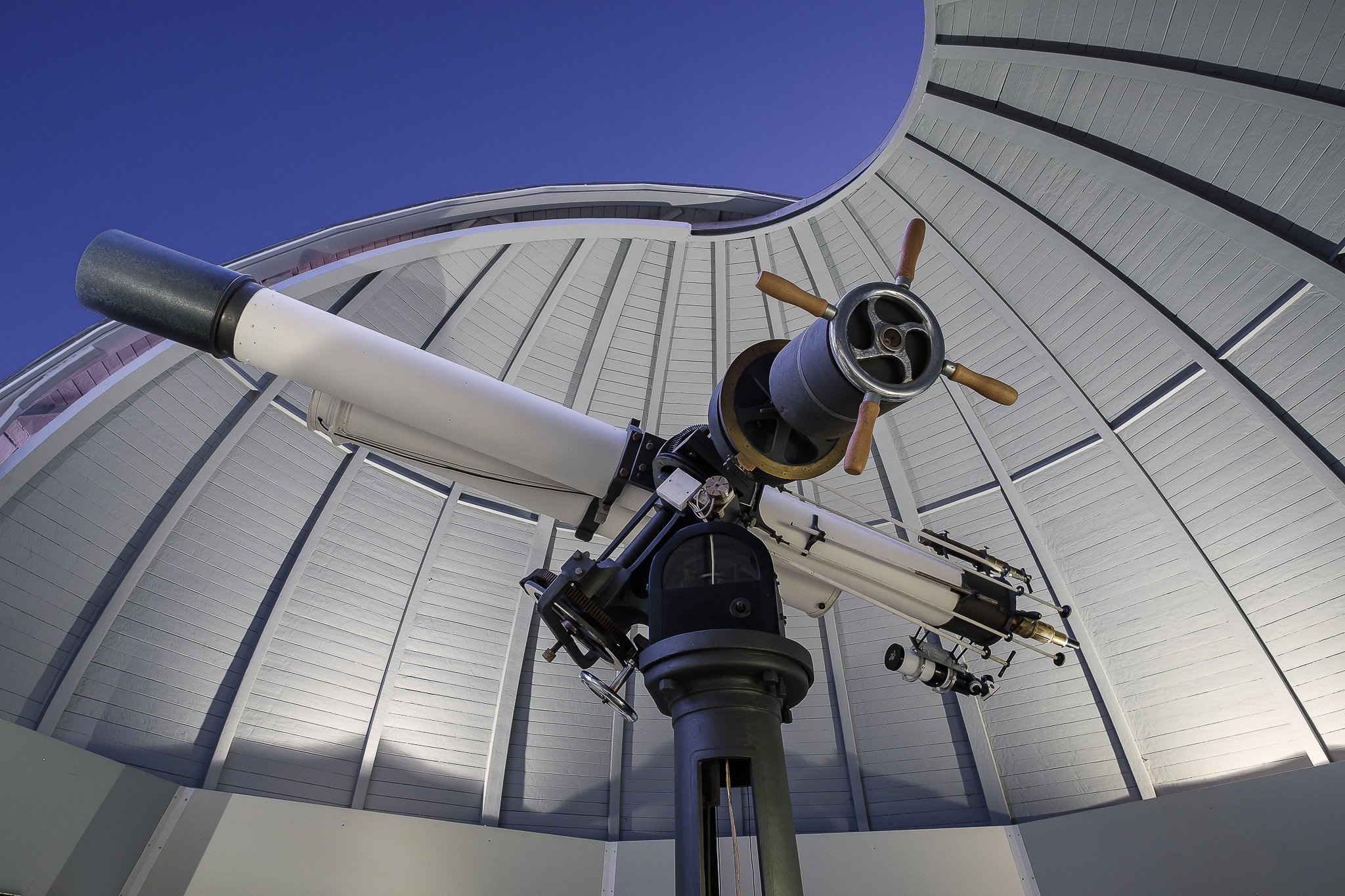
Lens telescope with open dome

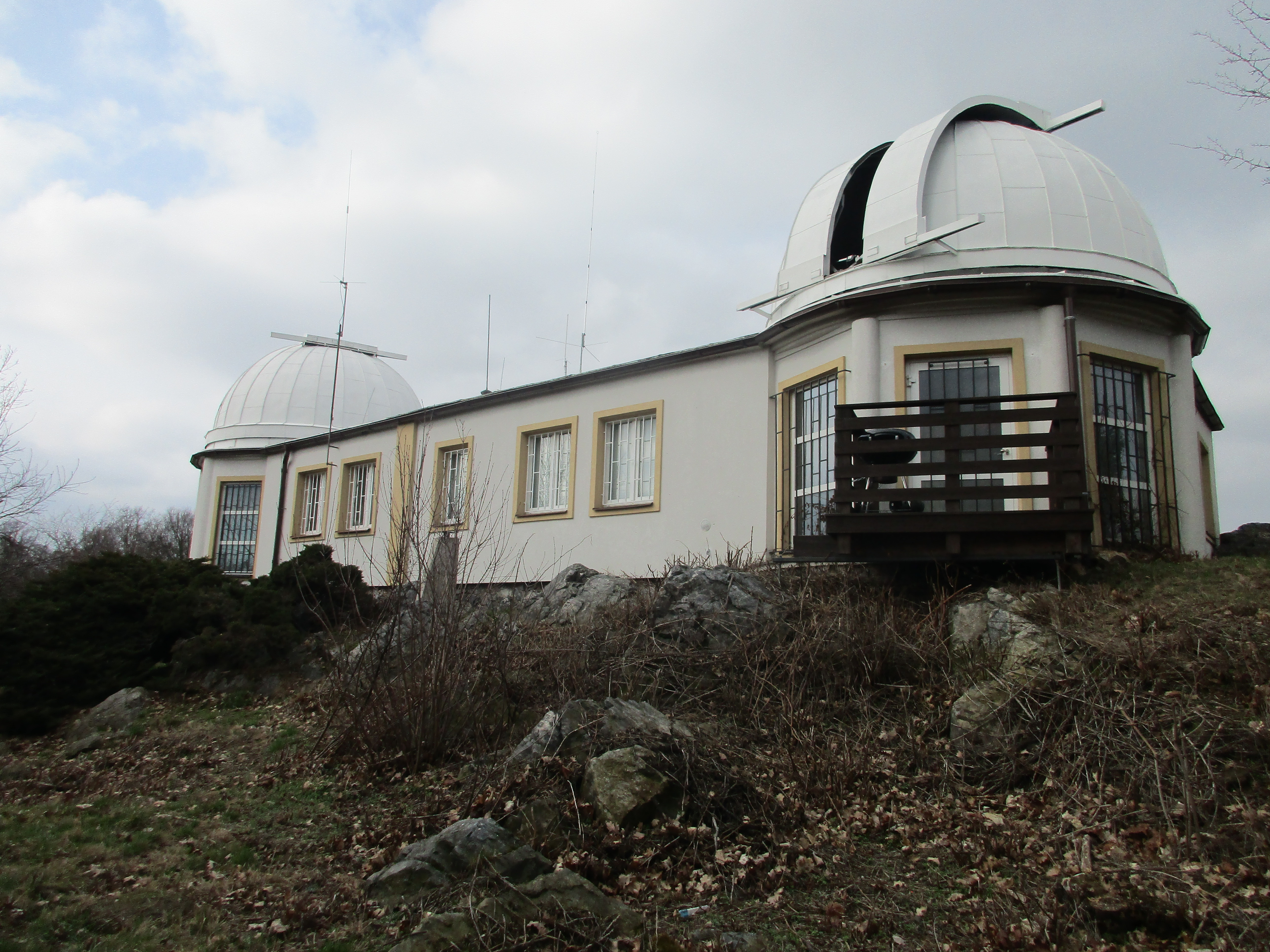
Observatory southeast facade

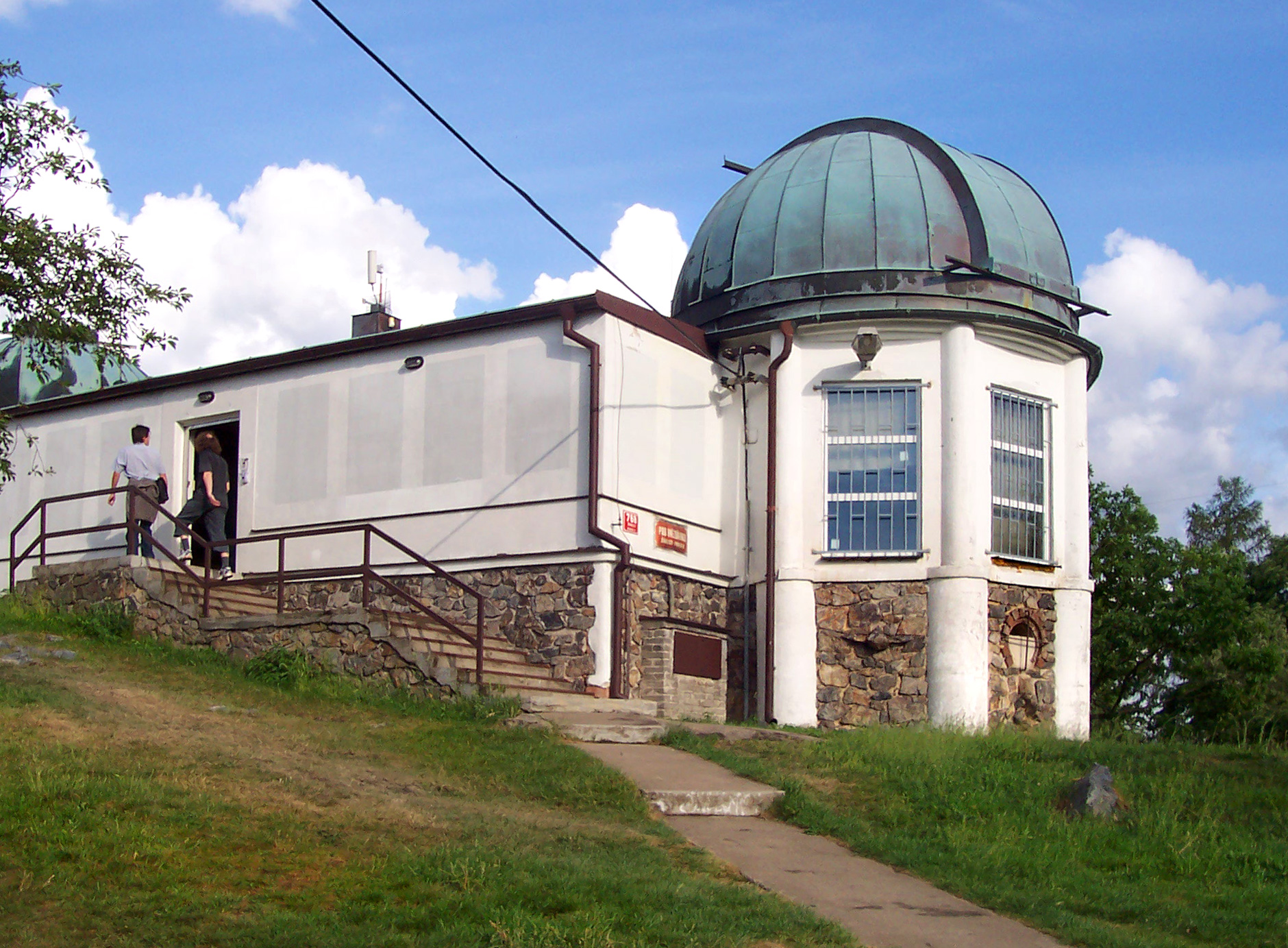
Observatory northwest facade

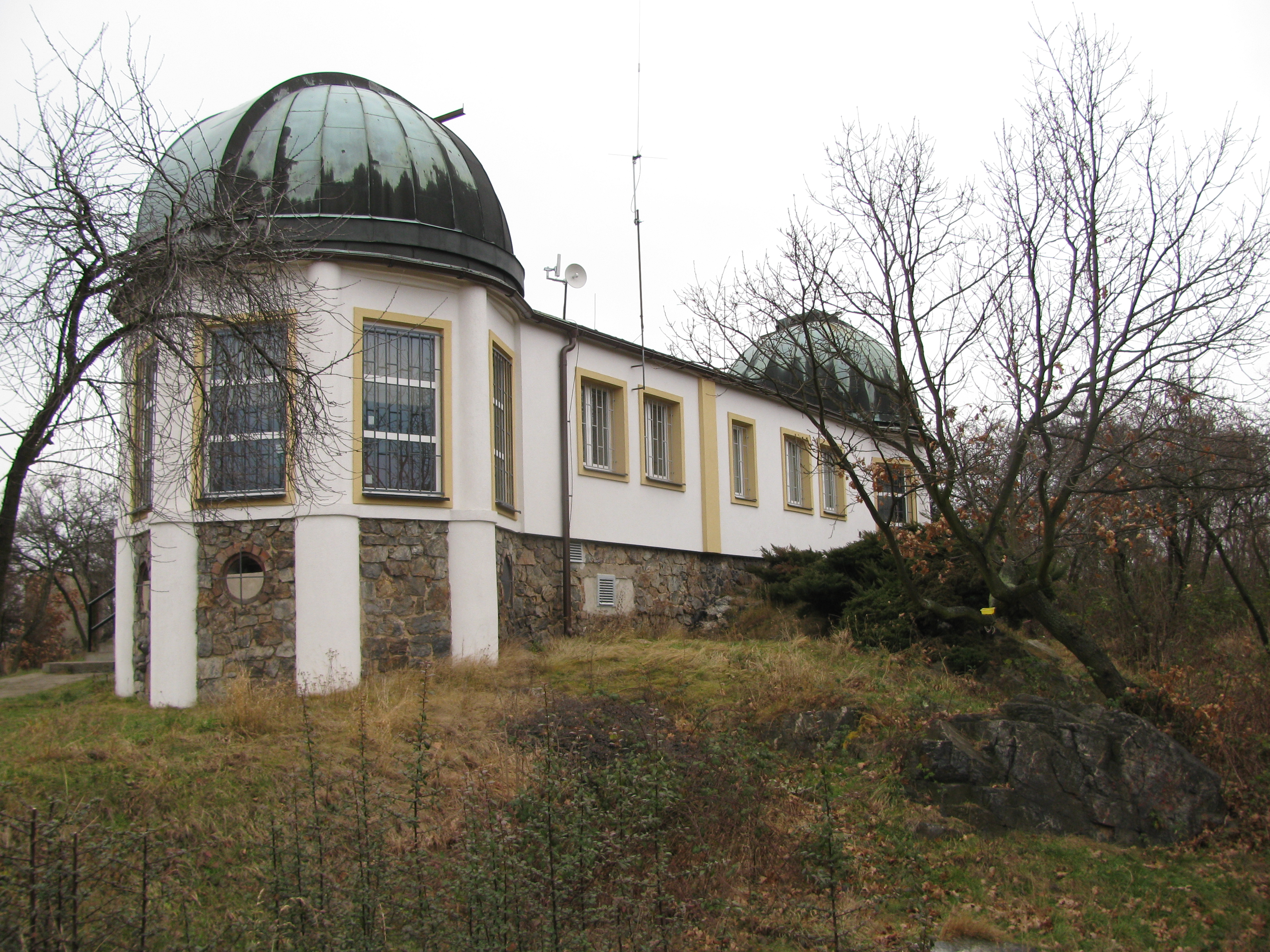
Observatory northwest facade

== See also ==
- List of astronomical observatories
