= Amusement park at Prague Fairground =

Park in Prague, Czech Republic

- Interactive map of Amusement park at Prague Fairground
- Location: Prague, Czech Republic
- Coordinates: 50.109298°N 14.428021°E
- Owner: Kočka, s. r. o.

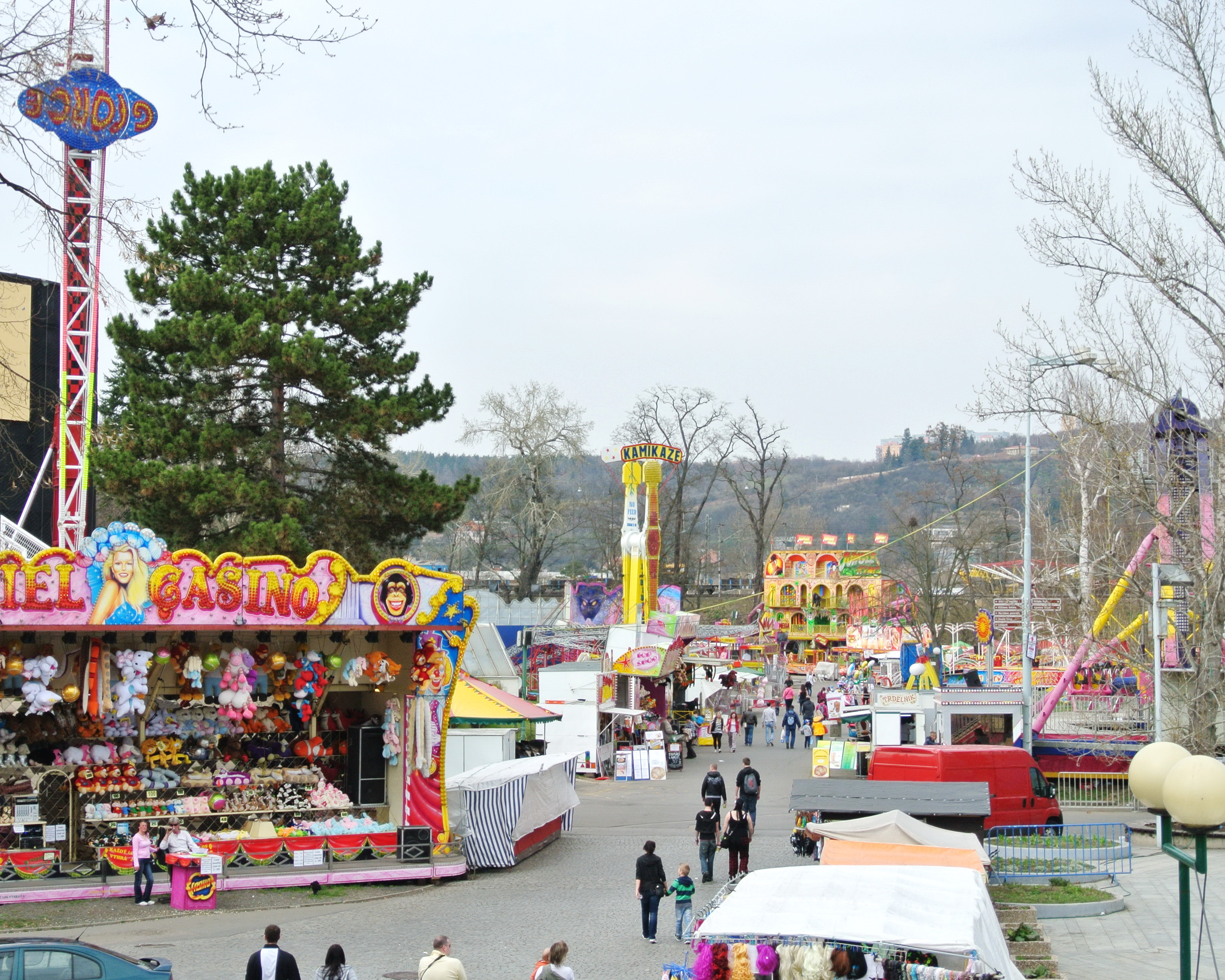
St. Matthew's Fair

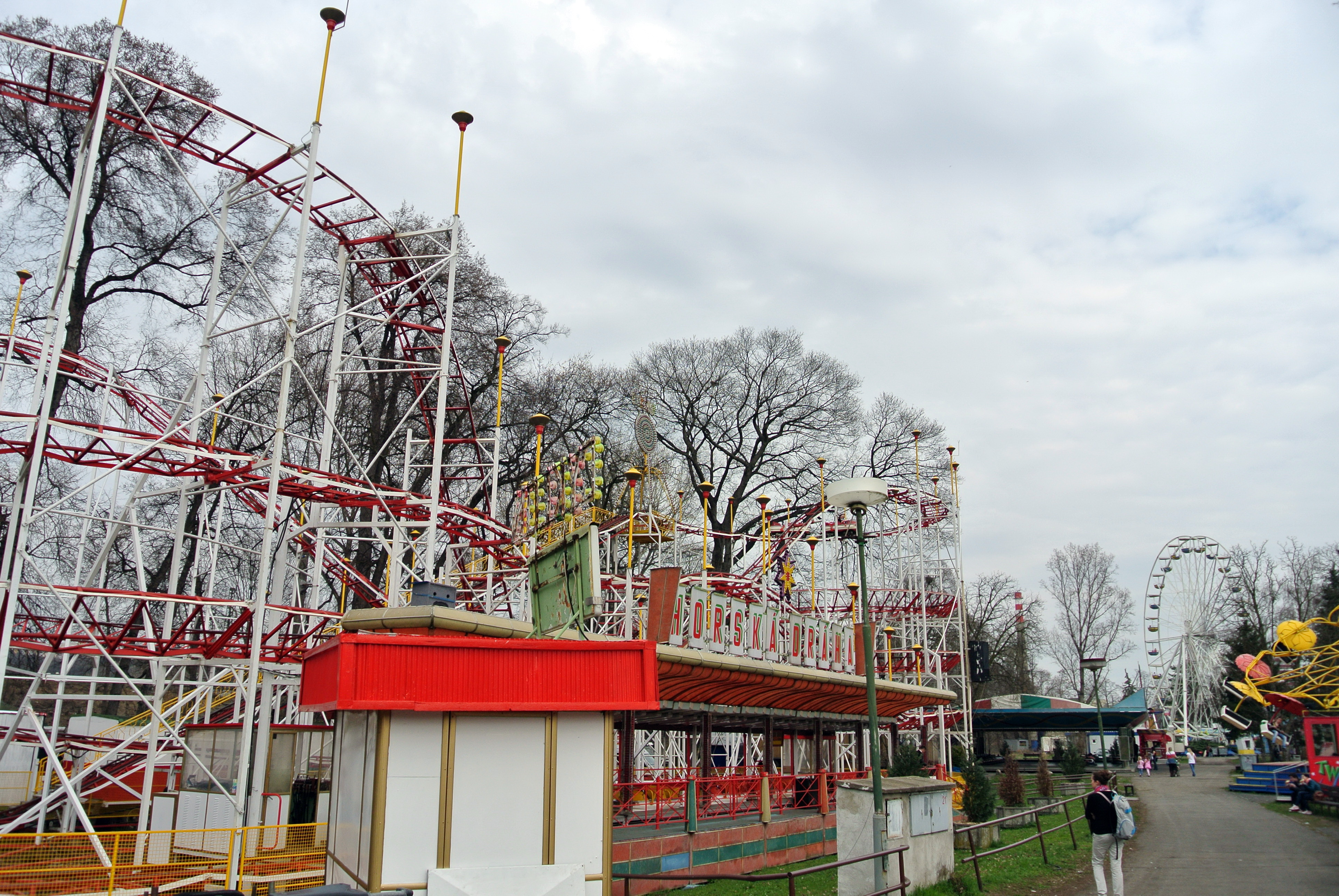
Roller coaster

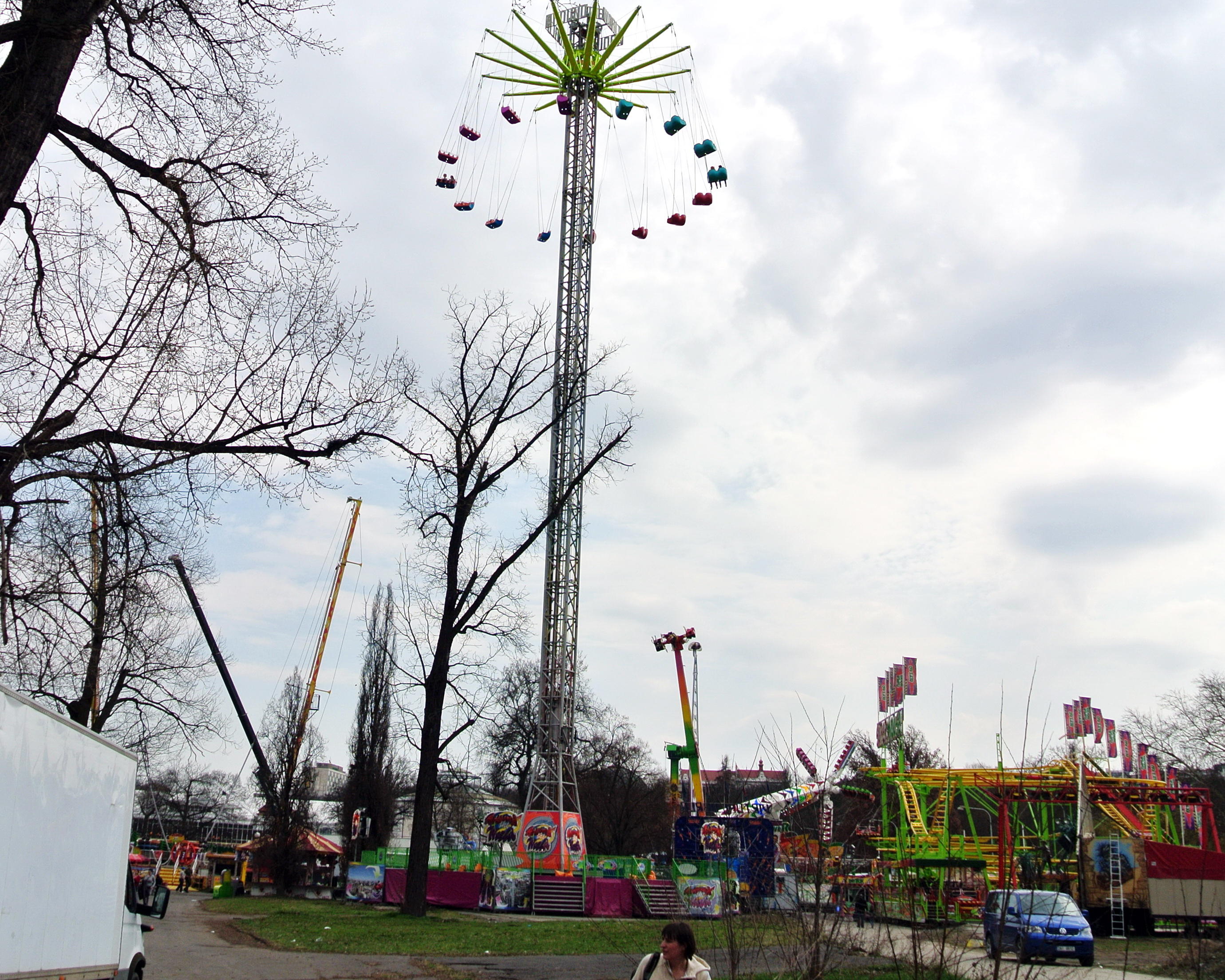
Attractions at Matthew's Fair

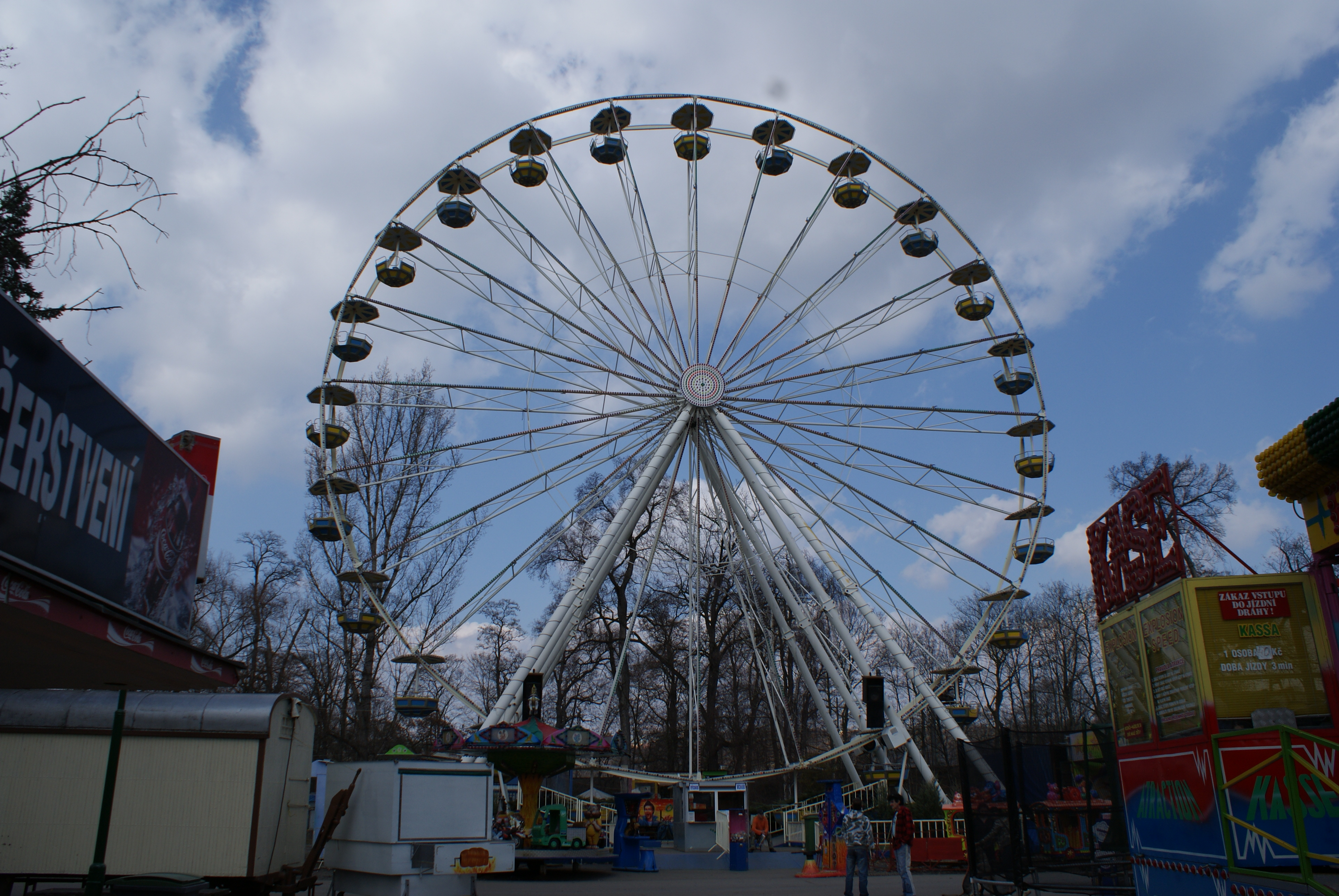
Ferris wheel

Amusement park in Prague (mostly known under the traditional name Lunapark, which is a common name of amusement parks in Czech), is situated in the territory of the Prague Fairground Výstaviště Praha in Prague-Bubeneč, nearby Holešovice. It was one of the few grounds in the Czech Republic that permanently hosted amusement attractions like roller coaster and ferris wheel, however, since 2018, those two permanent attractions were removed and are present only during the funfairs seasons. The park host funfairs in spring and autumn seasons.

== Fairs ==
Matějská pouť ('St. Matthew's Fair') is usually held from end of February to April and Václavská podzimní pouť ('Wenceslaus Autumn Fair') from September to October. The Matějská pouť is the most popular and biggest funfair in Czech Republic and host attractions like the Hammer Booster which is 60 meters high and is the highest in Europe and other around 130 attractions. Amusement park is closed from the beginning of November to the end of February.

== History ==
St. Matthew's Fair (Matějská pouť) has very old tradition, which dates back to 1595, originally as the pilgrimage of Saint Matthew to the Church of St. Matthew in Dejvice (history of the church dates to the 10th century). Since then, the tradition of the Matthew's pilgrimages has been developed. The pilgrimage route started near the current Hradčanská metro station of Prague and led to the Chapel of St. John of Nepomuk, where a parish fair took place. The parish fair gradually moved to the lower sections of the pilgrimage, especially to today's Victory Square (Vítězné náměstí) in Dejvice. During the First Czechoslovak Republic, approximately a quarter of a million people participated in this pilgrimage. However, the development of Dejvice forced this fair to move from this place in the 1960s. After several places (Letná, Modřany, Břevnov) the fair permanently moved to Výstaviště Praha in Bubeneč (nearby Dejvice). Secularization of Czech society caused the religious origins of the fairs to be largely forgotten. In the 1990s, the number of St. Matthew's Fair visitors approached one million. The fairground is now run by the Incheba company, the fair by Kočka company, both owned by Kočka family.
