= Statue of Milan Rastislav Štefánik, Prague =

Statue in Prague, Czech Republic

Statue of Milan Rastislav Štefánik
- Socha Milana Rastislava Štefánika (Czech)
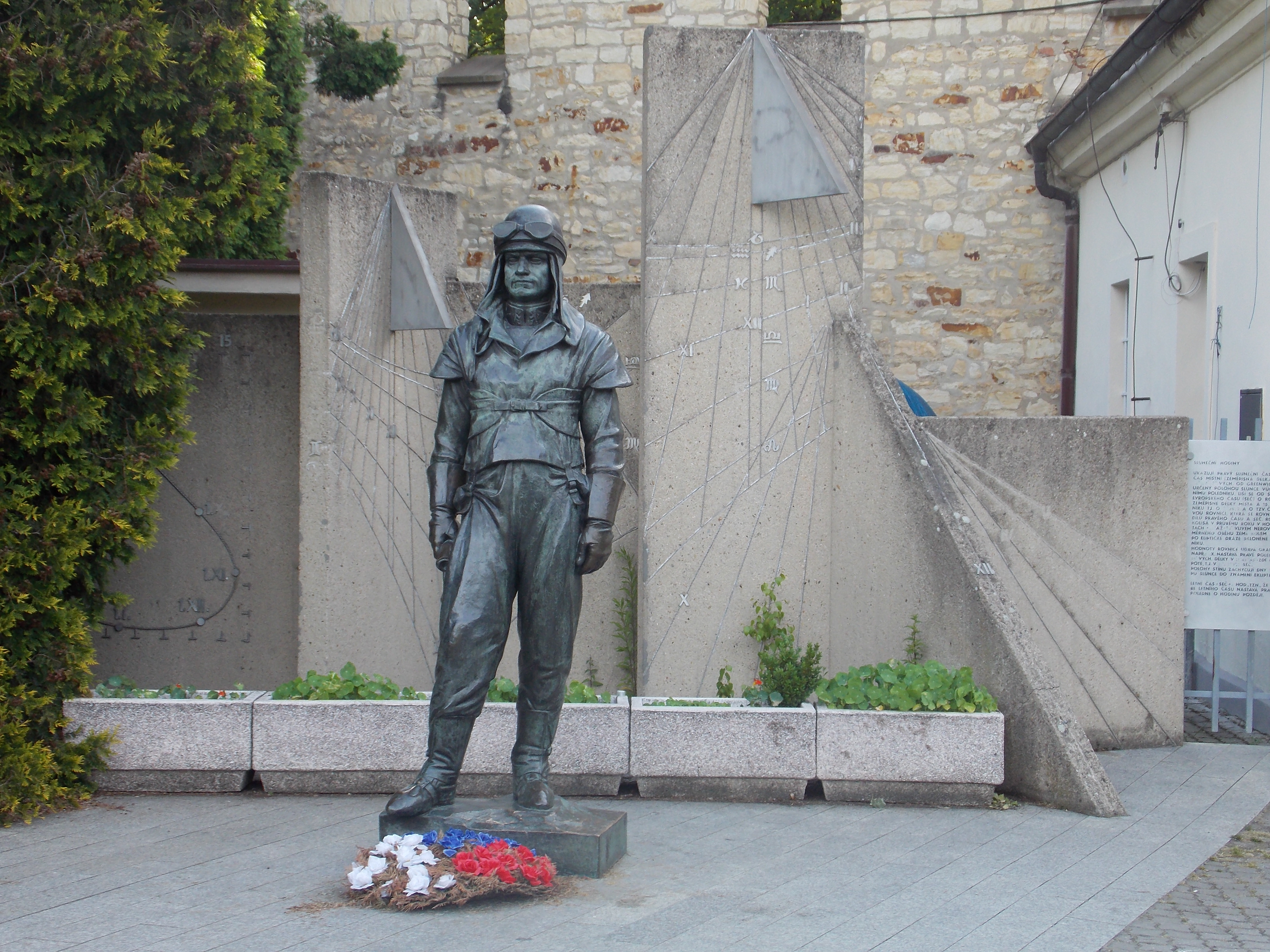
- The statue in 2013
- Type: Sculpture
- Subject: Milan Rastislav Štefánik
- Location: Prague, Czech Republic; 50.081378°N 14.397556°E

A statue of Milan Rastislav Štefánik (Czech: Socha Milana Rastislava Štefánika) by Bohumil Kafka is installed outside Štefánik's Observatory on Petřín in Prague, Czech Republic.

== History ==
The statue was melted down in 1952. The reconstructed statue of Milan Rastislav Štefánik was placed in the vicinity of the observatory on Prague's Petřín Hill in 1994. It is meant to be a smaller version of the statue originally intended to be placed in Bratislava in 1937. It was unveiled in front of the Štefánik’s Observatory on August 30, 1994.
