= HD 185269 b =

Hot-Jupiter exoplanet orbiting the star HD 185269

HD 192699 b
Discovery
- Discovered by: Moutou et al. and Johnson et al.
- Discovery site: Observatoire de Haute Provence and Lick Observatory
- Discovery date: 2006
- Detection method: Doppler spectroscopy

Orbital characteristics
- Semi-major axis: 0.0770±0.0034 AU
- Eccentricity: 0.229±0.014
- Orbital period (sidereal): 6.83776±0.00027 d
- Time of perihelion: 2453154.25±0.11 JD
- Argument of perihelion: 176.2±3.5 º
- Semi-amplitude: 93.3±1.4 m/s
- Star: HD 185269

Physical characteristics
- Mass: ≥1.010±0.014 M_{J}

HD 185269 b is a hot Jupiter extrasolar planet approximately 170 light years away in the constellation of Cygnus. The minimum mass is slightly less than Jupiter and the orbital period is about one week. Most hot Jupiters are thought to have undergone tidal circularization, making the eccentricity of HD 185269 b (e=0.3) unusual. Despite having a large transit probability, none have yet been detected by various photometric monitoring campaigns.

The planet was discovered nearly simultaneously by Johnson et al. as part of a search for planets around subgiants, and by Moutou et al. as part of a search for planets around metal-rich stars (the submission dates to the journals ApJ and Astronomy and Astrophysics were separated by only 9 days).
