= Czech Space Office =

Defunct space agency

- Česká kosmická kancelář
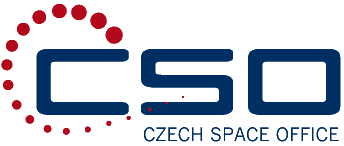

Agency overview
- Abbreviation: CSO
- Formed: 2003
- Dissolved: 2024
- Superseding agency: Czech Space Team
- Type: Space agency
- Headquarters: Prague, Czech Republic
- Administrator: Jan Kolar
- Website: czechspace.cz

The Czech Space Office, CSO (Czech: Česká kosmická kancelář) was the central contact point for the coordination of space science related activities in the Czech Republic. It fulfilled tasks of the national information and advisory centre for the academia on opportunities to enter the international space scene and on space activities in the Czech Republic. It was a non-profit association created in November 2003 that terminated operations in 2024 and asked IAF to be removed as a member on the same year. The bodies of the association were the management board, the supervisory board and the managing director.

== Activities and services ==
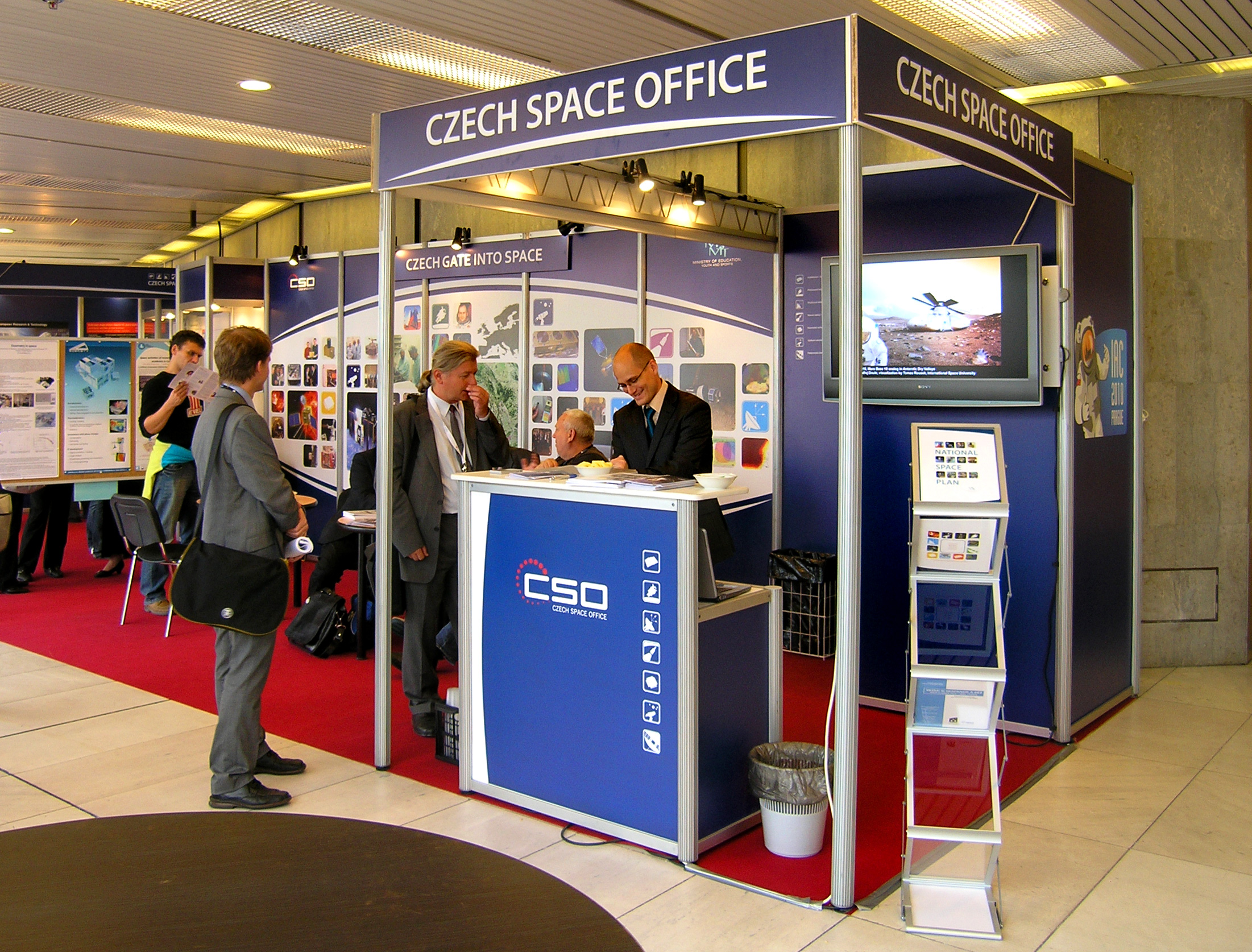
Czech Space Office exposition at the 61st International Astronautical Congress in Prague, Czech Republic

- supporting the participation of Czech researchers in international space collaborations
- providing information and consulting Czech academia concerned in space-related project specification, establishing contacts with cooperation partners and support in technology transfer activities
- membership at IAF, ESTP and EURISY organisations
- student and outreach activities

To reach those objectives, the CSO organises seminars and workshops for professionals from various fields of space activities, as well as educational and public events devoted to space-related topics.

The Office closely cooperates with the Czech Ministry of Education, Youth and Sport. CSO is also a member of the European organization EURISY promoting education and information about space technology and its applications, and a national point of contact for the World Space Week – a worldwide UN space outreach activity.

The CSO's work includes gathering and archiving information about Czech space projects as well as the information on foreign space programmes having importance for the development of Czech space activities. It covers the management of databases of the Czech institutions both academia and industrial.

Moreover, the Czech Space Office also offers information on the Czech space activities and advertises their results inside and outside the country. It arranges seminars and conferences and supports the attendance of Czech institutions in specialized exhibitions dealing with space technologies.

Last but not least, CSO serves as an information point for the general public and academia. It prepares information and advertisement materials describing capacities and potentials of the Czech Republic academia in space, documents about their space activities and their results. It also communicates examples and information on the benefits of the space projects to schools and media.

Finally, the Czech Space Office should not be confused with a Czech space agency. Such an agency does not yet exist, though it is envisaged in the National Space Plan. Until its establishment, the coordination of Czech space activities and the representation of the Czech Republic in ESA and EU space bodies is being coordinated by the Ministry of Transport. See the official space pages of the Ministry of Transport, which also include the government-approved National Space Plan document in English.

== Czech Space Programme ==
The Czech Republic has been actively involved in space activities through its membership in the European Space Agency (ESA) since 2008. The country participates in various ESA missions and projects, contributing to the development of space technologies and research.

Czech companies and research institutions have contributed to the ESA's Proba-3 mission, which is focused on demonstrating new formation flying techniques. The Czech Republic is involved in the Copernicus Programme, Europe's Earth observation programme, providing data for environmental monitoring and disaster management.

The Czech National Space Plan outlines the strategic objectives and priorities for the country's space activities. It focuses on strengthening national capabilities in space technologies and fostering collaboration between academia, industry, and government.

The Czech Republic hosts numerous companies involved in the aerospace sector, such as Frentech Aerospace, OHB Czechspace, World from Space or Honeywell operates the largest R&D center in Europe, located in Brno, contributing to various aerospace projects.

The Czech Space Office places an emphasis on education and outreach. It organizes competitions, workshops, and seminars for students to promote interest in space science and engineering through programs such as the "Czech Space Year".
