= Planetum =

Czech educational institution

- Observatory and Planetarium of capital city Prague
- Planetum – Hvězdárna a planetárium hlavního města Prahy
- Formation: January 1, 1979; 47 years ago
- Headquarters: Královská obora 233, 170 00, Praha 7, Czech Republic
- Coordinates: 50.1054°N 14.4274°E
- Leader: Jakub Rozehnal (since 2018)
- Subsidiaries: Prague Planetarium; Štefánik's Observatory; Ďáblice Observatory
- Website: www.planetum.cz/en/

Planetum (or Observatory and Planetarium of capital city Prague) is a public nonprofit institution funded by the City of Prague dedicated to education and science communication in astronomy and related fields. It brings together Prague Planetarium, Štefánik's Observatory, and Ďáblice Observatory and co-manages the European Space Agency's local education office ESERO Czech Republic. Planetum is member of the Czech Space Team and manages education activities related to spaceflight projects. In 2022, it launched the small satellite Planetum-1.
