= Ďáblice =

- Municipal District of Prague; Cadastral Area of Prague
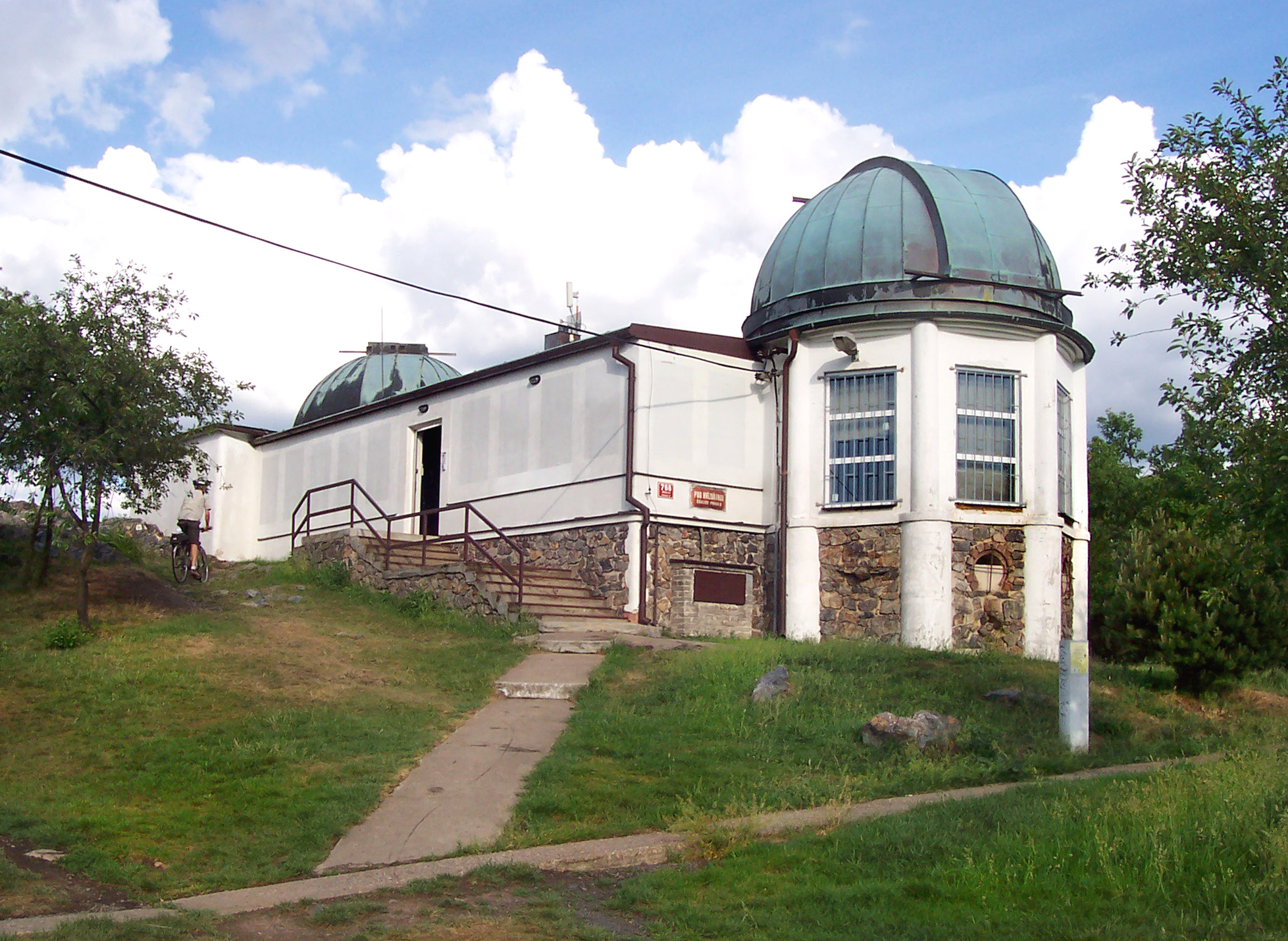
- Observatory in Ďáblice

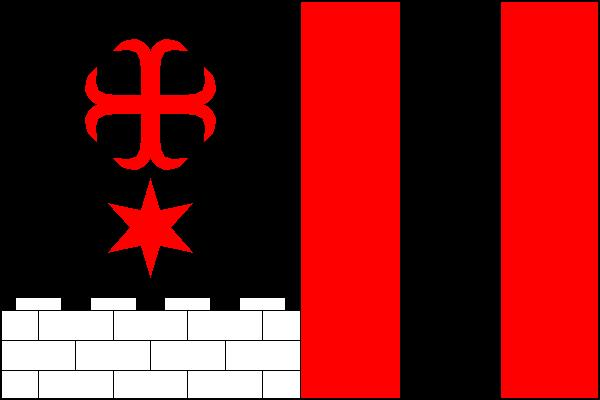
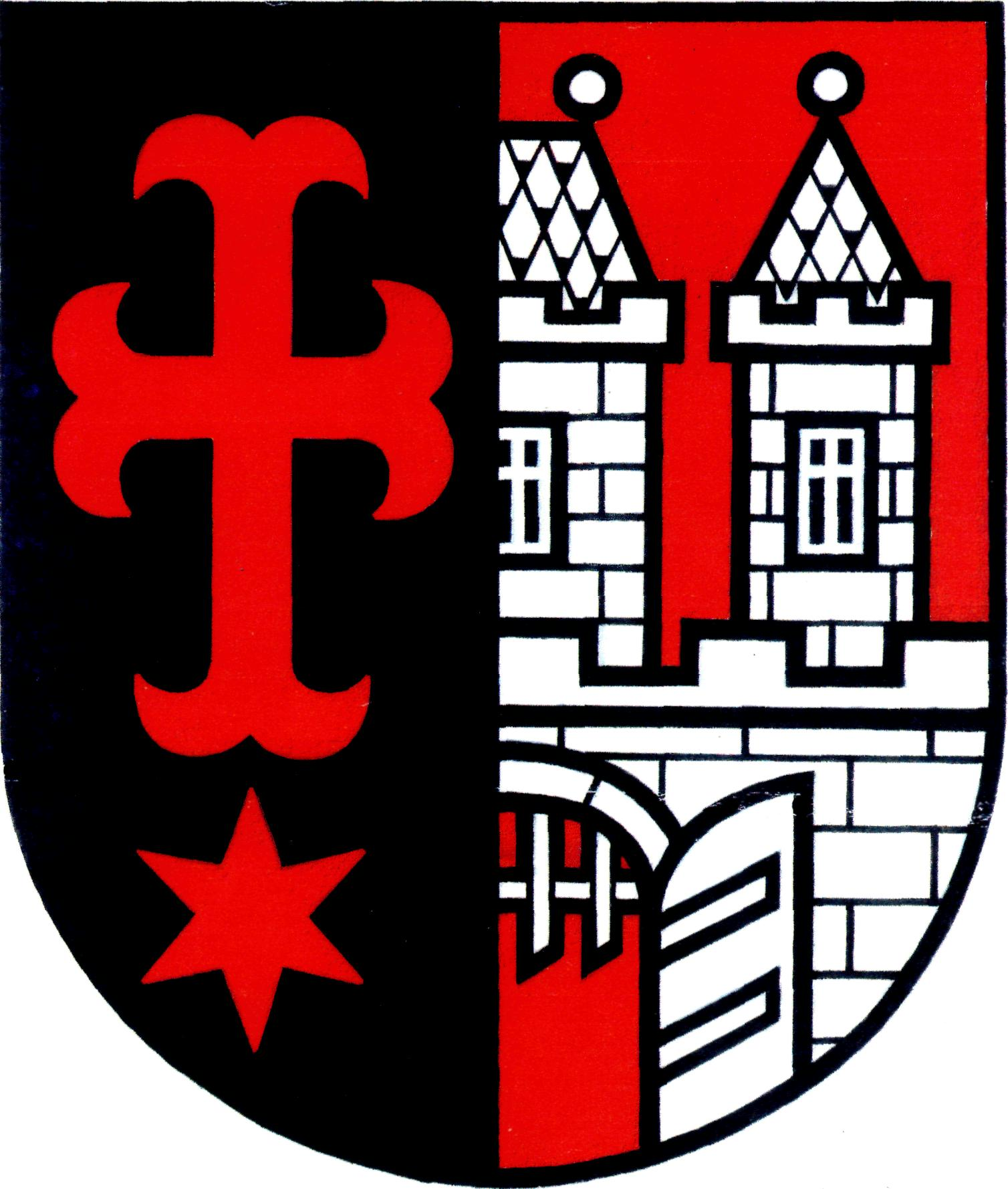
- Flag Coat of arms

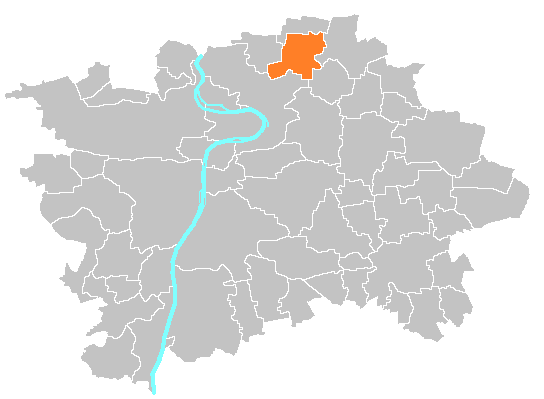
- Location of Ďáblice in Prague
- Coordinates: 50°8′55″N 14°29′10″E
- Country: Czech Republic
- Region: Prague
- District: Prague 8

Government
  - Mayor: Danuše Ševčíková

Area
  - Total: 7.38 km^{2} (2.85 sq mi)

Population (2021)
  - Total: 3,750
  - Density: 508/km^{2} (1,320/sq mi)
- Time zone: UTC+1 (CET)
  - Summer (DST): UTC+2 (CEST)
- Postal code: 182 00
- Website: http://www.dablice.com

Ďáblice is a municipal district (městská část) and cadastral area (katastrální území) in Prague. It is located in the northern part of the city. As of 2021, there were 3,750 inhabitants living in Ďáblice.

The first written record of Ďáblice is from the 13th century. The village became part of Prague in 1968. It is the site of the eponymous Ďáblice Observatory, built in 1956.

== Demographics ==
Historical population
Year	Pop.	±%
1869	749	—
1880	836	+11.6%
1890	990	+18.4%
1900	1,256	+26.9%
1910	1,700	+35.4%
1921	1,694	−0.4%
1930	4,344	+156.4%
1950	3,954	−9.0%
1961	3,639	−8.0%
1970	3,503	−3.7%
1980	2,537	−27.6%
1991	2,113	−16.7%
2001	2,196	+3.9%
2011	3,539	+61.2%
2021	3,750	+6.0%
Source: Censuses
