= Stromovka =

Park in Prague-Bubeneč, Czech Republic

- Stromovka
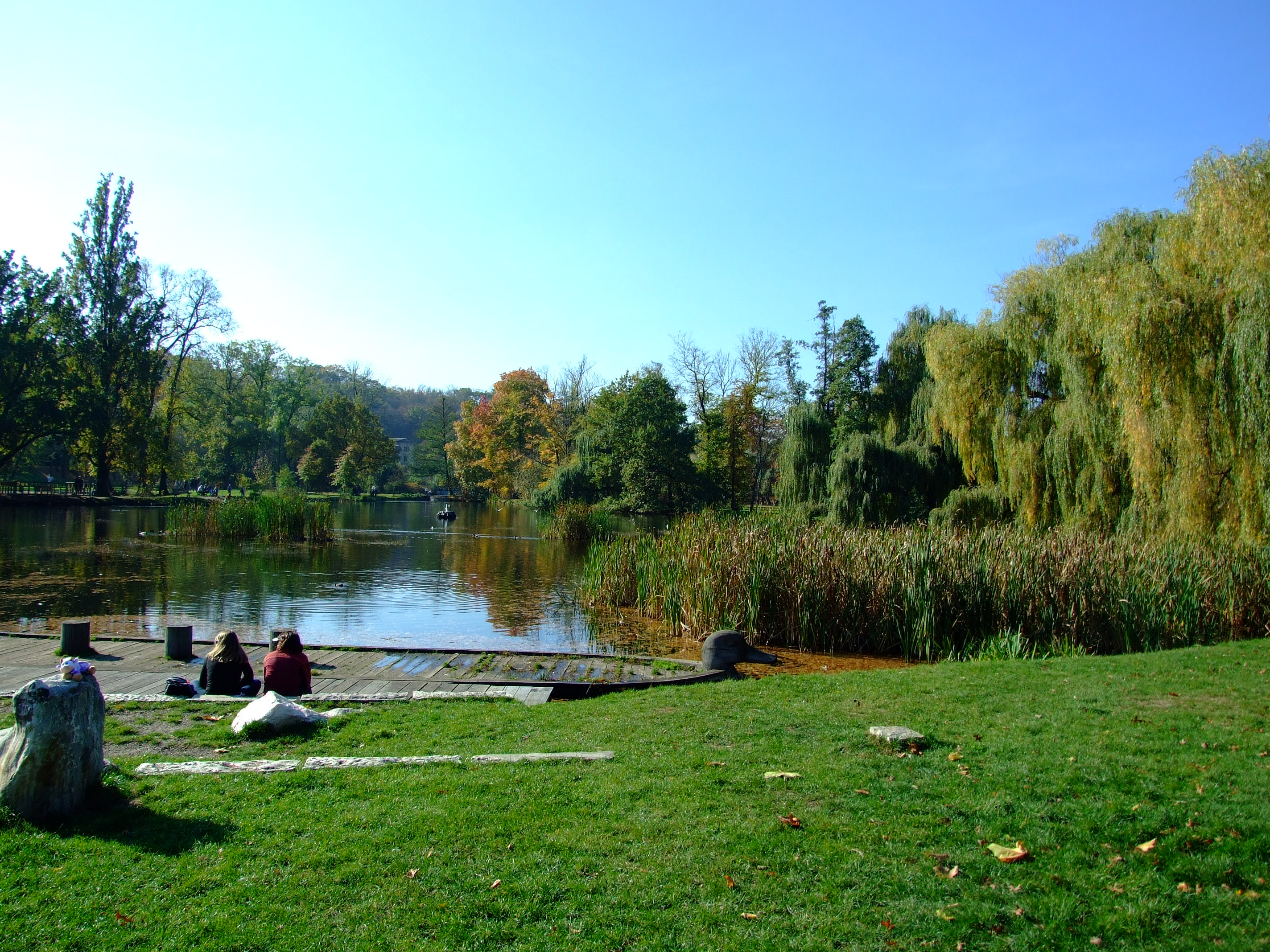
- Pond in the park
- Interactive map of Stromovka
- Type: Public park
- Location: Prague, Czech Republic
- Coordinates: 50.1064°N 14.4194°E

Stromovka (Royal Game Reserve) is a large park in the Bubeneč district of Prague. It sits on the floodplain of the river Vltava. At present, it spreads over an area of 95 hectares. It was established in the thirteenth century as a game reserve for the nearby summerhouse. At the beginning of the 19th century, it was converted into a park, which later in the 19th and 20th centuries was reduced by the construction of railways, the building of the Academy of Fine Arts and the Planetarium, a ship canal, and last but not least by the construction of the exhibition ground. The park is maintained as an English landscape garden. It is protected as a natural monument as well as a cultural monument.

A shopping mall named Centrum Stromovka opened in 2019 adjacent to the park, in Veletržní street. Centrum Stromovka, named after the park, is a convenience-based shopping mall of 15,000 sq m and 84 units.
