= Coudé Auxiliary Telescope =

Telescope near San Jose, California, US

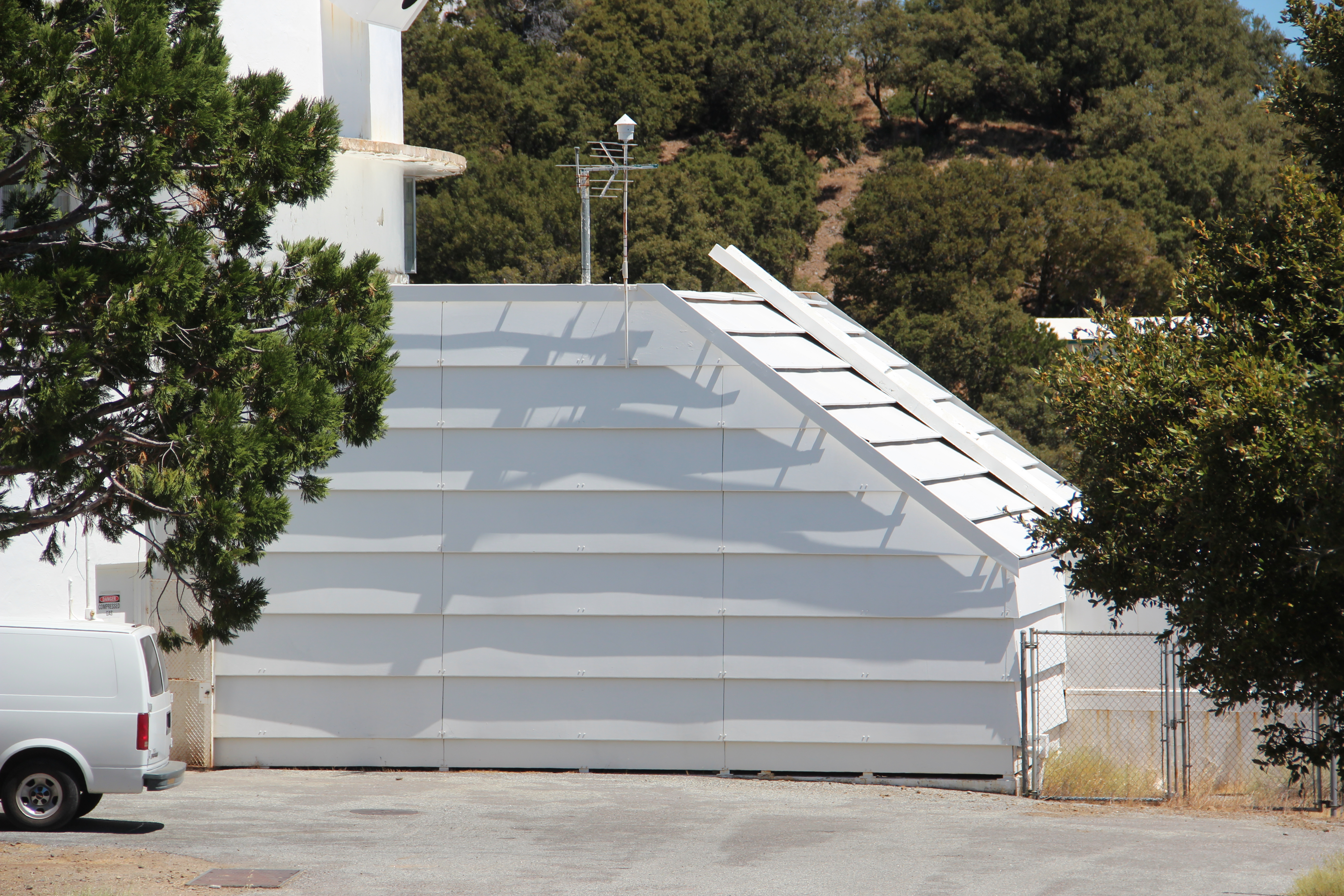
- Alternative names: Coude Auxiliary Telescope
- Location(s): California, Pacific States Region
- Coordinates: 37°20′34″N 121°38′13″W
- Diameter: 0.6 m (2 ft 0 in)
- Location of Coudé Auxiliary Telescope
- Related media on Commons

The Coudé Auxiliary Telescope (CAT) is a coudé focus telescope located at the Lick Observatory near San Jose, California, south of Shane Dome, Tycho Brahe Peak.

The Coudé Auxiliary Telescope, built in 1969, is a 0.6m (24-inch) reflecting telescope in a stationary position at a fixed focus. The CAT is generally used for observation of brighter stars, since it collects less light than the 120-inch Shane.

== See also ==
- La Silla Observatory which has a 1.4m Coudé Auxiliary Telescope on the ESO 3.6 m Telescope
- Ďáblice Observatory which uses a Coudé-style telescope to improve accessibility
- List of astronomical observatories
