= Prague Planetarium =

Planetarium in Prague, Czech Republic

- Planetárium Praha
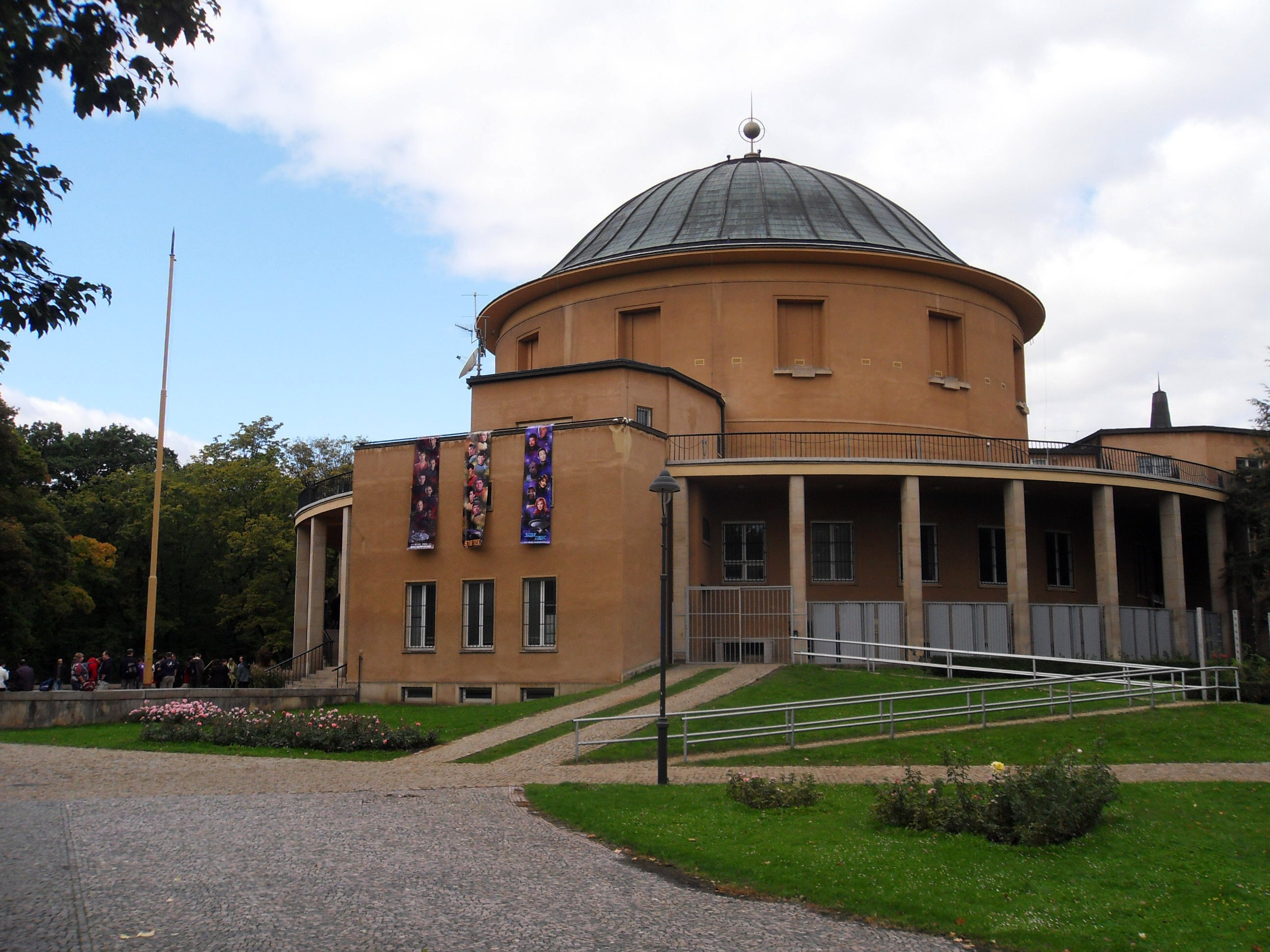
- Planetárium Praha in 2012
- Interactive fullscreen map
- Established: 1960; 66 years ago
- Location: Královská obora 233, Prague 7, Czech Republic, 170 21
- Coordinates: 50.1054°N 14.4274°E
- Website: https://www.planetum.cz/planetarium-praha/

Prague Planetarium (Czech: Planetárium Praha), part of Planetum, is a planetarium located in Bubeneč, Prague, Czech Republic, next to the Stromovka park and Výstaviště Praha. Its dome is one of the largest in the world, measuring 23.5 m in a diameter. It was opened on 20 November 1960. It is equipped with both optomechanical and digital projectors. The planetarium presents tens of prepared shows and is open every day except Fridays.

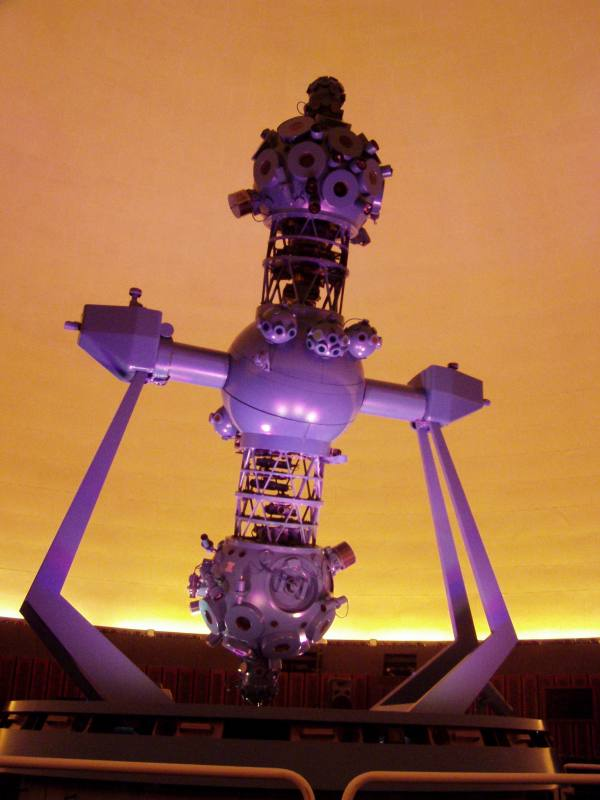
Cosmorama projector

The optomechanical Cosmorama, installed in 1991, is made by Carl Zeiss AG and it is the last still working device of this type. It is currently placed on moving arms in order to be able to hide and not to shadow a modern digital projection. The digital projection system SkySkan Definiti installed in 2009 and modernized in 2014 has the highest resolution in Europe, its six Sony SRX T-615 projectors are capable to create an 8K picture.
