= Výstaviště Praha =

Coordinates: 50°06′17″N 14°25′51″E

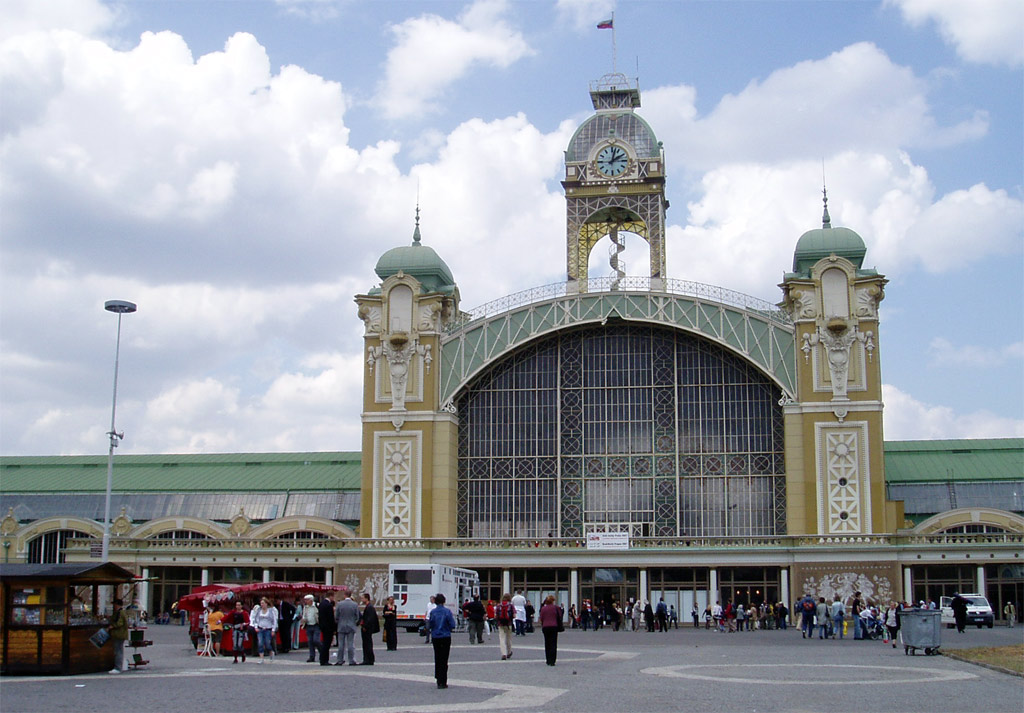
Industrial Palace

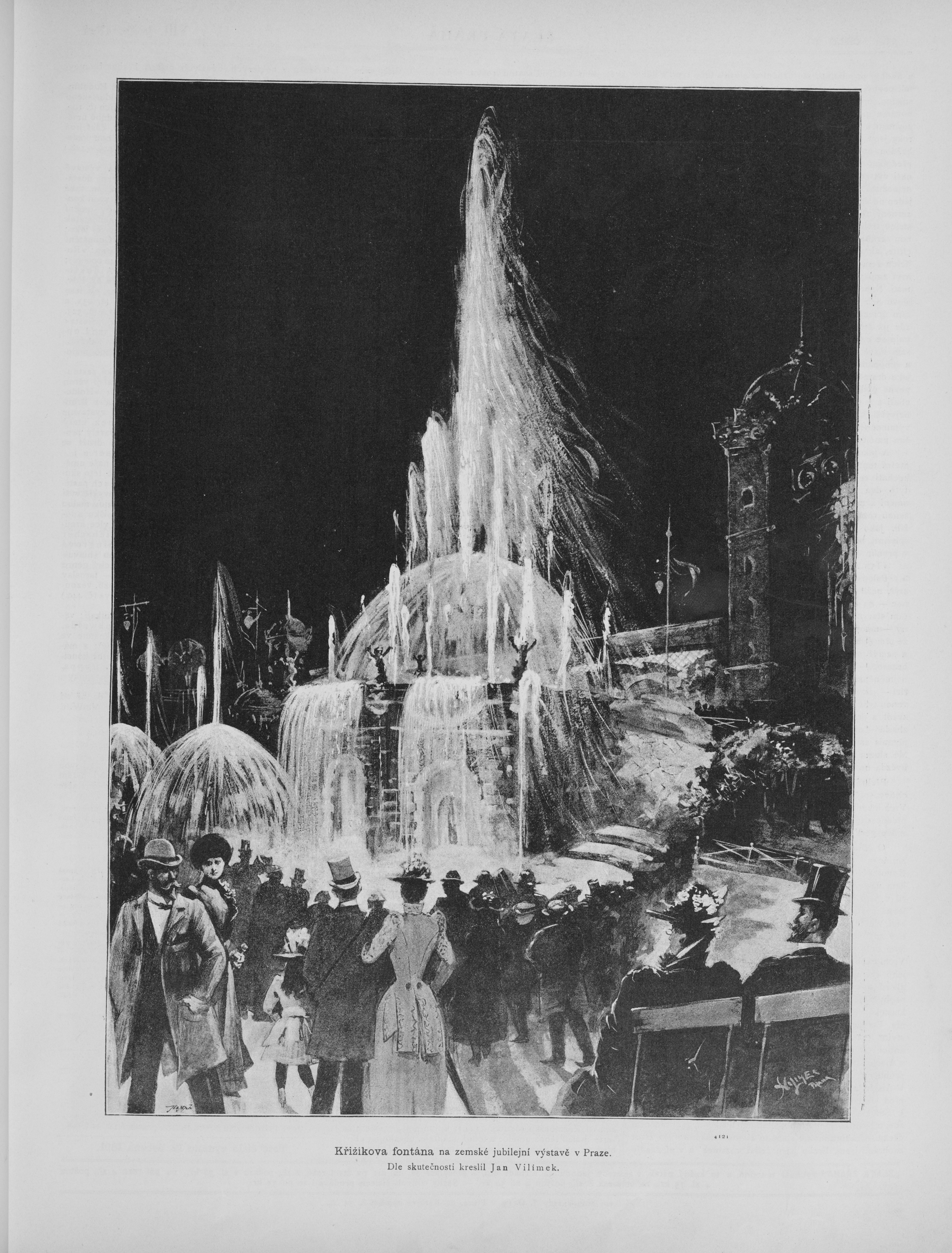
Křižík's light fountain in 1891

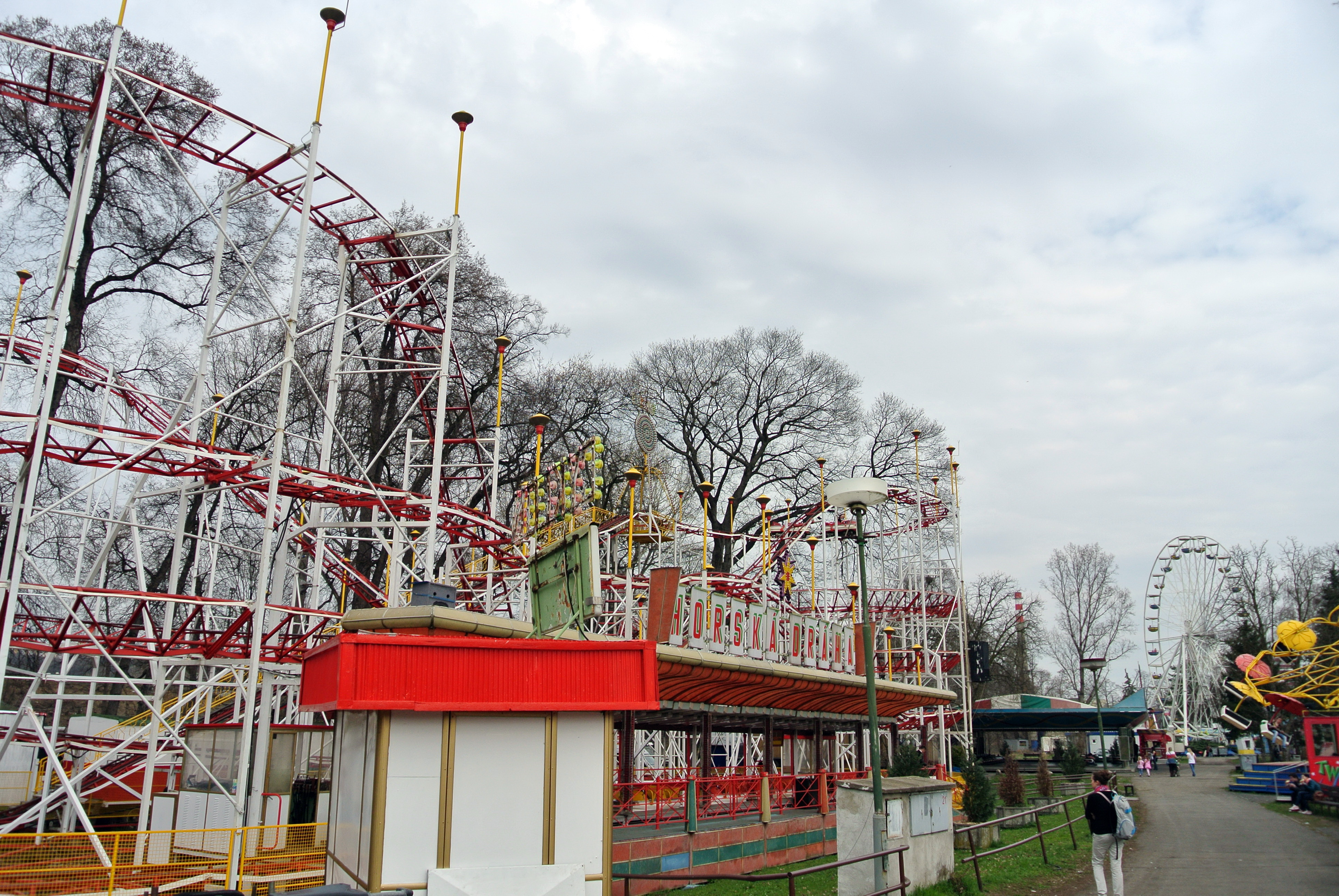
Roller coaster in Lunapark

Výstaviště in Prague is an exhibition ground which is used for exhibitions, concerts and other cultural events, founded in 1891. It is located in Bubeneč near the metro station on Metro line C Nádraží Holešovice. In the immediate area on the west side there is a large park Stromovka and a planetarium, on the eastern Sportovní hala Fortuna, former home hall of the club HC Sparta Praha. The dominant building on its premises is the Industrial Palace, also found here are the Křižík's Light fountain, Lapidarium of the National Museum, World of the Oceans aquarium, Pyramid Theatre and panorama of the Battle of Lipany by Luděk Marold (the largest image in the Czech Republic). The Northern part of the area has an Amusement park (Lunapark), where St. Matthew's Fair takes place in the spring.

== Industrial Palace ==
The Industrial Palace (Czech: Průmyslový palác) is an Art Nouveau (or Historicism) building, built by Bedřich Münzberger in 1891, which is used for exhibition purposes, but also for various cultural events. It is a glass building with steel construction and is divided into 3 independent parts, left and right wing and a middle hall with 51 m high clock tower. In 2008 the Palace was engulfed in a fire and the left wing burned.

== Křižík's light fountain ==
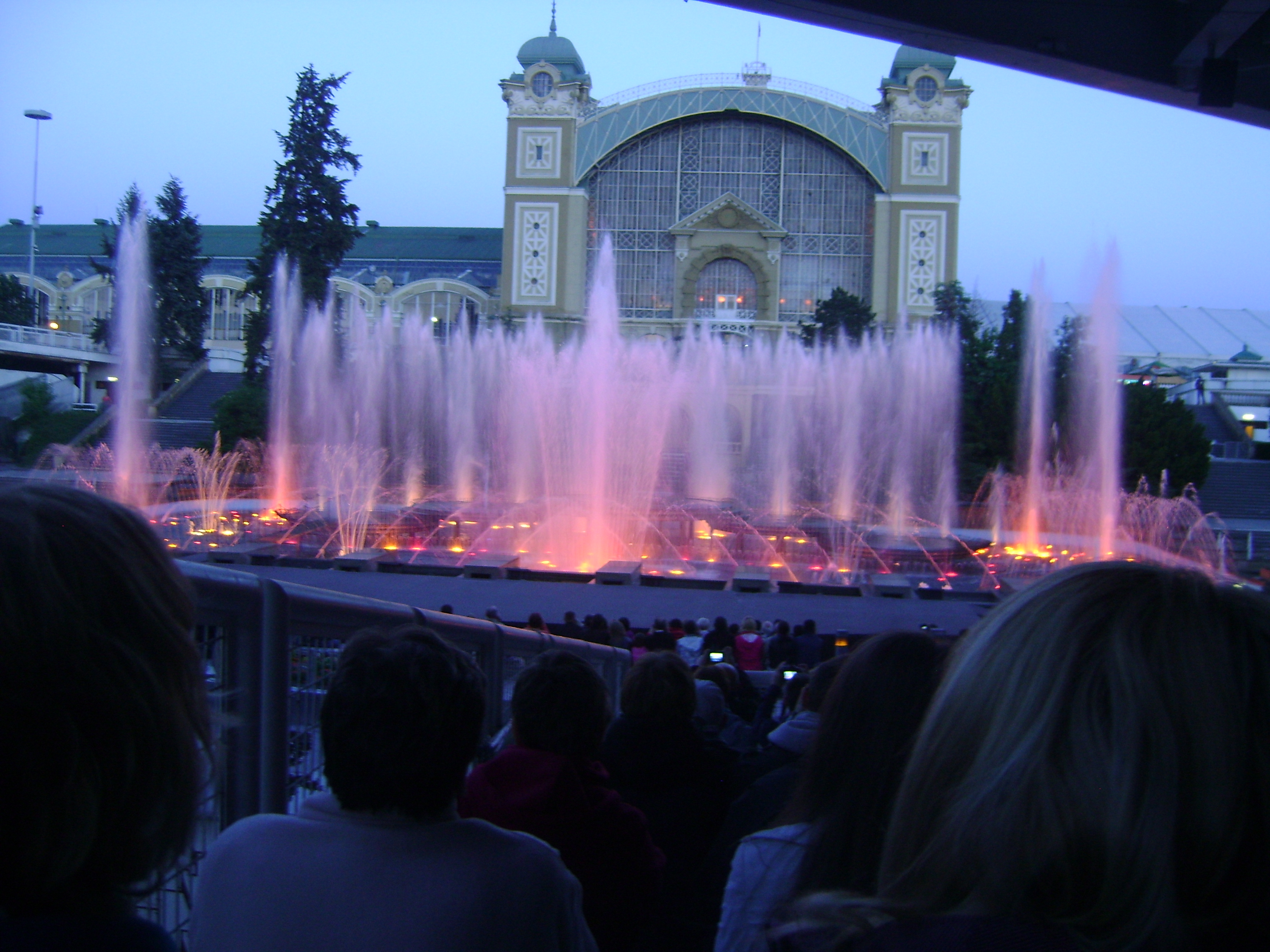
Křižík's light fountain

Křižík's fountain (Czech: Křižíkova fontána), or Křižík's light fountain, is an illuminated and musical fountain used for cultural events. The fountain was built by František Křižík in 1891 on the occasion of the World Exhibition. The Fountain was rebuilt in the 1920s by architect Z.Stašek. The bottom of the fountain plate is equipped with 1,300 multicolored reflectors and water circuits composed of more than 2 kilometers of pipes with almost 3,000 nozzles. Now it is amplified by the classical and pop music and other art projects. In 2017-2021, the fountain was closed for reconstruction.
