= Bubeneč =

District of Prague, Czechia

- Cadastral Area of Prague
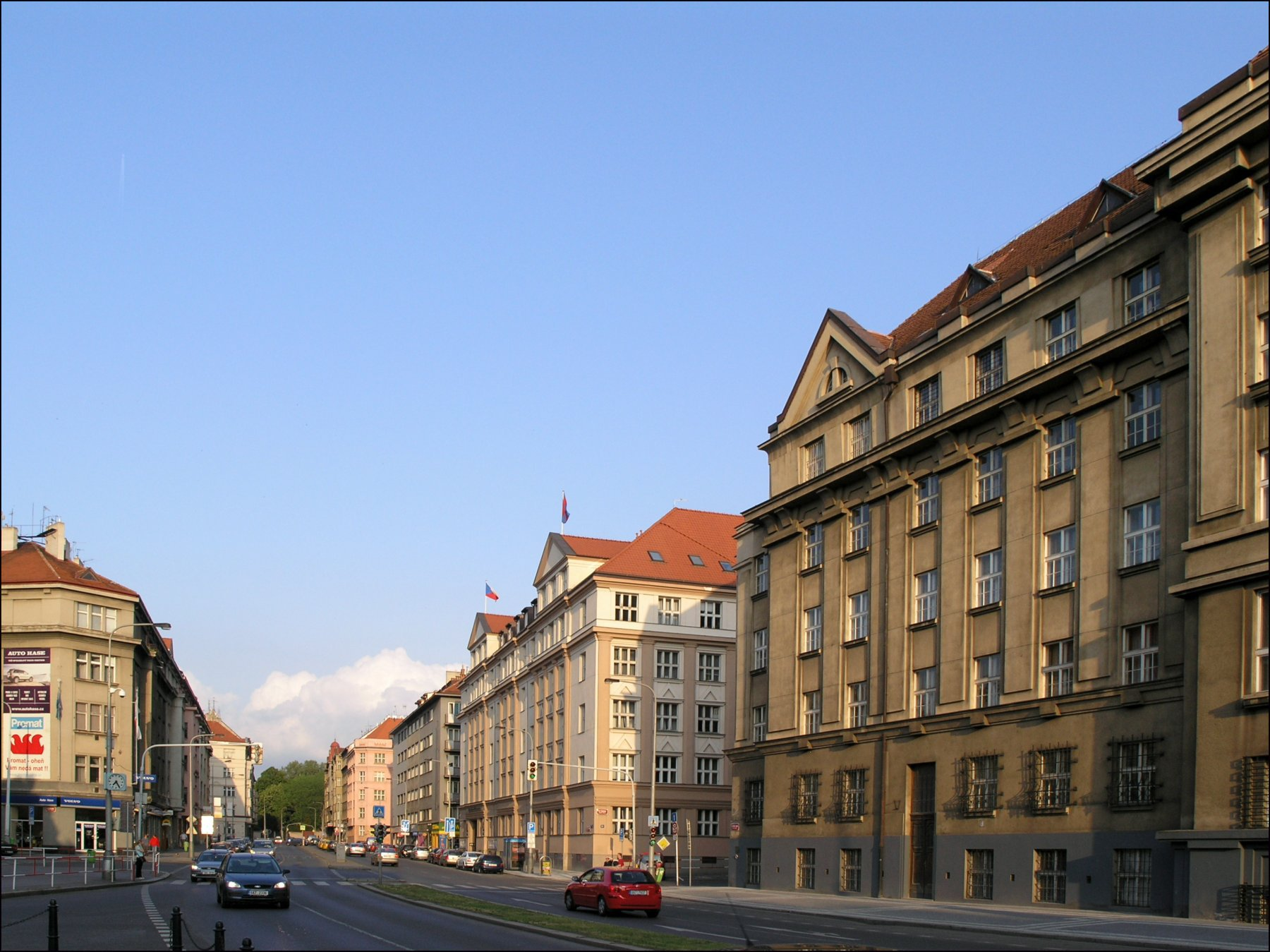
- Československé armády street at Bubeneč

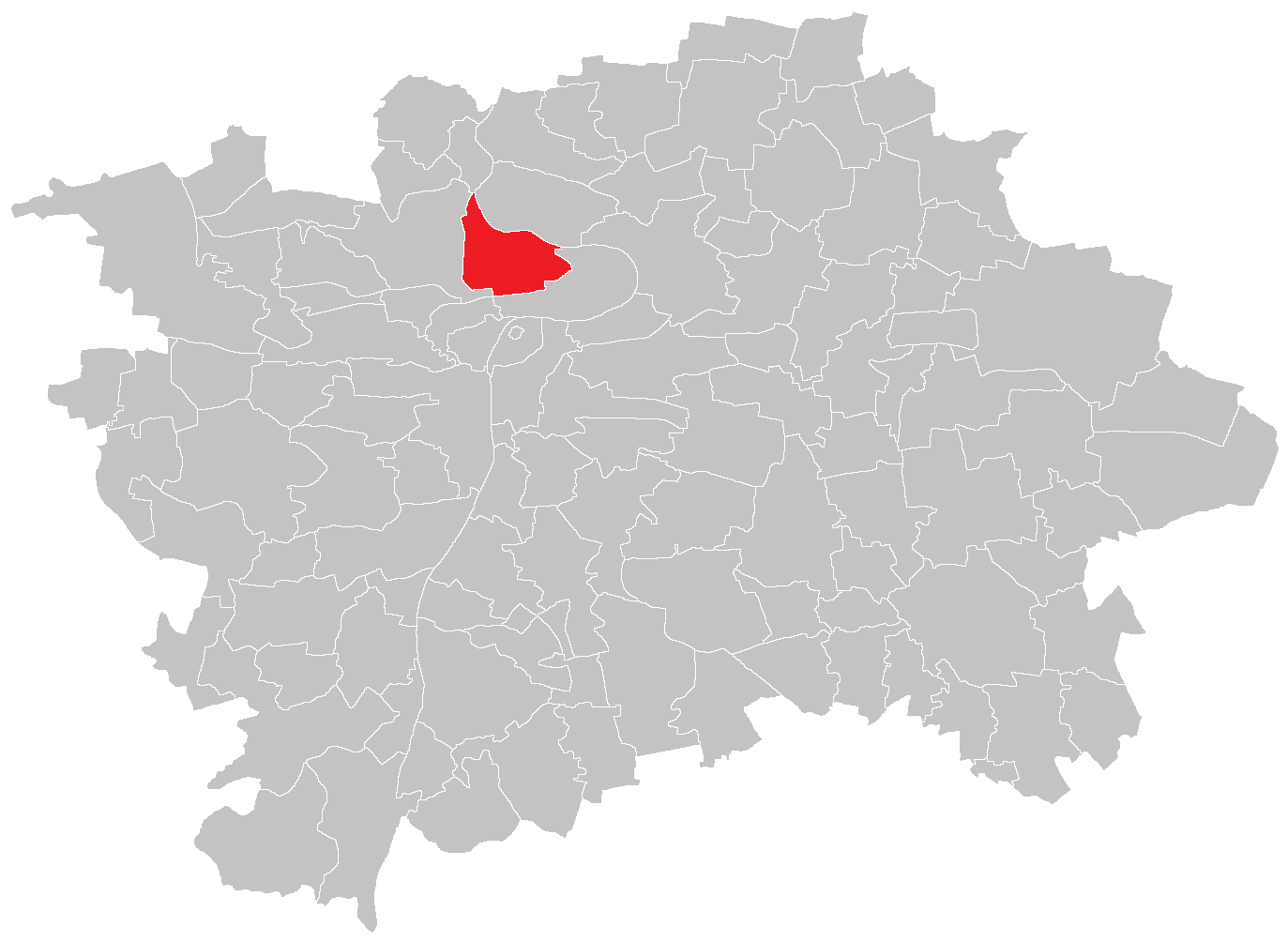
- Location of Bubeneč in Prague
- Coordinates: 50°6′17″N 14°23′54″E
- Country: Czech Republic
- Region: Prague
- District: Prague 6, Prague 7

Area
  - Total: 4.44 km^{2} (1.71 sq mi)

Population (2021)
  - Total: 21,989
  - Density: 4,950/km^{2} (12,800/sq mi)
- Time zone: UTC+1 (CET)
  - Summer (DST): UTC+2 (CEST)

Bubeneč is a district in the north-west of Prague. 52% of the district is in Prague 7, but most of the built-up area is in Prague 6. AC Sparta Prague football club and their stadium epet ARENA is situated at the south-eastern edge of Bubeneč, and the district also covers Stromovka park (Královská obora) and a convention centre Výstaviště. The name Bubeneč is masculine, although Czech grammar rules also allow its use as a feminine.

Bubeneč is sometimes informally called "Little Moscow" due to the high concentration of various entities and buildings related to the Russian government and private businesses, including the vast Embassy of Russia and the office of Rossotrudnichestvo.

== History ==
The earliest mention of Bubeneč is in 1197. On 26 October 1904, Bubeneč acquired city status. Bubeneč was a city between 1904 and 1921, when it was merged with Prague. The area attracted large numbers of Russian immigrants in the period before World War II.

In 1980 the controversial Statue of Ivan Konev was erected there. The monument was finally removed on 3 April 2020.

== Demographics ==
Historical population

Year	Pop.	±%
1869	1,083	—
1880	1,394	+28.7%
1890	1,698	+21.8%
1900	5,538	+226.1%
1910	10,657	+92.4%
1921	15,830	+48.5%
1930	30,514	+92.8%
1950	36,382	+19.2%

Year	Pop.	±%
1961	39,121	+7.5%
1970	34,953	−10.7%
1980	29,660	−15.1%
1991	25,415	−14.3%
2001	22,296	−12.3%
2011	20,647	−7.4%
2021	21,989	+6.5%

Source: Censuses

== See also ==
- Boris Nemtsov Square, Prague
