= Štefánik's Observatory =

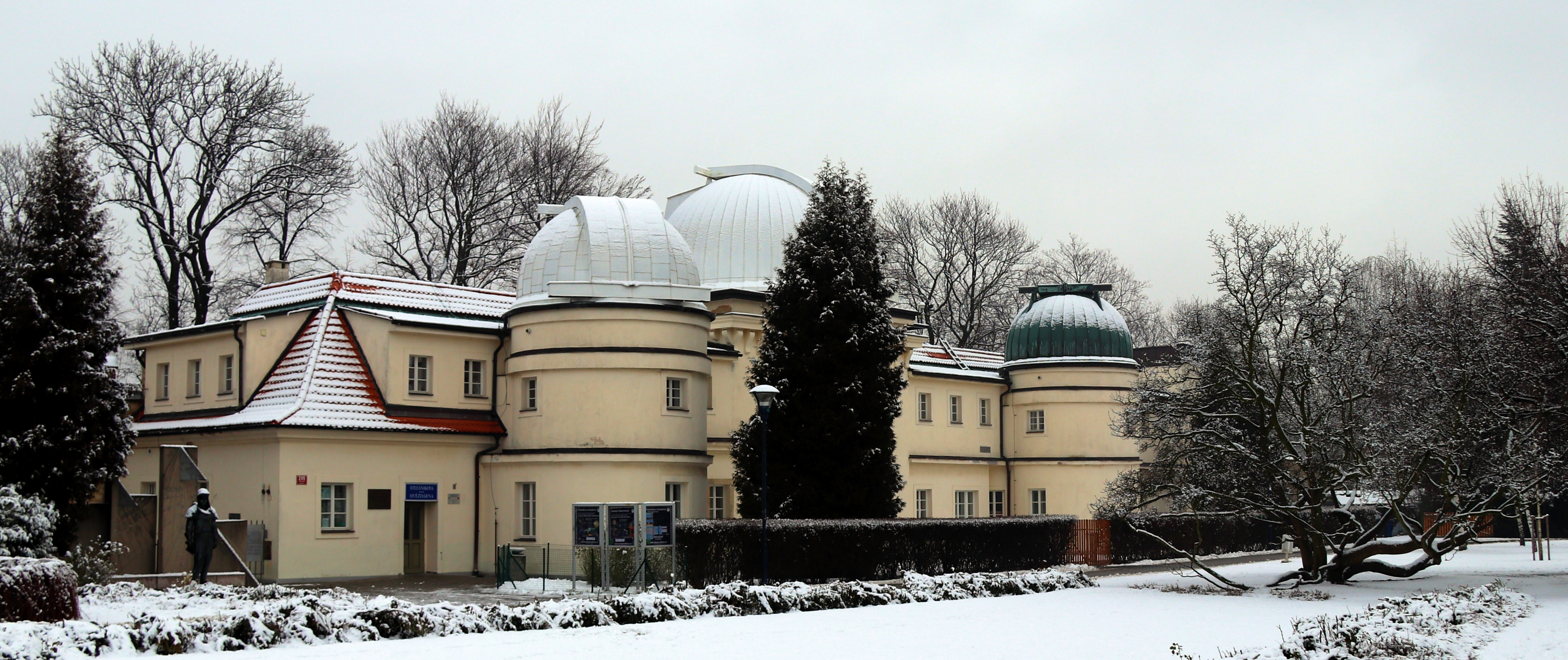
- Štefánik's Observatory
- Named after: Milan Rastislav Štefánik
- Organization: Planetum
- Observatory code: 541
- Location: Hradčany, Prague 1, Czech Republic
- Coordinates: 50°04′52″N 14°23′54″E
- Altitude: 321 m (1,053 ft)
- Established: 1928
- Website: www.planetum.cz/stefanikova-hvezdarna/
- Related media on Commons

Štefánik's Observatory (Czech: Štefánikova hvězdárna, obs. code: 541), sometimes called the Prague Observatory, is an astronomical observatory on Petřín hill in the center of Prague founded in 1928 and named after Slovak astronomer Milan Rastislav Štefánik. In modern times, the observatory specializes in the popularization of astronomy and related natural sciences.

== Overview ==
The observatory was built by the Czech Astronomical Society in 1928 after a period of fundraising that began after the group's formation in 1917. The observatory was constructed in the center of Prague, at the Hunger Wall on Petřín hill, an area built during the reign of Charles IV in the 14th century. The building has three domes and an observation house with a retractable roof.

Due to damage from bombardment during World War II, the modern building's exterior appearance dates to extensive renovation work undertaken in the 1970s. Telescope equipment and internal exhibition spaces were modernized in the early 2000s.

The observatory offers public viewing of the night sky and daytime observations of the Sun's surface, coronal mass ejections, and solar prominences. There are also tours of telescopes and other equipment, and permanent exhibitions about astronomy and the observatory's history.

== Technology ==
The largest telescope is a double-refractor astrograph made in 1905 by Zeiss and purchased from the estate of Rudolf König, a selenographer from Vienna, in 1928. Tomáš Masaryk, the first president of Czechoslovakia, contributed funds for its purchase. The 5.5 ton (4,990 kg) telescope has three refractors and has functioned as the main telescope at Štefánik's Observatory since 1930, occupying its central dome. The Zeiss telescope was renovated between 2022 and 2024, but cosmetic damage from WW2 was kept preserved.

The observatory also possesses a mirror Maksutov-Cassegrain telescope installed in the western dome in 1976. The eastern dome of the observatory is equipped with a 40 cm mirror telescope by Meade Instruments.

== Gallery ==
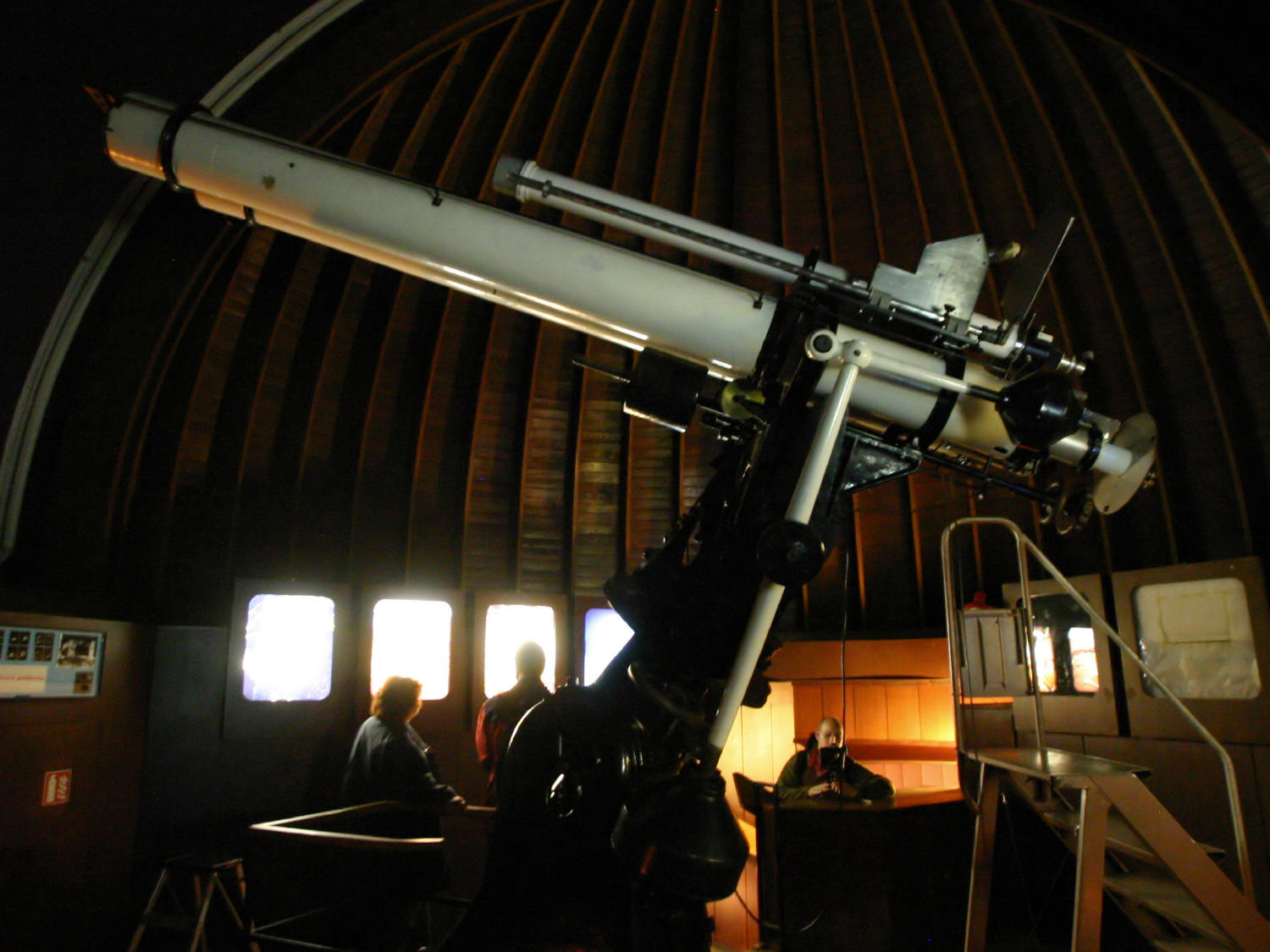
The observatory's main instrument: double refractor made by Zeiss in 1908

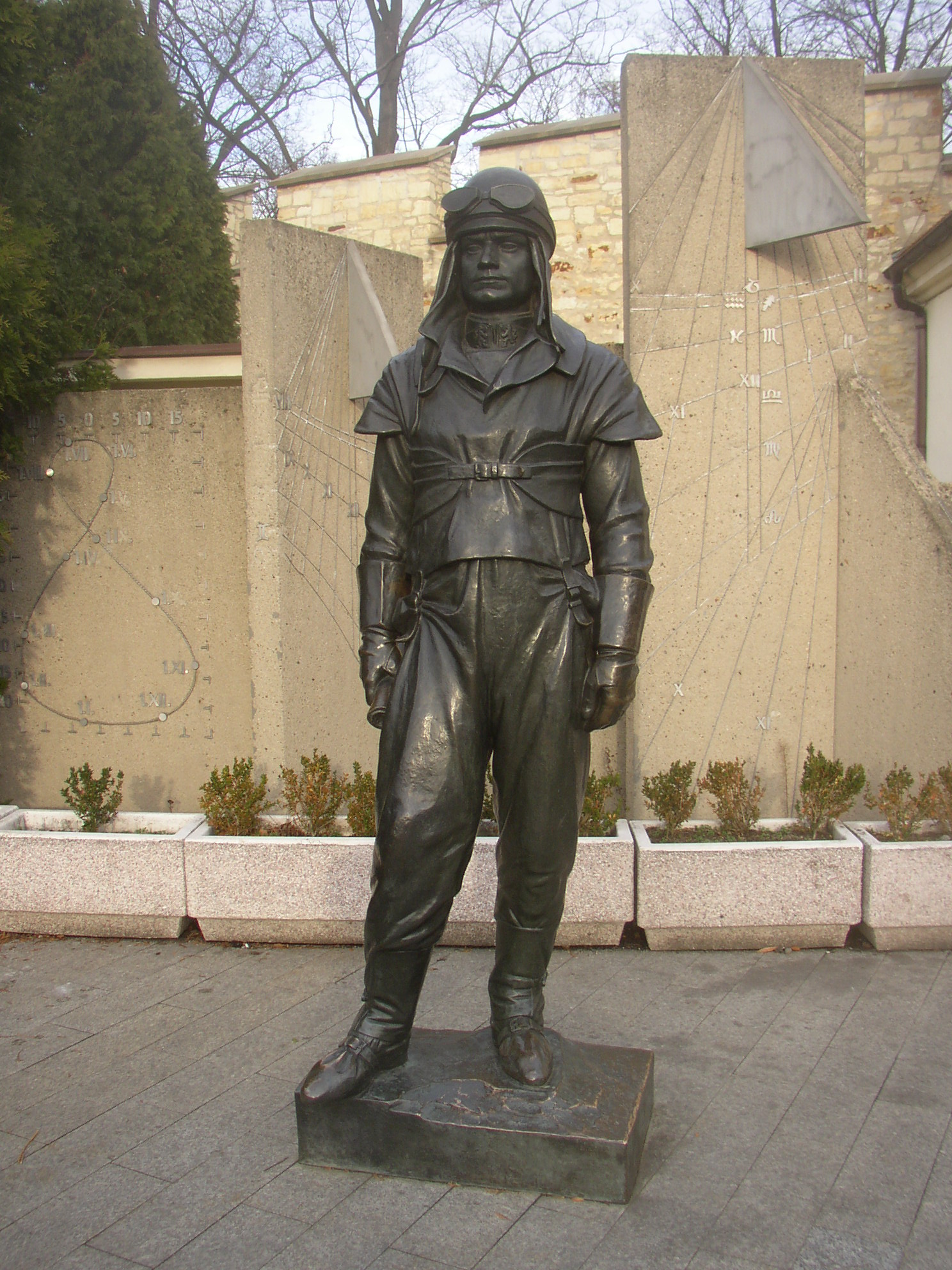
Statue of Milan Rastislav Štefánik in front of sundial

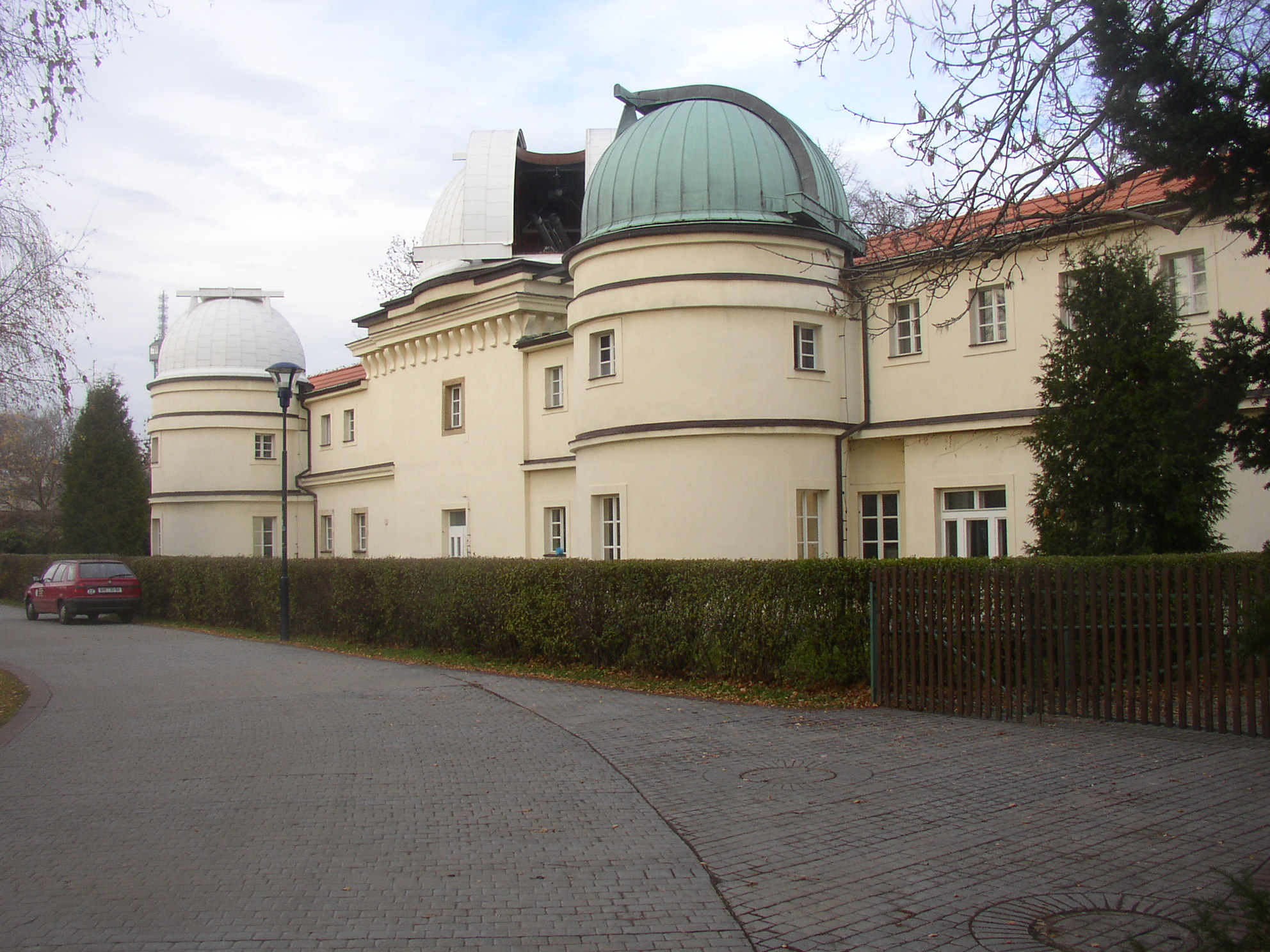
Štefánik's Observatory from the South

== See also ==
- List of astronomical observatories
- Statue of Milan Rastislav Štefánik, Prague
