= History of the Jews in Prague =

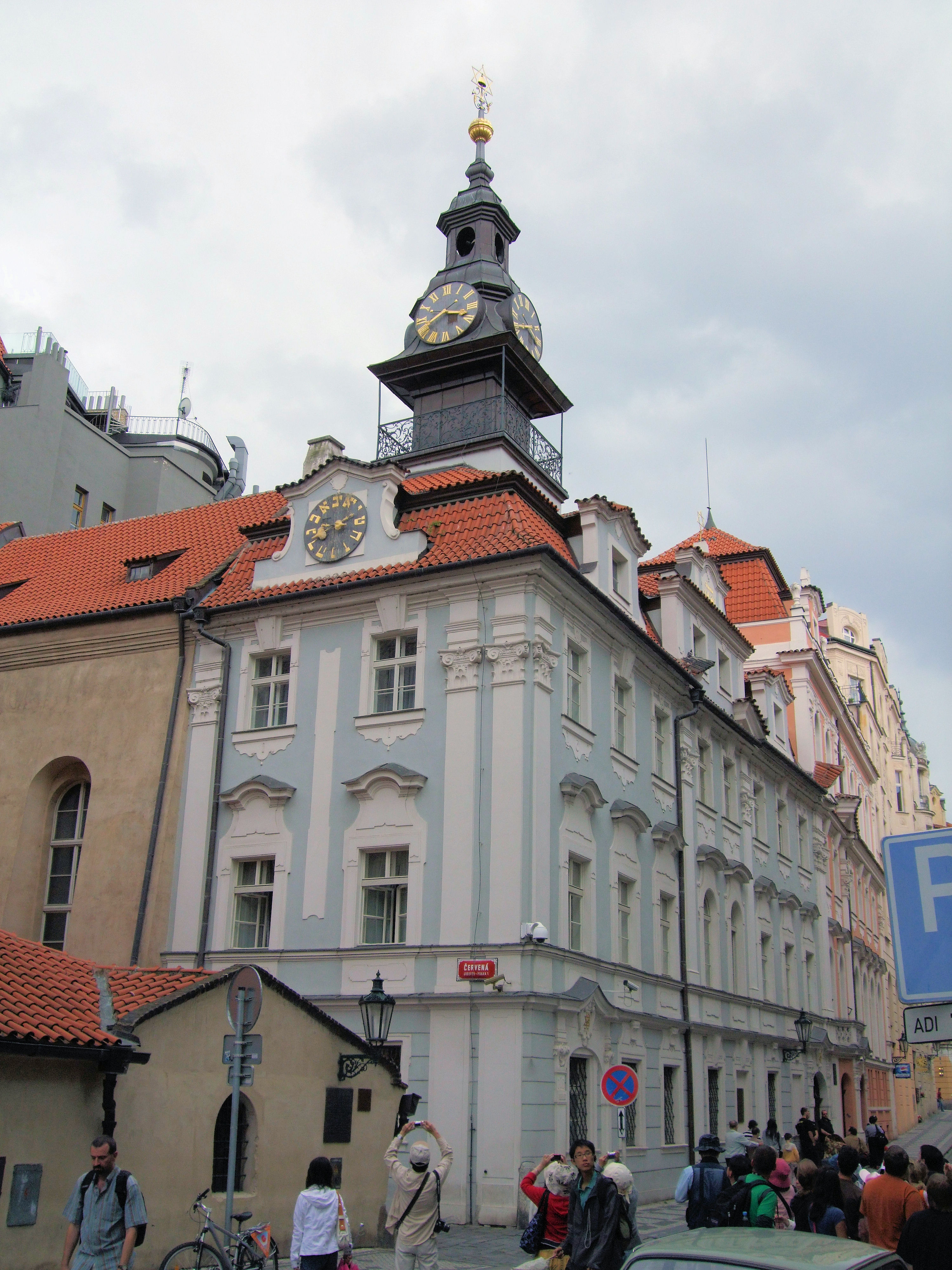
The Jewish Town Hall in Prague's Jewish Quarter.

The history of the Jews in Prague, the capital of today's Czech Republic, relates to one of Europe's oldest recorded and most well-known Jewish communities (in Hebrew, Kehilla), first mentioned by the Sephardi-Jewish traveller Ibrahim ibn Yaqub in 965 CE. Since then, the community has existed continuously, despite various pogroms and expulsions, the Holocaust, and subsequent antisemitic persecution by the Czech Communist regime in the 20th century.

Nowadays, the Jewish community of Prague numbers approximately 2,000–6,000 members. There are a number of synagogues of all Jewish denominations, including the orthodox Old New Synagogue, the oldest continuously active synagogue of the world; a Chabad centre, an old age home, a kindergarten, Lauder Schools, the Judaic Studies department at the Charles University, kosher restaurants and a kosher hotel. Notable Jews from Prague include Judah Loew ben Bezalel, Franz Kafka, Miloš Forman and Madeleine Albright.

== History ==
=== Early history ===
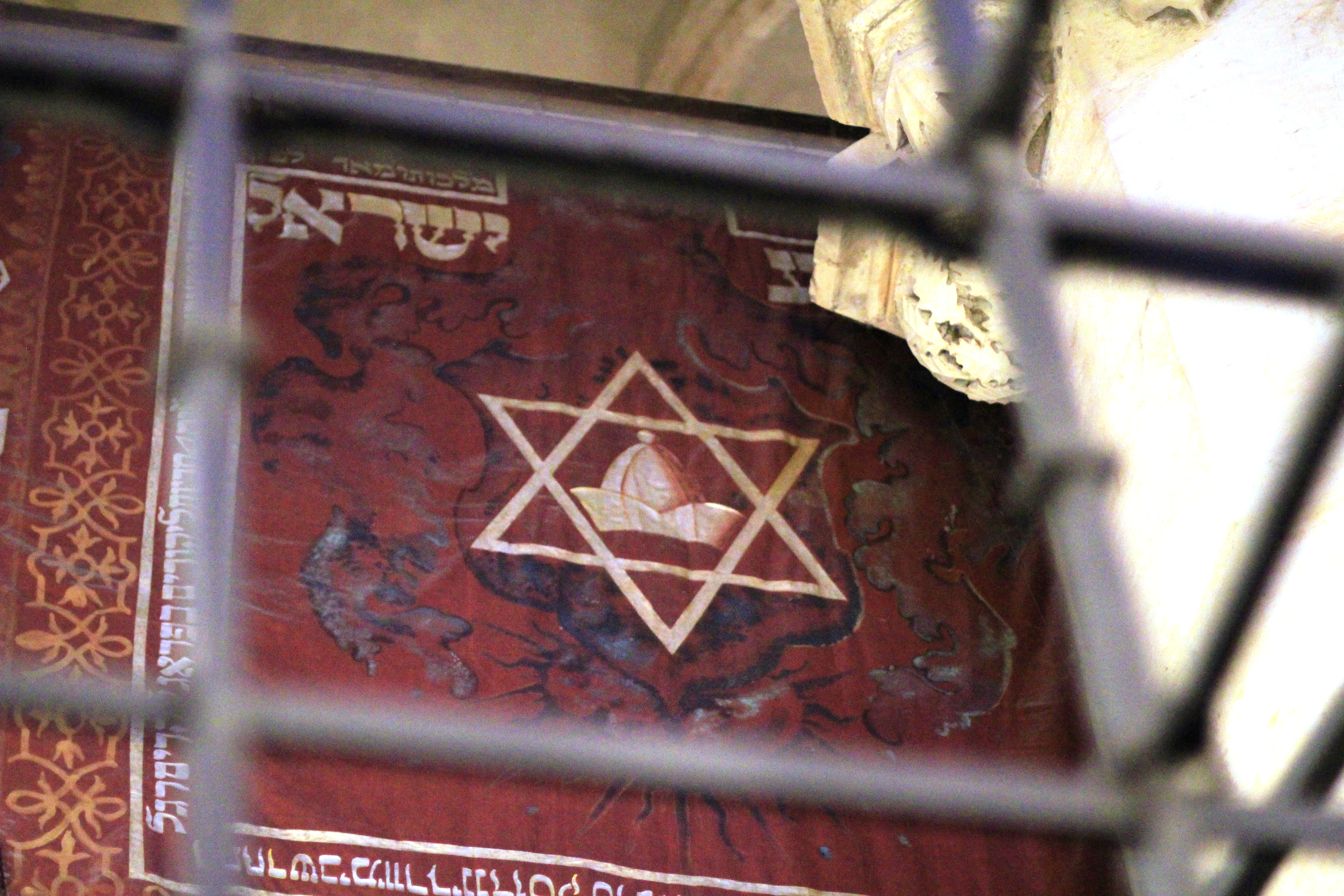
Historical flag of the Jewish community in Prague

The first reference to a Jewish community in Prague is in a report by Jewish traveler Ibrahim ibn Yaqub from 965 CE which mentions Jewish merchants at Prague markets. By the end of the 11th century, a Jewish community had been fully established in Prague. By the mid-12th century, following various attacks and pogroms such as the 1096 pogrom made by Volkmar, Prague's Jews were confined to living in an area on the right bank of the Vltava river which would eventually become the ghetto. Jews in Prague were first protected from persecution by a royal charter of Ottokar II of Bohemia in 1254, which stated that the Jews were protected as money lenders and servants of the king, but required to pay high taxes and occasionally supply loans to the royal treasury. At Easter in 1389, which coincided with Passover, Jews were accused of "desecration of the host" i.e. the sacramental bread, and, as a result, 3,000 Jewish men, women, and children were murdered in the streets, homes, and synagogues of the ghetto. In the aftermath of this pogrom, many Prague Jews fled to Poland and Hungary.

=== Prague's Jews during the Prague Renaissance ===
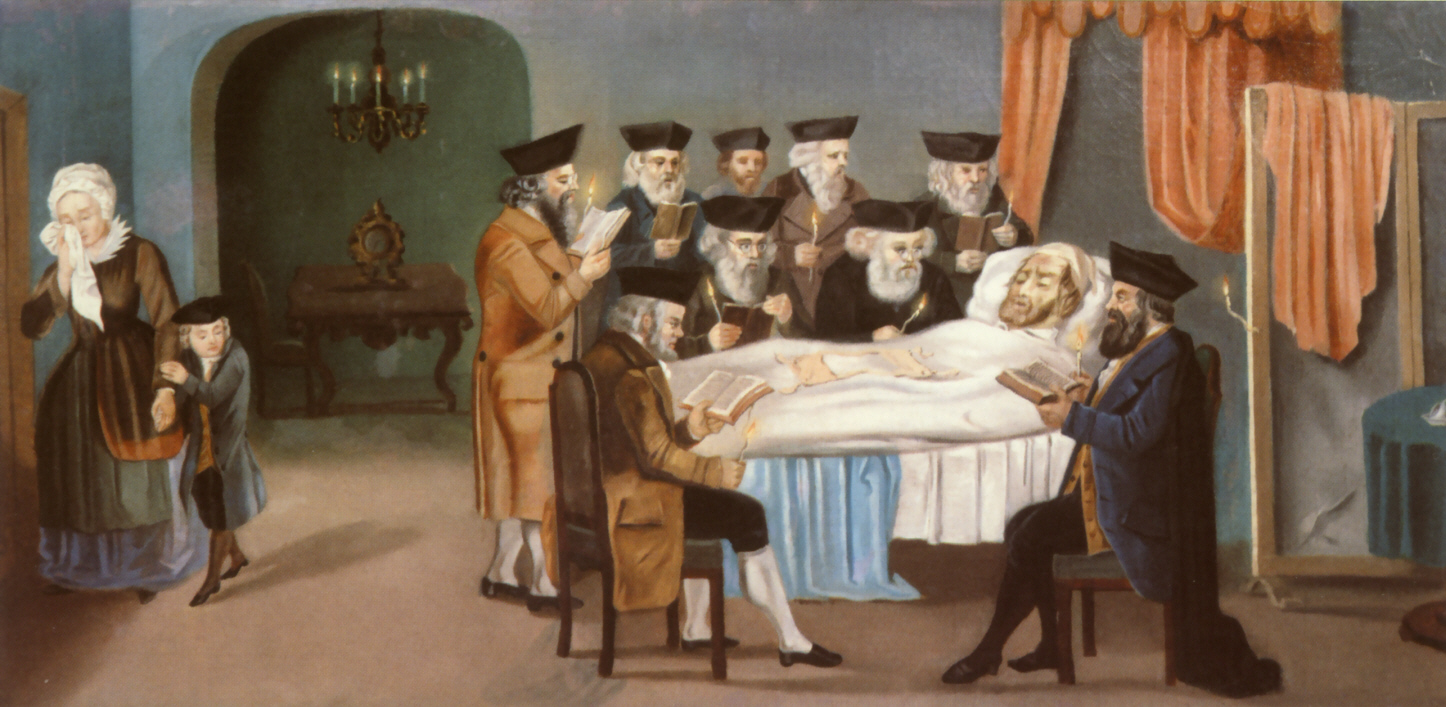
Members of the Prague Burial Society (chevra kadisha) pray at the bed of a dying man (around 1772).

In 1501, Bohemia’s landed nobility reaffirmed the ancient privileges of the Jews of Prague and this fostered an open atmosphere for economic activity. From 1522 to 1541, the Jewish population of Prague almost doubled; many Jewish refugees, who had been expelled from Moravia, Germany, Austria, and Spain, came to Prague. During the Habsburg reign, however, the Jewish people were expelled twice, in 1542 and 1561, the community strengthening on each return. From 1564 to 1612, the reigns of Maximilian II and Rudolf II were a 'golden age' for the Jews in Prague. By the early 1700s, the Jews accounted for about a quarter of Prague's population with more Jewish people living in Prague than anywhere else in the world. This 'golden age' ended with Empress Maria Theresa's succession to the throne, and Jews were expelled from Prague once again from 1745 to 1748. In 1782, Emperor Joseph II issued the Edict of Tolerance, which affirmed the notion of religious tolerance in the Hapsburg Empire, including for Jews. The Edict allowed Prague's Jews to participate in all forms of trade, commerce, agriculture and the arts.

=== The Holocaust ===
In 1939, at the outbreak of World War II, over 92,000 Jews lived in Prague, representing almost 20 per cent of the city’s population. At least two-thirds of the city's Jewish population perished in the Holocaust.

=== Post-World War II ===
In 1946, Prague had a Jewish population of 10,338, of whom: 1,396 had not been deported (being mostly of mixed Jewish and Christian parentage); 227 had gone into hiding during the Nazi occupation; 4,986 had returned from prisons, concentration camps or the Theresienstadt Ghetto; 883 had returned from Czechoslovak army units abroad; 613 were Czechoslovak Jewish emigres who had returned; and 2,233 were Jews from Carpathian Ruthenia, who had decided to move to Czechoslovakia after that territory had been ceded to the Soviet Union in June 1945.

Following the Communist takeover in 1945, Jewish life was stifled and most of Prague's Jews kept their identity a secret. By 1949, when Jewish emigration to Israel was forbidden, around 2,500 of Prague's Jews had emigrated to Israel. The situation worsened following the failure of the Prague Spring and the resulting Soviet invasion of Czechoslovakia in 1968, following which 3,400 Jews fled the country.

In 2022, the Federation of Jewish Communities estimated that there are between 3,000 and 5,000 Jews in the Czech Republic, of which 1,600 live in Prague.

== Jewish Quarter and Ghetto ==
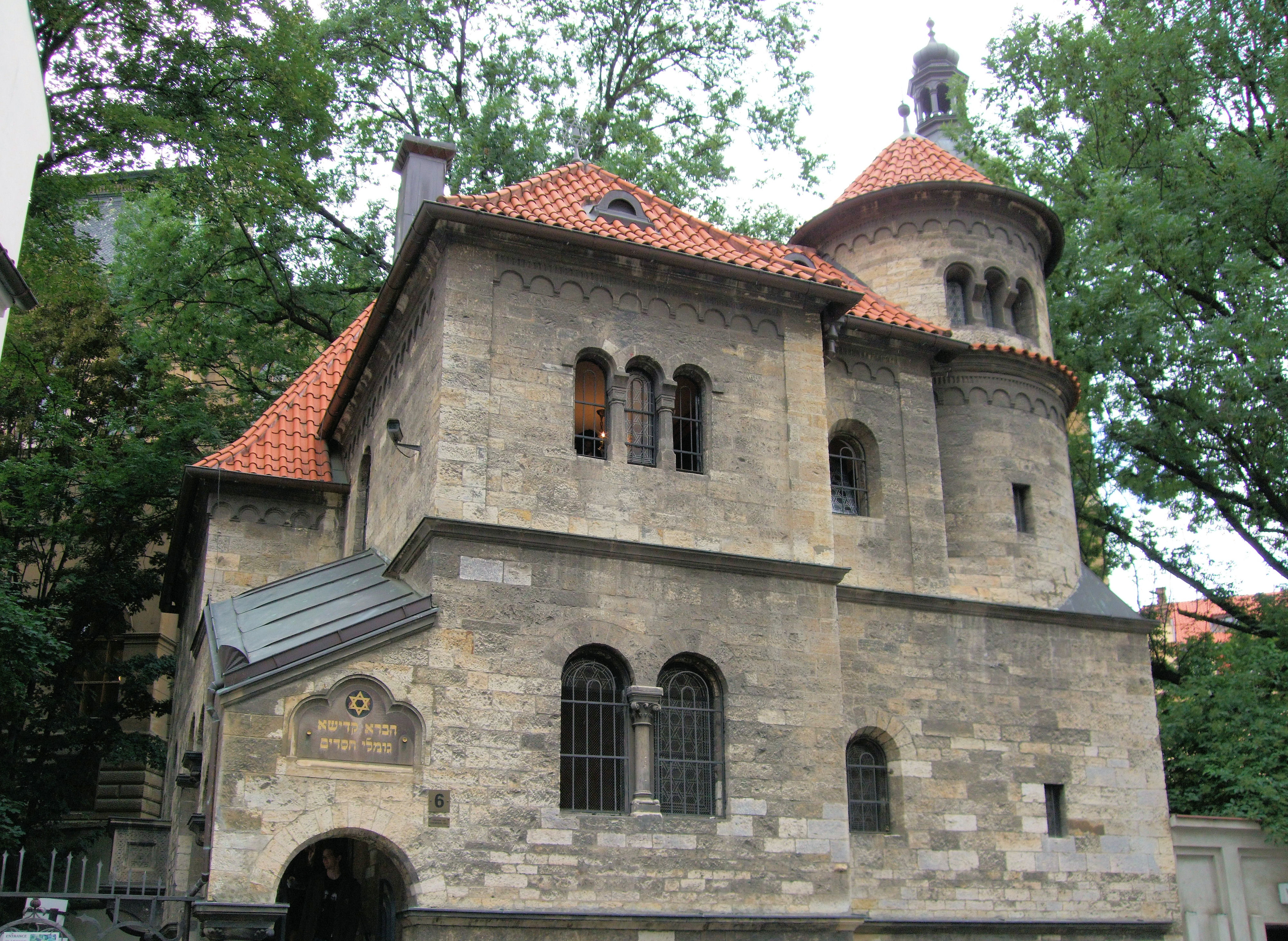
Jewish Ceremonial Hall (Obřadní síň) in U starého hřbitova Street, Prague

Known as Židovské město in Czech (and later Judenstadt in German), the ghetto was the center of Jewish mysticism. From 1522 to 1541, the population of the ghetto almost doubled due to an influx of Jews expelled from Moravia, German lands (of the Holy Roman Empire), Austria and Spain. The ghetto grew in area because laws were introduced allowing the Jews to build homes on land next to the ghetto. Inside the ghetto, the Jewish residents had their own town hall with a prized small bell used to call attendees to meetings. The Jews also had permission to fly their own flag. Jews living in the ghetto prospered in many diverse professions such as mathematicians, astronomers, geographers, historians, philosophers, and artists.

Except for the synagogues and a few other buildings, the Jewish Quarter was totally demolished in the early 1900s and rebuilt in the then-popular Art Nouveau style.

=== Old Jewish Cemetery ===
One of the oldest Jewish cemeteries in Europe, the Old Jewish Cemetery was in operation from at least 1439 and was closed in 1787. The Cemetery is located in the Jewish Quarter on a small plot of land between the Pinkas Synagogue and the Klausen Synagogue. During the four hundred plus years that the Cemetery was active, about 200,000 Jewish people from the ghetto were buried there. Because the Cemetery was only capable of holding around ten per cent of the number of Jews buried there, the graves span about twelve tombs deep. The most famous tomb is that of the sixteenth century rabbi Judah Loew ben Bezalel. The oldest grave in the Cemetery, from 1439, belongs to Rabbi Avigdor Kara.

Whereas many other Jewish cemeteries situated in territory controlled by the Nazis were plundered or left to ruin, the Nazi occupying administration saw that Prague's Old Jewish Cemetery was preserved. This was possibly for the Cemetery to form part of a planned future Jewish museum after the completion of the Final Solution, but the precise plans or aims are unclear or unknown.

== Synagogues ==
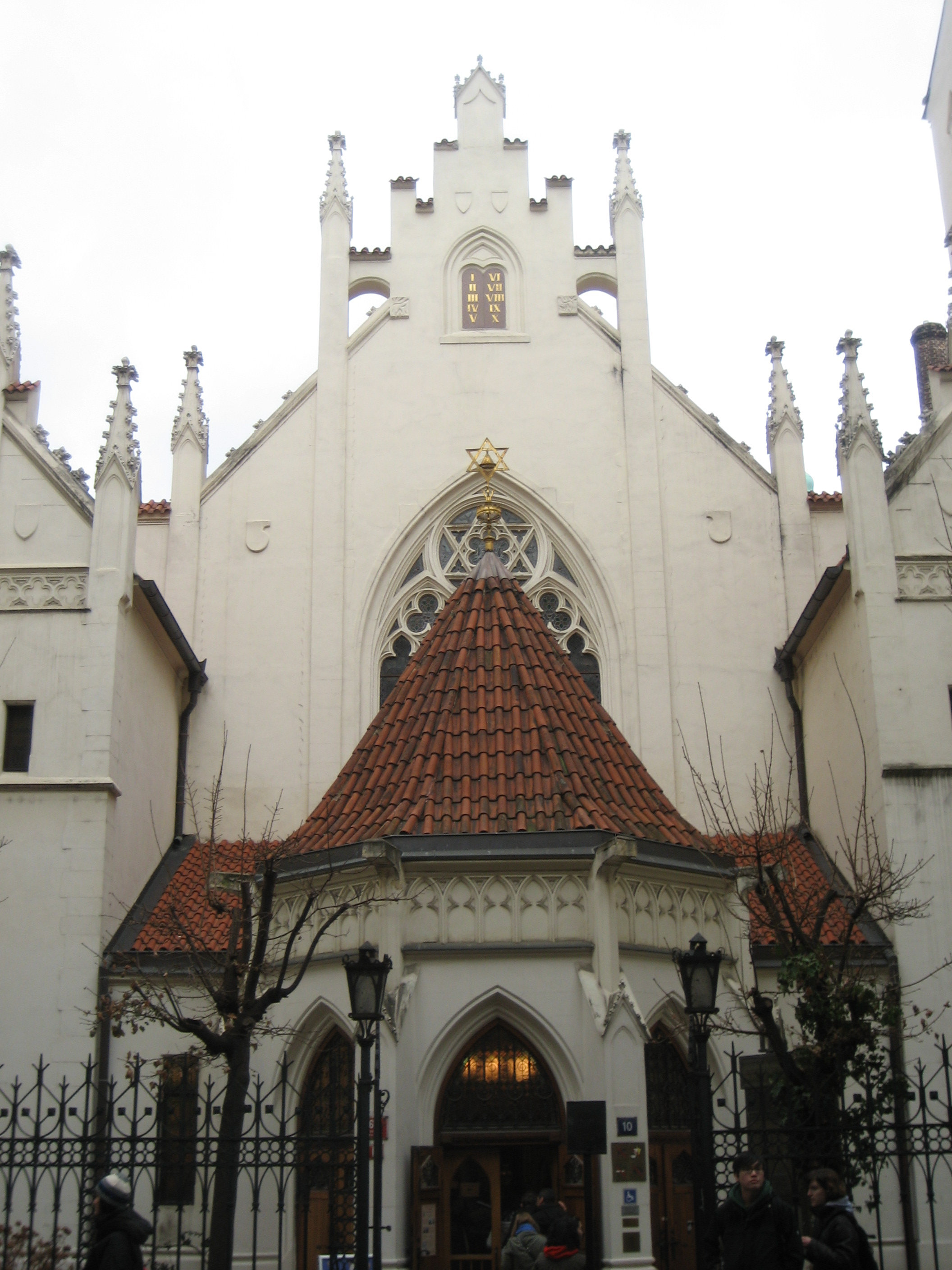
The Maisel Synagogue in Prague's Jewish Quarter.

The oldest Jewish house of worship in Prague, the Old School Synagogue is no longer standing. It was replaced by the 'Great' or 'New School' in 1270. As the Jewish community grew and more synagogues were built, this medieval gothic building became known as the Old New Synagogue (or Altneuschul).

During the Jewish Renaissance in Prague, beginning in the sixteenth century, four major synagogues were built and completed. The Pinkas Synagogue was completed in 1479 and showcases Renaissance design in its architecture. The author Franz Kafka attended services at the Pinkas Synagogue in the twentieth century.

Completed in 1568, the High Synagogue (so dubbed because the worship space is on the second floor) stood and still stands next to the Jewish Town Hall and served the seniors of the Jewish Quarter. In 1591, Rudolph II allowed the building of the Maisel Synagogue, named for its benefactor Mordecai Maisel. The Synagogue suffered multiple fires. The Klausen Synagogue, located on land also donated by Maisel and built in the Baroque style, opened in 1694.

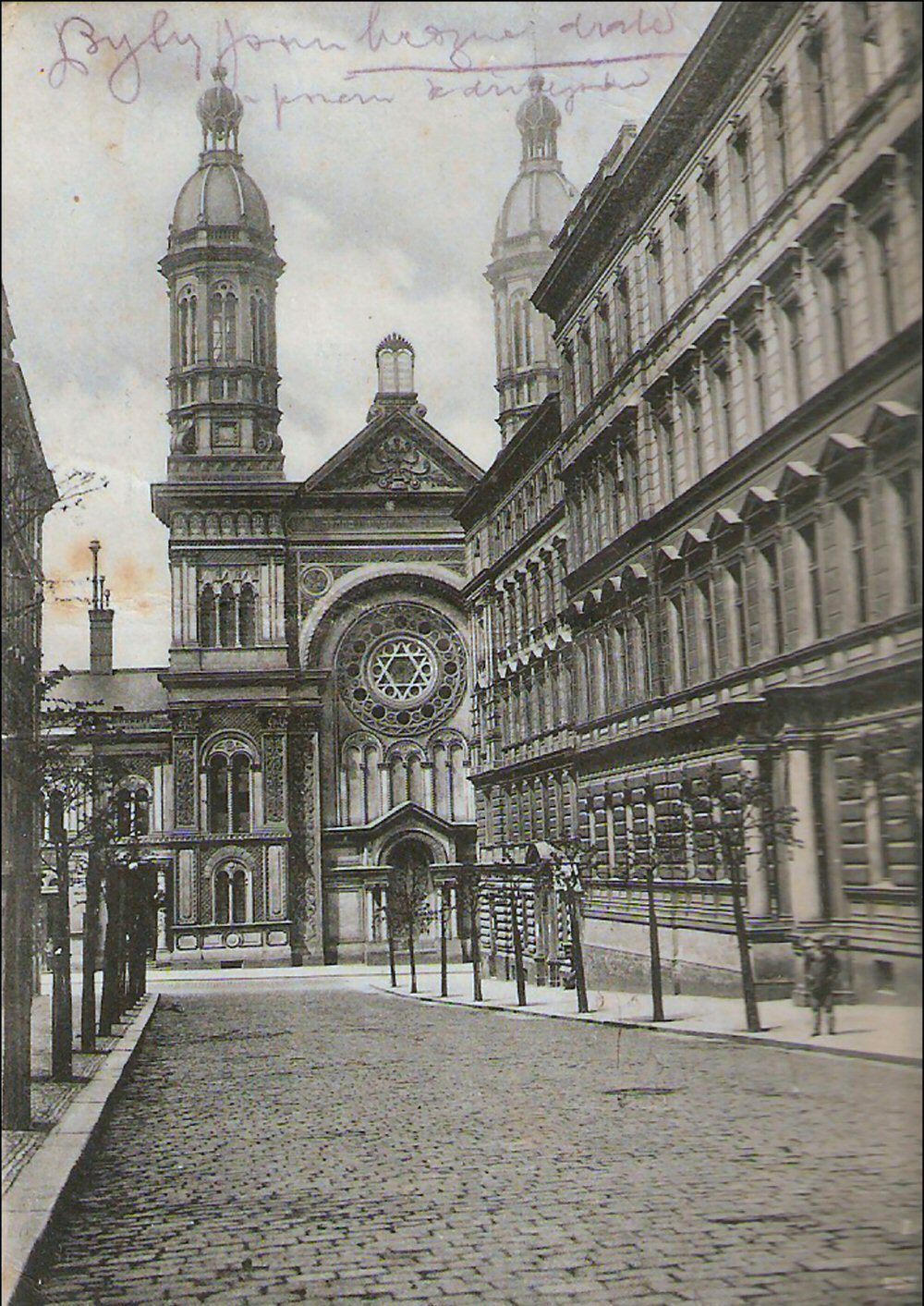
Vinohrady Synagogue, destroyed 1951 through 1945 war damage

During the 1945 bombing of Prague in World War II, the Vinohrady Synagogue (opened 1896), the largest Jewish house of prayer in the city, was destroyed.

Two more landmark synagogues still stand in Prague: the Spanish Synagogue, built in 1868 on the site of the Old School Synagogue, and the Jerusalem Synagogue, dedicated in 1906. The former was built in the Moorish style, while the design of the latter combines Moorish elements with Art Nouveau.

More synagogues were built in the suburbs of Prague: in Michle (opened in around 1730), Uhřiněves (1848), Košíře (1849), Libeň (1858), Karlín (1861), Smíchov (consecrated 1863, reconstructed 1931) and Bubny (1899). These synagogues are no longer active.

== Flags of the Jews of Prague ==
Charles IV gave the Jews of Prague the honour of a flag in 1357. There is no evidence of what was on it. Ferdinand II gave Mordechai Meysl the right to fly the 'flag of King David' in 1598, and it is likely that it contained a hexagram Star of David enclosing a Jewish hat, although only the 1716 replacement flag survives.

In 1648, Ferdinand III gave the Jewish community a flag for their assistance in fighting Swedish attackers during the Thirty Years' War.

== See also ==
- 2006 Prague terror plot
- Jewish Museum in Prague
- Knaanic language (Judaeo-Czech)
- Altschuler, Jewish surname originating in Prague
