= Old Jewish Cemetery, Prague =

Cemetery with burials from the 1400s to 1786

Old Jewish Cemetery
- Starý židovský hřbitov
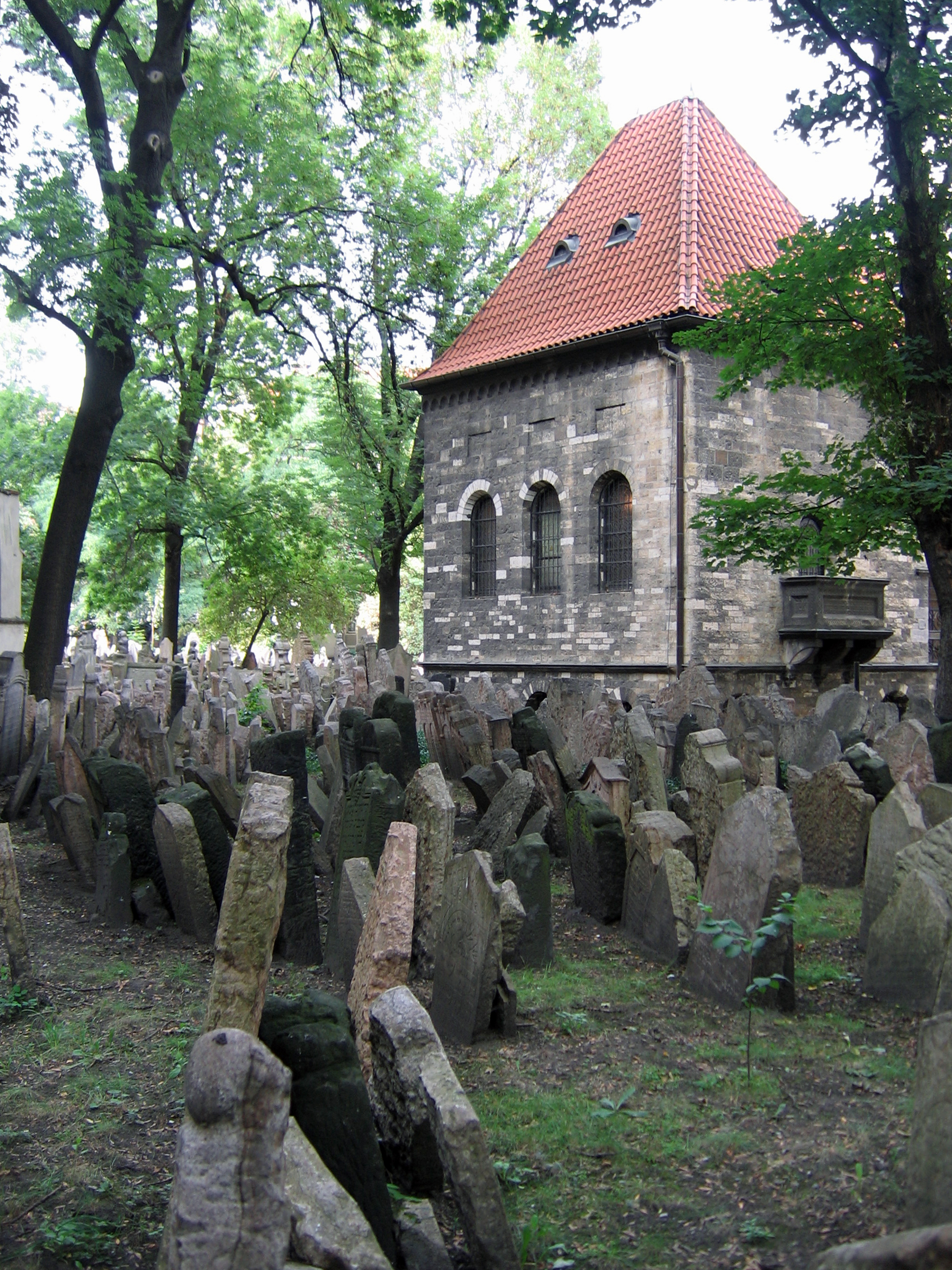
- Thousands of gravestones are crammed into the Old Jewish Cemetery in Prague.
- Interactive map of Old Jewish Cemetery

Details
- Established: first half of the 15th century
- Location: Prague 1
- Country: Czech Republic
- Coordinates: 50°05′23″N 14°25′02″E
- Type: Judaic
- Owned by: The Jewish Community in Prague
- Website: https://www.jewishmuseum.cz/en/explore/sites/old-jewish-cemetery/

The Old Jewish Cemetery (Czech: Starý židovský hřbitov) is a Jewish cemetery in Prague, Czech Republic, which is one of the largest of its kind in Europe and one of the most important Jewish historical monuments in Prague. It served its purpose from the first half of the 15th century until 1786. Renowned personalities of the local Jewish community were buried here; among them rabbi Jehuda Liva ben Becalel – Maharal (ca. 1526–1609), businessman Mordecai Meisel (1528–1601), historian David Gans (ca. 1541–1613) and rabbi David Oppenheim (1664–1736). Today the cemetery is administered by the Jewish Museum in Prague.

== History ==
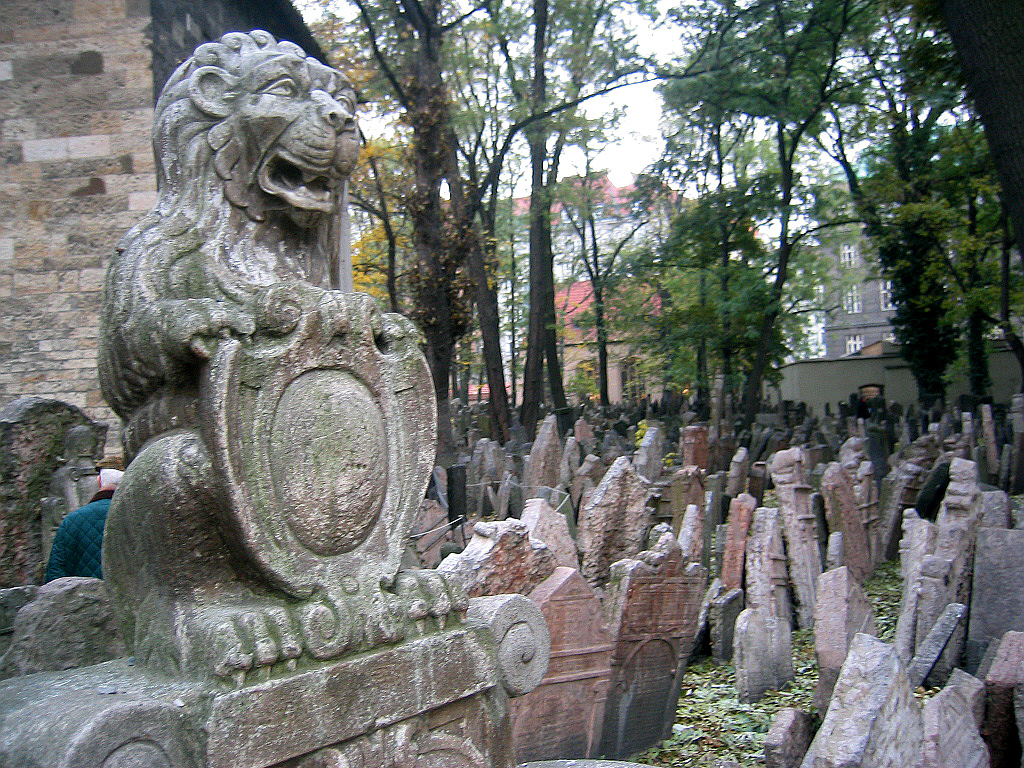
Lion – herald on gravestone of Hendl Bassevi.

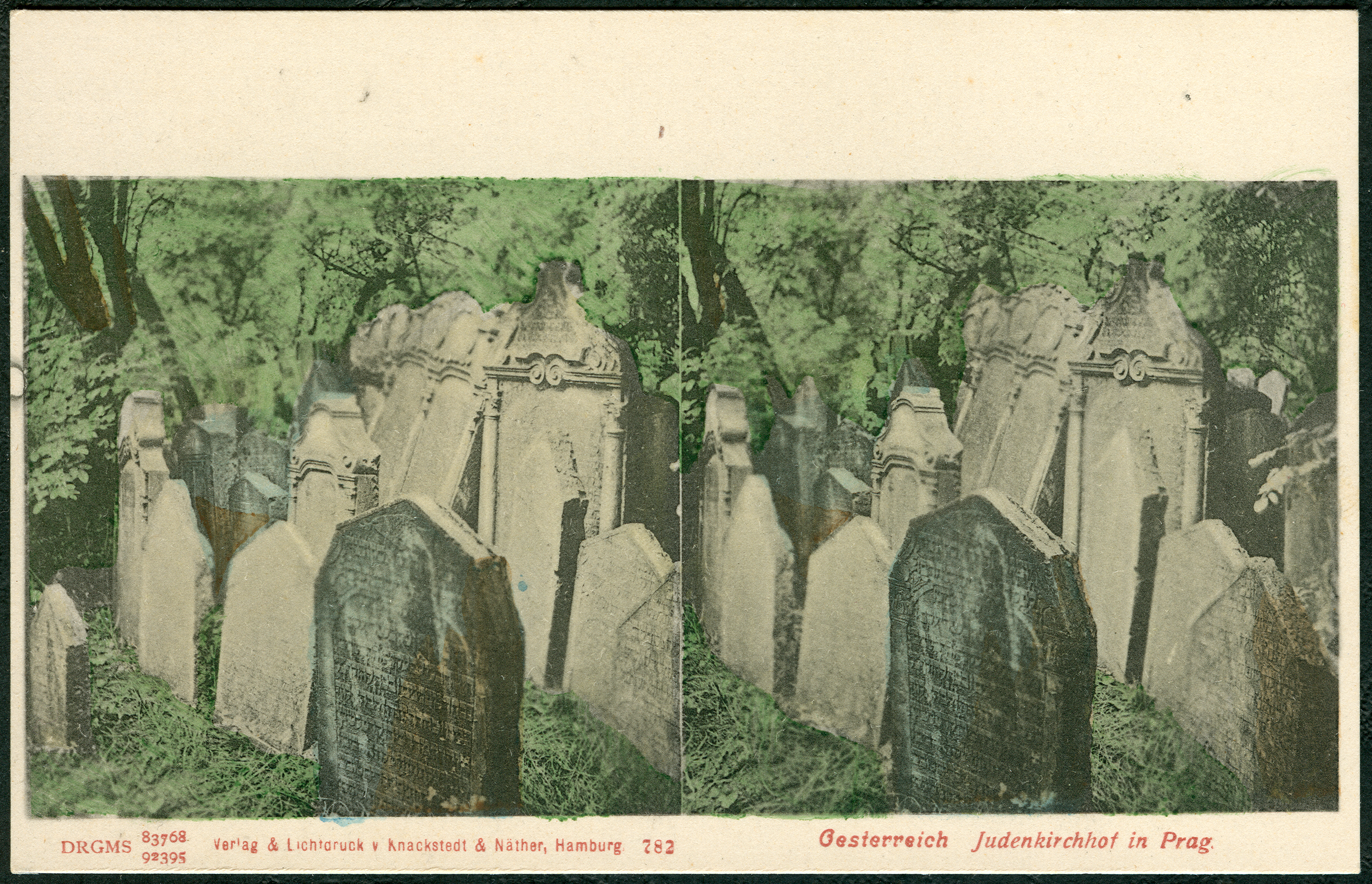
Some gravestones about 1900; Stereoscopy as colored postcard No. 782 by Knackstedt & Näther, Hamburg

=== Predecessor ===
The Old Jewish Cemetery is not the first Jewish cemetery in Prague – its predecessor was so-called "Jewish Garden“ located in the area of present New Town of Prague. This cemetery was closed by order of King Vladislaus II in 1478 because of complaints of Prague citizens. Later it disappeared under the streets of New Town.

=== Evolution ===
The exact date of the Old Cemetery’s founding is unknown. The only clue is the oldest gravestone in the cemetery from 1439 which belongs to rabbi and poet Avigdor Kara.

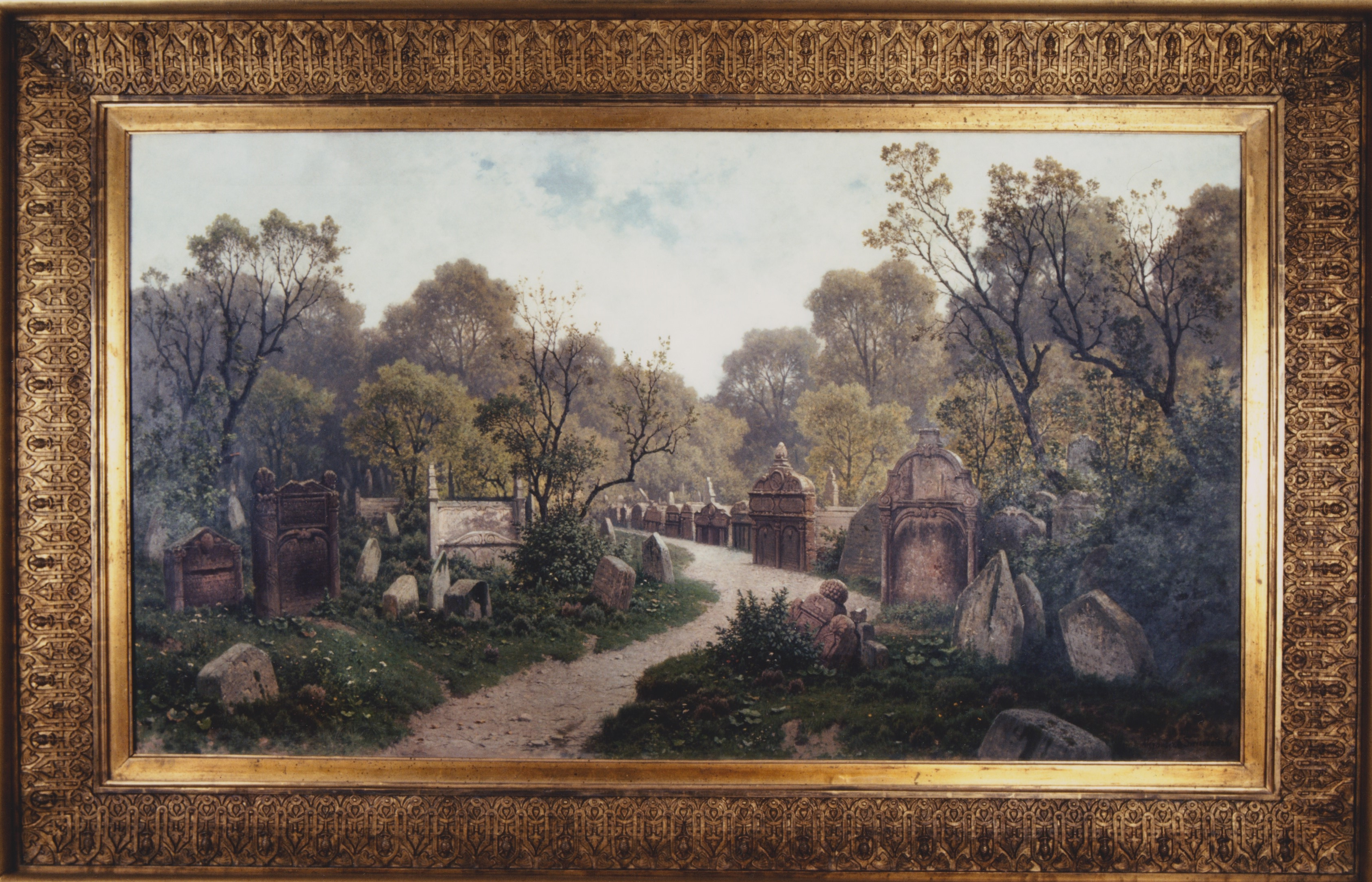
The Old Jewish Cemetery Prague, by Alexander von Swiezewski, end of the 19th century. In the collection of the Jewish Museum of Switzerland.

Starting at the middle of the 15th century, the gravestones record is a continual time line of burials. The final gravestone is dated 1787; three years earlier, the enlightened sovereign Emperor Josef II had banned burials inside the city walls for hygienic reasons. Later Prague Jews used a cemetery in Žižkov, founded in the 17th century because of plague epidemic.

=== Space and burial in layers ===
During the more than three centuries in which it was in active use, the cemetery continually struggled with the lack of space. Piety and respect for the deceased ancestors does not allow the Jews to abolish old graves. Only occasionally the Jewish community was allowed to purchase grounds to expand the cemetery and so many times it had to gain space in other ways; if necessary, a new layer of soil was heaped up on the available area. For this reason, there are places where as many as twelve layers now exist. Thanks to this solution the older graves themselves remained intact. However, as new levels were added it was necessary either to lay over the gravestones associated with the older (and lower) graves to protect them, or else to elevate the stones to the new, higher surface. This explains the dense forest of gravestones that one sees today; many of them commemorate an individual who is buried several layers further down. This also explains why the surface of the cemetery is raised several meters higher than the surrounding streets; retaining walls are necessary to hold the soil and the graves in place.

== Gravestones ==
There are two kinds of Jewish burial monuments (in Hebrew matzevot) – the older is a slab of wood or stone, basically rectangular, but with various endings at the top. Tumba (in Hebrew ohel – tent) appears later, in baroque times. It is generally more representative than the first mentioned kind and resembles a little house. Such tumbas commemorate on the cemetery for example Maharal or Mordecai Maisel. Tumbas do not contain the remains; they are buried underneath in ground.

The oldest gravestones on Old Jewish cemetery are plain, yet very soon the number of ornaments (pilasters, volutes, false portals, etc.) began to increase. Most decorated gravestones are 17th century. However, on every gravestone there are Hebrew letters that inform about the name of the deceased person and the date of his or her death or burial. Copious praise of deceased' virtues appears beside brief eulogy ("of blessed memory") in Renaissance time. From the 16th century the gravestones characterize the deceased also through various symbols, hinting at the life, character, name or profession of the people (see the tables below for details).

| Religious Characteristics | | Personal Qualities | |
|---|---|---|---|
| Crown | A good reputation | | |
| A pair of blessing hands | Cohen, a descendant of temple priests | Wine grapes | Fertility, a good, prosperous life |
| A jug and a bowl | Levite, a descendant of temple helpers of Cohens | | |

| Name or By-name | | | | Profession | |
| Male | | Female | | Profession | |
|---|---|---|---|---|---|
| Lion | Arye, Leib or Yehudah (see Gn 49,9) | Bird | Tzipora, Feigele or Taubele | Book | Cantor |
| Deer | Naftali (Gn 49, 29). Tzvi or Hirsch | Rose | Rosa | Harp or Violin | Musician |
| Bear | Yissachar, Dov or Beer | By-name | | Lancet | Physician |
| Wolf | Zeev or Benjamin (Gn 49,27) | Mouse | Maisel | Scissors | Tailor |
| Hexagram | David or Menahem | Goose | Gans | Calf | Butcher |

== Notable people ==
This list follows the numbering of the plan on the right.

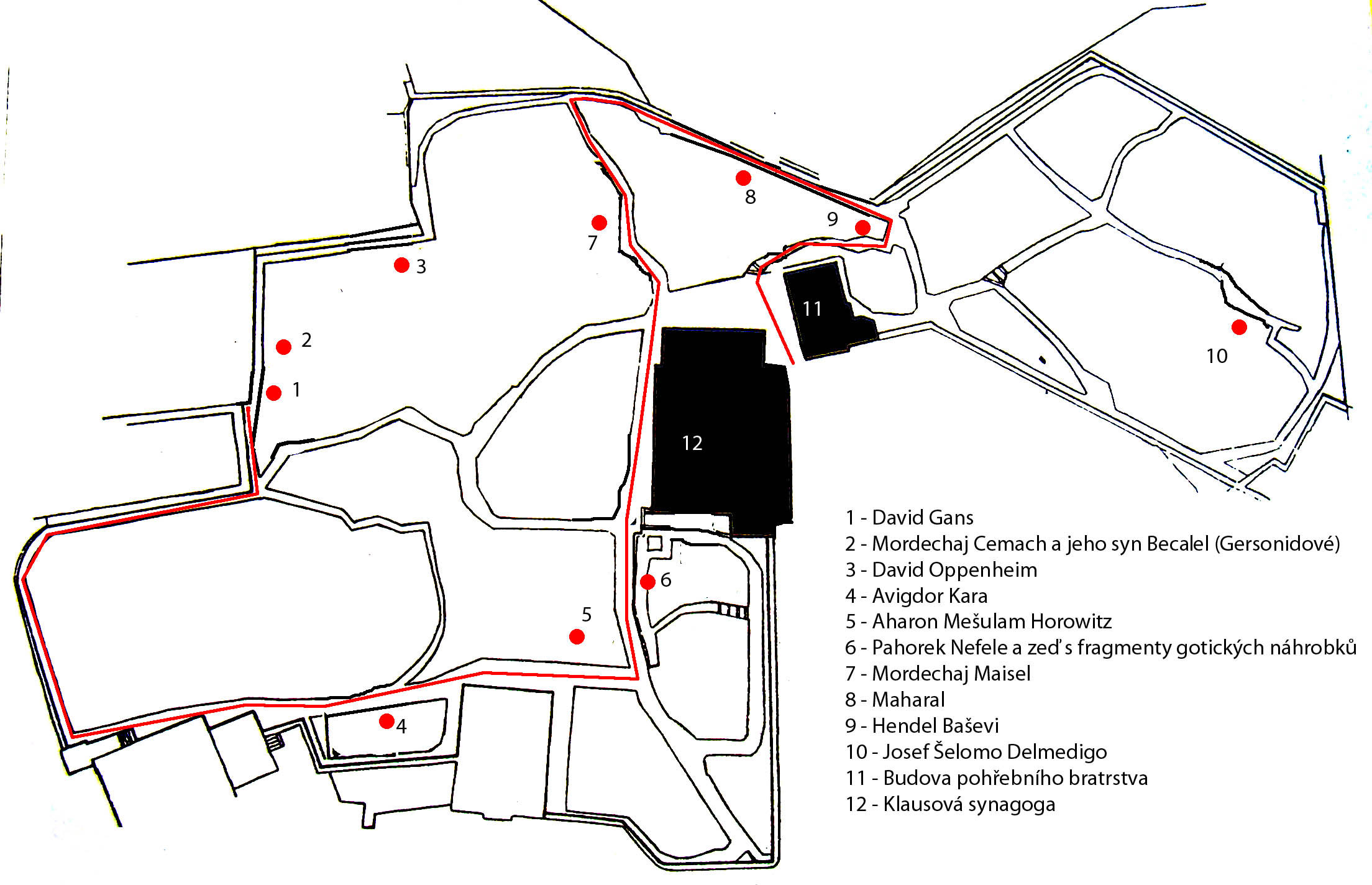
Orientation plan of the Old Jewish Cemetery of Prague

1. A small gravestone with triangular ending and engraved symbols of Magen David and a goose (gans means goose in German) belongs to David Gans (1541–1613), a contemporary of Maharal and other significant Jewish figures of the 16th century, a mathematician, astronomer, geographer and historian, whose chronicle Cemah David includes also Czech history.
2. A gravestone of Gersonides – Mordecai Katz ben Gershom (died 1592) and his son Betzalel (d. 1589) – marks the place of eternal rest of important Prague Jewish printers. One of their works, Prague hagadah, was known throughout Europe.
3. A tumba with a hexagram on the top of the front wall, which refers to name David, belongs to rabbi David Oppenheim (1664–1736). His book collection constitutes an important part of the Hebrew section of Bodleian Library in Oxford.
4. A plain rectangular gravestone of rabbi and poet Avigdor Kara (died 1439) is the oldest on the cemetery. His elegy which describes a great pogrom of the Prague Ghetto in 1389 is still recited on Yom Kippur in Old-New Synagogue.
5. A high rectangular gravestone commemorates Aharon Meshulam Horowitz (d. ca. 1545), the richest Jew of his time, who initiated building Pinkas Synagogue.
6. On the hill Nephele (nephele is a miscarriage in Hebrew) were buried children who died before the age of one month. Remains and gravestones found during construction of modern Prague were transferred to this place, too.
7. The oldest tumba on the cemetery belongs to a businessman, benefactor and renowned public person of the ghetto Mordecai Maisel (1528–1601). He built a synagogue in the Jewish quarter which is named after him.
8. Rabbi Judah Löw ben Betzalel (1512–1609) and his wife rest under another tumba, decorated with symbols of a lion and wine grapes. Rabbi Judah, also called Maharal, wrote numerous religious and philosophical treatises. His name is also connected with legends; a legend about Golem is the most famous.
9. A tumba belonging to Hendl Bassevi (died 1628) is probably the most representative on the cemetery. The lions seated on the gables of the tumba do not symbolize the name Judah; they carry the coat of arms of Hendl's husband Jacob Bassevi. He was the first Jew in Habsburg Empire to receive a title of nobility. A grave of this successful businessman cannot, however, be found on Prague Cemetery, because he died and was buried in Mladá Boleslav.
10. The last tumba to be mentioned covers the grave of Joseph Solomon Delmedigo (1591–1655), a physician and a remarkable scholar born in Crete, who worked in many scientific fields and lived in many places in Europe, Asia and Africa.

== In the popular culture ==
Hermann Goedsche in his 1868 novel Biarritz (To Sedan) contains a chapter called "The Jewish Cemetery in Prague and the Council of Representatives of the Twelve Tribes of Israel." In it, Goedsche (who was unaware that only two of the original twelve Biblical "tribes" remained) depicts a clandestine nocturnal meeting of members of a mysterious rabbinical cabal that is planning a diabolical "Jewish conspiracy." At midnight, the Devil appears to contribute his opinions and insight. The chapter closely resembles a scene in Alexandre Dumas' Giuseppe Balsamo (1848), in which Joseph Balsamo a.k.a. Alessandro Cagliostro and company plot the Affair of the Diamond Necklace.

The cemetery is mentioned in Umberto Eco's The Prague Cemetery, the novel which was named after it.
