= Mordecai Meisel =

Czech Jewish businessman (1528–1601)

Mordecai Marcus Meisel (Czech: Miška Marek Majzel; 1528, Prague – 13 March 1601, Prague) was a philanthropist and communal leader of the Jewish community in Prague. He was one of the first court Jews of Eastern Europe.

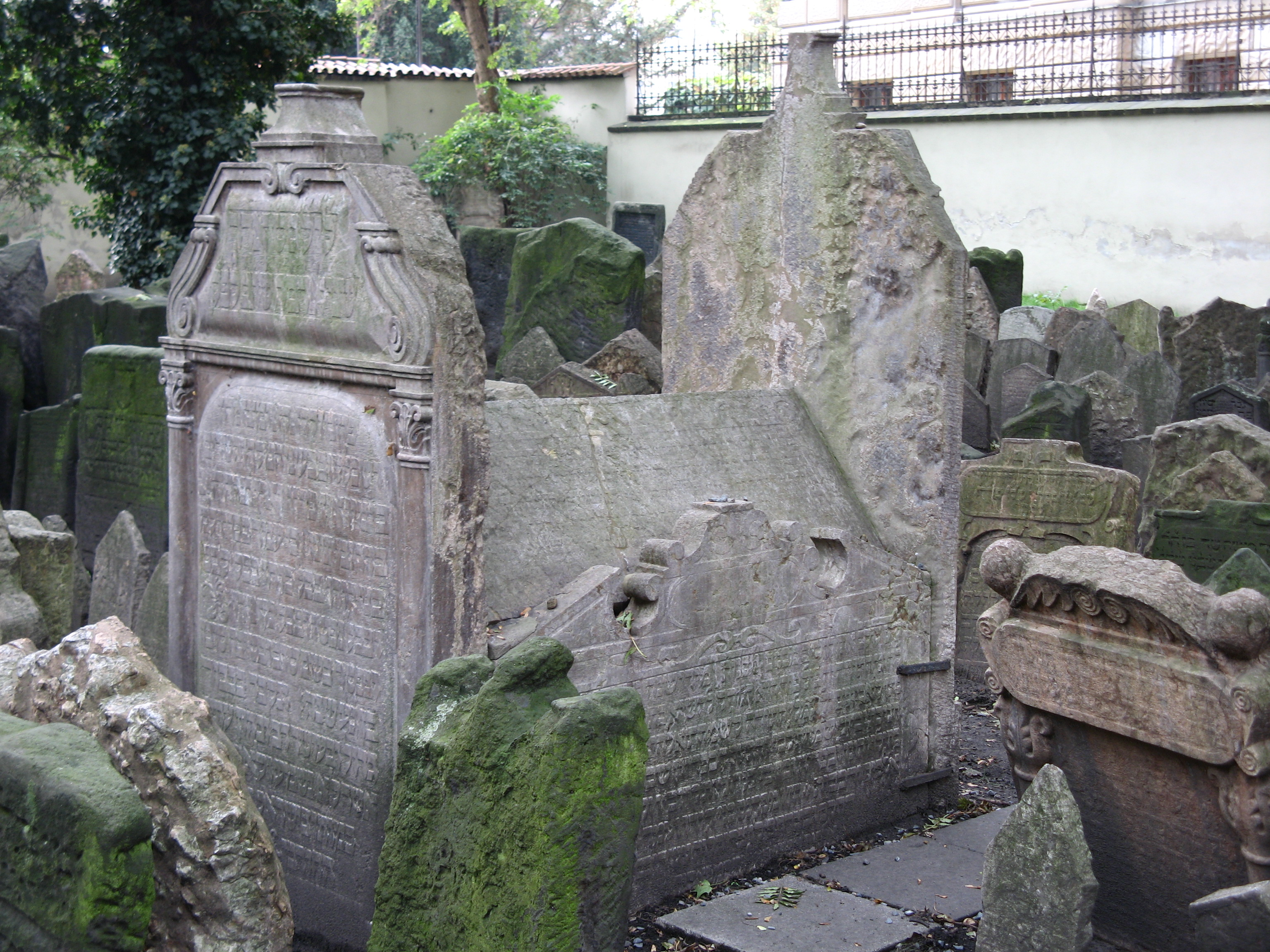
Grave of Mordechai Meisel at the Old Jewish Cemetery, Prague (1601)

== Biography ==
Born to the Meisel family. In 1542 and 1561 his family, with the other Jewish inhabitants, was forced to leave the city, though only for a time. The source of the great wealth which subsequently enabled him to become the benefactor of his coreligionists and to aid the Austrian imperial house, especially during the Turkish wars, is unknown.

He is mentioned in documents for the first time in 1569, as having business relations with the communal director Isaac Rofe, a.k.a. Lékař (meaning medical doctor in both Hebrew and Czech), subsequently his father-in-law. His first wife, Eva, who died before 1580, built with him the Jewish Town Hall in Prague, which is still standing and serves today as the headquarters of the Czech Jewish Community, as well as the neighboring High Synagogue, where the Jewish court sat. With his second wife, Frummet, he built (1590–92) the Maisel Synagogue, which was much admired by the Jews of the time, being, next to the Altneusynagoge, the metropolitan synagogue of the city; it still bears his name. The costly golden and silver vessels with which he and his wife furnished this building either were lost during the lawsuit over his estate or were burned during the conflagrations in the ghetto on 21 June 1689 and 16 May 1754. The only gifts dedicated by Meisel and his wife to this synagogue that have been preserved are a curtain (paroket) embroidered with hundreds of pearls, a similarly adorned wrapper for the scroll of the Law, and a magnificent bronze ornament for the almemar. Jacob Segre, rabbi of Casale Monferrato, celebrated the dedication of the synagogue in a poem which is still extant, and his contemporary David Gans, the chronicler of Prague, has described in his Tzemach Dawid the enthusiasm with which the Jewish population received the gift.

Meisel went on to build quarters and provide housing for Jews who migrated from what is now modern-day Belarus.

== See also ==
- History of the Jews in Prague
