= Taube Pan =

Yiddish writer

Taube bas Leib Pan (née Pitzker; Yiddish: טויבאַ בּת לייבּ פּאַן) was a sixteenth-century Yiddish writer, who lived in the Prague ghetto at the time of Mordecai Meisel.

Pan was the daughter of Rabbi Moshe Leib Pitzker, and wife of Yakov Pan. Like many poets of this period, she published religious and ethical works in the current idiom of the Jews. Such publications were facilitated by the printing-press of Gersonides then running in Prague. Among other pieces, she published, probably in 1609, a poem of six pages, under the title Ayn sheyn lid, nay gemakht, beloshn tkhine iz vorden ausgetrakht.
