= High Synagogue (Prague) =

Synagogue in Prague, Czech Republic

- Czech: Vysoká synagoga
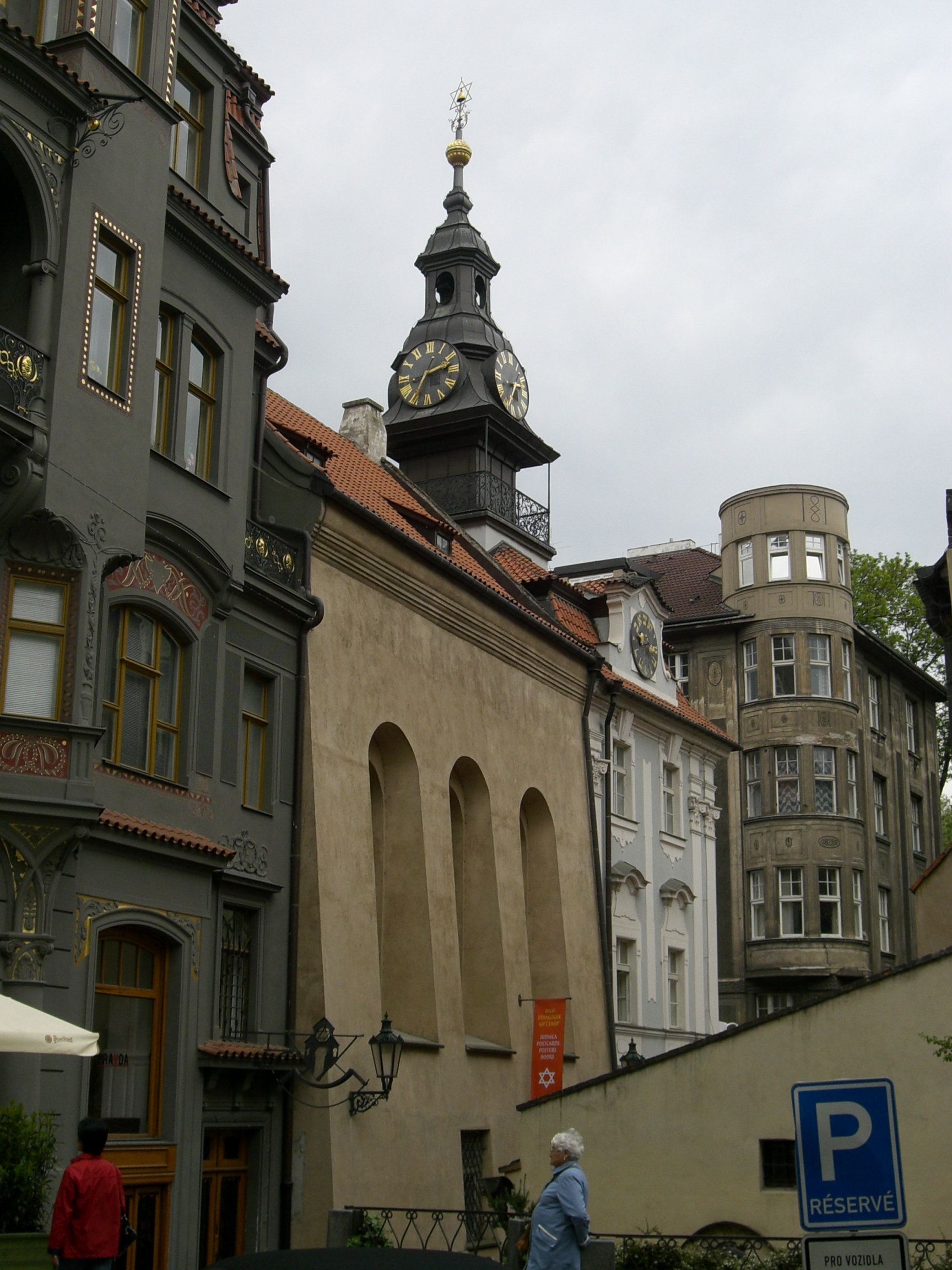
- The synagogue in 2007

- Location of the synagogue in the Czech Republic

Religion
- Affiliation: Judaism
- Ecclesiastical or organisational status: Synagogue
- Status: Active

Location
- Location: Červená Street (Red Street), Prague
- Country: Czech Republic
- Coordinates: 50°05′24″N 14°25′08″E

Architecture
- Architects: Pankratius Roder (1568); J. M. Wertmüller (1883)
- Style: Renaissance (1568); Gothic Revival (1883)
- Funded by: Mordechai Maisel (1568)
- Established: c. 1560s (as a congregation)
- Completed: 1568 (pre-fire); 1883 (post-fire)
- Destroyed: 1689 Great Fire (partial)

National Cultural Monument of the Czech Republic
- Official name: Vysoká synagoga
- Type: Synagoga
- Criteria: Objekt
- Designated: 13 December 1992
- Reference no.: 1000156774

The High Synagogue, also called the Vysoká Synagogue (Vysoká means High in Czech), the official name in Czech: Vysoká synagoga, also known under its German synonym die Hohesynagoge, or as בה"כ גבוה Bet HaKnesset Gvuah in Hebrew or הויכשול Hoykhshil in Yiddish, is a Jewish congregation and synagogue, located on Červená ulice (Red Street), Prague, in the Czech Republic. Used as a synagogue from 1568 until World War II, in the postwar times it has for some time become part of the Jewish Museum of Prague. After being restituted in the 1990s by the Jewish Community of Prague, it has once again been used as a symbol synagogue ever since. It is used on daily basis for services of the members of the orthodox Prague Jewish community.

The synagogue was listed as a cultural monument of the Czech Republic in 1992.

== History ==
=== 16th and 17th centuries ===
The High Synagogue was built in the High Renaissance style, financed by Mordechai Maisel, (Note: Maisel also funded the Maisel Synagogue.) completed in 1568. (Note: Also claimed to be completed in 1577.) Maisel was the Mayor of the Prague Jewish Town and the private synagogue was located adjacent to the Jewish Town Hall. The synagogue building served as the meeting place for the rabbinical court and the Jewish council. It was called the High Synagogue because of its position on the first floor of the Town Hall; with access available only via the Town Hall.

The synagogue building was designed by Pankratius Roder, an Italian, and was likely to be modelled after High Synagogue, Kraków, which was built in 1556 in Poland, and probably after buildings of Venice. The supervising builder was Rada. In the center of the building there was a bimah, surrounded by seats. Maisel gave pieces of Torah and silver tools to the synagogue. The stucco ceiling was Gothic ribbed vaulting.

The synagogue was partially destroyed by the 1689 Great Fire; and was subsequently reconstructed in 1691.

=== 19th and 20th century ===
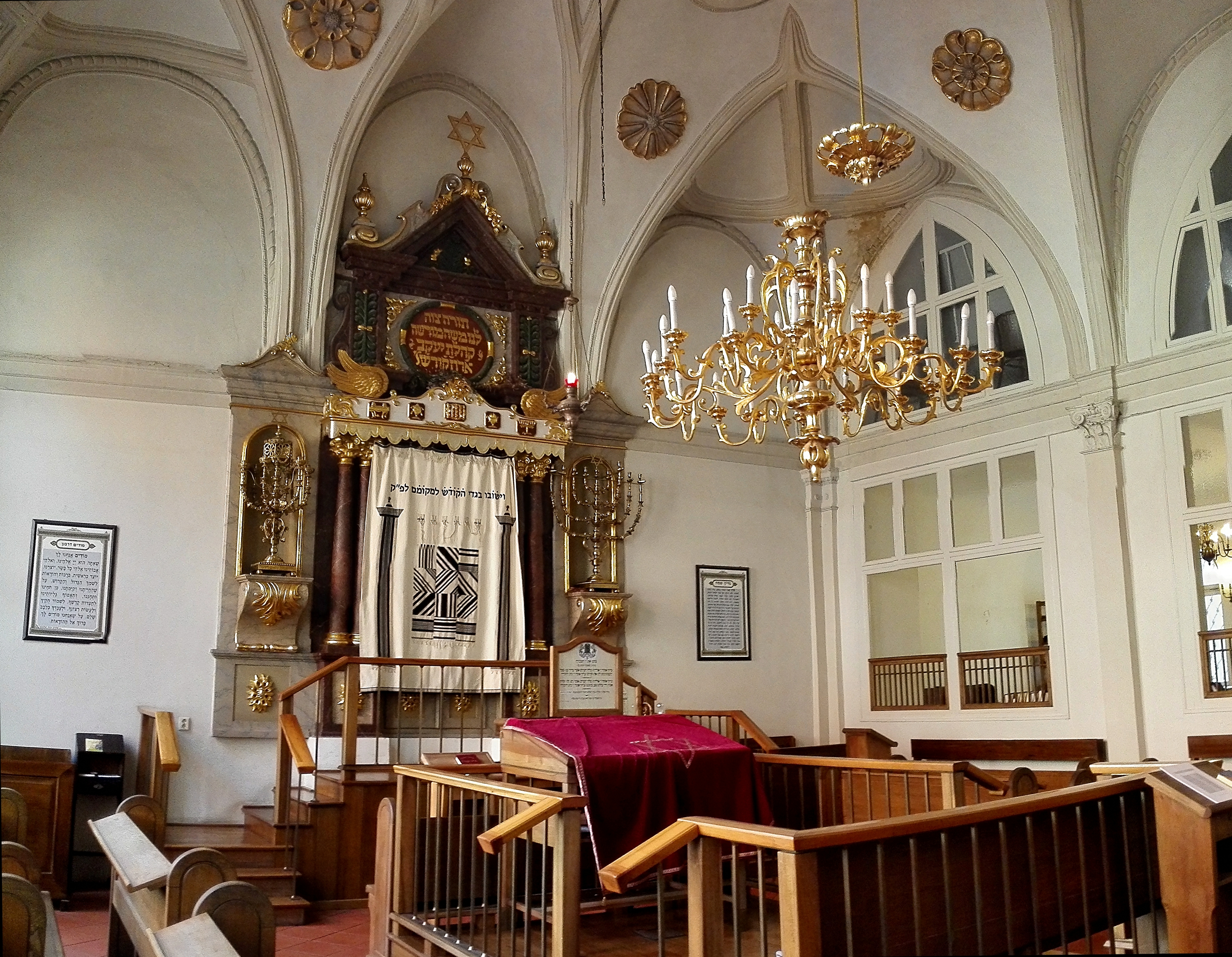
The interior

In 1883 the synagogue was rebuilt by J. M. Wertmüller. During this modification the façade was simplified to the more modern Gothic Revival appearance. The interior lunette vaults with decorative stucco work remained in their original Renaissance style. In 1907 the eastern entrance was closed, and a new entrance was made facing Červená Street (Red Street). Other reconstructions were made during 1961, 1974–79 and 1982.

The congregation worshiped in this location until the autumn of 1941, and then used as a warehouse during German occupation and Czech communist rule. After World War II, the Jewish community restored the synagogue, and from 1950 until 1992 the building served as a seat of the National Jewish Museum. Exhibitions of synagogue textiles was installed until 1982. In 1994 - 1996 the synagogue was restored and since 1997, it has again served the purposes of the Prague Jewish community’s chapel after a pause of nearly fifty years. The synagogue and the Jewish Town Hall together serve as a location for the midrasha.

== See also ==
- History of the Jews in the Czech Republic
- Cultural monument (Czech Republic)
