= Meisel family =

Rabbinic dynasty

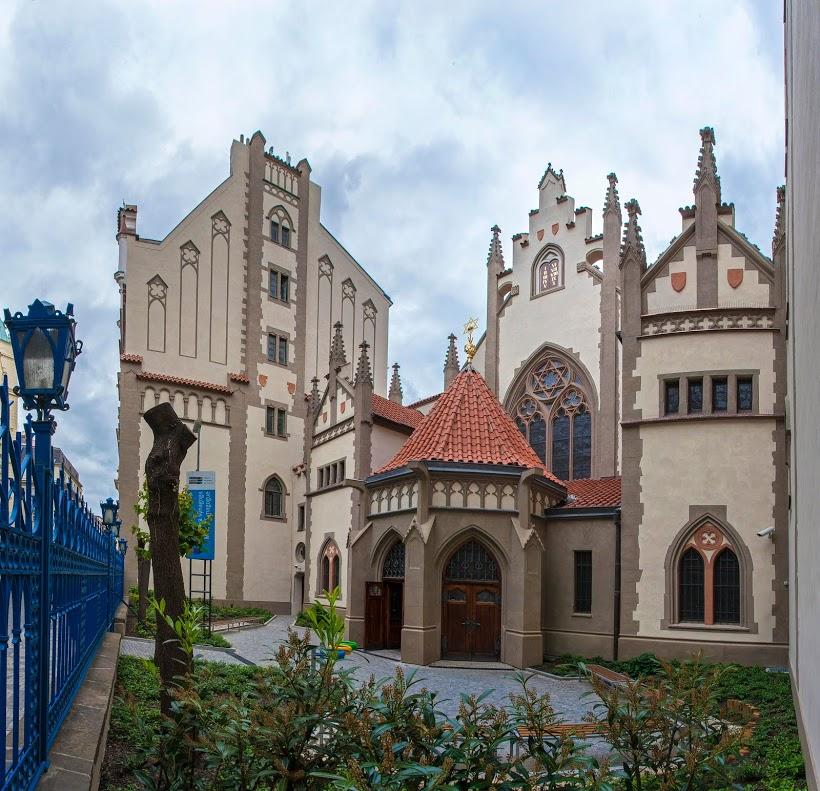
The Maisel Synagogue in Prague, built by Mordecai Meisel in 1590.

The Meisel family (also Meisels and Meizels) is a distinguished Bohemian rabbinic family originally from Prague, who descend from Yitskhak Eizik Meisels (b. 1425), a paternal 10th generation descendant of the Exilarch, Mar Ukba. From the early 16th century and onward, members of the family such as Mordecai Meisel achieved great economic prominence in Prague, becoming one of the wealthiest Bohemian Jewish families. It was also during this time that a branch of the family descending from Simcha Bunim Meisels (1545-1624) (the son-in-law of Moses Isserles) immigrated to Kraków, Poland due to rising Antisemitism in Bohemia. In Poland the family produced several rabbinic scholars, such as Dow Ber Meisels and Moses Bonems-Meisels. Among the families descendants are: Shabbatai HaKohen, Yitzchak Yaacov Reines, Alexander Sender Shor, John von Neumann, as well as the Peshischa, Sulitza, Ropshitz, Bobov, Biala, Kretshnif, and Kotzk Hasidic dynasties.
