= Maharsha =

Polish rabbi

Shmuel Eidels
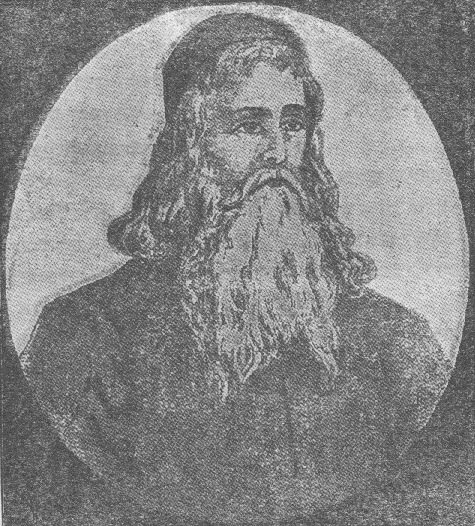
- Maharsha

Personal life
- Born: 1555 Kraków, Poland
- Died: 1631 (aged 75–76)

Religious life
- Religion: Judaism

Shmuel Eidels (1555 – 1631) (Hebrew: שמואל אליעזר הלוי איידלס Shmuel Eliezer HaLevi Eidels) was a renowned rabbi and Talmudist famous for his commentary on the Talmud, Chiddushei Halachot. Eidels is also known as Maharsha (מהרש״א, a Hebrew acronym for "Our Teacher, the Rabbi Shmuel Eidels").

== Biography ==
The Maharsha was born in the royal city of Kazimierz, a major Jewish center adjacent to Kraków (into which it was later absorbed), Poland. His father, Yehuda, was a Talmudist and both parents were descendants of rabbinic families—his mother Gitel was a cousin of Rabbi Yehuda Loew, the Maharal of Prague, and his father "was a direct descendant of Rabbi Yehuda HaChasid." From early childhood, the Maharsha's remarkable talents were evident. Maharsha studied and was a student of Rabbi Shalom Shachne in his yeshivah. When he came of marriageable age, the Maharsha was offered many prestigious shidduchim (marriage partners), but he rejected them, asserting that he wanted to devote himself solely to Torah study.

He married the daughter of Edel Lifschitz of Posen and the late Moshe Lifschitz, rabbi of Brisk. He then moved to Posen and, with his mother-in-law's financial help, established a yeshiva there. She supported it for over 2 decades, including "taking care of every bachur's needs."

In appreciation of her support he adopted her name. After her death, he served as rabbi in the following prominent communities: Chelm (1610), Lublin, Tiktin and Ostroh. Eidels was also active in the Council of Four Lands.

His son-in-law was R. Moses ben Isaac Bonems of Lublin, who authored his own novellæ on the Talmud, published with the Ḥiddushe Halakhot, last recension (Mahdura Batra).

The Maharsha died "5 days in(to) the month of Kislev, year" 5392.

== Works ==
Chiddushei Halachot (חידושי הלכות - "Novellae in Jewish Law") is an "incisive and keenly analytical" commentary on the Talmud, Rashi and Tosafot together, and with a focus on Tosafot. It is said that if one grasps the Maharsha, then one has understood the Tosafot. This commentary was quickly accepted and was printed in almost all editions of the Talmud. Chiddushei Halachot is based on Maharsha's teaching in his yeshiva, and he refrained from printing his commentary on those pages that were studied while he served on the Council of Four Lands.

The Maharsha also wrote an extensive commentary on the aggadot of the Talmud known as the Chiddushei Aggadot (חידושי אגדות - "Novellae in Aggadah") reflecting a wide knowledge of philosophy and Kabbalah. Maharsha on Aggados is a multi-volume translation by Rabbi Avraham Yaakov Finkel.

Upon the publication of his works, the Maharsha wrote that he regretted publishing the commentaries as two different works, rather than as one large intertwined work in the style of the Halacha and Aggada found in the Talmud; the Maharsha called upon future publishers to combine his works into one. Per the Maharsha's wishes, virtually all printed editions of his commentary found on the back of Gemaras today features the two works combined into one long running commentary with different fonts to differentiate between the Chiddushei Halachot and Chiddushei Aggadot.

In the book Leader of the Generation: Rabbi Ezra Attieh, it is stated that of all the commentaries written on the Torah, that of the Maharsha was the favorite of Rabbi Ezra Attieh.

== Legacy ==
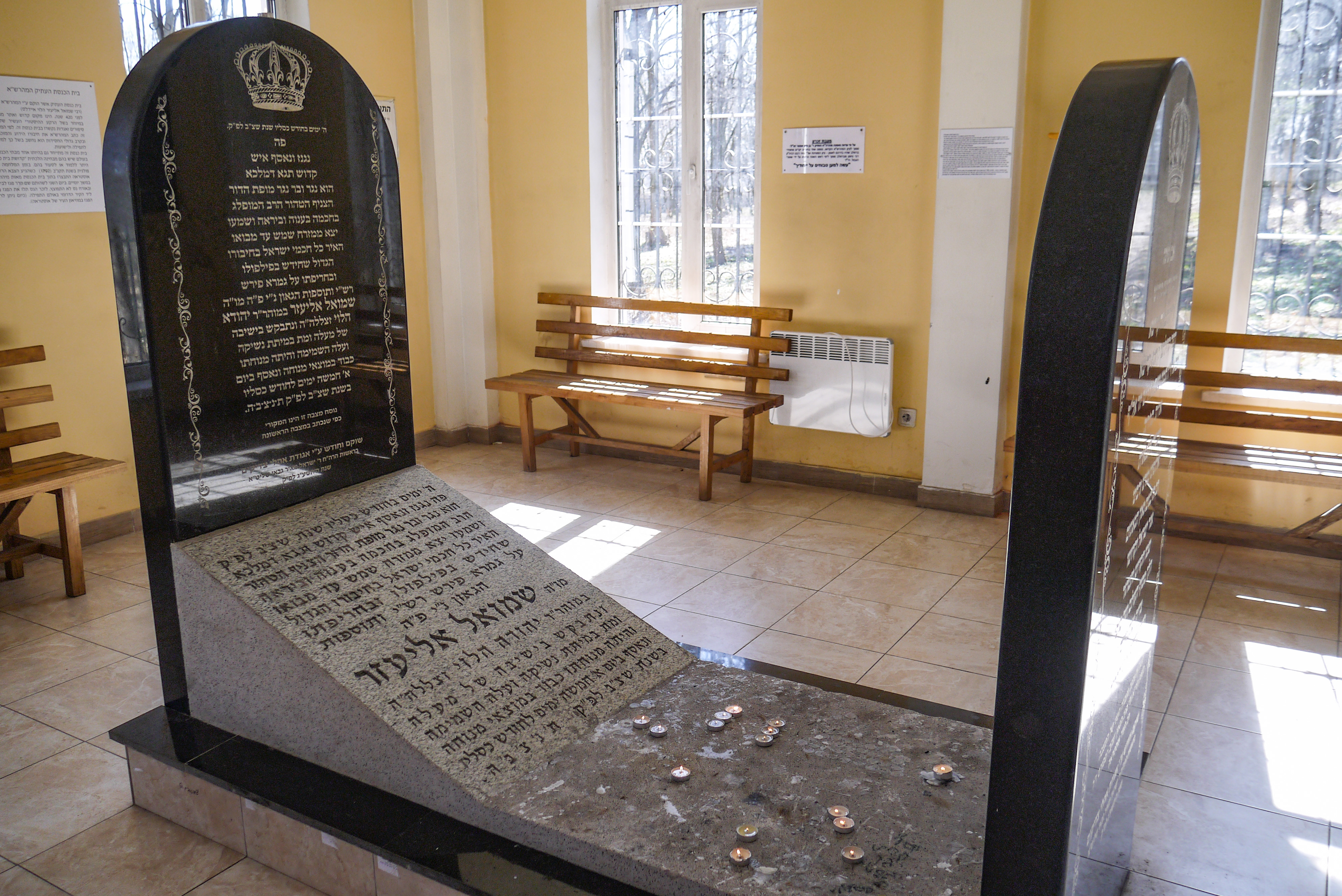
Maharsha grave in Ostroh

The Great Maharsha Synagogue in Ostroh (Ukraine) was named in his honour.
