= Moses ben Isaac Bonems =

Moses ben Isaac Bonems (Hebrew: משה בן יצחק בּוּנִימְז; c. 1600 – November 15, 1668) was a 17th-century Polish rabbi and talmudic scholar.

== Biography ==
Born around 1600 in Pinsk, Poland, his father Isaac Bonems was a renowned rabbi there, a descendant of Israel Isserlein, and a close relative of Shabbatai HaKohen. His mother Leah Meisels was the maternal granddaughter of Moses Isserles, and the daughter of Simcha Bunim Meisels, the founder of the Polish branch of the Meisels family. In his early years Moses Bonems married the daughter of Shmuel Eidels, with whom he had six children. He briefly served as a rabbi in Liuboml, later moving to Lublin, where he published novellæ on the Talmud, called Ḥiddushe Halakot Mahdura Batra (Lublin, 1670); the work was a revised edition of his father-in-law's work of the same name, and was widely received.

== Jewish Encyclopedia bibliography ==
- Dembitzer, Kelilat. Yofi, i.27a;
- Nissenbaum, Le-Ḳorot ha-Yehudim be-Lublin, p. 61, Lublin, 1899;
- Steinschneider, Cat. Bodl. col. 1825.
