= Jewish Town Hall (Prague) =

The Jewish Town Hall
- Židovská radnice
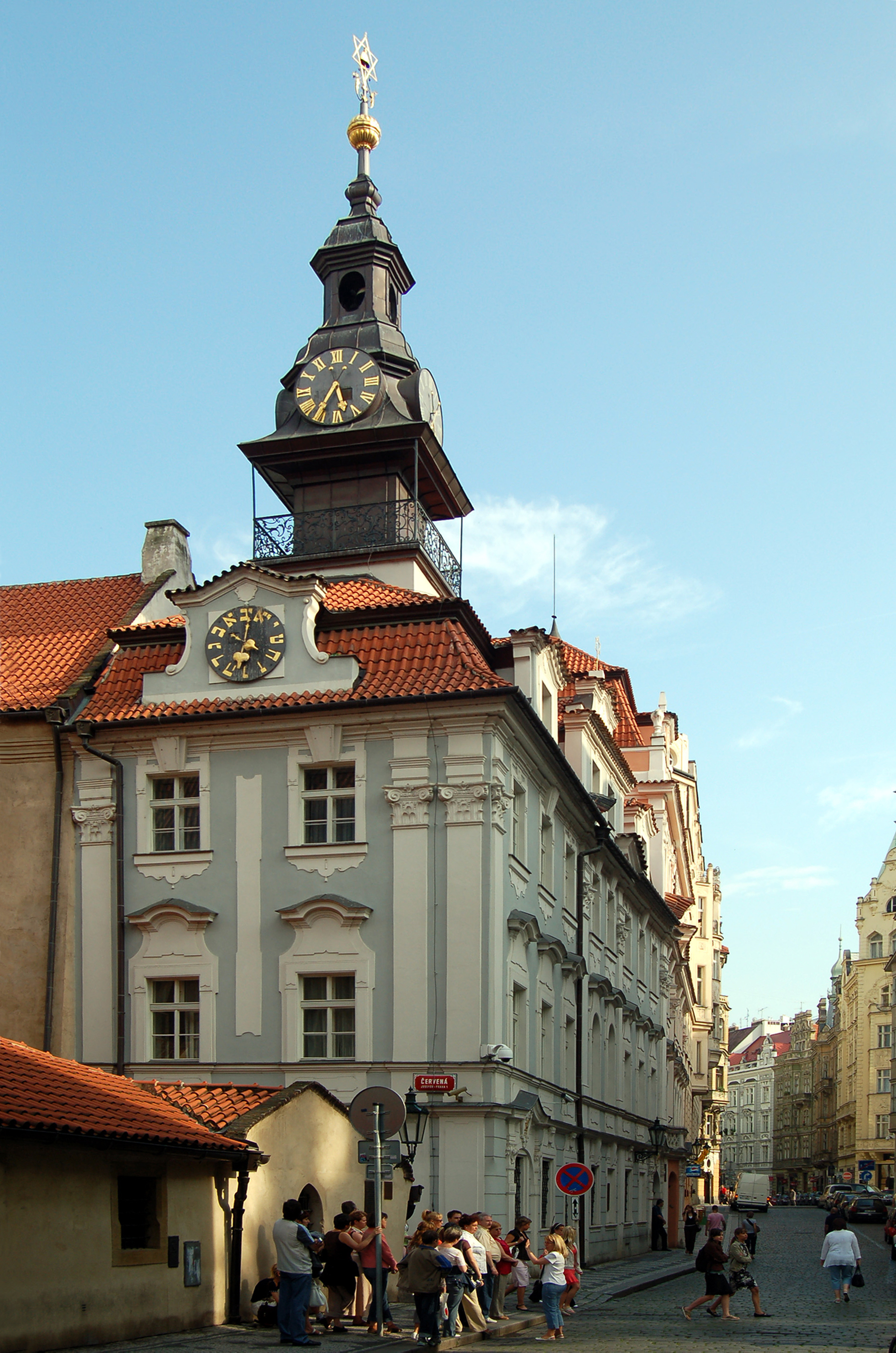
- The Jewish Town Hall
- Interactive map of the The Jewish Town Hall area

General information
- Location: Maiselova 250/18, Prague 1, 110 00, Prague, Czech Republic
- Coordinates: 50°05′22″N 14°25′07″E
- Completed: 1577
- Renovated: 1689, 1754

The Jewish Town Hall (Czech: Židovská radnice) in Josefov, Prague, was constructed adjacent to the Old New Synagogue on the corner of Maiselova and Červená Ulice in 1586 in Renaissance style under the sponsorship of Mayor Mordechai Maisel. It acquired its Rococo facade in the 18th century.

The building was the main meeting house of the local Jewish community but is currently closed to the public. It is perhaps best known for its two clocks, one on a tower with Roman numeral markings, the other, lower, has Hebrew numerals, which are the same as letters in the Hebrew alphabet. The Hebrew numerals begin with aleph and continue counterclockwise around the clock dial.

== See also ==
- Prague Orloj
