= David Gans =

German rabbi, historian, mathematician, astronomer

David Gans (David ben Shlomo Gans)
- דָּוִד בֶּן שְׁלֹמֹה גנז
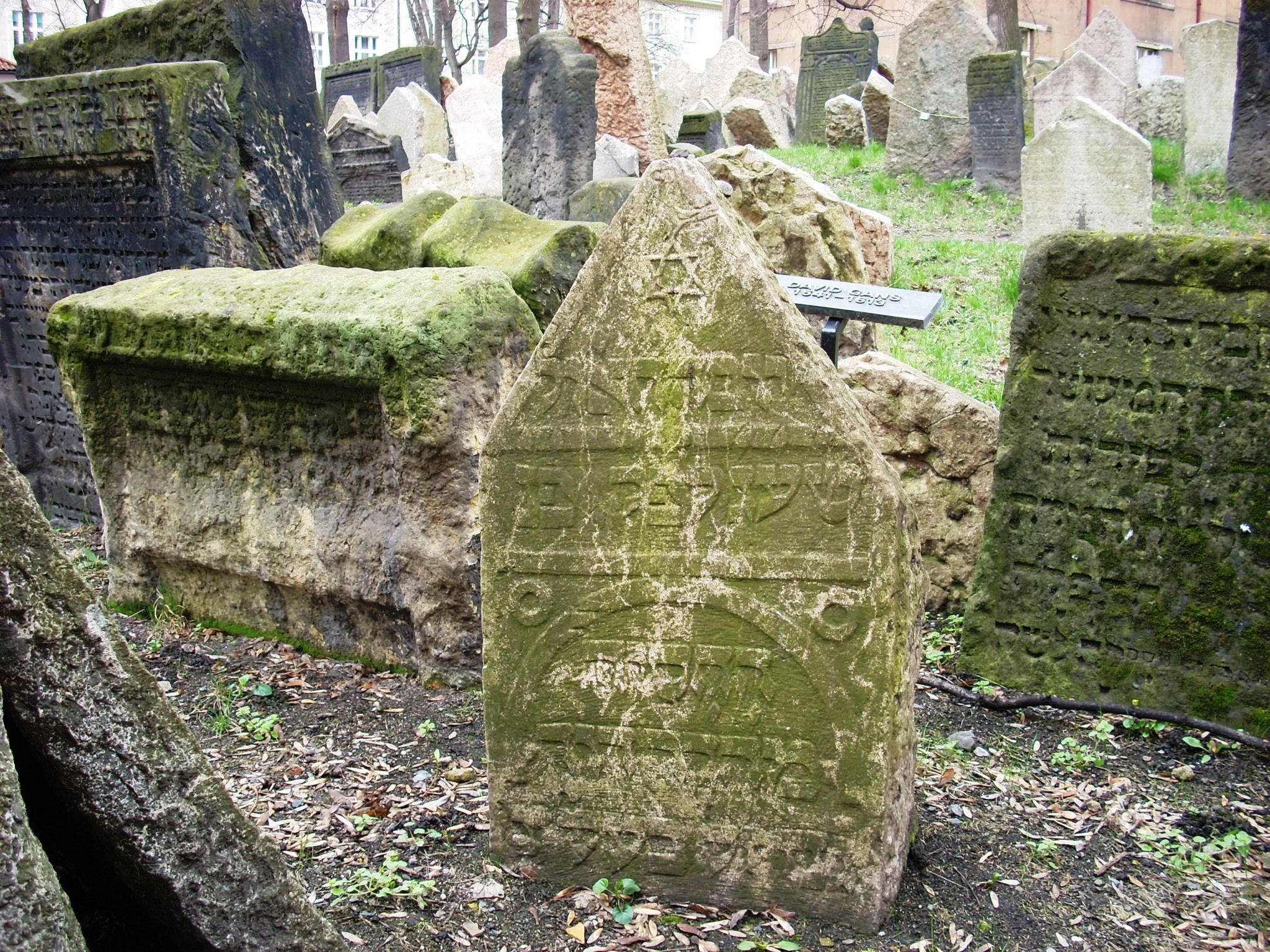
- Tombstone of Gans in Prague
- Born: 1541; Lippstadt
- Died: 25 August 1613 (aged 71–72); Prague, Bohemia
- Resting place: Old Jewish Cemetery, Prague
- Parent: Shlomo ben Seligman

David Gans (Hebrew: דָּוִד בֶּן שְׁלֹמֹה גנז; 1541 – 25 August 1613), also known as Rabbi Dovid Solomon Ganz, was a German-Jewish chronicler, mathematician, historian, astronomer and astrologer. He is the author of Tzemach David (1592) and therefore also known by this title, the צמח דוד.

== Biography ==
David was born in Lippstadt, in what is now North Rhine-Westphalia, Germany. His father, Shlomo, was a moneylender. He studied rabbinical literature in Bonn and Frankfurt, then in Kraków under Moses Isserles.

Later he attended the lectures of the Maharal of Prague and of his brother, Rabbi Sinai. They introduced philosophy, mathematics, and astronomy into the circle of their studies, and from them Gans received the impulse to devote himself to these branches of science. He lived for a time in Nordheim (where he studied Euclid), passed several years in his native city of Lippstadt, and then in about 1564 settled in Prague. There he came into contact with Kepler and Tycho Brahe, and took part for three consecutive days in astronomical observations at the Prague observatory. He was charged with the translation of the Alfonsine Tables from Hebrew into German by Tycho Brahe.

Gans was the first influential Jewish writer to reconcile Copernicanism. Gans wrote on a variety of liberal arts and scientific topics, making him unique among the Ashkenazi for his production of secular scholarship.

His grave in the Old Jewish Cemetery in Prague is marked with a Star of David and a goose (Gans' last name and the Yiddish word for goose, גאַנדז, are homophones). The star of David, in Hebrew called a "Magen David", alludes to his work titled Magen David.

== Writings ==
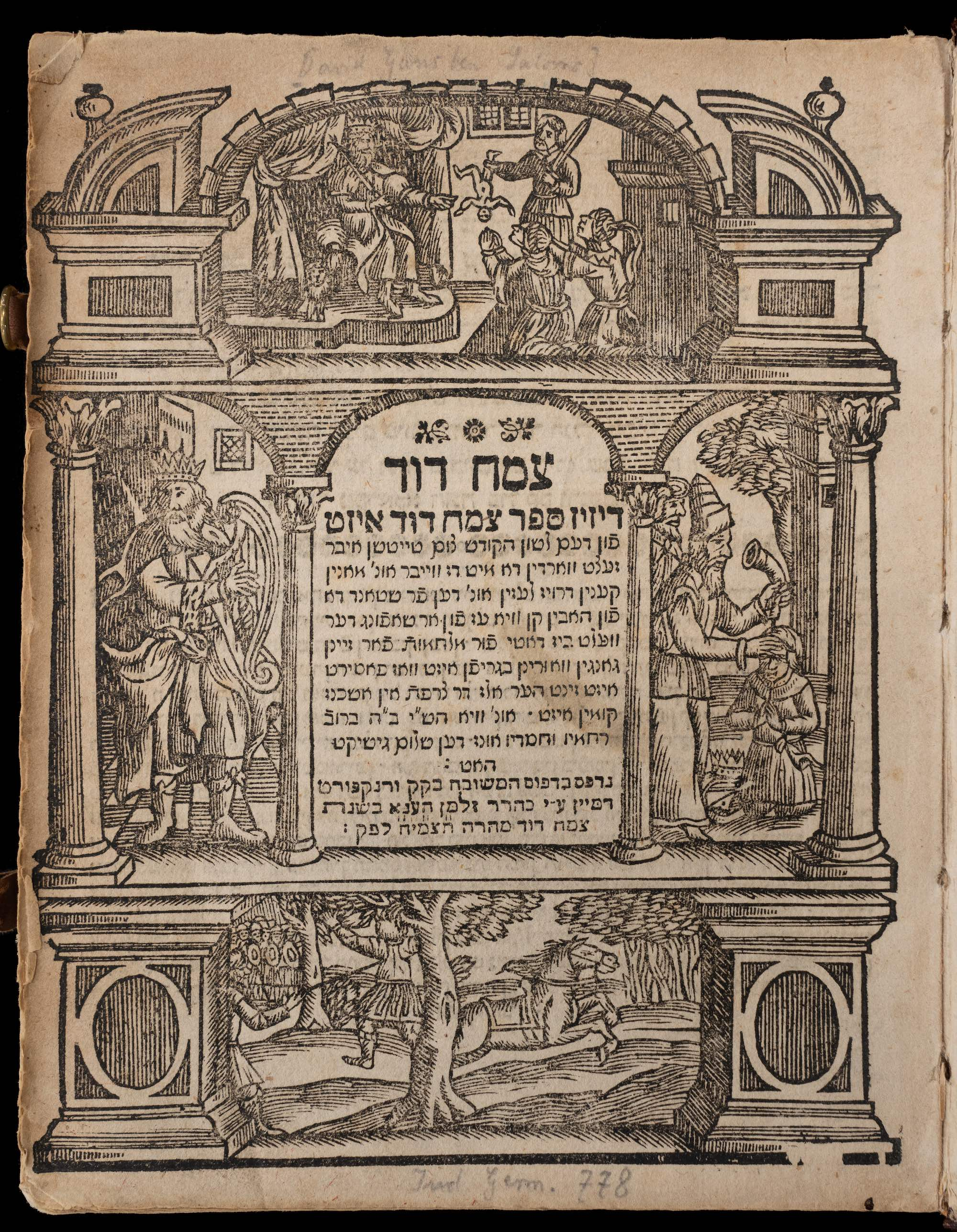
Tsemakh David, Frankfurt, 1698

Among Gans's works the most widely known is his history entitled Tzemach David, published first in Prague in 1592. It is divided into two parts, the first containing the annals of Jewish history, the second those of general history. The author consulted the writings of Cyriacus Spangenberg, Laurentius Faustus, Hubertus Holtzius, Georg Cassino, and Martin Borisk for the second part of his work. Gans's annals are memorable as the first work of this kind among the German Jews. In his preface to the second volume the author tries to justify writing about a "profane" subject like general history, and demonstrated that it was permitted to read history on Shabbat. Tzemach David was published in many editions. To the 1692 edition published in Frankfurt, David ben Moses Rheindorf added a third part containing the annals of that century, which addition has been retained in later editions of the Tzemach. The first part of Gans's work, and extracts from the second, were translated into Latin by Wilhelm Heinrich Vorst (Leyden, 1644). It was translated also into Yiddish by Solomon Hanau (Frankfurt, 1692). modern day translations also include English (1966, Hornier and Czech (2016, Šedinová)

Gans was also the author of Gebulat ha-Eretz, a work on cosmography, which is in all probability identical to the Zurat ha-Eretz, published in Constantinople under the name of "David Avazi" (avaz means "goose" in Hebrew, a reference to the surname Gans, which means "goose" in German); Magen David, an astronomical treatise, a part of which is included in the Nechmad ve'naim mentioned below; the mathematical works Ma'or ha-Ḳatan, Migdal David, and Prozdor, which are no longer in existence; Nechmad ve'naim dealing with astronomy and mathematical geography, published with additions by Joel ben Jekuthiel of Glogau at Jessnitz, 1743. This work is divided into 12 chapters and 305 paragraphs. In the introduction the author gives a historical survey of the development of astronomy and mathematical geography among the nations. Although acquainted with the work of Copernicus, Gans followed the Ptolemaic system, attributing the Copernican system to the Pythagoreans. He also ventures to assert that the prophet Daniel made a mistake in computation. A Latin translation of the introduction, and a résumé made by Hebenstreit, are appended to the Nechmad ve'naim.

Gans claims that Abraham and Solomon knew astronomy, and that the Egyptians learned astronomy from Jacob, which they then taught to the Greeks.

Gans took inspiration from Josippon and Maimonides. Gans' work is a hybrid of two parallel stories of world and Jewish history. While not as cutting-edge a historian as his contemporary, Azariah de Rossi, his books introduced historiography to the Ashkenazi audience, making him a forerunner of subsequent developments in Jewish culture. Gans' work can be seen as a defense of the traditional dissemination of knowledge.

== See also ==
- Judah Loew ben Bezalel
