= Maisel Synagogue =

Synagogue in Prague Czech Republic

- Czech: Maiselova synagoga
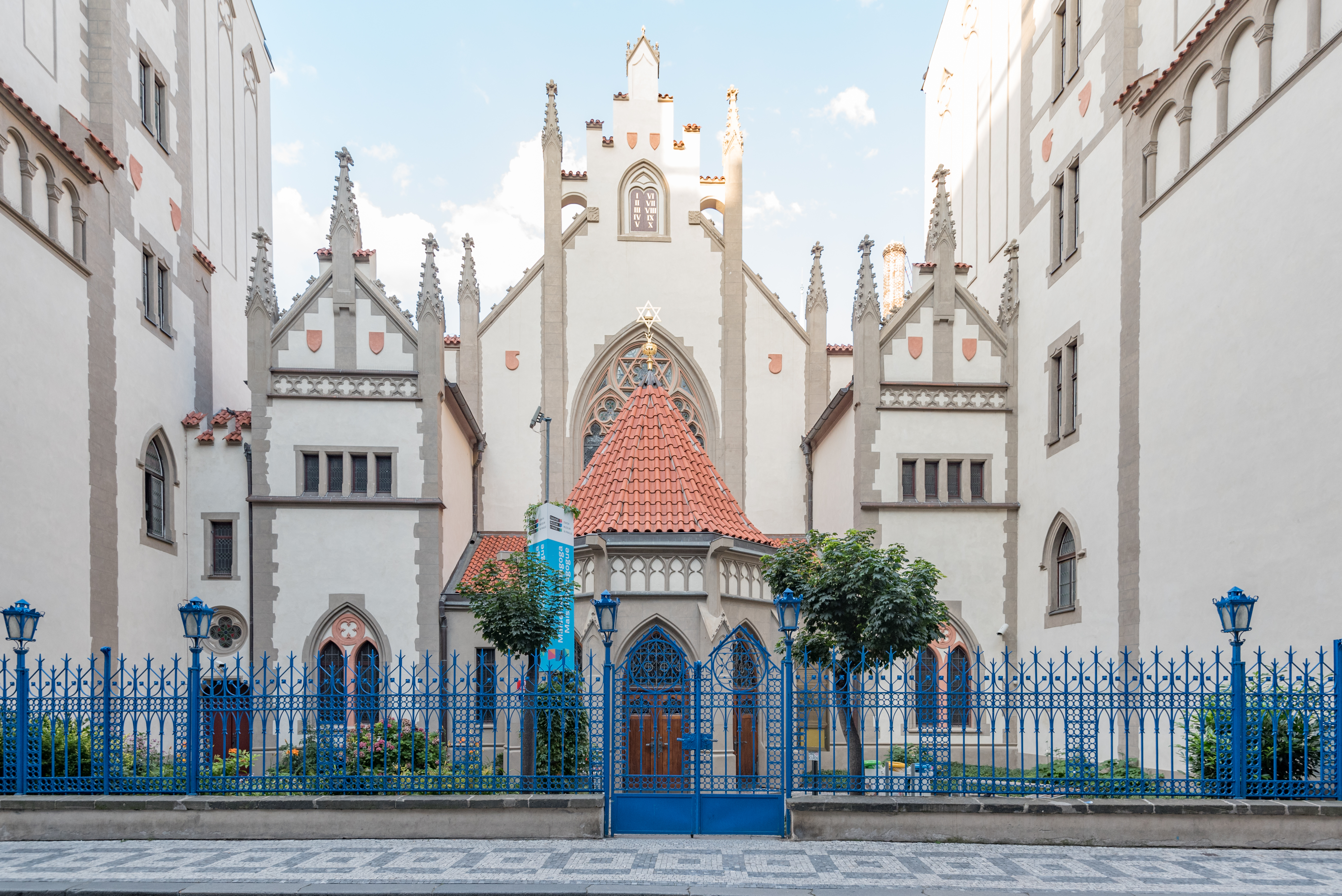
- The former synagogue, now museum, in 2017

- Location of the former synagogue, now museum, in the Czech Republic

Religion
- Affiliation: Judaism (former)
- Ecclesiastical or organisational status: Synagogue (1592–1938); Jewish museum (since c. 1960s)
- Status: Closed (as a synagogue); Repurposed

Location
- Location: Maiselova 10, Josefov, Prague
- Country: Czech Republic
- Coordinates: 50°05′19″N 14°25′07″E

Architecture
- Architects: Judah Coref de Herz (1592); J. M. Wertmüller (1864); Professor Alfred Grotte (1890s)
- Type: Synagogue architecture
- Style: Renaissance Revival (1592); Gothic Revival (1864)
- Funded by: Mordechai Maisel
- General contractor: Josef Wahl (1592)
- Established: 1590s (as a congregation)
- Completed: 1592

The Maisel Synagogue (Czech: Maiselova synagoga) is a Jewish congregation and synagogue, located in the former Jewish quarter of Prague, in the Czech Republic. The synagogue was built at the end of the 16th century in the Gothic Revival style. Since then its appearance has changed several times. The synagogue belongs to the Jewish Community of Prague and is administered by the Jewish Museum in Prague as a part of its exhibitions.

== History ==
=== The origin and first appearance of the synagogue ===
The construction of the synagogue was initiated by Mordechai Maisel. First, in 1590, this renowned businessman and benefactor of the ghetto gained the building site. One year later he obtained from the emperor Rudolf II, the current sovereign of the country, a privilege to build his own synagogue. Maisel had an important position at Rudolf's court and that probably helped him to gain this favour. The architectural plan for Maisel synagogue, designed by Judah Coref de Herz, was realized by Josef Wahl and in 1592, on Simchat Torah, the synagogue was consecrated. For the next century it became the largest and most impressive building in the ghetto, also thanks to its abundant equipment. Maisel bequeathed the synagogue to the Prague Jewish community, yet after his death in 1601 all his possession, including the synagogue, was confiscated (in spite of another imperial privilege, allowing Maisel to write a testament). Maisel's last will was therefore fulfilled entirely only after a number of trials, several decades later.

=== Later changes ===
In 1689 the synagogue was severely damaged by fire that affected the whole ghetto. It was reconstructed in a hurry and lost one third of its length. Again in 1754 the synagogue was devastated by fire. It was reconstructed in 1864, according to architectural plan of J. W. Wertmüller and again at the turn Professor Alfred Grotte, an architect, reconstructed the synagogue in the Gothic Revival style.

=== Modern history ===
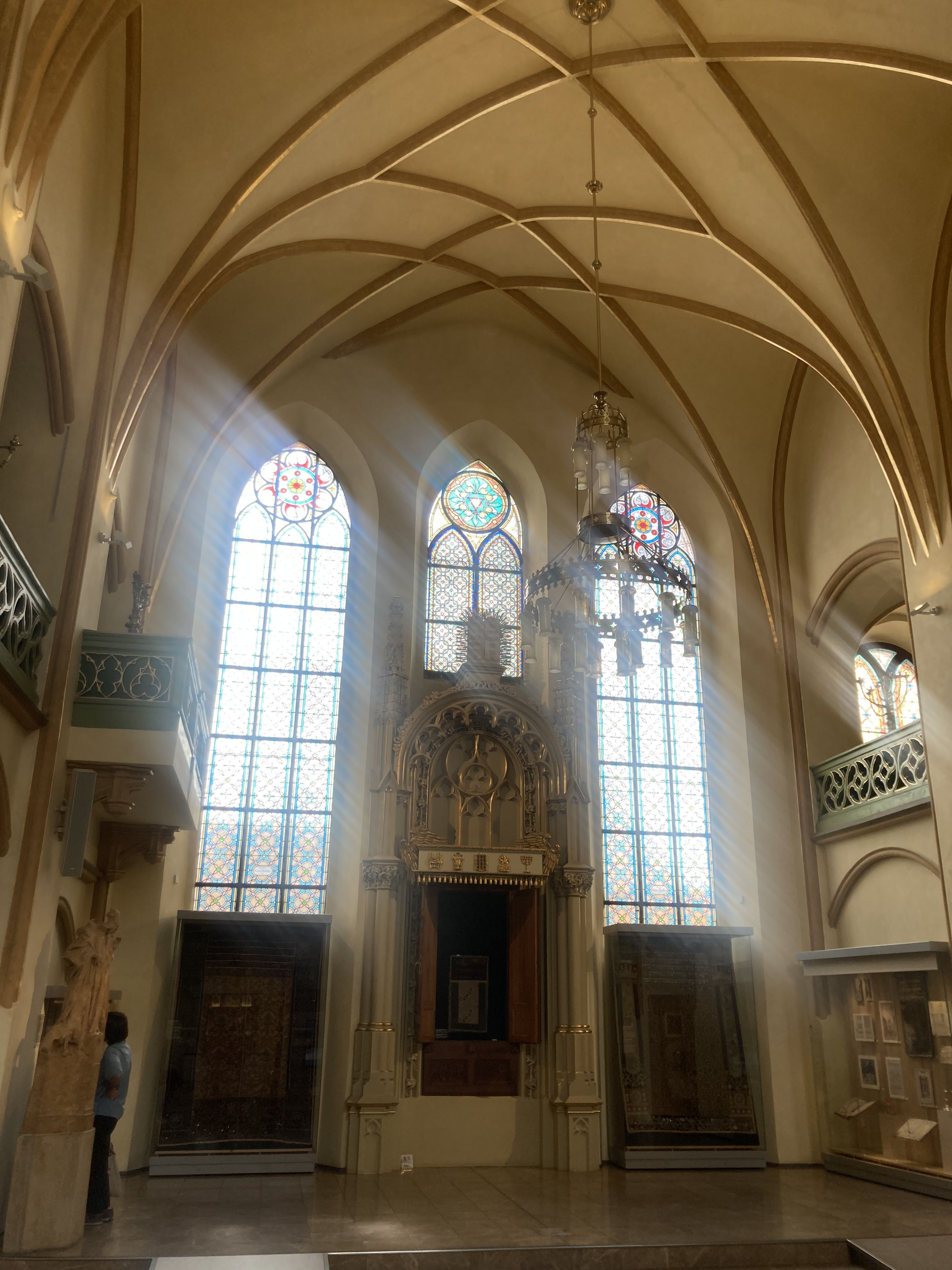
Interior of Maisel Synagogue

During the Nazi occupation of the Czech lands, properties of the Czech Jewish communities were stored in Maisel Synagogue. After the World War II the synagogue became a depository of Jewish Museum in Prague. During the sixties it was restored and between 1965 and 1988 an exposition of silver Judaica was located there. Then the synagogue was closed because of deplorable technical conditions of the building, which could not be improved due to a lack of financial means. After the Velvet revolution, the needed repairs & reconstruction of the building occurred; changing its purpose from a synagogue to a museum which opened for visitors in 1996, showing an exposition of Jewish history in the Czech lands from the beginning (9th century) through the age of Enlightenment which meant a turning point in Jewish social status. After the recent restoration of Maisel Synagogue, this exposition has been updated (modern and interactive elements added), its topic, however, has remained the same.

== Recent reconstruction ==
The recent reconstruction took place between April 2014 and June 2015. In opposite to previous unified white colour of outside and inside, the decorative elements were accentuated so the synagogue looks the same as at the beginning of the 20th century. Thanks to the reconstruction the synagogue also provides more comfort to its visitors including barrier-free entrance. It will be opened for cultural events as well (concerts, author reading, one-man theatre etc.).

== See also ==
- History of the Jews in the Czech Republic
- Meisel family
