= Old New Synagogue =

Medieval synagogue in Prague, Czech Republic

- Czech: Staronová synagoga Yiddish: אַלט־נײַ שול; Hebrew: בית הכנסת ישן-חדש
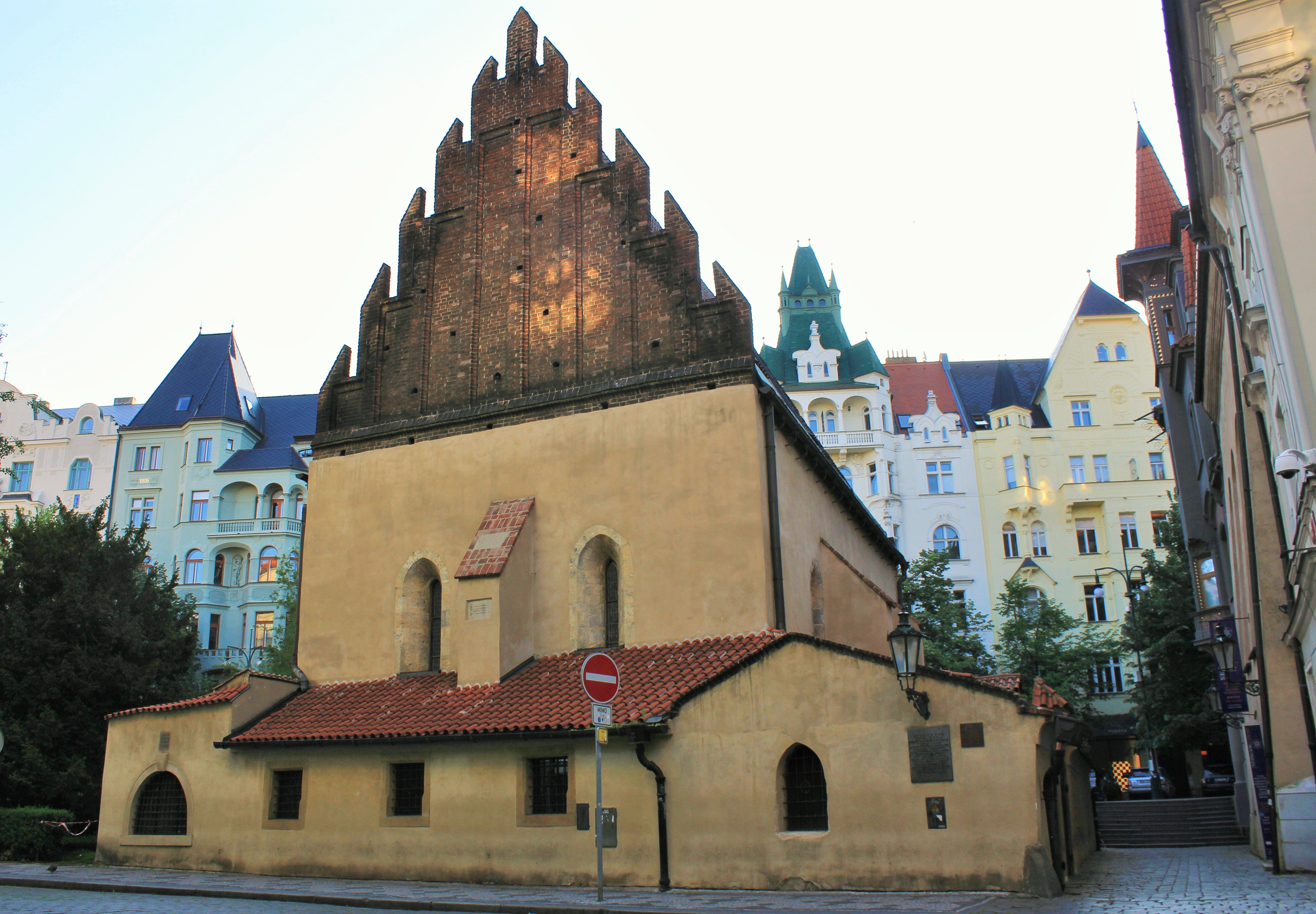
- View from the west

- Location of the synagogue in the Czech Republic

Religion
- Affiliation: Orthodox Judaism
- Rite: Nusach Ashkenaz
- Ecclesiastical or organizational status: Synagogue
- Status: Active

Location
- Location: Prague, Bohemia
- Country: Czech Republic
- Interactive map of Old New Synagogue
- Coordinates: 50°05′24″N 14°25′07″E

Architecture
- Type: Synagogue architecture
- Style: Gothic
- Completed: 1270

Website
- synagogue.cz

The Old New Synagogue (Czech: Staronová synagoga; German: Altneu-Synagoge), also called the Altneuschul, is an Orthodox Jewish congregation and synagogue, located in Josefov, Prague, in the Czech Republic. The synagogue is Europe's oldest active synagogue. (Note: The Scolanova Synagogue in Italy, also 13th century, was converted to a church by 1380 but was restored to synagogue use in 2006.) Completed in 1270, it is also the oldest surviving medieval synagogue of twin-nave design.

It is one of the earliest Gothic buildings in Prague. A still older Prague synagogue, known as the Old Synagogue, was demolished in 1867 and replaced by the Spanish Synagogue.

== Etymology ==
The synagogue was originally called the New or Great Synagogue and later, when newer synagogues were built in the 16th century, it became known as the Old-New Synagogue. Another explanation derives the name from the Hebrew עַל תְּנַאי (al tnay), which means "on condition" and sounds identical to the Yiddish "alt-nay," or old-new. According to legend angels have brought stones from the Temple in Jerusalem to build the Synagogue in Prague—"on condition" that they are to be returned, when the Messiah comes, i.e., when the Temple in Jerusalem is rebuilt and the stones are needed.

== Interior ==
Nine steps lead from the street into a vestibule, from which a door opens into a double-nave with six vaulted bays. This double-nave system was most likely adapted from plans of monasteries and chapels by the synagogue's Christian architects. The molding on the tympanum of the synagogue’s entryway has a design that incorporates twelve vines and twelve bunches of grapes, said to represent twelve tribes of Israel. Two large pillars aligned east to west in the middle of the room each support the interior corner of four bays. The bays have two narrow Gothic windows on the sides, for a total of twelve, again representing the twelve tribes. The narrow windows are probably responsible for many older descriptions of the building as being dark; it is now brightly lit with several electric chandeliers.

The vaulting on the six bays has five ribs instead of the typical four or six. It has been suggested that this was an attempt to avoid associations with the Christian cross. Many scholars dispute this theory, pointing to synagogues that have quadripartite ribs, and Christian buildings that have the unusual five rib design.

The bimah from which Torah scrolls are read is located between the two pillars. The base of the bimah repeats the twelve vine motif found on the tympanum. The Aron Kodesh where the Torah scrolls are stored is located in the middle of the customary eastern wall. There are five steps leading up to the Ark and two round stained glass windows on either side above it. A lectern in front of the ark has a square well a few inches below the main floor for the service leader to stand in.

The twelve lancet windows in the synagogue, which directed light towards the bimah, apparently led members to compare the structure with Solomon's Temple.

The synagogue follows orthodox custom, with separate seating for men and women during prayer services. Women sit in an outer room with small windows looking into the main sanctuary. The framework of the roof, the gable, and the party wall date from the Middle Ages.

An unusual feature found in the nave of this synagogue is a large red flag near the west pillar. In the centre of the flag is a Star of David and in the centre of the star is a "Jewish hat." Both the hat and star are stitched in gold. Also stitched in gold is the text of Shema Yisrael. Ferdinand III, Holy Roman Emperor awarded the Jewish community their own banner in recognition for their services in the defence of Prague during the Thirty Years War. The banner now on display is a modern reproduction.

== Golem of Prague ==
It is said that the body of a Golem (created by Rabbi Judah Loew ben Bezalel) lies in the attic where the genizah of Prague's community is kept. A legend is told of a Nazi agent during World War II entering the genizah, but who perished mysteriously. In the event, the Gestapo apparently did not enter the attic during the war, and the building was spared during the Nazis' destruction of synagogues. The lowest three meters of the stairs leading to the attic from the outside have been removed and the attic is not open to the general public. Renovation in 1883, and exploration of the attic in August 2014, found no trace of a golem.

== See also ==
- History of the Jews in the Czech Republic
- Old Synagogue (Prague), also known as the Spanish Synagogue
- Oldest synagogues in the world

== Gallery ==
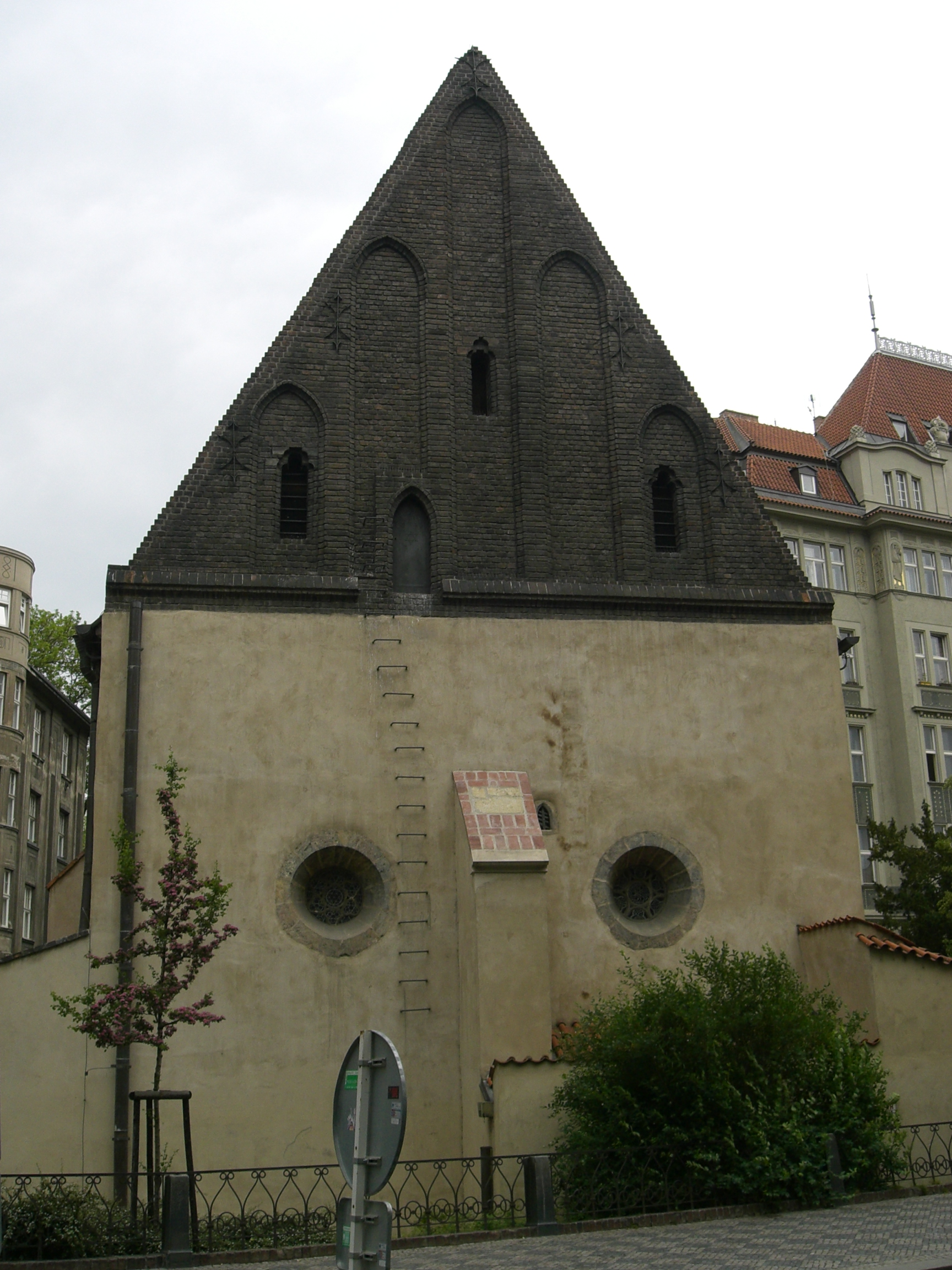
The eastern facade

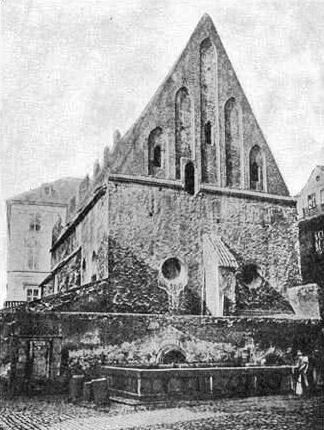
The Old New Synagogue before 1906

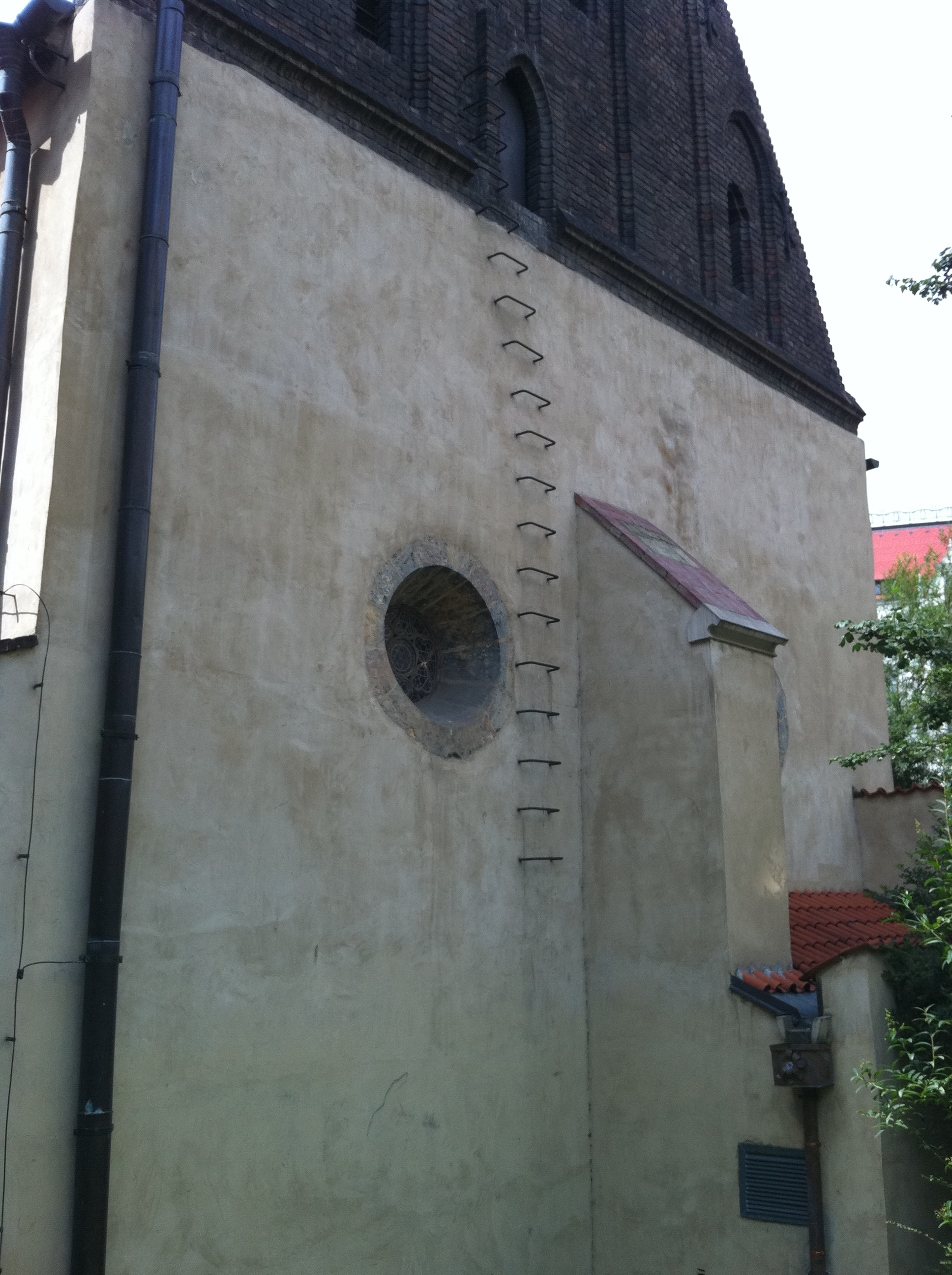
Rear with ladder to attic

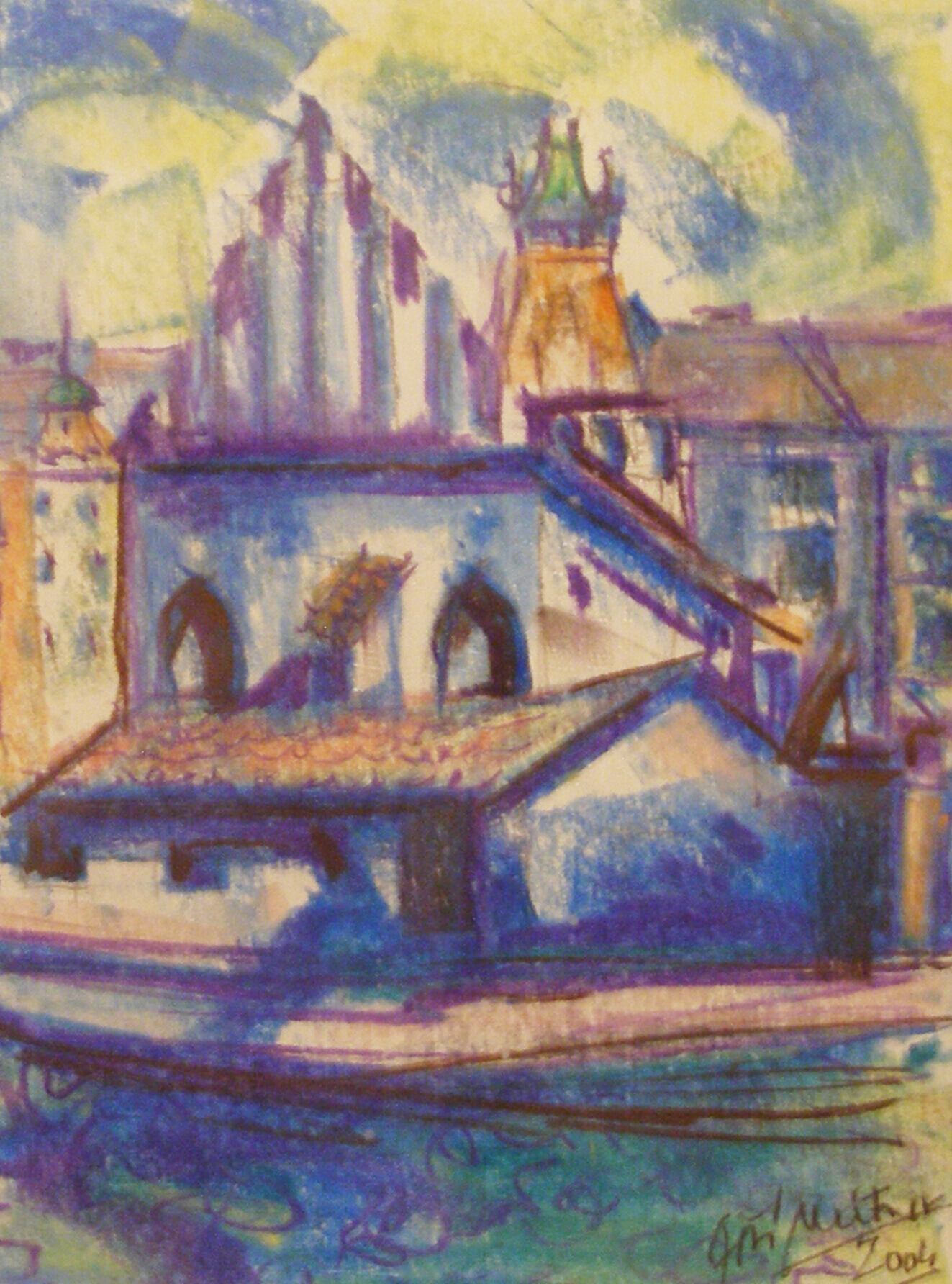
Old New Synagogue by painter Jiří Meitner

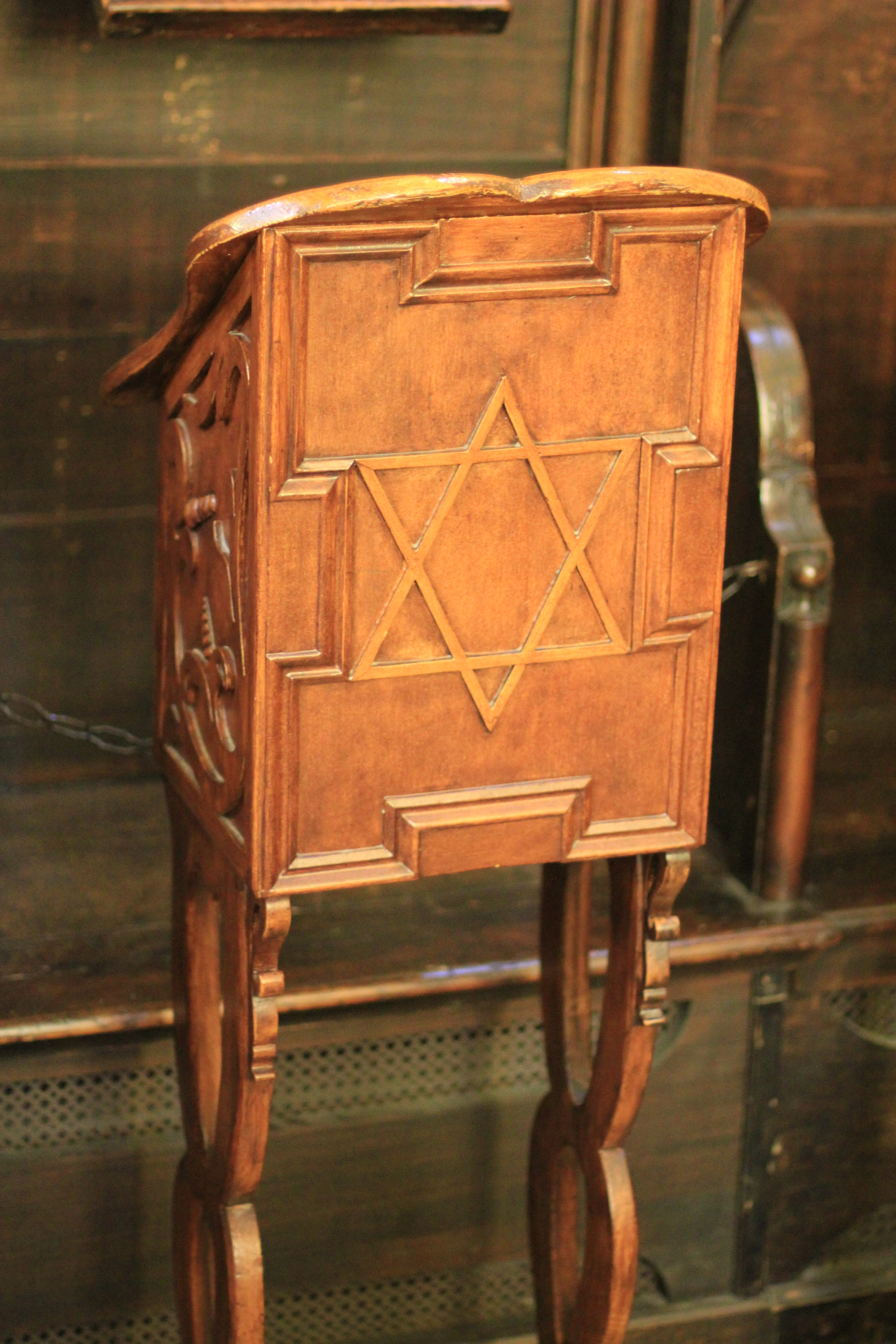
Rabbi Loew's chair

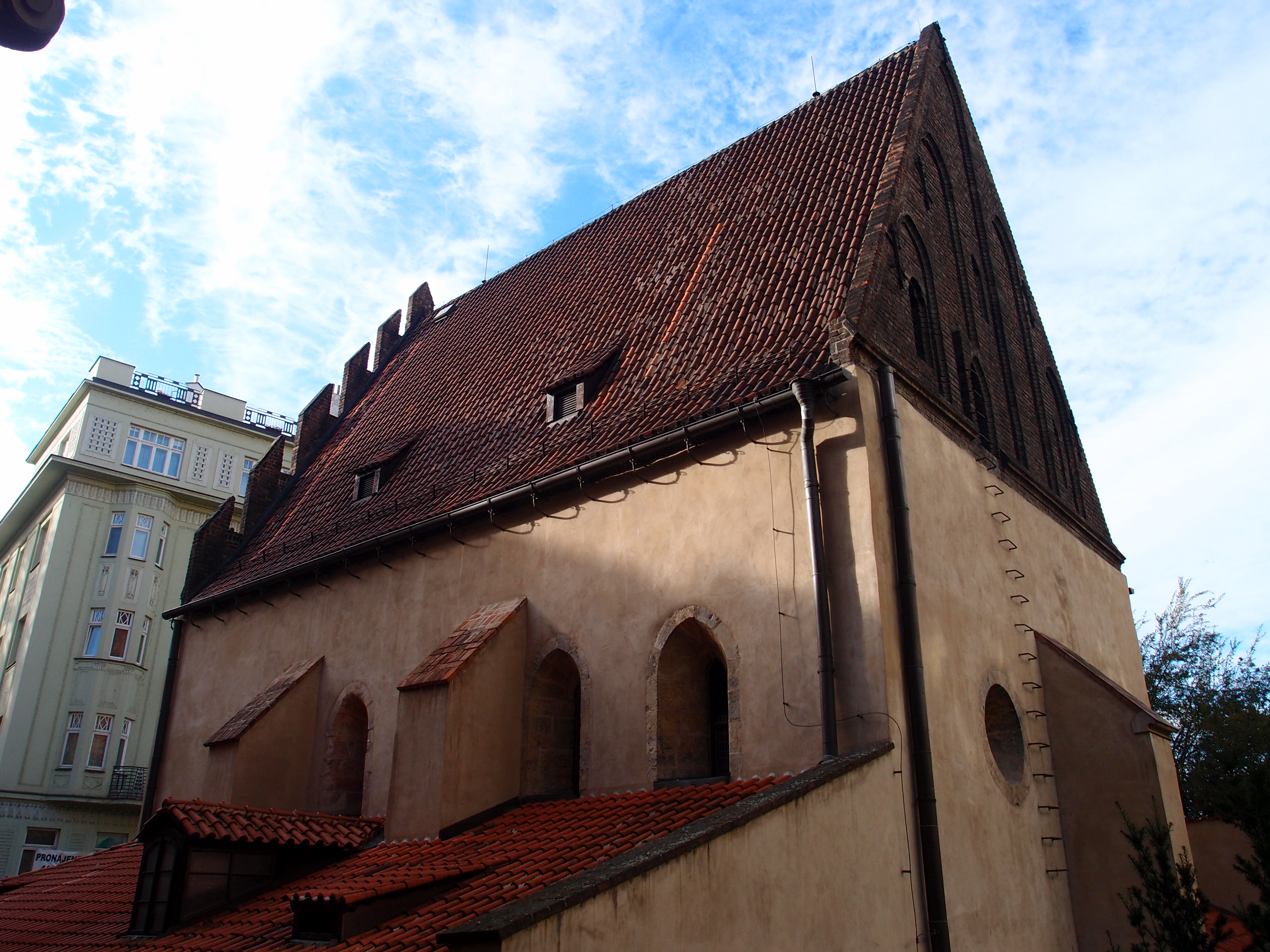
View from the south-east

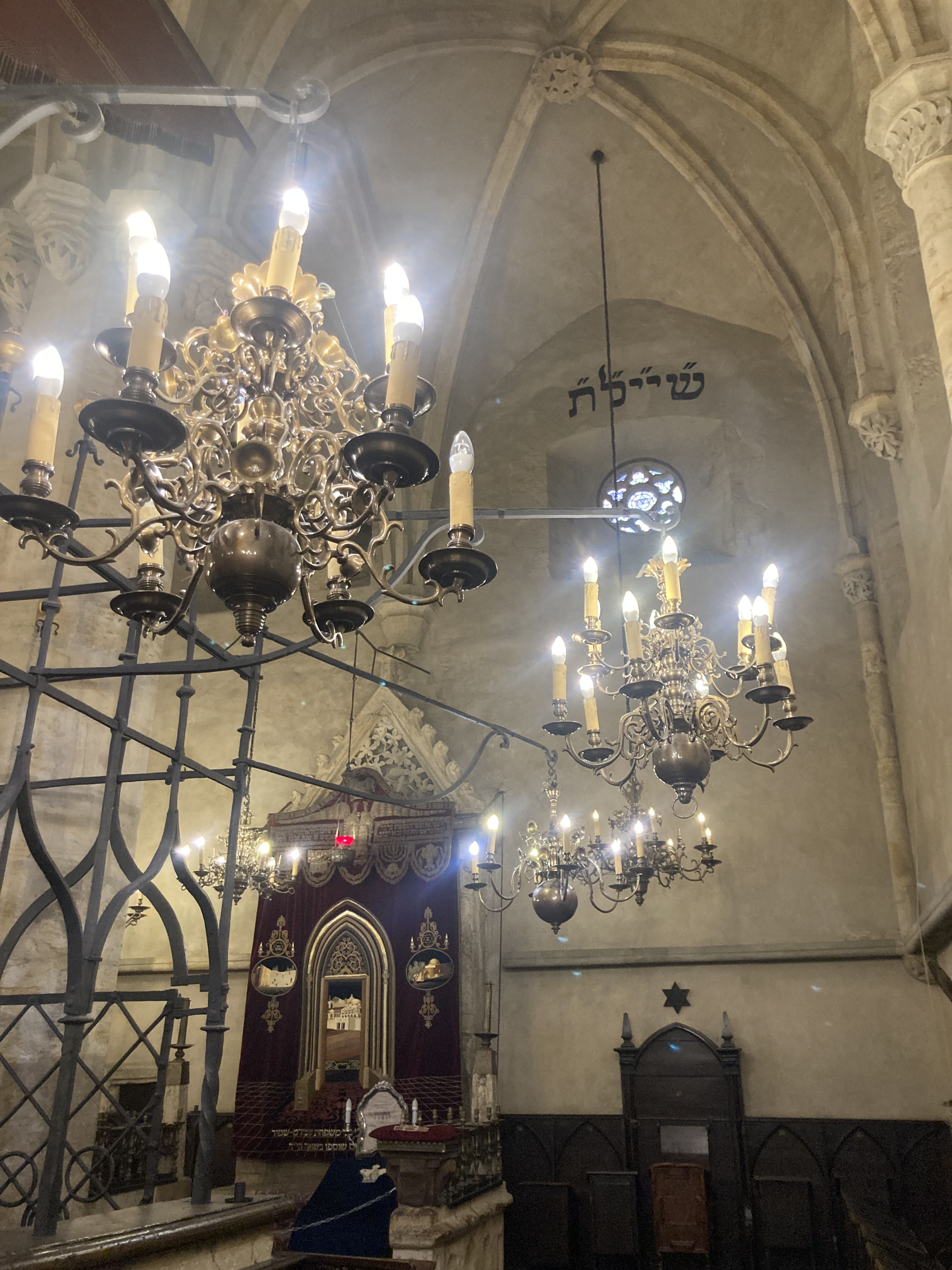
Interior

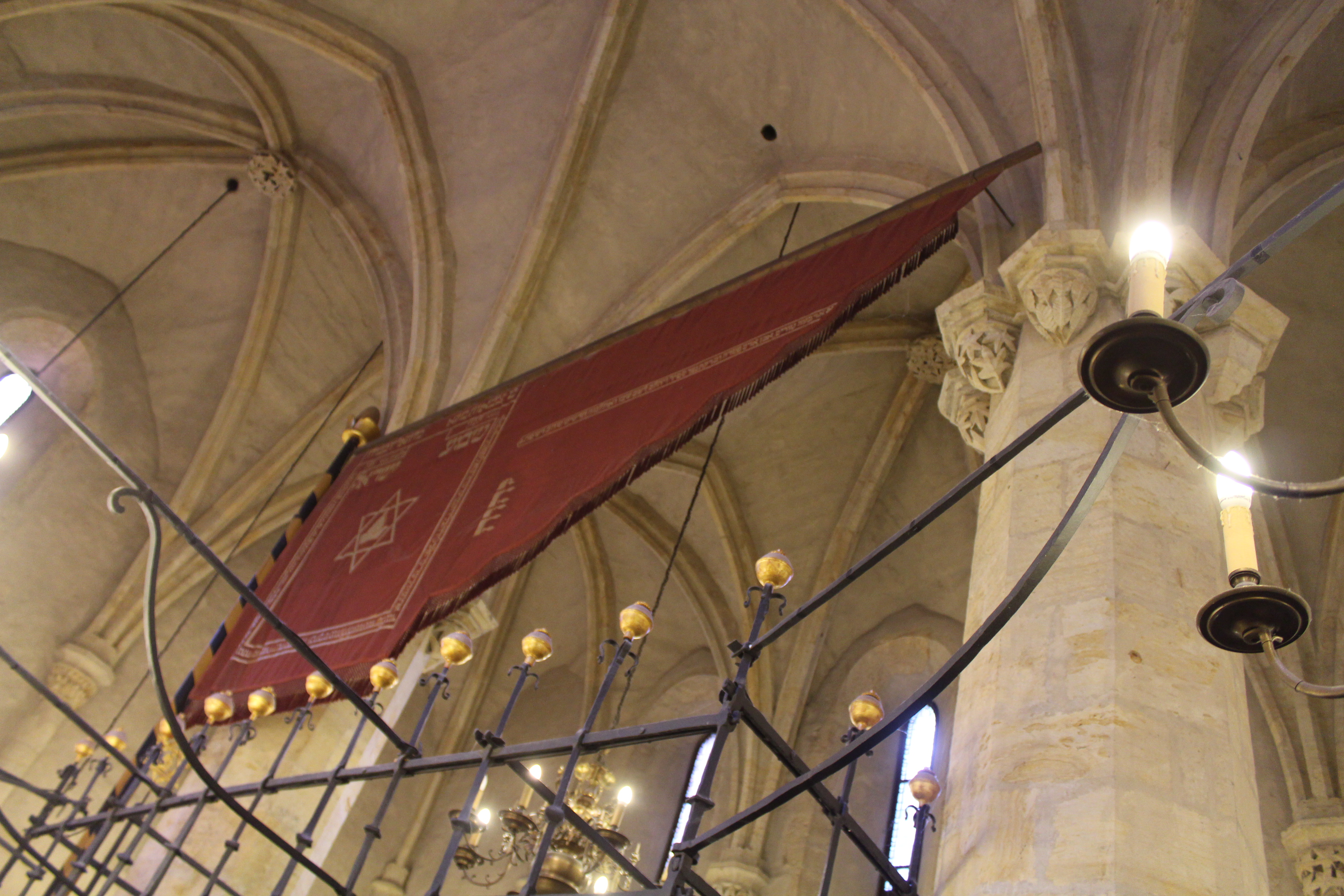
View of the "Jewish Flag"

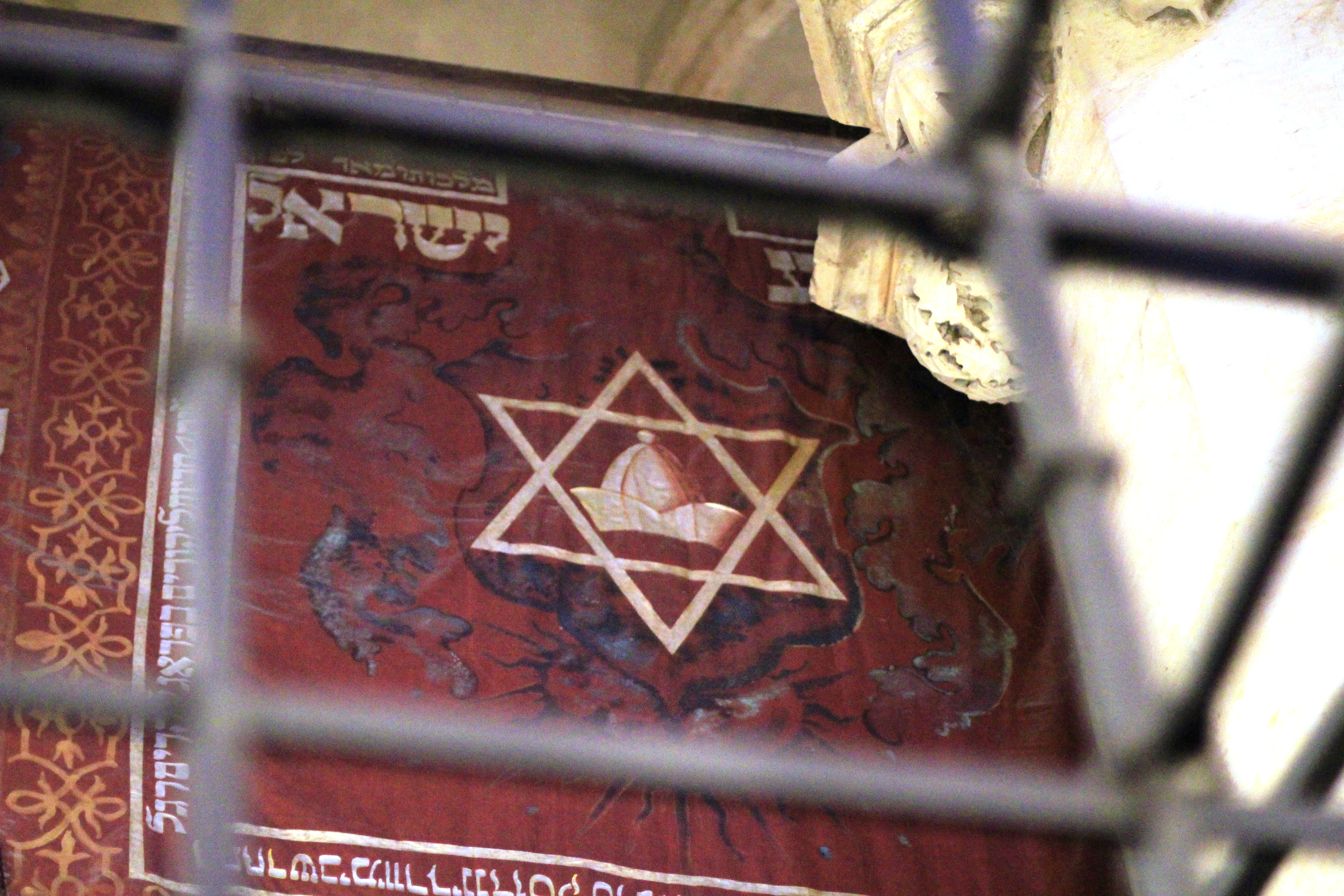
Close up of the "Jewish Flag" with the "Jewish Hat"

== Bibliography ==
- Pařík, Arno (2000). Pražské Synagogy: Prague Synagogues. Jewish Museum in Prague. ISBN 80-85608-33-2.
