= History of Prague =

Historical affiliations

Duchy of Bohemia c. 870–1198
Kingdom of Bohemia 1198–1918
(Czechoslovakia) First Czechoslovak Republic 1918-1938
(Czechoslovakia) Second Czechoslovak Republic 1938-1939
Protectorate of Bohemia and Moravia 1939–1945
(Czechoslovakia) Third Czechoslovak Republic 1945-1948
(Czechoslovakia) Czechoslovak Socialist Republic 1948-1990
(Czechoslovakia) Czech and Slovak Federative Republic 1990-1992
Czech Republic 1993-present

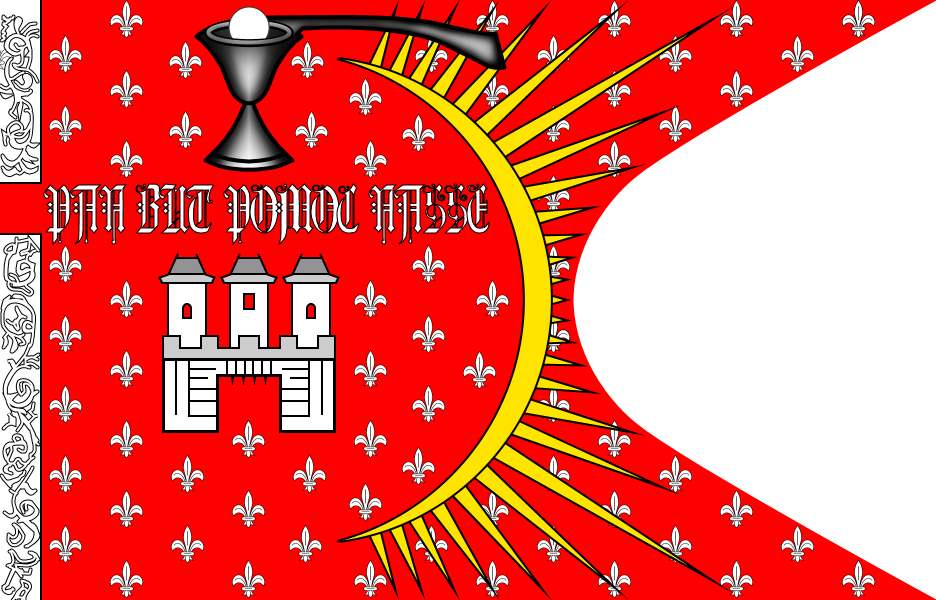
Depiction of the "Prague Banner" (municipal flag dated to the 16th century)

The coat of arms of Prague (1649)

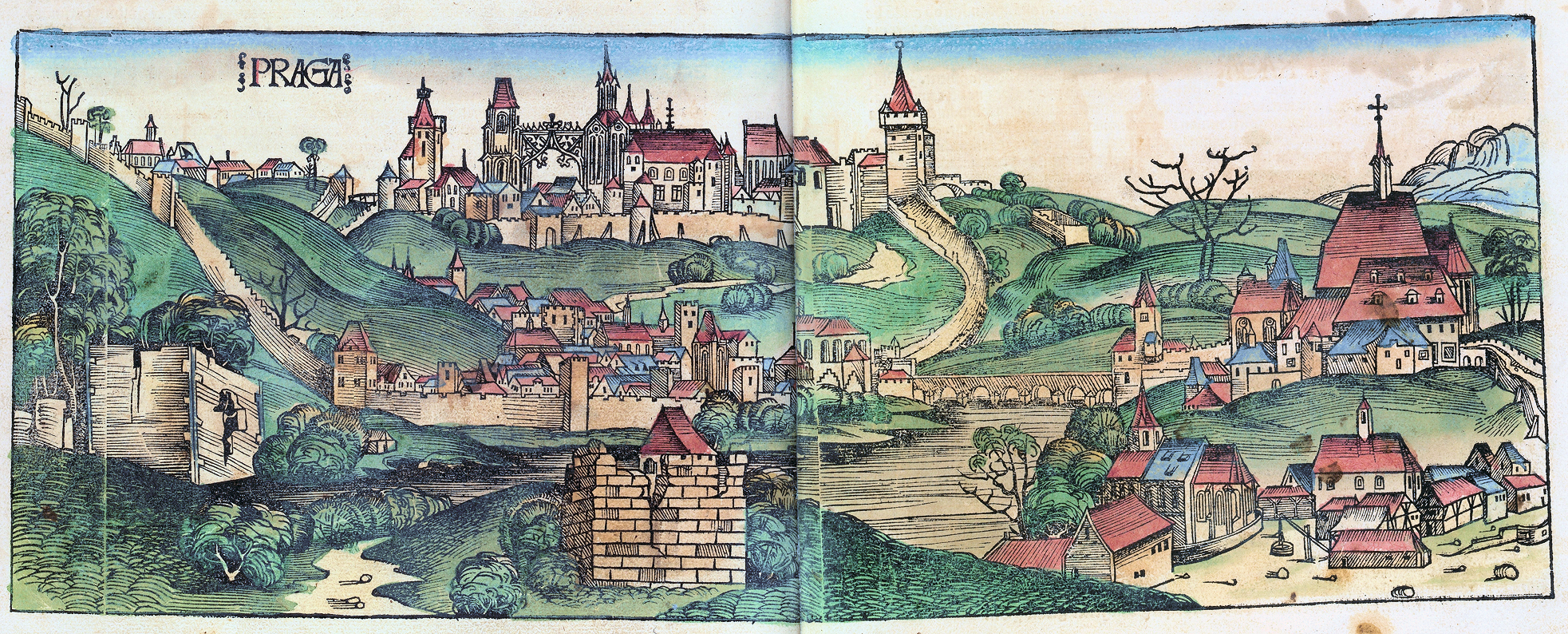
Prague in 1493

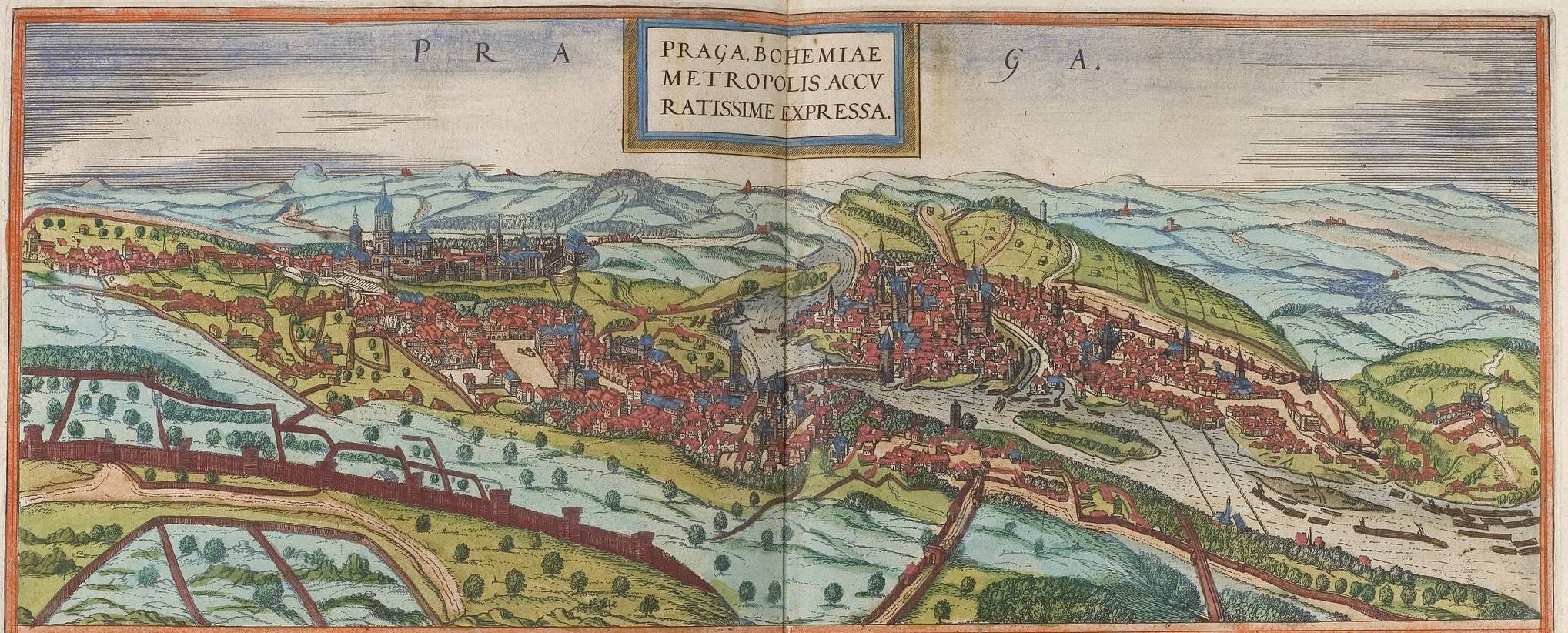
Prague in 1572

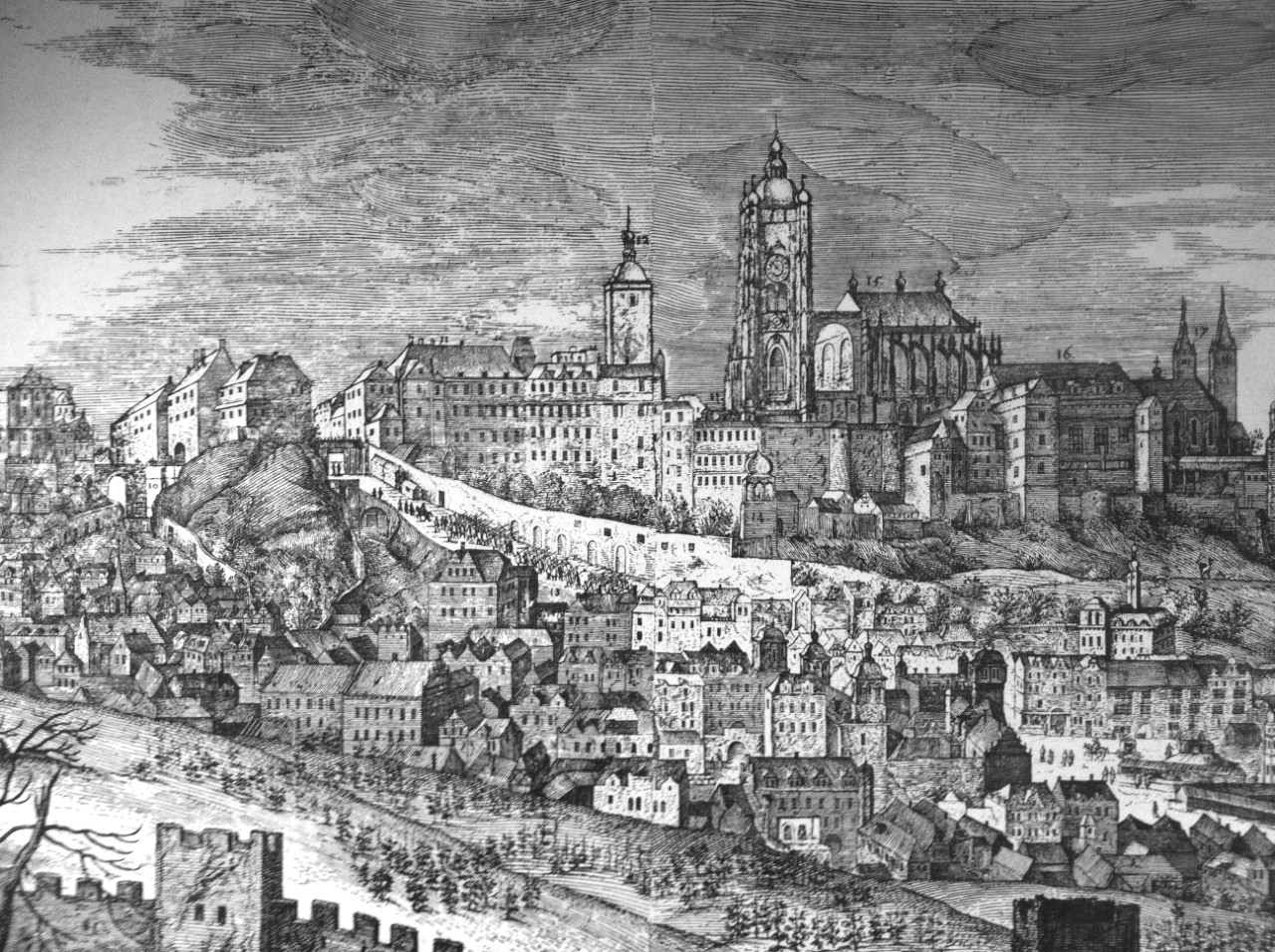
Prague Castle in 1606, by Aegidius Sadeler

Contemporary painting showing the Battle of White Mountain near Prague in 1620

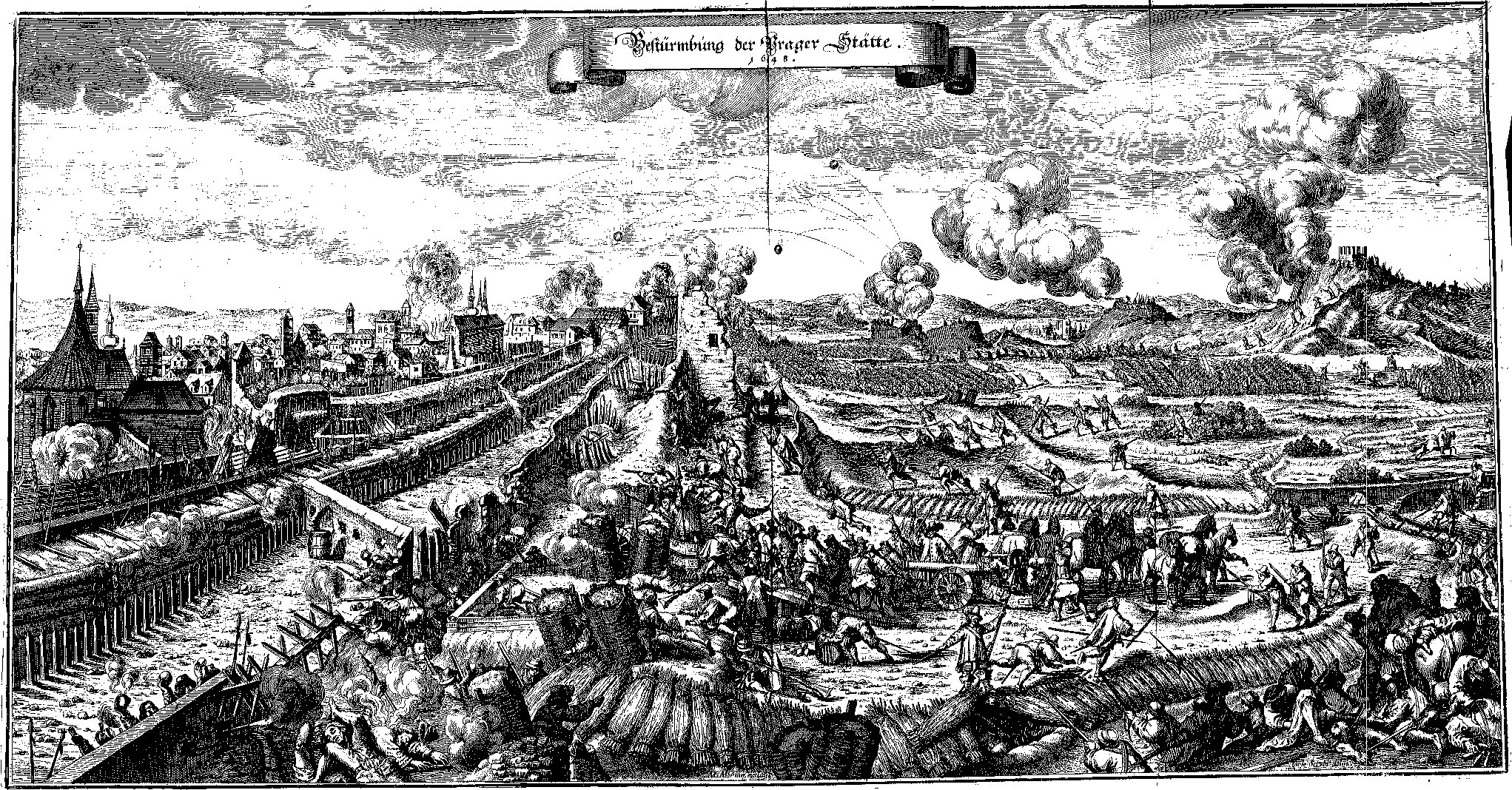
The final battle of the Thirty Years' War; Swedish siege of Prague in 1648

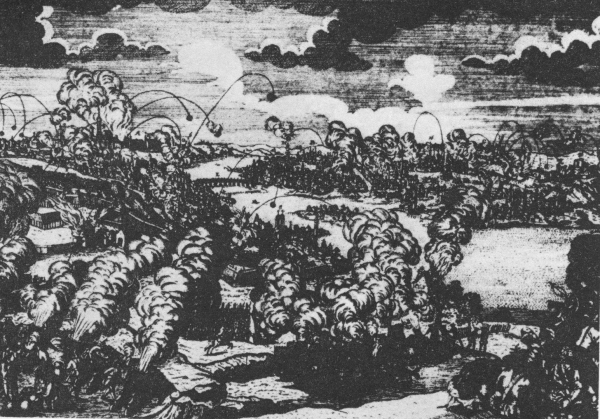
Prussian bombardment during the Siege of Prague in May–June 1757

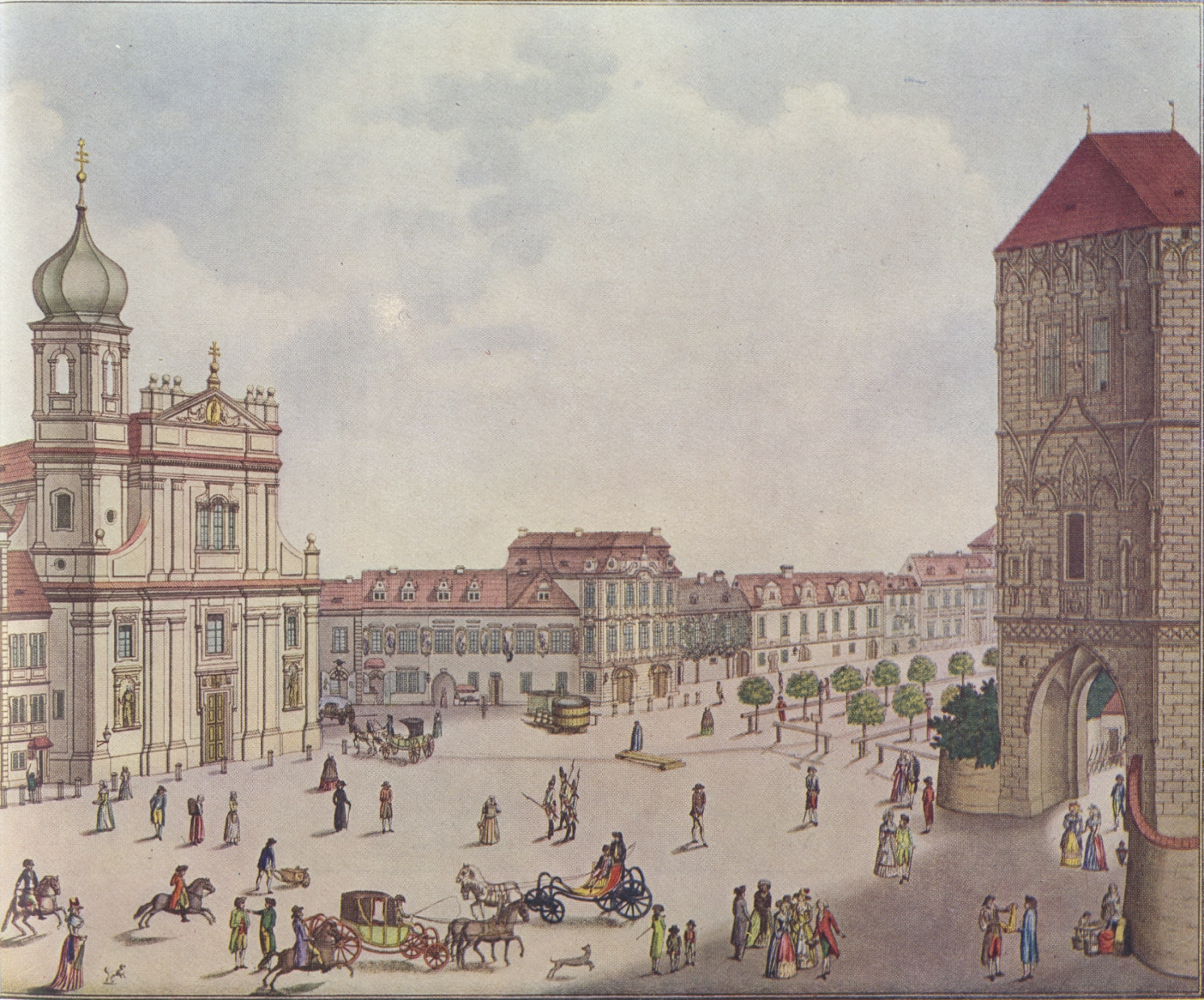
The intersection at the Powder Tower in 1792

Gallus Market (Havelské tržiště), 1888, by Vojtěch Bartoněk

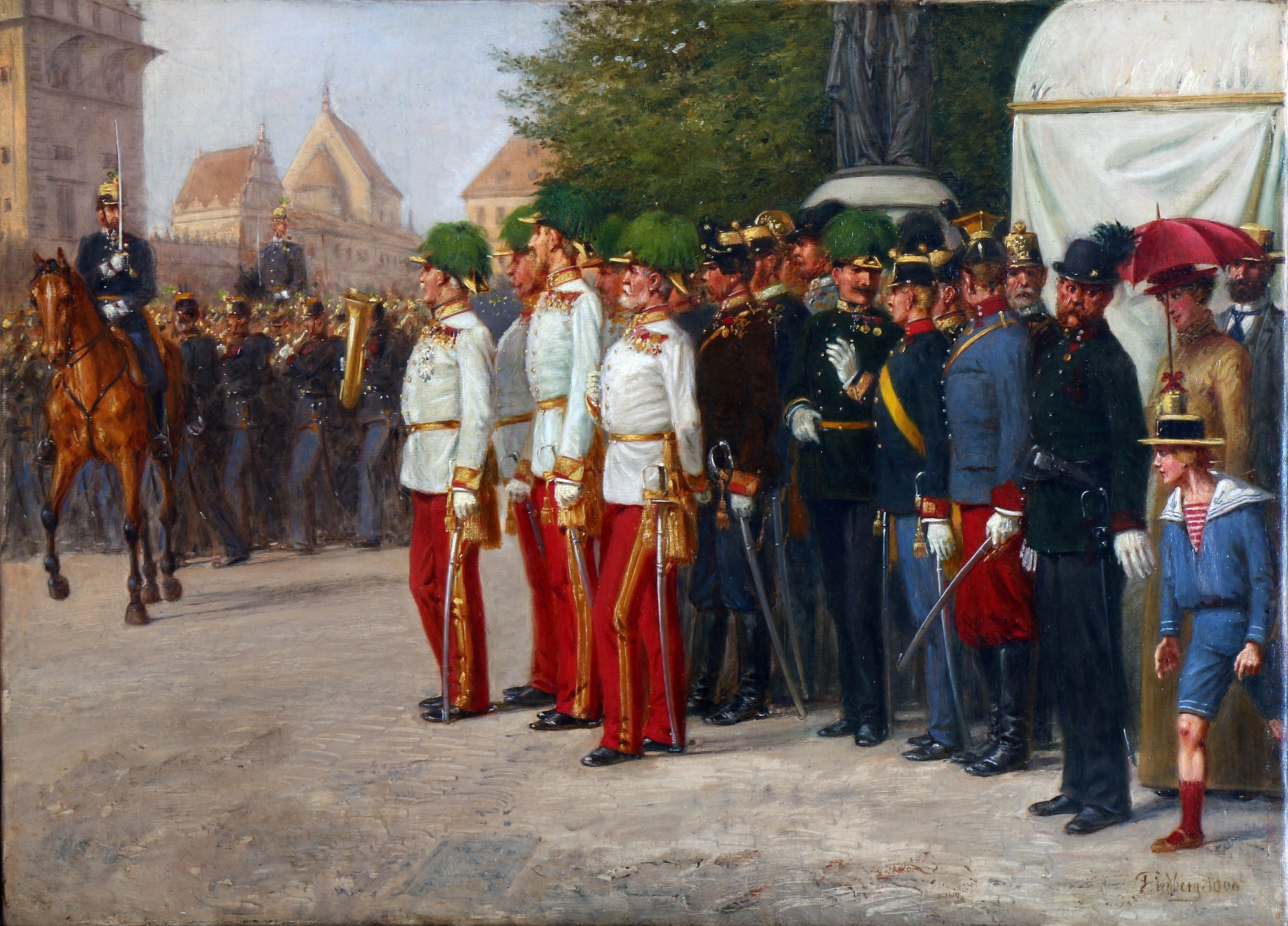
Austro-Hungarian military parade in Prague in 1900

Memorial plaques with the names of those executed at the Kobylisy Shooting Range

== Prehistory ==
The land where Prague came to be built has been settled since the Paleolithic Age. Several thousand years ago, trade routes connecting southern and northern Europe passed through this area, following the course of the river Vltava. From around 500 BC the Celtic tribe known as the Boii were the first inhabitants of this region known by name. The Boii gave their name to the region of Bohemia. The Marcomanni, a Germanic tribe, migrated to Bohemia with their king, Maroboduus, in AD 9. Meanwhile, some of the Celts migrated southward while the remainder assimilated with the Marcomanni. In 568, most of the Marcomanni migrated southward with the Lombards, another Germanic tribe. This was during the Migration period which extended from the 4th century to the beginning of the 10th century. The rest of the Marcomanni assimilated with the invading West Slavs. The Byzantine historian Prokopios mentions the presence of the Slavs in these lands in AD 512.

== Medieval Prague ==
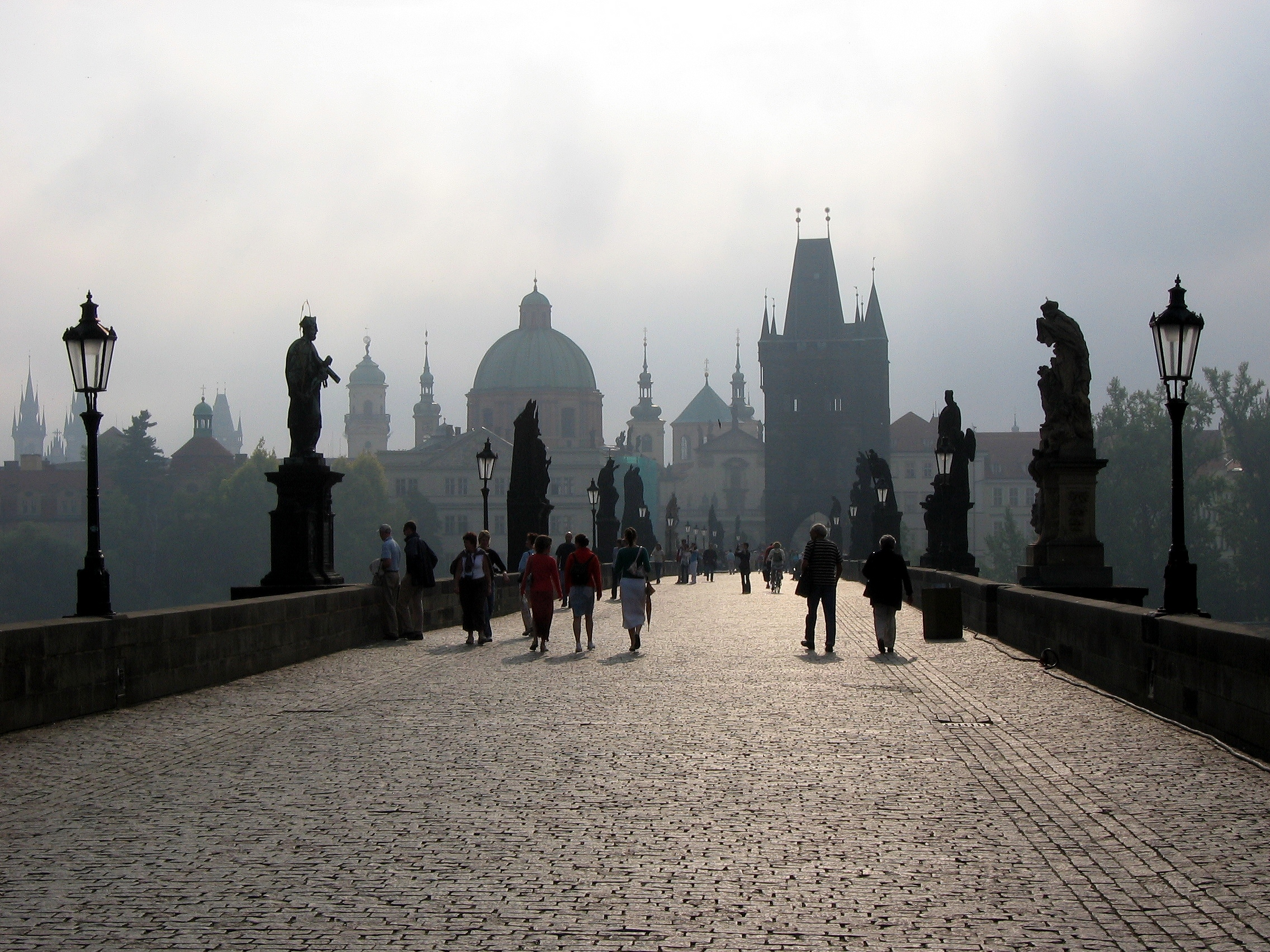
Charles Bridge

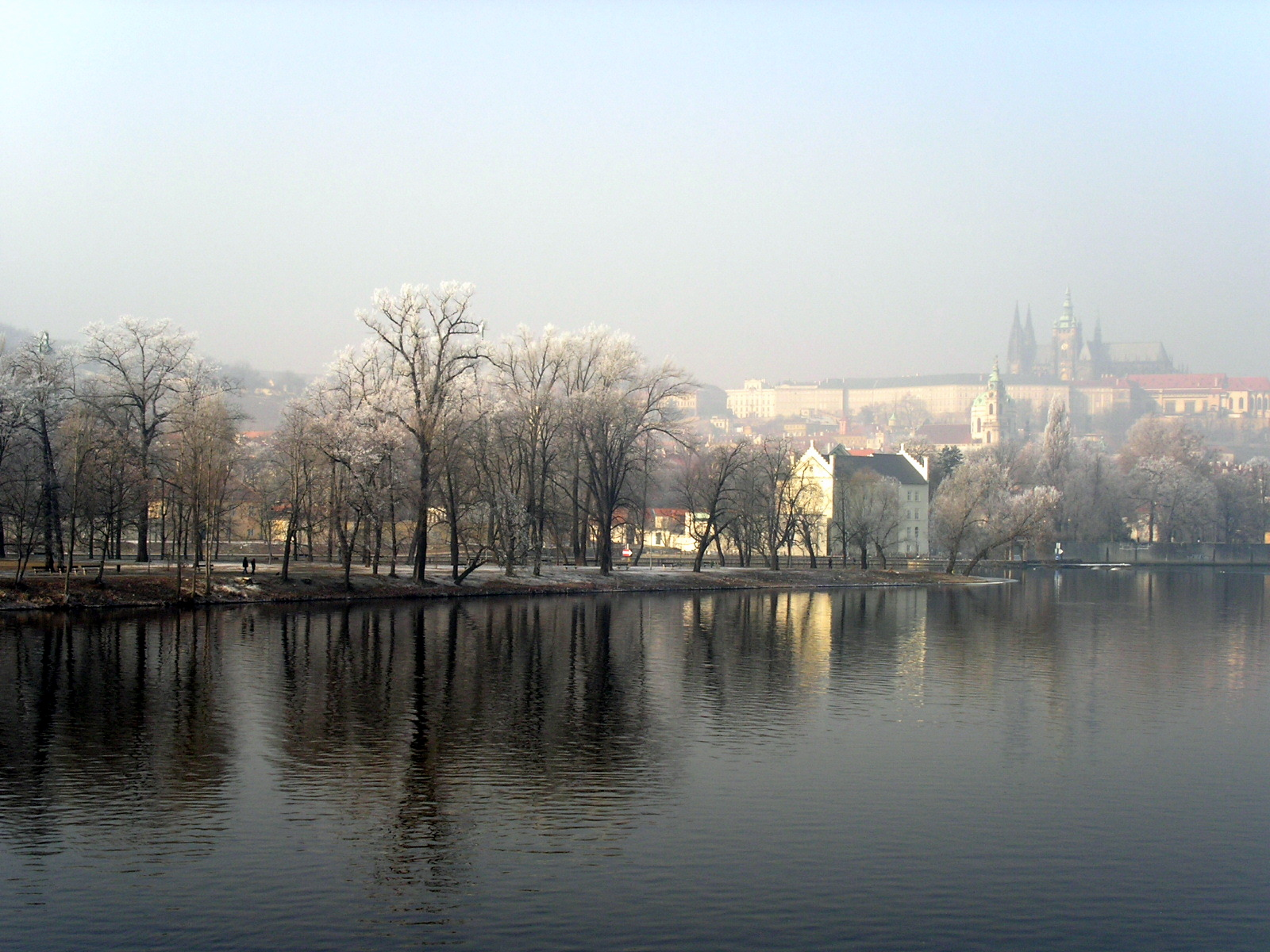
Vltava River

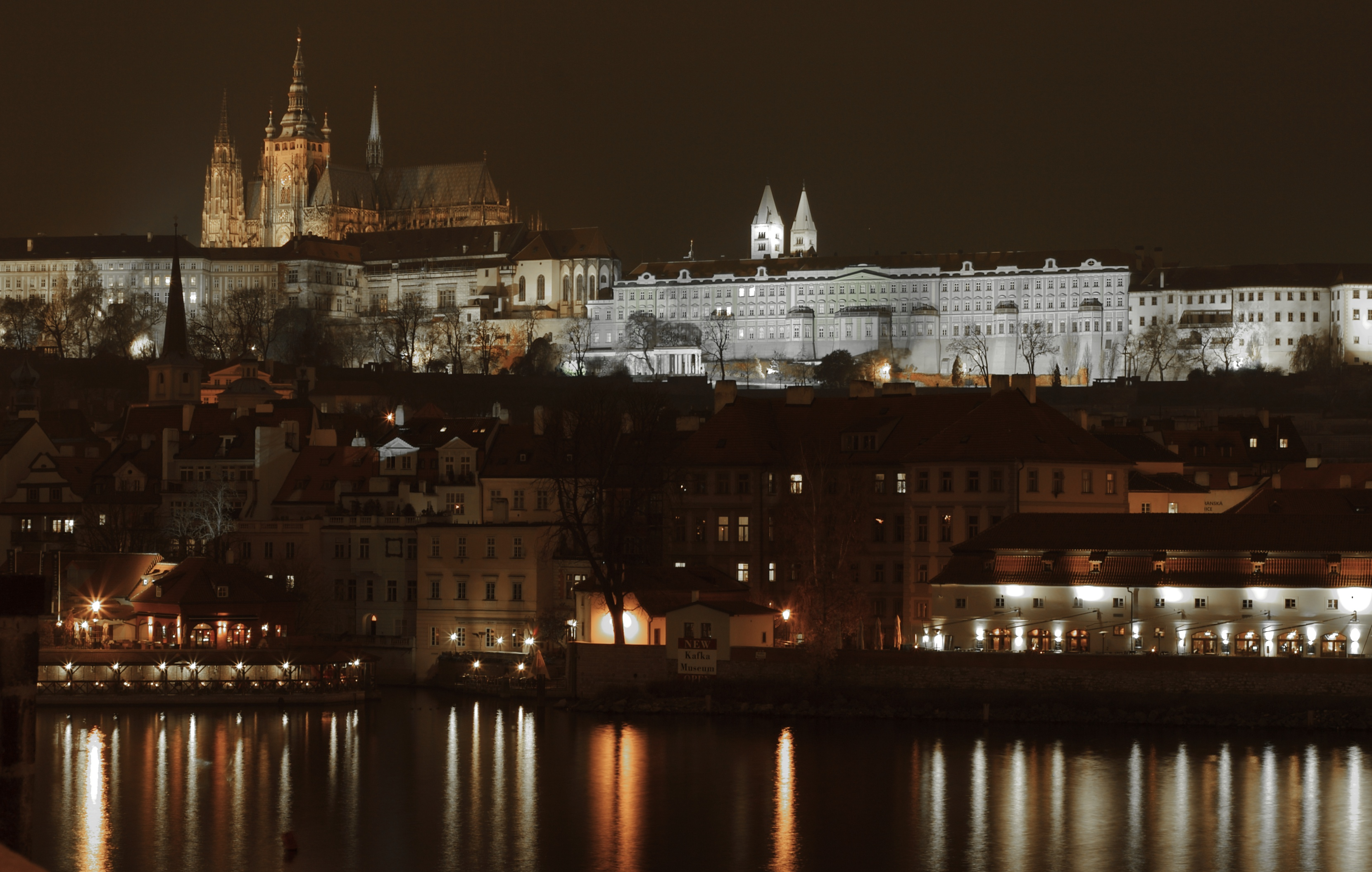
Prague Castle at night

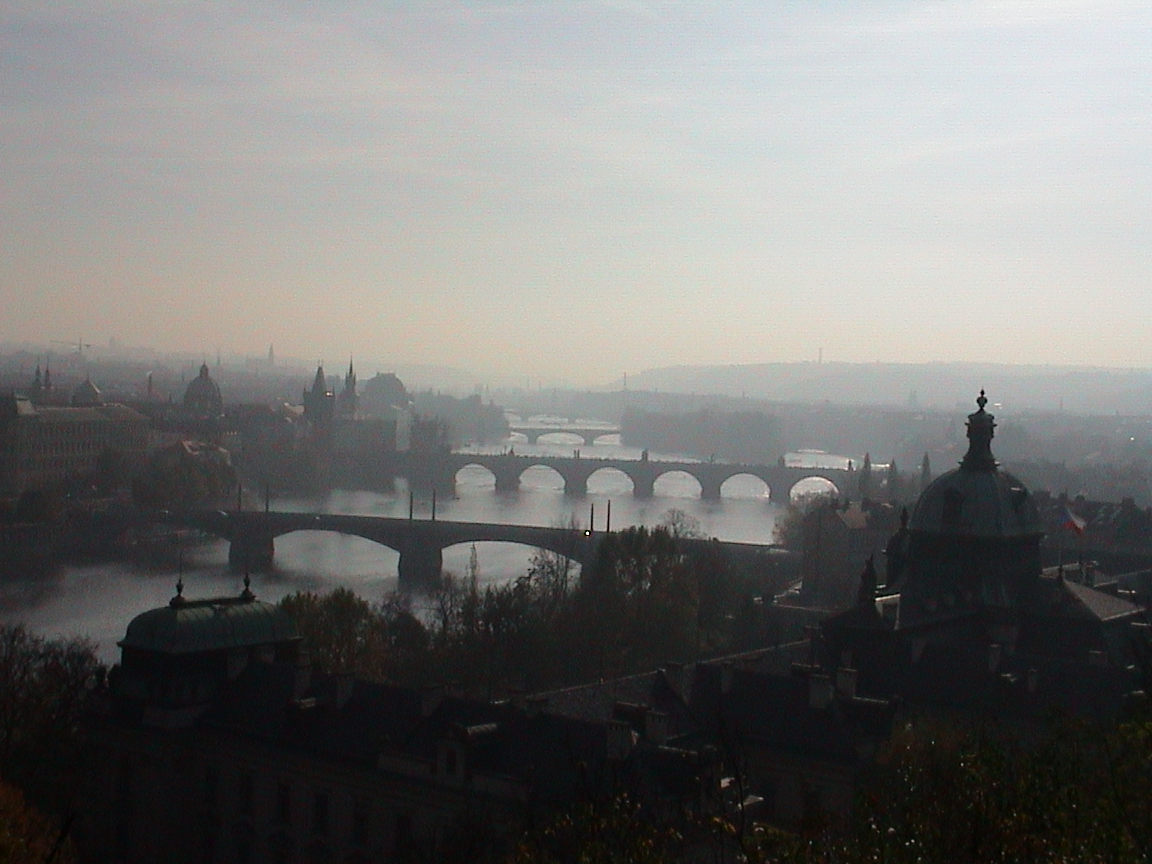
Bridges of Prague

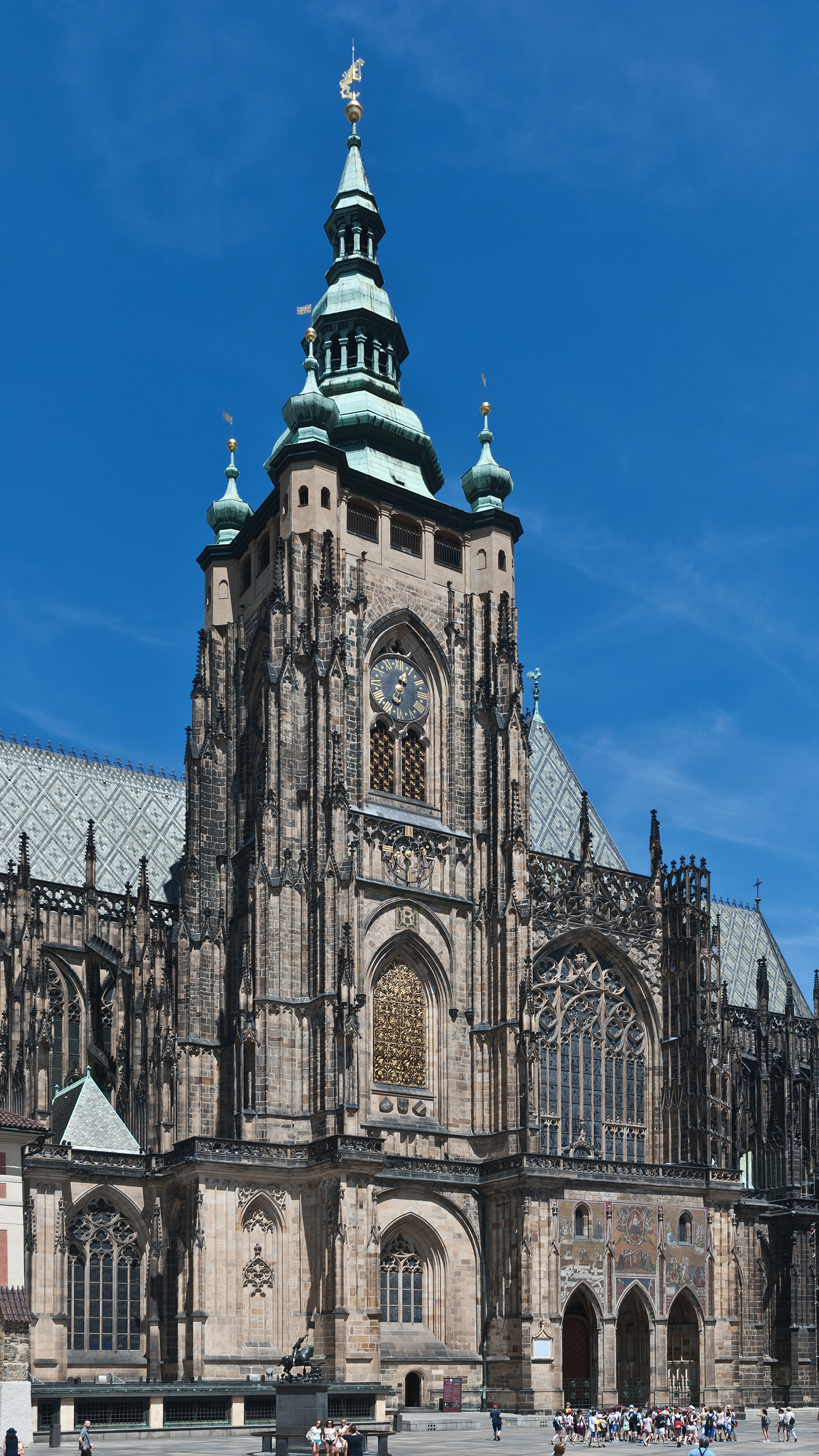
St. Vitus Cathedral

Old Town Square in Prague, Town Hall Tower and astronomical clock

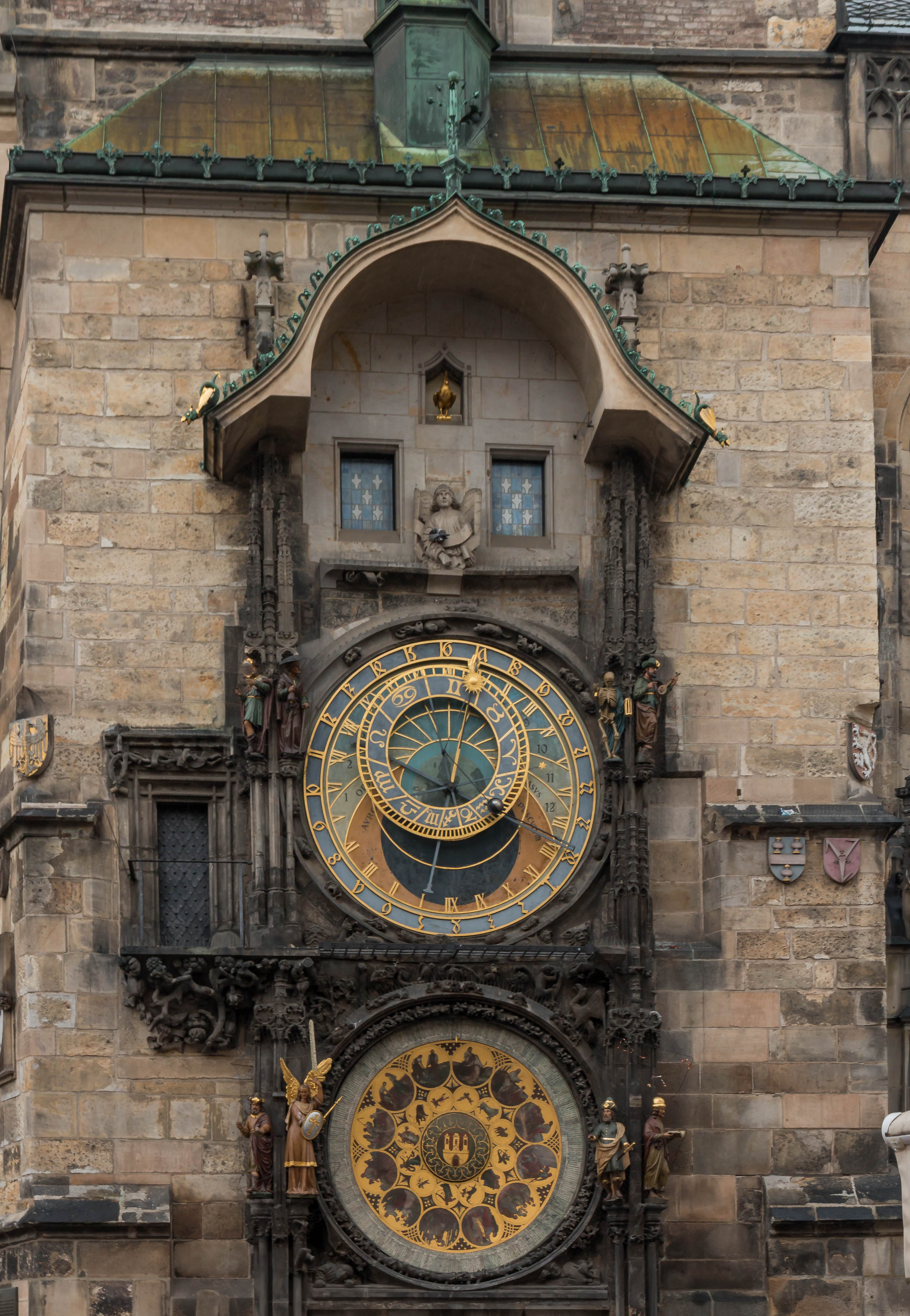
The astronomical clock

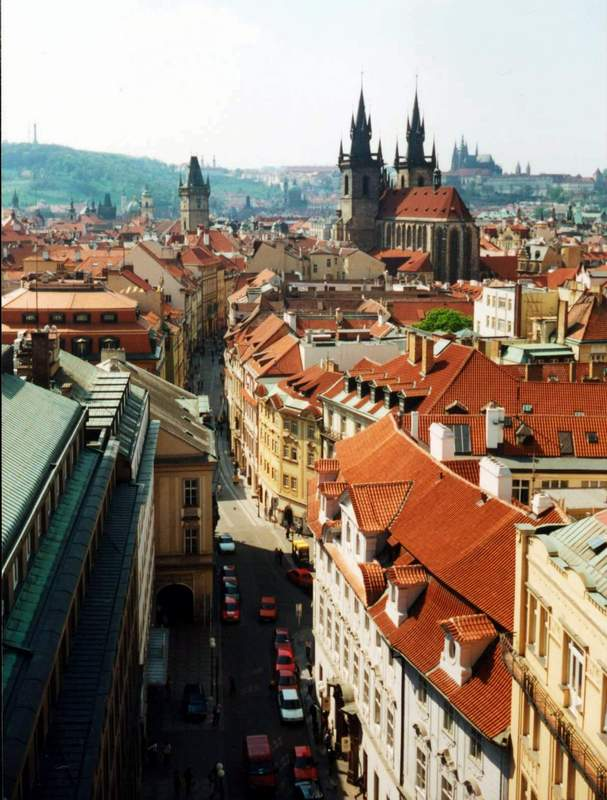
Týn Church – a view from east of Prague

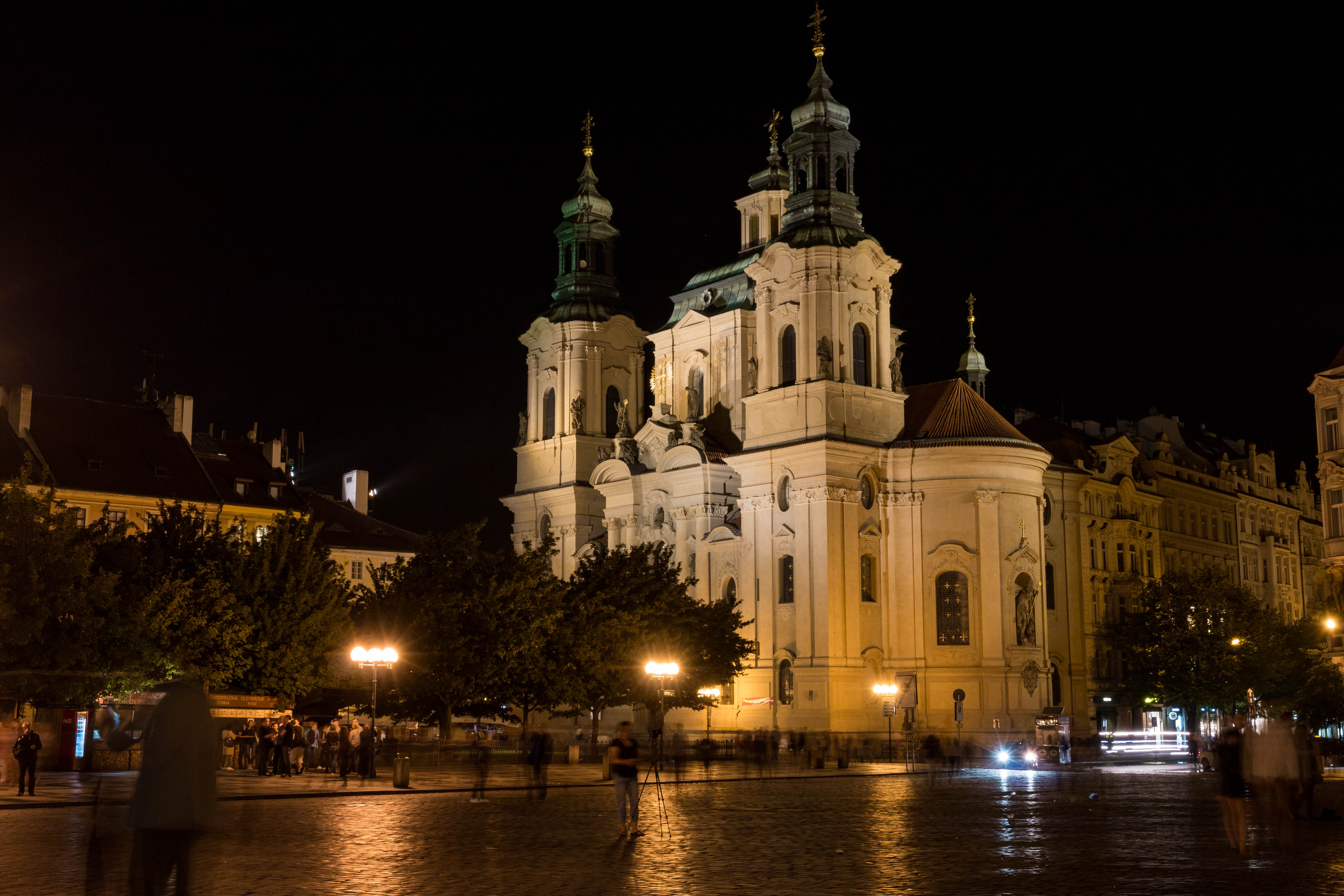
The Church of St. Nicolas

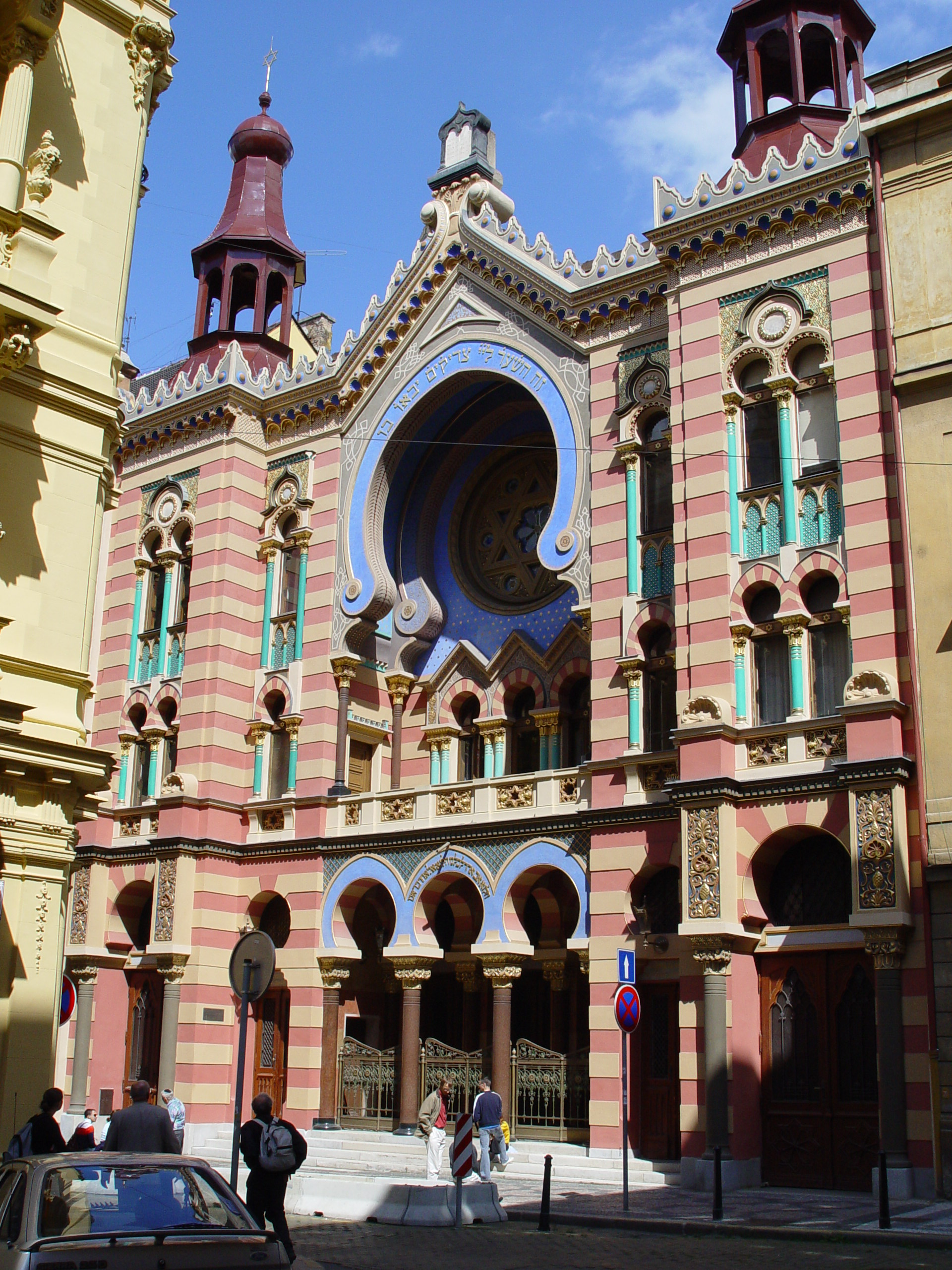
The Jerusalem Synagogue, built in 1905 to 1906 by Wilhelm Stiassny, of Bratislava, is the largest Jewish place of worship in Prague.

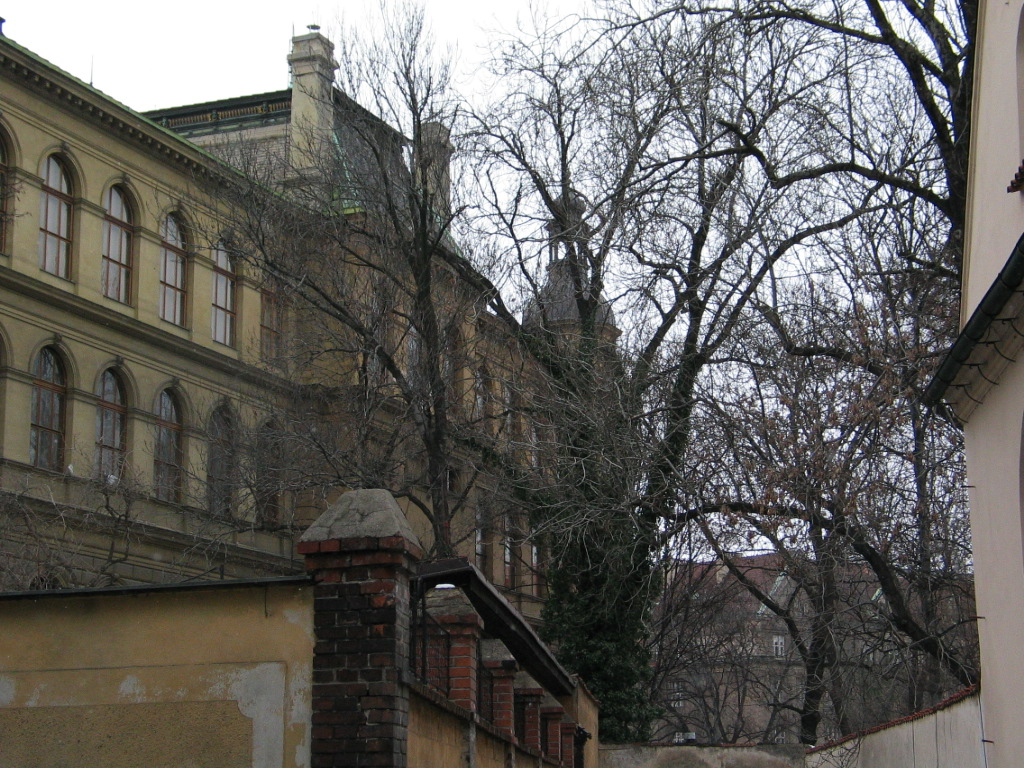
Jewish Cemetery and surrounding buildings

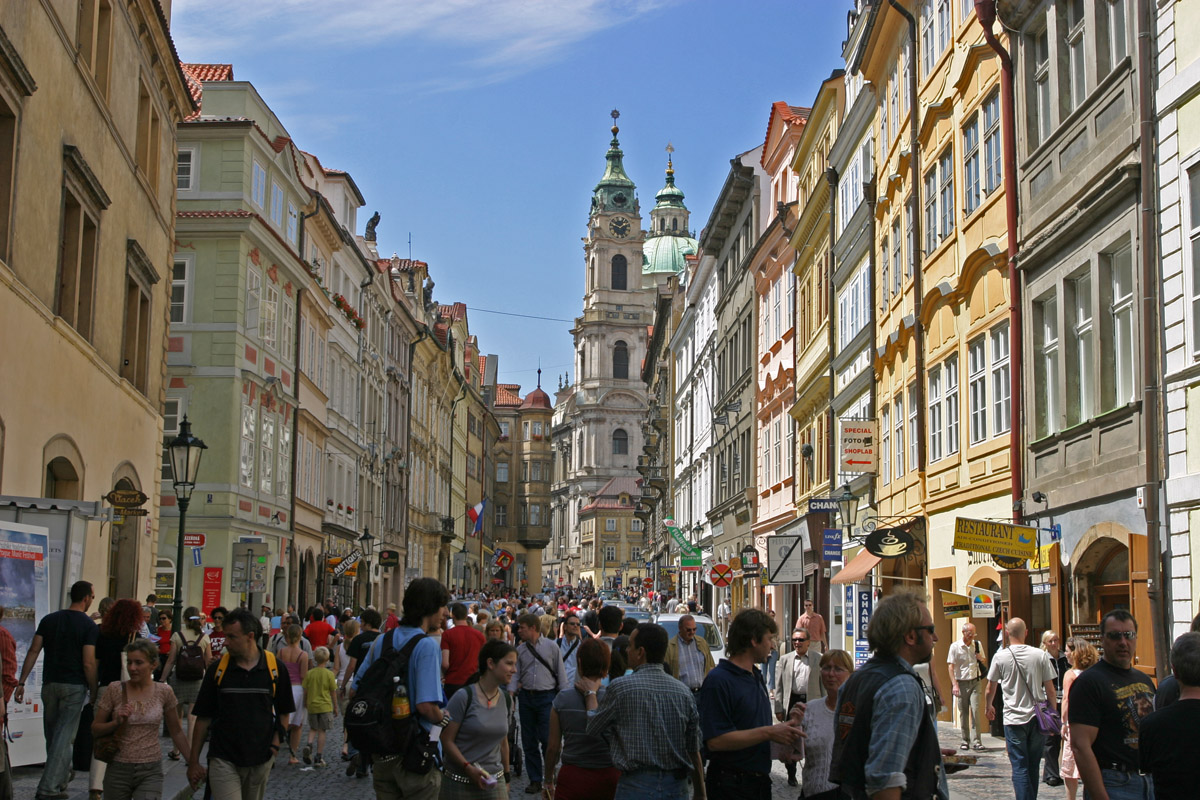
Packed with tourists on a busy summer day in Malá Strana (The Lesser Quarter), Prague

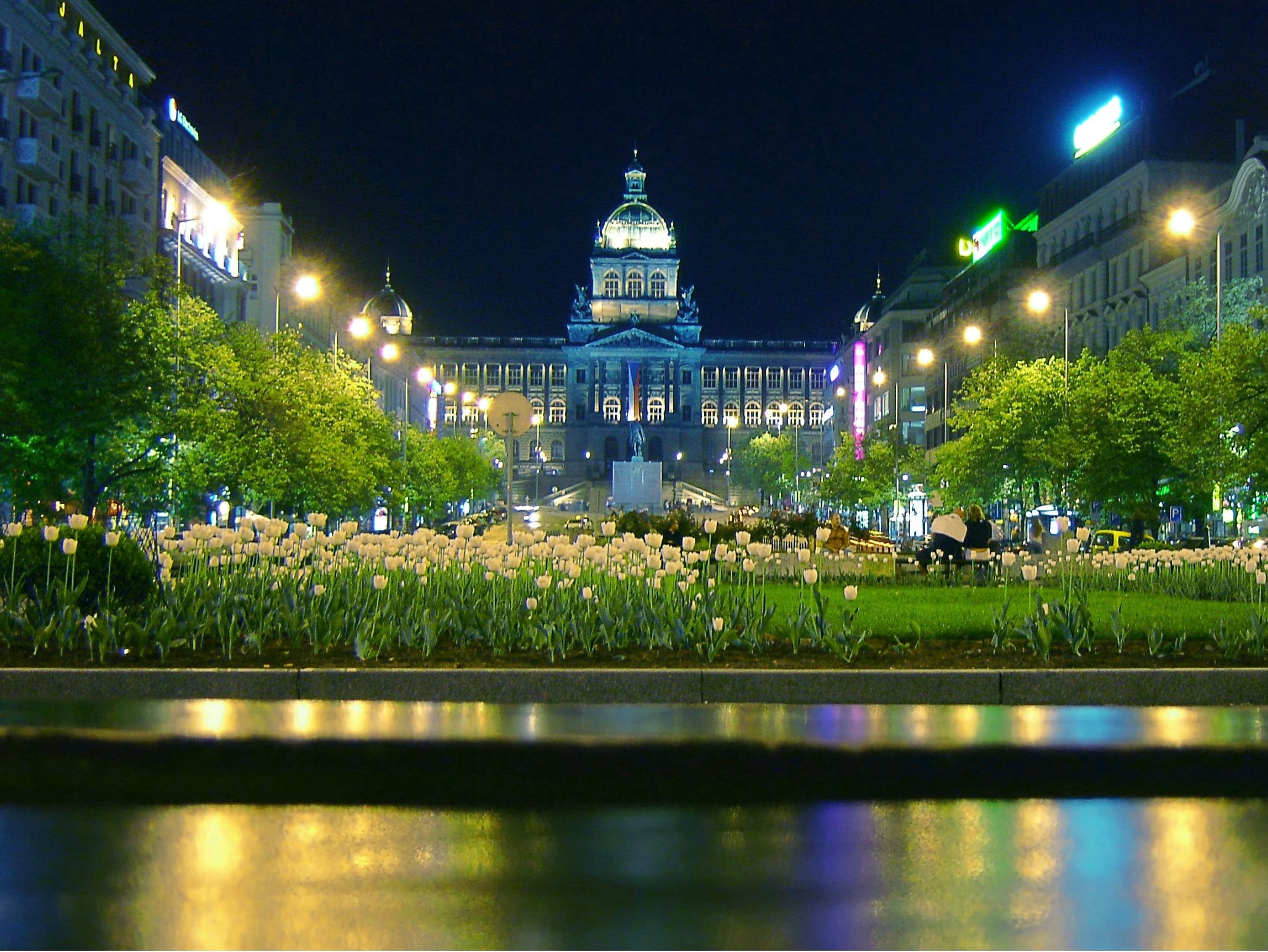
Wenceslas Square and National Museum at night

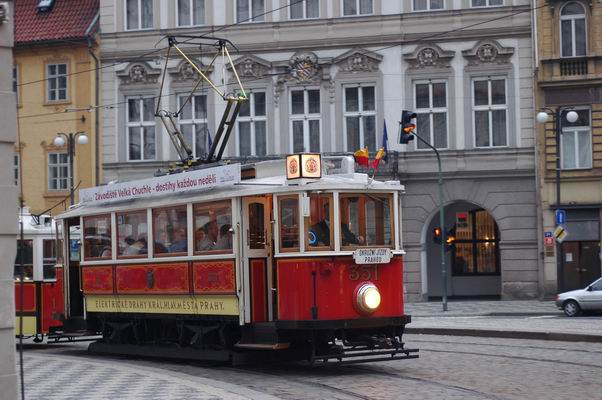
The "nostalgic tram" no. 91 runs through the city center.

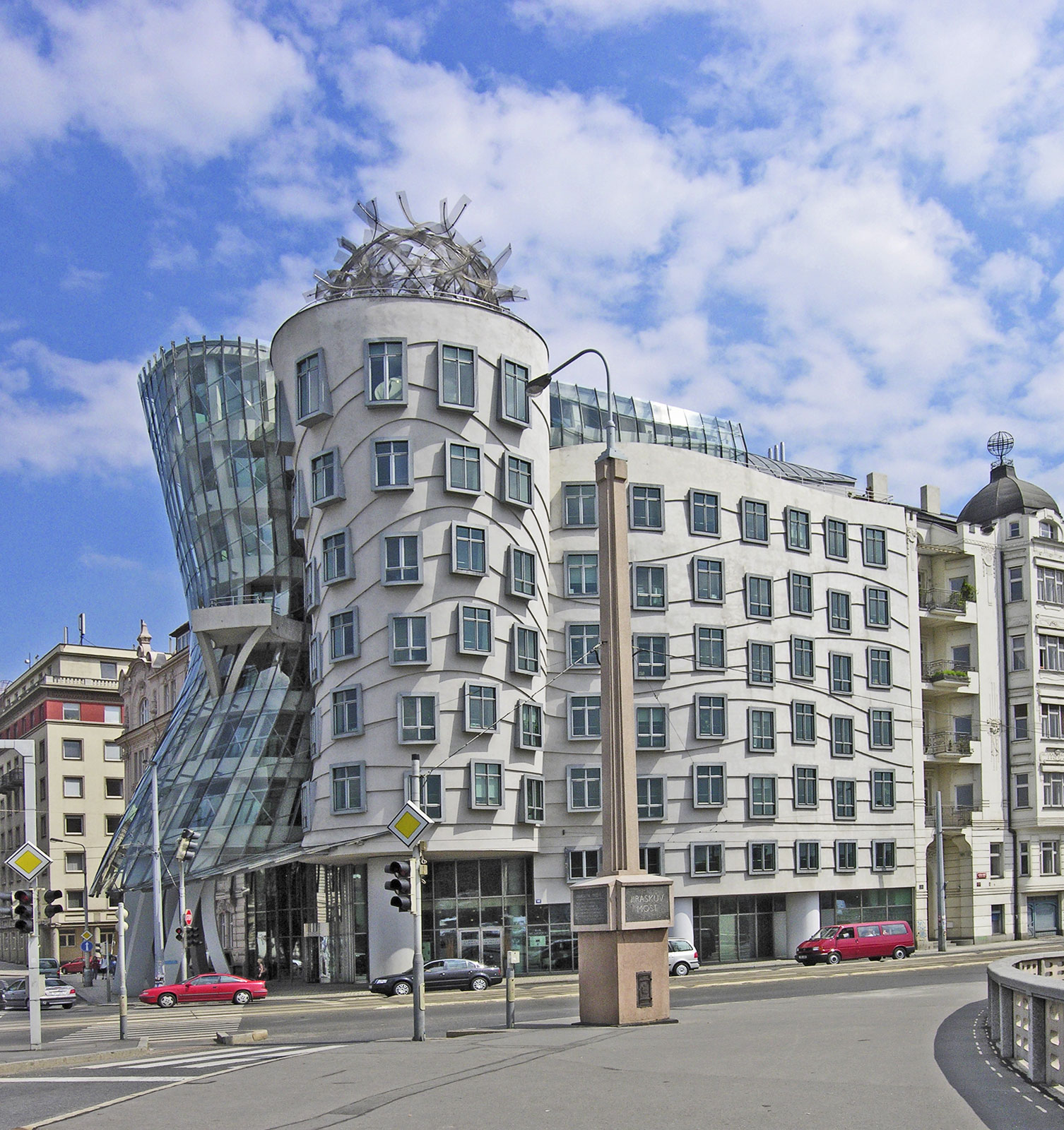
Milunić and Gehry's Dancing House

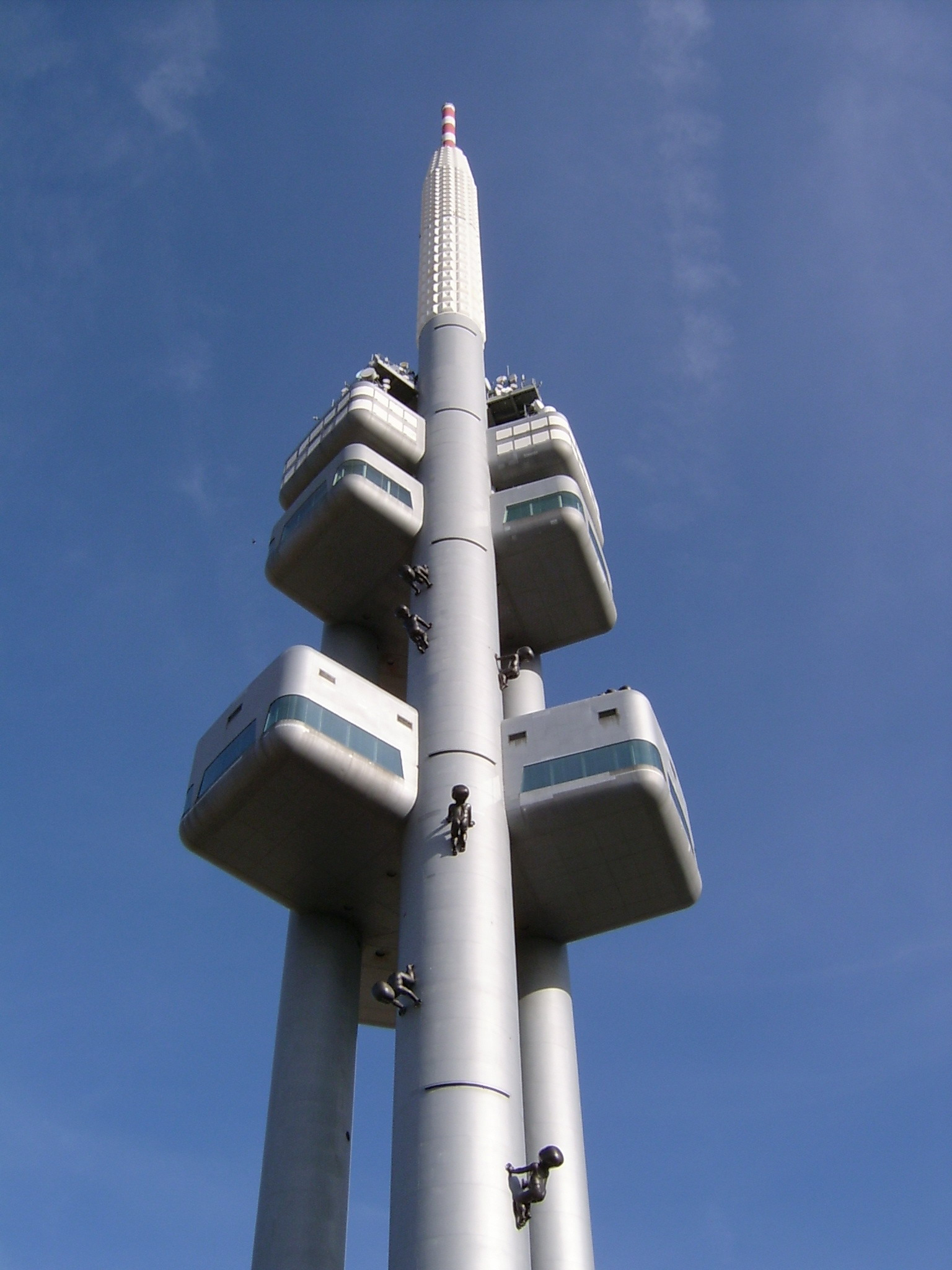
Prague TV tower with crawling "babies"

From around 900 until 1306, Czech Přemyslid dynasty rulers had most of Bohemia under their control. The first Bohemian ruler acknowledged by historians was the Czech Prince Bořivoj Přemyslovec, who ruled in the second half of the 9th century. He and his wife Ludmila (who became a patron saint of Bohemia after her death) were baptised by St Methodius (Metodej), who together with his brother St Cyril brought orthodox Christianity and a new alphabet called Glagolitic script to Moravia in 863. Bořivoj moved his seat from the fortified settlement Levý Hradec to a place called Prague (Praha). Prague Castle was initially built by Bořivoj around 880, and it is now one of the largest castles in the world. Since Bořivoj's reign the castle has been the seat of many Czech rulers, and today, it is the seat of the Czech president.

Bořivoj's grandson, Prince Wenceslas, initiated friendly relations with the Saxon dynasty. Wenceslas wanted Bohemia to become an equal partner in the larger empire, similar to how Bohemia was part of Samo's empire in the 7th century and Great Moravia in the 9th century). Orientation towards the Saxons was not favoured by his brother Boleslav, and it was the main reason why Wenceslas was assassinated on 28 September 935. He was buried in St. Vitus' Rotunda, the church which he founded; it stood on the ground where St Wenceslas' Chapel in the St Vitus Cathedral is now. A few years later, Wenceslas was canonized and became Bohemia's beloved patron saint; he is "Good King Wenceslas" from the Christmas carol. In 950, after long war, Boleslav was forced to accept the supremacy of Otto I the Great from the Saxon dynasty, who later became the Holy Roman Emperor. From 1041 onward (and perhaps as early as 1002), Bohemian dukes and kings were vassals of the Holy Roman Emperors and the Czech lands were appertained to the empire as autonomous territory.

By the early 10th century, the area around and below Prague Castle had developed into an important trading centre, where merchants from all over Europe gathered. In 965, Ibrahim ibn Ya'qub, an Arab merchant and traveler, wrote: "Prague is built from stone and lime, and it has the biggest trade centre. Slavs are on the whole courageous and brave... They occupy the lands which are the most fertile and abundant with a good food supply." The Duchy earned a significant income from the Prague slave trade, trafficking pagan Slavs, termed saqaliba, to slavery in al-Andalus in the 10th and 11th-centuries.

In 973, a bishopric was founded in Bohemia with the bishop's palace located on the Prague castle grounds. The first Czech bishop was Vojtěch (St Adalbert) from the Czech noble family of Slavník, who later evangelized Poles and Hungarians and became a patron saint to Czechs, Poles, and Hungarians after his canonization in 999.

In the 11th century, another Romanesque fortified settlement was established across the river from Prague at Vyšehrad. During the reign of Prince Vratislav II, who rose to the title of King of Bohemia in 1085 (as Vratislav I), Vyšehrad became the temporary seat of Czech rulers.

In 1158, Prince Vladislav II also rose to the title of King of Bohemia (as Vladislav I). Many monasteries and churches were built during his rule. In Prague, the Strahov Monastery, built in the Romanesque style, was founded in 1142. The first stone bridge over the river Vltava, the Judith Bridge, was built in 1170.

In 1212, Bohemia became a hereditary kingdom when Vladislav I's son, Prince Přemysl Otakar I, rose to the title of king by inheritance per Frederick II, Holy Roman Emperor from 1215, a political development that was legalised in the "Golden Bull of Sicily". The king's daughter, Agnes, became another Bohemian saint. Agnes preferred to enter a convent rather than marry Emperor Frederick II. During the reign of King Přemysl Otakar I, peaceful colonisation started as German colonists were invited to both Bohemia and Moravia. This immigration of Germans caused the Bohemian towns to increase in population, as did the institution of German town law. Three settlements around the Prague Castle gained the privilege of a town: across the river Vltava, the Old Town of Prague (Staré Město) gained the privilege of a town in 1230; the settlement below Prague Castle became the New Town of Prague in 1257 under King Otakar II - it was later renamed Malá Strana or the "Lesser Side" of Prague; and Hradčany, the "Castle District" built just outside Prague Castle, dates from 1320.

In the 13th century, King Přemysl Otakar II, known as the "Iron and Golden King", was the most powerful king in the Holy Roman Empire during his reign. He ruled in Bohemia, Moravia, Austria, Styria, Carniola, Carinthia, Egerland, and Friuli. His domain stretched from the Sudetes to the Adriatic Sea. Otakar II had hoped that the other six prince-electors would choose him as the King of Romans, but at the imperial election in 1273 the other electors thought that Otakar II was too risky and so they chose Rudolf I Habsburg as the emperor. Rudolf I was a weak ruler, which was the primary reason the electors chose him, as they would more easily keep the power and land that they acquired during the Great Interregnum (1250–73). Otakar II was outraged and so he refrained from attending Rudolf's coronation. When Rudolf requested that Otakar II be present at the imperial diet in Nuremberg, Otakar II refused. As a result Rudolf placed an imperial ban on him which caused him to lose all the territory he had acquired during the interregnum. Otakar II's plan was to challenge Rudolf and he assembled an army, but unfortunately he lost and died against Rudolf I in the Battle of Marchfeld on 26 August 1278. His son Wenceslaus II was still very young and would have to burden the great turmoil that has arisen in Bohemia.

The Přemyslid dynasty ruled until 1306 when the male line died out with the assassination of Wenceslaus III. The inheriting dynasty was the House of Luxembourg as emperor Henry VII, to prevent Henry of Carinthia from obtaining the Bohemian throne, offered it to his own son, John of Luxembourg, if he would marry Wenceslaus III's sister Elizabeth of Bohemia. Young John married Elizabeth on 7 September 1310 and headed to Prague to be crowned, but Henry of Carinthia had claimed the throne before he could arrive. John mustered a large army with the help of his father and when he arrived to Prague, Henry of Carinthia fled, allowing John to claim the Bohemian throne and be crowned on 7 February 1311.

== Renaissance ==
The city flourished during the 14th century during the reign of Charles IV of the Luxembourg dynasty. Charles was the eldest son of Czech Princess Elizabeth of Bohemia and John of Luxembourg. He was born in Prague on 14 May 1316 and became King of Bohemia upon the death of his father in 1346. Due to Charles' efforts, the bishopric of Prague was raised to an archbishopric in 1344 and the first archbishop was Arnošt z Pardubic, a close advisor to Charles. On 7 April 1348 Charles IV founded the University of Prague, the first university in central, northern, and eastern Europe, now known as Charles University (Univerzita Karlova). In the same year, using the inspiration of Paris, he also founded the New Town (Nové Město) of Prague immediately adjacent to the Old Town. Charles rebuilt Prague Castle and Vyšehrad, and in 1357 a new bridge over the Vltava, now known as the Charles Bridge, was erected to replace the Judith Bridge which had collapsed in 1342. Construction of the St Vitus' Cathedral had also begun and many other new churches were founded. In 1355, Charles was crowned Emperor of the Holy Roman Empire and Prague became the capital of the empire. Charles wanted Prague to become one of the most beautiful cities in the world and to make it a new center of art, science, and prestige. He also wanted Prague to be the dominant city of the whole empire, with Prague Castle as the dominant site in the city and the stately Gothic cathedral to be even more dominant than the castle. Everything was built in a grandiose Gothic style and decorated in an independent art style, called the Bohemian school. During the reign of Emperor Charles IV, the Czech lands were among the most powerful in Europe.

Unfortunately, all that changed during the reign of Charles IV's son, Wenceslas IV (Václav IV). During his reign (1378–1419), Master Jan Hus, a preacher and the university's rector, gave sermons in Prague in the Bethlehem Chapel, speaking in Czech in order to widely disseminate his ideas about the reformation of the church. Hus was accused of heresy and executed in Constance, Germany (Konstanz) in 1415. This led to the first Defenestration of Prague (1419), when the people rebelled under the command of Prague priest Jan Želivský and threw the city's councilors from the New Town Hall. This led to further violent dissent and the conflicts known as the Hussite Wars.

King Wenceslas IV died 16 days after the defenestration. His younger half-brother Sigismund (Zikmund) was now the legitimate heir to the throne. However the Hussites opposed Sigismund's coronation and so he came to Prague with an army of 30,000 crusaders. He planned to make Prague capitulate and take the crown. In 1420, peasant rebels and Hussite troops, led by general Jan Žižka, defeated Sigismund's army at the Battle of Vítkov Mountain. This was followed by more crusades, all of which ended in failure. But after Žižka died, the Hussites lost their focus and split into factions. The most radical Hussites were finally defeated at the Battle of Lipany in 1434 after the moderate Hussites sided with the Czech Catholics.

In 1458, the Utraquist Hussite nobleman George of Poděbrady was chosen as the Bohemian king by both the Catholics and the Utraquist Hussites. He was called "The King of Two Peoples" for his continual efforts to maintain peace between the Catholics and the Hussites. During his reign, however, Pope Paul II excommunicated George, declared him deposed as King of Bohemia, and called for a crusade against the Czech heretics. The crusade was led by the King of Hungary Matthias Corvinus who, after the crusade, also became the King of Bohemia (as supported by the Papacy). George, however, did not abdicate, and so Bohemia had two kings. George, before his death, made an arrangement with the Polish King Casimir IV that the next Bohemian king would come from the Jagiellon dynasty. This is because Elizabeth of Austria, the wife of Casimir IV, was the sister of former Bohemian king Ladislaus the Posthumous and thus her son Vladislaus was related to the Luxembourg dynasty and also to the original Bohemian Přemyslid dynasty. The Jagiellonian dynasty ruled only until 1526 when it died out with Ludwig Jagiellon, son of Vladislaus II Jagiellon.

The next Bohemian king was Ferdinand Habsburg, husband of Ann Jagiellon, the sister of Ludwig Jagiellon. This was the beginning of the Habsburg dynasty. After Ferdinand's brother Charles V resigned as Holy Roman Emperor in 1556, Ferdinand was elected Emperor two years later. After he died, his son Maximilian II inherited all of his titles, and then upon his death, his son Rudolf II inherited them in turn. The reign of Emperor Rudolf II (1576-1612) was another glorious time for Prague as it became the cultural centre of the Holy Roman Empire again. Rudolf was related to the Jagiellon dynasty, the Luxembourg dynasty, and the Přemyslid dynasty. However he was also related to the Spanish queen Joanna the Mad, the daughter of Queen Isabella I of Castile and King Ferdinand II of Aragon; Joanna was Rudolf's great-grandmother. Although Rudolf II was very talented, he was eccentric and he suffered from depression. Emperor Rudolf II lived in Prague Castle, where he held his bizarre courts of astrologers, magicians, and other strange figures. But it was a prosperous period for the city of Prague; famous people living there included the astronomers Tycho Brahe and Johannes Kepler, the painters Giuseppe Arcimboldo, Bartholomeus Spranger, Hans von Aachen, and Joseph Heintz the Elder. In 1609, under the influence of the Protestant Estates, Rudolf II (a devout Catholic), issued an "Imperial Charter of the Emperor" in which he legalised extensive religious freedoms unparalleled in the Europe of that period. Many German Protestants (both Lutherans and Calvinists) immigrated to Bohemia.

Next in line for Bohemian crown was Rudolf's brother Matthias, but since Matthias was childless, his cousin, the archduke Ferdinand of Styria (also related to Jagiellon, Luxembourg, and Přemyslid Dynasties) was initially accepted by the Bohemian Diet as heir presumptive when Matthias became ill. The Protestant Estates of Bohemia did not like this decision, however, as Ferdinand was not as amenable to the dual religious nature of the kingdom as his cousins were. Tension between the Protestants and the pro-Habsburg Catholics led to the Third Defenestration of Prague, when the Catholic governors were thrown from the windows of Prague Castle on 23 May 1618. They survived, but the Protestants replaced the Catholic governors. This incident led to the Thirty Years' War.

When Matthias died, Ferdinand was elected as Holy Roman Emperor Ferdinand II, but he was not accepted as King of Bohemia by the Protestant directors. Instead the Calvinist Frederick V of the Palatinate was elected King of Bohemia in 1619. Frederick was chosen because he was a leader of the Protestant Union, a military alliance founded by his father, and it was hoped that he had the support of his father-in-law, James VI of Scotland and I of England. However, Frederick's allies in the Protestant Union failed to support him militarily by pledging neutrality in the Treaty of Ulm, and James opposed his son-in-law's takeover of Bohemia from the Habsburgs. The Battle of White Mountain (Bílá Hora) followed on 8 November 1620; it was essentially a battle between Catholics and Protestants. Emperor Ferdinand II was helped not only by Catholic Spain, Poland, and Bavaria, but also by Lutheran Saxony (which disliked the Calvinists). The Protestant army, led by the warrior Count Jindřich Matyáš Thurn, was formed mostly from Lutheran Silesia, Lusatia, and Moravia. The Catholics won, Frederick fled, and Emperor Ferdinand II became King of Bohemia and proclaimed the re-Catholicisation of the Czech lands. Twenty-seven Protestant leaders were executed in Prague's Old Town Square on 21 June 1621: 3 noblemen, 7 knights, and 17 burghers, including Dr. Jan Jesenius, the Rector of Prague University. Most of the Protestant leaders were exiled or fled from Prague, including Count Thurn. Under Ferdinand II's rule, no faith other than Catholicism was permitted, the upper classes had the option to either convert to Catholicism or emigrate, Protestants had to return all seized Catholic property to the Church, and the German language was given equal status with the Czech language. After the Peace of Westphalia, Ferdinand II moved the court of the empire to Vienna, and Prague began a steady decline which reduced the population to 20,000 from the 60,000 it had had before the war.

== Jewish quarter ==
The 17th century is considered the Golden Age of Jewish Prague. The Jewish community of Prague numbered some 15,000 people (approximately 30% of the entire population), making it the largest Ashkenazic community in the world and the second largest Jewish community in Europe after Thessaloniki. From 1597 to 1609, the Maharal (Judah Loew ben Bezalel) served as Prague's chief rabbi. He is considered the greatest Jewish scholar in Prague's history, and his tomb in the Old Jewish Cemetery is a pilgrimage site.

The expulsion of Jews from Prague by Maria Theresa of Austria in 1745 based on their alleged collaboration with the Prussian army was a severe blow to the flourishing Jewish community. The Queen allowed the Jews to return to the city in 1748. In 1848 the gates of the Prague ghetto were opened. The former Jewish quarter, renamed Josefov and officially incorporated into the city in 1850, was demolished during the "ghetto clearance" (Czech: asanace) around the start of the 20th century.

== 18th century ==
In 1689 a great fire devastated Prague, but this spurred a renovation and a rebuilding of the city. The economic rise continued through the following century, and in 1771 the city had 80,000 inhabitants. Many of these were rich merchants who, together with noblemen, enriched the city with a host of palaces, churches, and gardens, creating a Baroque style renowned throughout the world. In 1784, under Joseph II, the four municipalities of Hradčany, Malá Strana, Staré Město, and Nové Město were merged into a single entity. The Industrial Revolution had a strong effect in Prague, as factories could take advantage of the coal mines and ironworks in the nearby regions.

== 19th century ==
In 1806, the Holy Roman Empire ended when Napoleon dictated its dissolution. Holy Roman Emperor Francis II abdicated his title. He became Francis I, Emperor of Austria.

At the same time as the Industrial Revolution was developing, the Czechs were also going through the Czech National Revival movement: political and cultural changes demanded greater autonomy. Since the late 18th century, Czech literature occupied an important position in the Czech culture.

A first suburb, Karlín, was created in 1817, and twenty years later the population exceeded 100,000. The first railway connection was built in 1842.

The revolutions that shocked all of Europe around 1848 touched Prague too, but they were fiercely suppressed. In the following years the Czech nationalist movement (opposed to another nationalist party, the German one) began its rise, until it gained the majority in the Town Council in 1861.

In 1867, Emperor Francis Joseph I established the Austro-Hungarian Dual Monarchy of the Austrian Empire and Kingdom of Hungary.

== 20th century ==
The next in succession to the Austro-Hungarian throne was Francis Ferdinand d'Este after Crown Prince Rudolf (son of the emperor Francis Joseph I) had committed suicide and after the Emperor's brother (Ferdinand's father) had died. Ferdinand (related also to Jagellon, Luxemburg and Premyslovec Dynasties) was married to Sophie von Chotek from a Czech aristocratic family. They lived in Bohemia at the Konopiste Castle, not far from Prague. He was in favour of a Triple Monarchy, expanding an Austro-Hungary Dualism into Austro-Hungary-Czech Triple Monarchy, but on 28 June 1914 he and his wife were assassinated in Sarajevo. This assassination led to World War I.

World War I ended with the defeat of the Austro-Hungarian Empire and, with the help of Tomáš Garrigue Masaryk who was going around the world trying to find political support, the creation of Czechoslovakia. Apart from just having Czechia and Slovakia during the war in 1919 in Austry-Hungary Czechoslovakia was granted Carpathian Ruthenia. Prague was chosen as its capital. At this time Prague was a European city with developed industrial background. In 1930 the population had risen to 850,000.

For most of its history Prague had been an ethnically mixed city with important Czech, German, and Jewish populations. Prague had German-speaking near-majority in 1848, but by 1880 the German population decreased to 13.52 percent, and by 1910 to 5.97 percent, due to a massive increase of the city's overall population caused by the influx of Czechs from the rest of Bohemia and Moravia and also due to the assimilation of some Germans. As a result, the German minority along with the German-speaking Jewish community remained mainly in the central, ancient parts of city, while the Czechs had a near-absolute majority in the fast-growing suburbs of Prague. As late as 1880, Germans speakers still formed 22 percent of the population of Stare Mesto (the Old Town), 16 percent in Nove Mesto (the New Town), 20 percent in Mala strana (the Little Quarter), 9 percent in Hradcany, and 39 percent in the former Jewish Ghetto of Josefov.

When Czechoslovakia gained independence, the Prague Germans experienced discrimination. Prague Mayor Karel Baxa banned the posting of notices in German and the inscription of burial urns in German.

As in Germany and Austria nationalistic and fascist movements gained ground in the first half of the 20th. century, Prague German underwent a revival as German speaking emigrants settled in the town. Famous German speaking writers such as Max Brod, Egon Erwin Kisch, Joseph Roth, Alfred Döblin, Egon Friedell, Franz Kafka, and Leo Perutz wrote for the liberal German language newspaper Prager Tagblatt.

From 1939, when the country was occupied by Nazi Germany, and during World War II, most Jews either fled the city or were killed in the Holocaust. Most of the Jews living in Prague after the war emigrated during the years of Communism, particularly after the communist coup, the establishment of Israel in 1948, and the Soviet invasion in 1968. In the early 1990s, the Jewish Community in Prague numbered only 800 people compared to nearly 50,000 before World War II. In 2006, some 1,600 people were registered in the Jewish Community.

During the Nazi German occupation of Czechoslovakia Prague citizens were oppressed and persecuted by the Nazis. Politicians (e.g. prime minister Alois Eliáš), university professors and students and many others were murdered, imprisoned or sent to concentration camps. Prague was a target of several allied bombings, the deadliest one occurring on 14 February 1945, when large parts of the city centre were destroyed, leaving over 700 people dead and nearly 1200 injured. The Prague uprising started on 5 May 1945 when Prague's Czech citizens, assisted by the defecting 1st Infantry Division of the Russian Liberation Army, revolted against the Nazi German occupiers. That same day, General Patton's American Third Army (with 150,000 soldiers) arrived in Pilsen (only a few hours away from Prague) while Marshal Konev's Soviet Army was on the borders of Moravia. General Patton was in favour of liberating Prague, but he had to comply with the instructions from General D. Eisenhower. General Eisenhower requested the Soviet Chief of Staff to permit them to press forward, but was informed that American help was not needed (a prior agreement from the Yalta Conference was that Bohemia would be liberated by the Red Army). Finally, on 9 May 1945 (the day after Germany officially capitulated) Soviet tanks reached Prague. It was not until 12 May 1945 that all fighting ceased in the Czech Lands. German occupation caused the death of 77,297 Czechoslovak Jews, whose names are inscribed on walls of the Pinkas Synagogue in Prague.

The German army left Prague in the morning of 8 May. German-speaking Prague citizens were gathered brutally and expelled from their home city, similar to the expulsions carried out all over Czechoslovakia and Eastern Europe. During this, a number of local massacres occurred resulting in an unknown number of fatalities.

After the war, Prague again became the capital of Czechoslovakia, now without significant Germans and Jews left in the city. Many Czechs genuinely felt gratitude towards the Soviet soldiers. Soviet troops left Czechoslovakia a couple of months after the war but the country remained under strong Soviet political influence. In February 1948, Prague became the centre of a communist coup.

The intellectual community of Prague, however, suffered under the totalitarian regime, in spite of the rather careful programme of rebuilding and caring for the damaged monuments after World War II. At the 4th Czechoslovak Writers' Congress held in the city in 1967 a strong position against the regime was taken. This spurred the new secretary of the Communist Party, Alexander Dubček to proclaim a new phase in the city's and country's life, beginning the short-lived season of "socialism with a human face". This was the Prague Spring, which aimed at a democratic reform of institutions. The Soviet Union and the rest of the Warsaw Pact, except for Romania, reacted, occupying Czechoslovakia and the capital in August 1968, suppressing any attempt at innovation under the treads of their tanks.

During the communist period little was actively done to maintain the beauty of the city's buildings. Due to the poor incentives offered by the regime, workers would put up scaffolding and then disappear to moonlighting jobs. Vaclavske Namesti (Wenceslas Square) was covered in such scaffolds for over a decade, with little repair ever being accomplished. True renovation began after the collapse of communism. The durability of renovations was aided by the fact that Prague converted almost entirely from coal heating in homes to electric heating. The coal burnt during the communist period was a major source of air pollution that corroded and spotted building façades, giving Prague the look of a dark, dirty city.

In 1989, after the Berlin Wall had fallen, and the Velvet Revolution crowded the streets of Prague, Czechoslovakia freed itself from communism and Soviet influence, and Prague benefited deeply from the new mood. In 1993, after the split of Czechoslovakia, Prague became the capital city of the new Czech Republic. Prague is capital of two administrative units of Czech Republic – Prague region (Czech: hlavní město Praha) and Central Bohemian Region (Czech: Středočeský kraj). As Prague is not geographically part of Central Bohemian Region it is a capital outside of the territory it serves.

== Timeline of important moments in Prague history ==
The four independent boroughs that had formerly constituted Prague were eventually proclaimed a single city in 1784. Those four cities were Hradčany (the Castle District, west and north of the Castle), Little Quarter (Malá Strana, south of the Castle), Old Town (Staré Město, on the east bank opposite the Castle) and New Town (Nové Město, further south and east). The city underwent further expansion with the annexation of Josefov in 1850 and Vyšehrad in 1883, and at the beginning of 1922, another 37 municipalities were incorporated, raising the city's population to 676,000. In 1938 population reached 1,000,000.

== Historical population ==
Historical population

Year	Pop.	±%
1230	4,000	—
1370	40,000	+900.0%
1600	60,000	+50.0%
1804	90,000	+50.0%
1837	105,500	+17.2%
1850	118,000	+11.8%
1880	162,000	+37.3%

Year	Pop.	±%
1900	201,600	+24.4%
1925	718,300	+256.3%
1950	931,500	+29.7%
1980	1,182,800	+27.0%
1991	1,214,174	+2.7%
2000	1,204,897	−0.8%

- The record of 1230 includes Staré Město only.
- The records of 1370 and 1600 includes Staré město, Nové město, Malá Strana and Hradčany quarters.
- Numbers beside other years denote the population of Prague within the administrative border of the city at that time.

== See also ==
- History of the Czech Lands
- Famous people connected with Prague
- List of rulers of Bohemia
- Churches in Prague

== Bibliography ==
Chittom, Lynn-nore. "Prague, Czech Republic." Salem Press Encyclopedia (2015): Research Starters. Web. 26 October 2015.

Kieval, Hillel J. "Jewish Prague, Christian Prague, And The Castle In The City's 'Golden Age'." Jewish Studies Quarterly 18.2 (2011): 202–215.

"Prague." Funk & Wagnalls New World Encyclopedia (2014): 1p. 1. Funk & Wagnalls New World Encyclopedia.

Logan, Webb. "Prague: The Czech Republic's 'Dear Little Mother'." World Literature Today 2014: 5.
