= Wilhelm Stiassny =

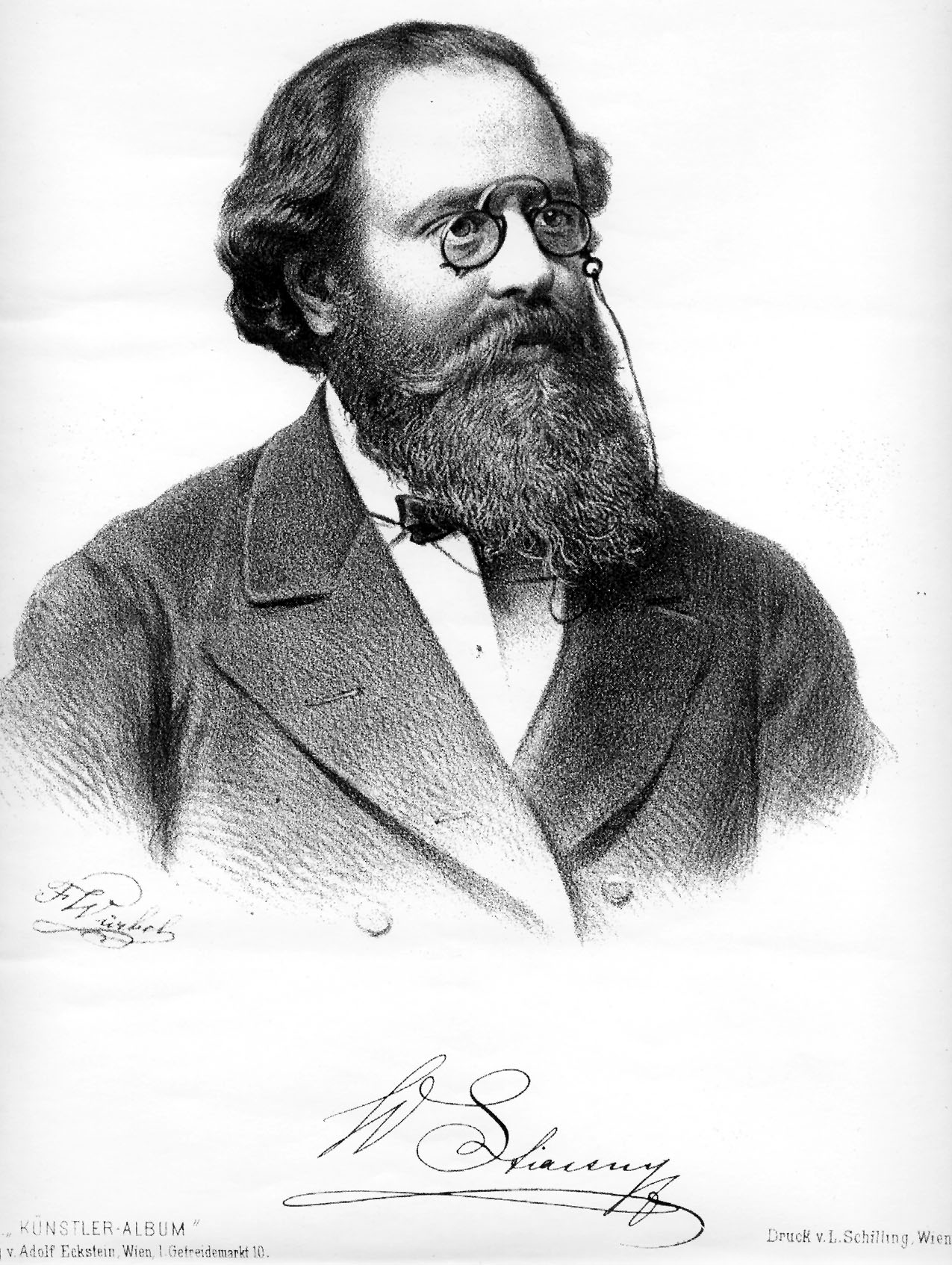
Wilhelm Stiassny, 1883

Wilhelm Stiassny (15 October 1842, Pressburg (Bratislava) – 11 July 1910, Bad Ischl) was a Jewish Austrian architect.

== Personal life ==
From 1857 to 1861, he studied at the Polytechnic in Vienna and afterwards studied architecture at the Academy of Fine Arts in Vienna under Friedrich von Schmidt.

In 1867 Stiassny was appointed delegate to the Paris Exposition by the Ministry of Commerce, and the following year he settled in Vienna as an architect. Until 1905 he oversaw the construction of 180 palaces, schools, residences, factories, hospitals, and synagogues, including the Rothschild Hospital at Währing (1873), the Hall of Ceremonies in the Jewish section of the Vienna Central Friedhof, the Königswarter Institute for the Blind at Hohewarte, the Kindergarten in the second district of Vienna, the Rothschild Hospital at Smyrna, and the synagogues at Malacky, Jablonec nad Nisou, Čáslav, and Weinberge (Vinohrady, now a part of Prague). From 1878 to 1900 Stiassny was a member of the aldermanic board of Vienna and of the Donauregulierungs-Commission. From 1879 he was a member of the board of trustees of the Jewish community of Vienna. In 1895, Stiassny founded the Society for the Conservation and Preservation of Art and Historical Monuments of Judaism, the world's first Jewish museum. He also served as head of the Jewish Colonization Association in Vienna.

== Buildings ==
- Israelitisches Blindeninstitut in Wien-Döbling, 1872
- Rothschild Hospital in Wien-Währing, 1873
- Synagogue in Malacky, 1886–1887
- Synagogue in Jablonec nad Nisou, 1892
- Polnische Schul, Orthodox Synagogue at Leopoldgasse 29, Vienna, 1892–1893
- Stanisławów Synagogue, Ivano-Frankivsk, Ukraine 1895–1899
- Jubilee Synagogue, today Jerusalem Synagogue in Prague, 1904–1906
- Synagogue in Wiener Neustadt, 1902
- Hall of Ceremonies in the Jewish section of the Vienna Central Friedhof, Israelitische Abteilung, 1. Tor
- More than 100 Apartment buildings
- Tombs, among which the tomb for the Austrian branch of the Rothschild family.
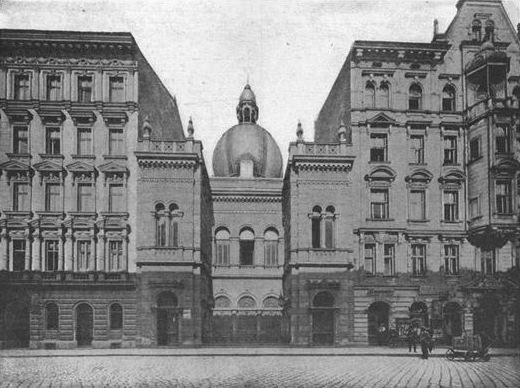
Polish Synagogue, Leopolsdgasse Vienna

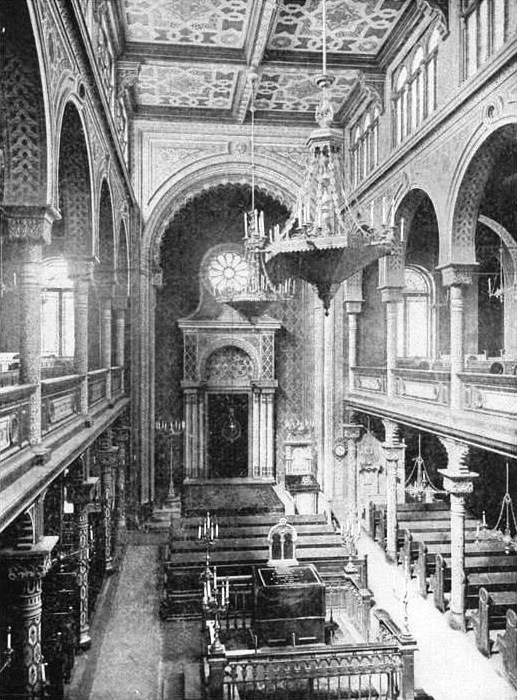
Interior of the "Polnische Schul"

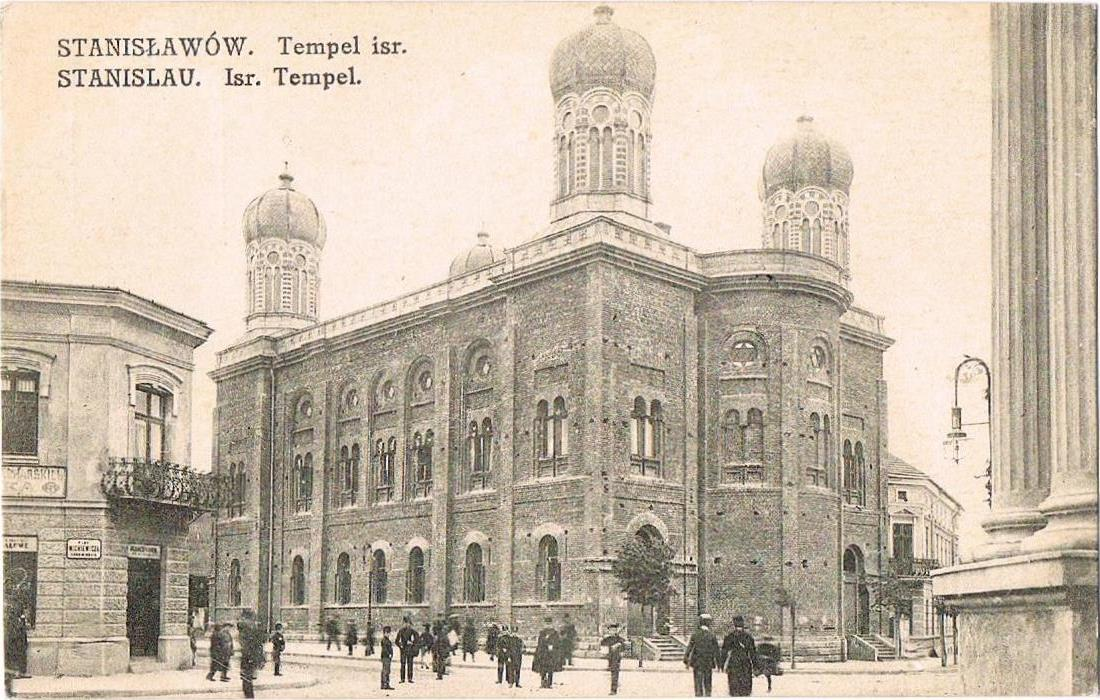
Stanisławów Synagogue, today Ivano-Frankivsk, Ukraine

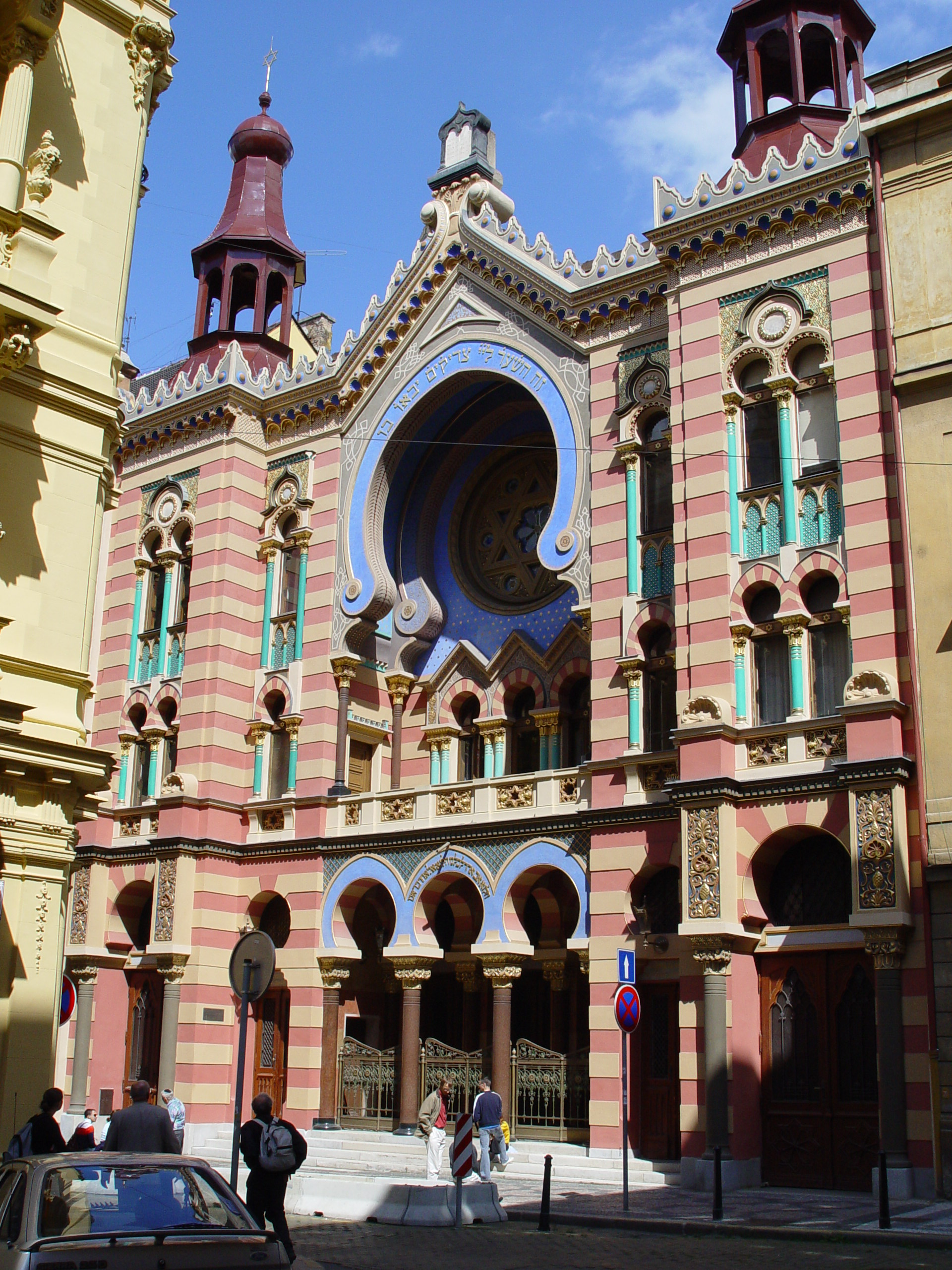
Jerusalem synagogue in Prague

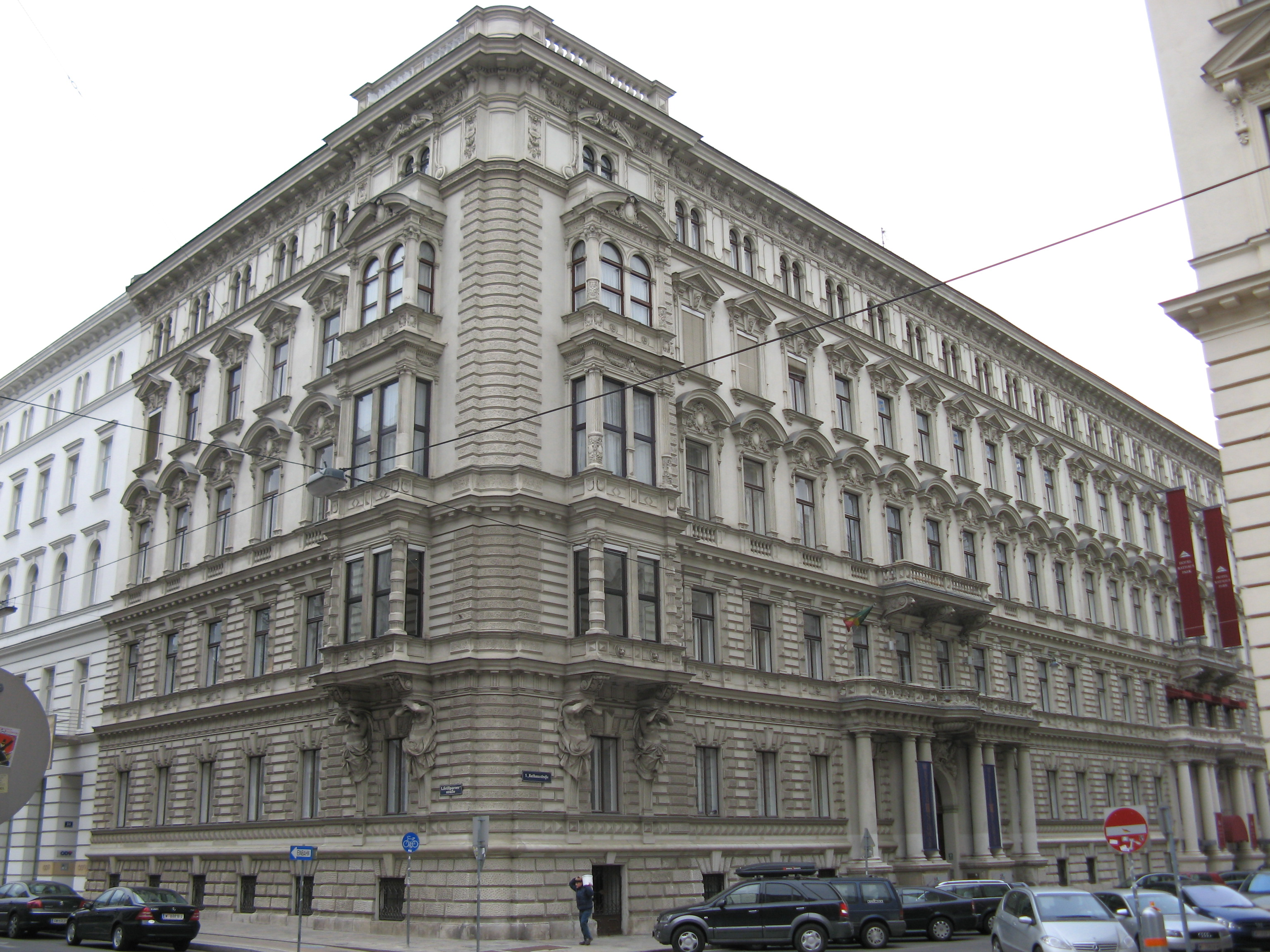
Königswarter House(1881), Rathausstraße 15–17, Vienna

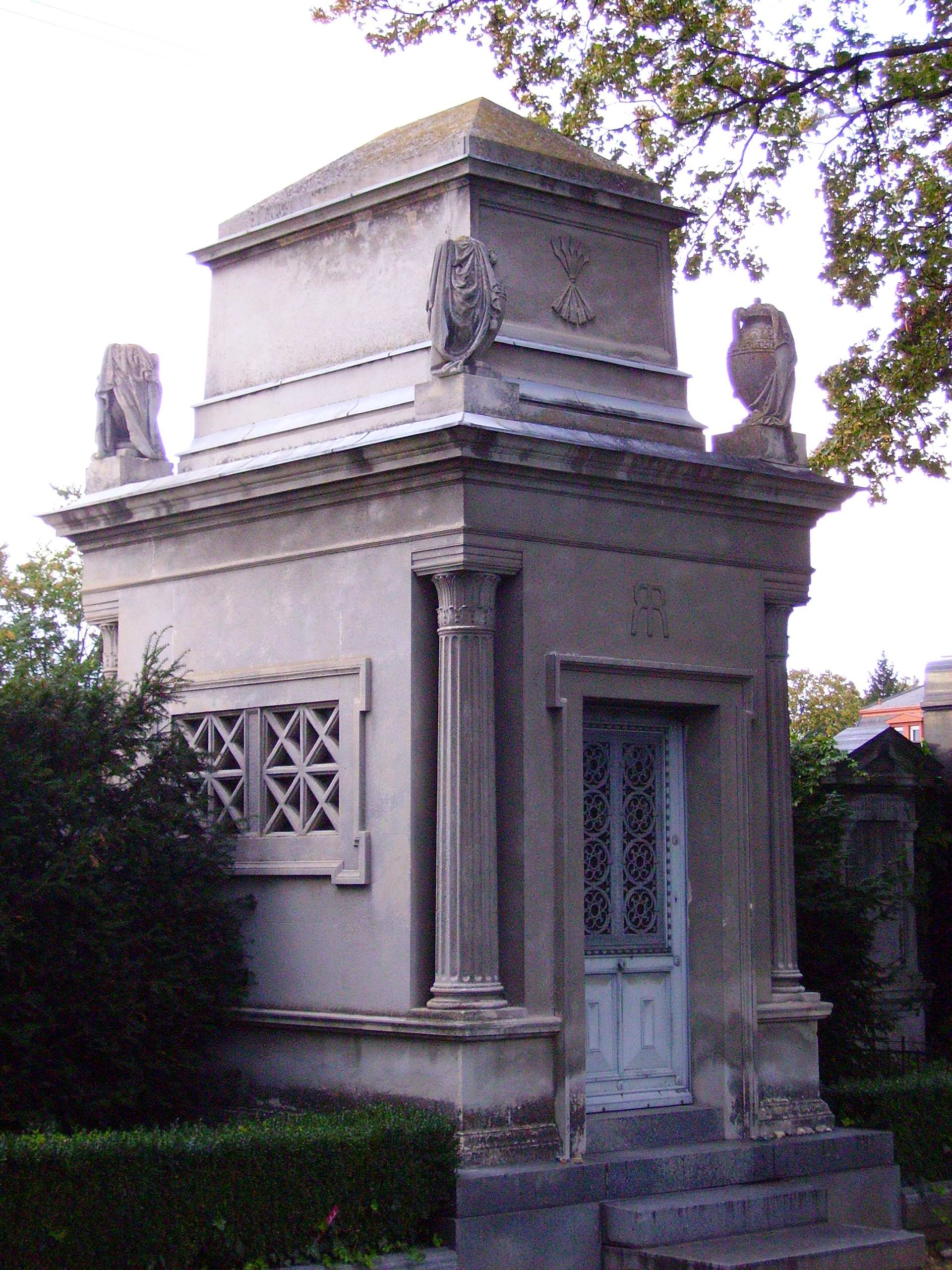
Rothschild-Tomb, Zentralfriedhof (Central Cemetery) Vienna
