= Coat of arms of Prague =

Versions
- Lesser coat of arms
- Armiger: Capital City of Prague
- Adopted: 1649 / 1991
- Motto: Praga Caput Rei publicae (English: Prague, Head of the Republic)

The coat of arms of the city of Prague, the capital of the Czech Republic, has a lesser and a greater version.

The coat of arms was first introduced in the 15th century (when the city of Prague corresponded to what is now the Old Town district). It consisted of three silver towers on a red shield. The coat of arms was improved by Frederick III in 1462, in recognition of the service of king George of Poděbrady, by replacing the silver tincture by gold. The full coat of arms in this period showed an imperial crown in the crest and two Bohemian lions as supporters.

In 1649, after the Thirty Years' War, Ferdinand III added an armour arm in silver holding a silver sword emerging from the city gate. This symbol represents the effective defense of the city against the Swedish army during the Thirty Years war. Ferdinand also added a crest showing the Habsburg eagle and his monogram FIII.

The coat of arms was inherited by the modern city of Prague upon its formation in 1784, when the four boroughs (Old Town, New Town, Hradčany and Lesser Town were unified. The Habsburg eagle in the crest was replaced by a third Bohemian lion in 1918, and the motto Praha matka měst ("Prague, the mother of cities") was added. During the communist period, the lion in the crest was shown with a red five-pointed star instead of a crown. The current version of the greater coat of arms, designed by Karel Pánek, was adopted in 1991. It restored the crown of the Bohemian lion in the crest and changed the motto to PRAGA CAPUT REI PUBLICAE ("Prague, the Capital of the Republic").

The number of bricks shown corresponds to the number of cadastral subdivisions of Prague, currently 112.

== Use of the Coat of Arms ==
The use of the emblem of the Capital City Prague is regulated by Act No. 131/2000 Coll. of 13 April 2000 on the Capital City of Prague.

The use of the coat of arms and the flag of the Capital City Prague may only be used by the Capital City Prague and legal persons and institutions established or set up by the Capital City Prague. State bodies and natural and legal persons may use the emblem and flag of the Capital City Prague only with the written consent of the Capital City Prague and the emblem and flag of a municipal district only with the written consent of the municipal district.

== Previous versions ==
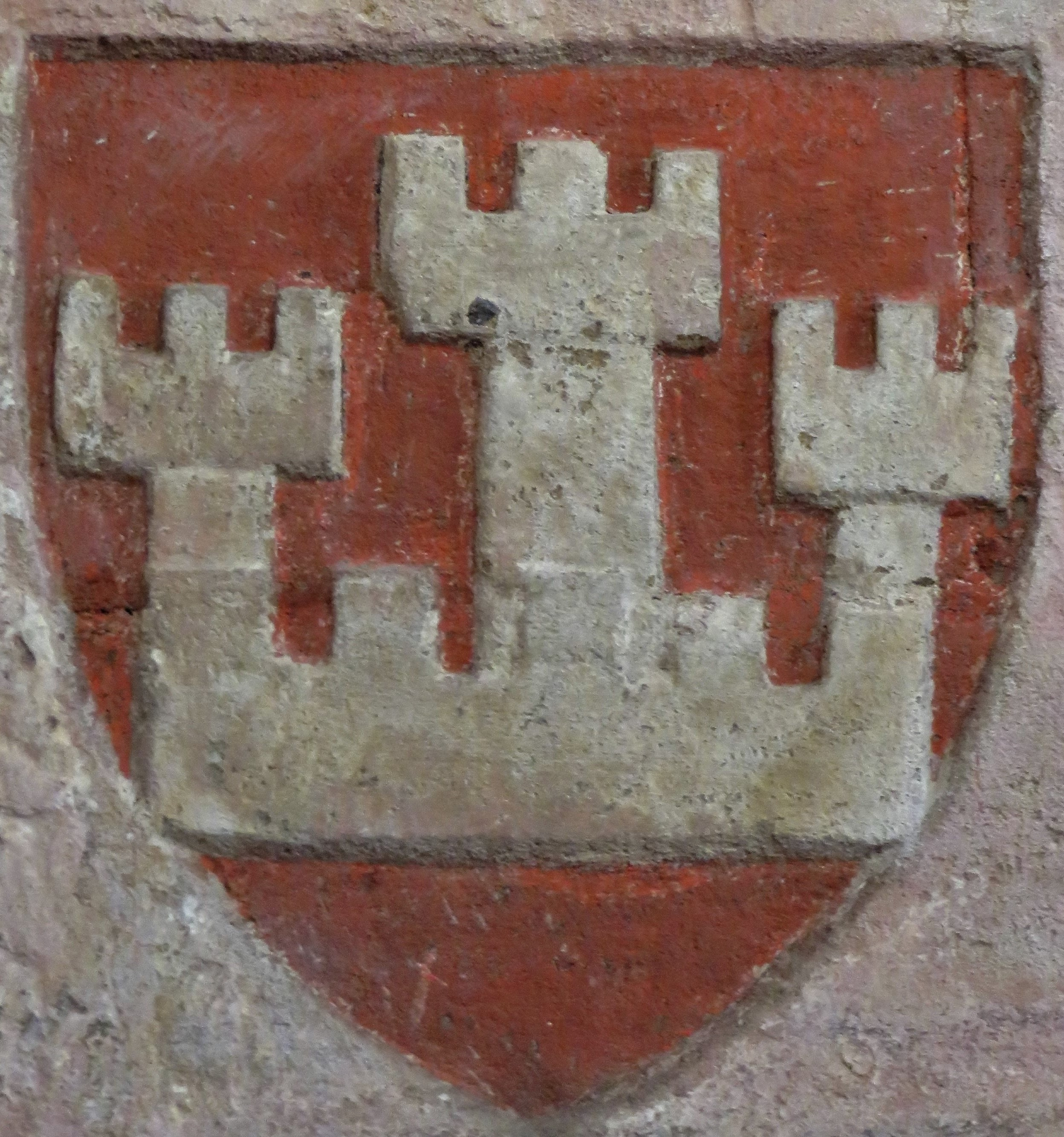
Coat of arms in its oldest known form (c. 1360)

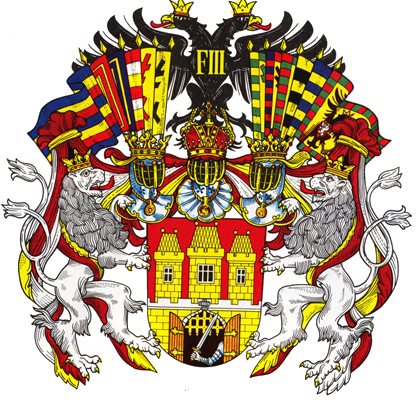
Coat of arms in the Habsburg, Austrian and Austro-Hungarian Empire (1649–1918)

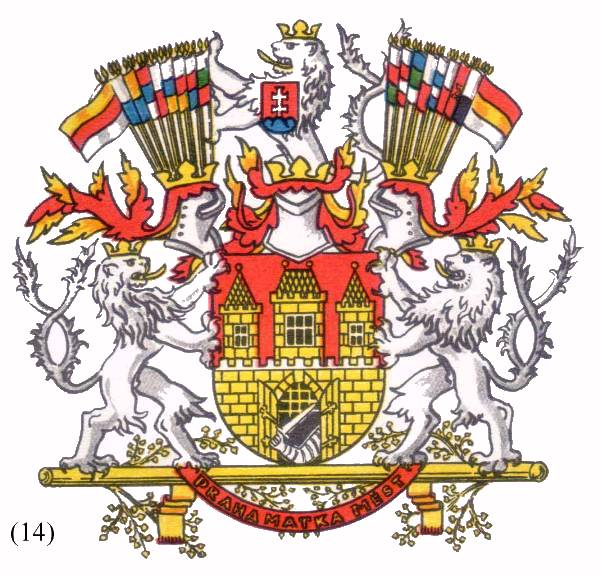
Coat of arms in the Czechoslovak Republic (1927–1941)
(1945–1964)

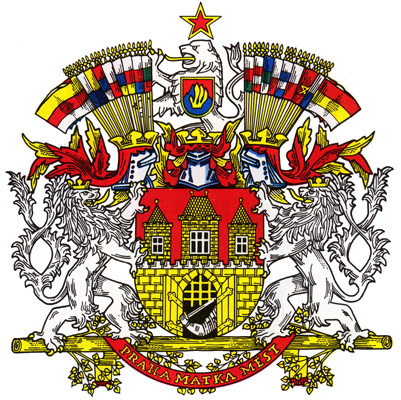
Coat of arms in the Czechoslovak Socialist and Czech and Slovak Federative Republic (1964–1991)

== See also ==
- History of Prague
