= Polish Synagogue =

Former synagogue in Vienna, Austria

- Polnische Schul (German); Synagoga Polska (Polish)
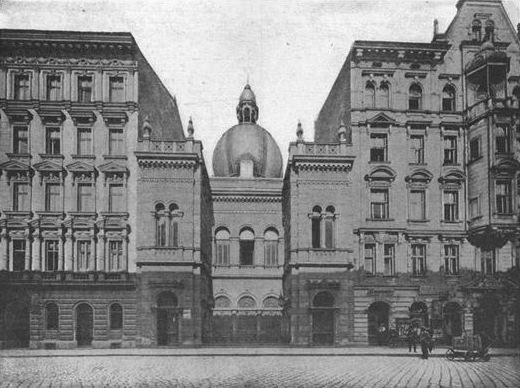
- Exterior view of the Polnische Schul

- Location of the former synagogue in Austria

Religion
- Affiliation: Orthodox Judaism (former)
- Rite: Nusach Ashkenaz
- Ecclesiastical or organizational status: Synagogue (1892–1938)
- Status: Destroyed

Location
- Location: Leopoldsgasse 29, Vienna
- Country: Austria
- Interactive map of Polish Synagogue
- Coordinates: 48°13′06″N 16°22′39″E

Architecture
- Architect: Wilhelm Stiassny
- Type: Synagogue architecture
- Style: Moorish Revival
- Completed: 1892
- Destroyed: 9–10 November 1938 on Kristallnacht
- Capacity: 450 men; 317 women

The Polish Synagogue (German: Polnische Schul,German pronunciation: [/ˈpɔlnɪʃə ˈʃuːl/]; Polish: Synagoga Polska) was an Orthodox Jewish synagogue, located in Leopoldsgasse, Vienna, Austria.

Designed by Wilhelm Stiassny and completed in 1892, the synagogue was built specifically for the Polish Jewish community (Note: In Vienna, "Polish Jews" was the name given to Jews from Galicia, being the part of Poland in the Austro-Hungarian Empire after the 1795 division of Poland.) and was loaded with decorative elements and its Moorish Revival style distinguished it clearly from other buildings. The synagogue had seats for 450 male and 317 female worshipers.

The Polnische Schul was destroyed during the Kristallnacht in 1938. Today a modern building stands there with a Tafel.

== See also ==
- History of the Jews in Vienna
