= 2006 Prague terror plot =

Terrorist incident in the Czech Republic

The 2006 Prague terror plot was revealed on 23 September 2006, when security services in Prague went on high alert due to suspicions of an imminent terror attack.

== The plot ==
According to the Czech Republic's leading newspaper, Mlada fronta Dnes, Islamist extremists were planning to kidnap and kill Jews in Prague. They intended to take Jews captive in a Prague synagogue, make demands which could not be met, and then blow up the building, killing everybody inside. Interior Minister Ivan Langer said the situation was "the most serious ever".

According to Czech Chief Rabbi Efraim Sidon, the attack had been planned against the Jerusalem Synagogue in the centre of the city, and not against a synagogue in the Jewish Quarter. The Czech security services were investigating a possible link between fresh terror threats made by radical Muslims to kill Jews in Prague and the arrest of a Pakistani citizen in Oslo.
