= Jubilee Synagogue =

Synagogue in Prague, Czech Republic

- Czech: Jubilejní synagoga
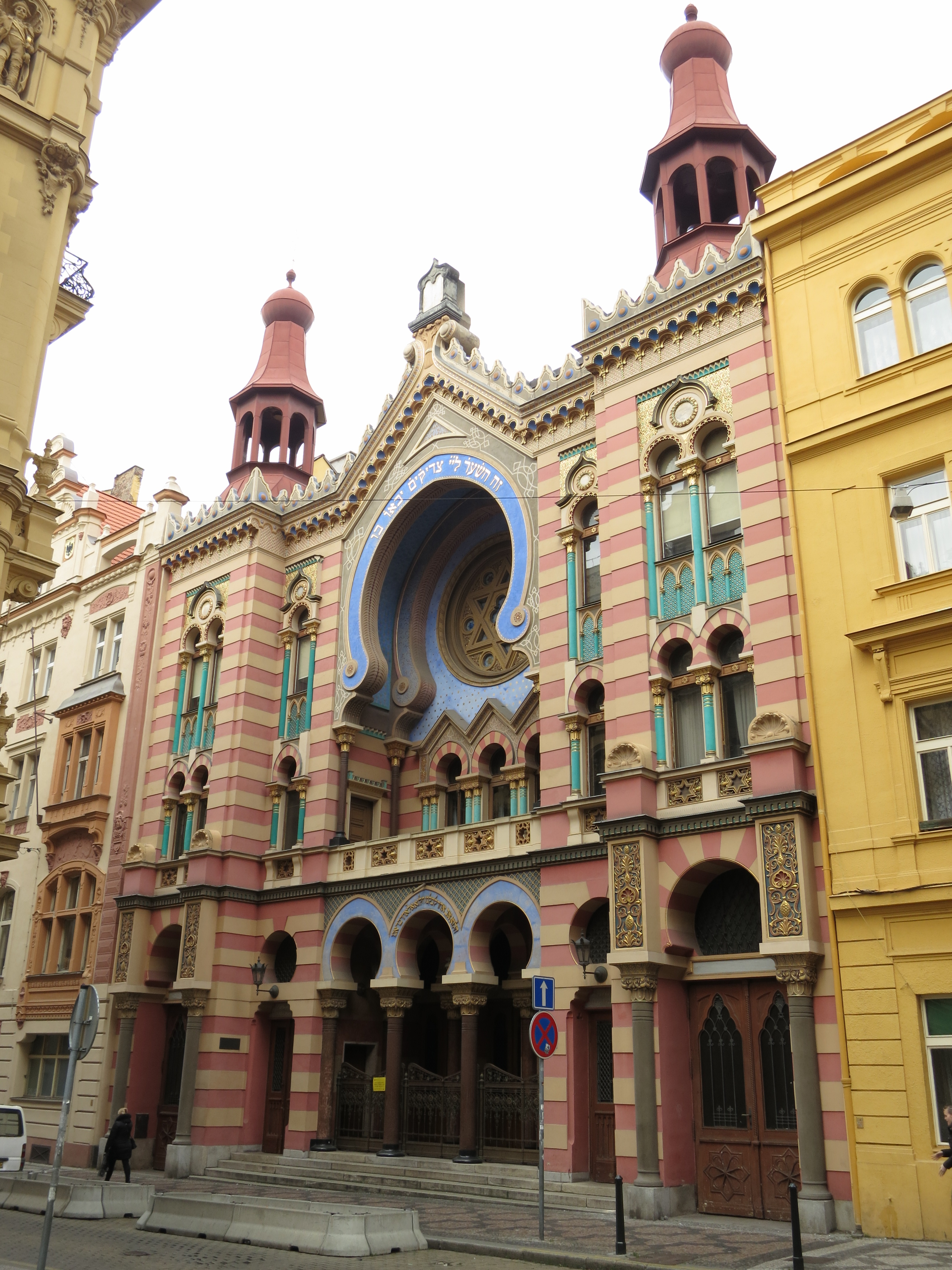
- Main façade of the synagogue, in 2014

- Location of the synagogue in the Czech Republic

Religion
- Affiliation: Orthodox Judaism
- Ecclesiastical or organisational status: Synagogue
- Status: Active

Location
- Location: Jeruzalémská 7, Nové Město district, Prague
- Country: Czech Republic
- Coordinates: 50°05′05″N 14°25′55″E

Architecture
- Architect: Wilhelm Stiassny
- Type: Synagogue architecture
- Style: Moorish Revival; Art Nouveau
- General contractor: Alois Richter
- Established: 1896 (as a congregation)
- Completed: 1906

Specifications
- Direction of façade: West
- Capacity: 850 worshippers
- Spire: Two

The Jubilee Synagogue (Czech: Jubilejní synagoga), also known as the Jerusalem Synagogue (Czech: Jeruzalémská synagoga), is an active Orthodox Jewish synagogue, located on Jerusalem Street in the Nové Město district of Prague, in the Czech Republic. It is currently the largest synagogue in Prague (since the complete destruction of the nearby Vinohrady Synagogue in 1951), although not the largest in the country (see Great Synagogue (Plzeň)).

== History ==
The synagogue was built in 1906, designed by Wilhelm Stiassny and built by Alois Richte, the synagogue was initially named in honor of the golden Jubilee of the reign of Emperor Franz Joseph I of Austria in 1898. The synagogue was built as a replacement for three synagogues (the Zigeiner, the Velkodvorská, and the New) destroyed between 1898 and 1906.

Although built as a Reform synagogue (with an organ and a choir), it is nowadays used by the more traditional (Modern Orthodox) members of the Prague Jewish community, aligning itself officially with Orthodox Judaism. Still, compared to the famous other active synagogue of Prague, the Old New Synagogue, the Jubilee Synagogue is far less stringent in many ways.

== Design and history ==
The synagogue was designed in Moorish Revival form with Art Nouveau decoration, especially in the interior. It was lately renovated and serves religious purposes. Following the Czechoslovak declaration of independence in 1918, it was called the Jerusalem Synagogue as the name Jubilee Synagogue referred to the anniversary of the rule of Franz Joseph I in the defeated Austro-Hungarian monarchy.

The synagogue preserves inscribed plaques removed from the former Zigeuner Synagogue, demolished by the urban renewal campaign that was the cause of the building of the Jubilee synagogue.

The inscription over the entrance reads Hebrew: זה השער ליי צדיקים יבאו בו, lit. 'This is the gate to which the righteous will come'.

The façade and form of the synagogue are a hybridized blend of Moorish Revival and Art Nouveau, with horseshoe arches on the facade and on the interior columns supporting the women's galleries in a three-bay building. The Mudéjar red-and-white coursing of the stone facade is particularly striking. Inside, the Moorish elements are overlaid with brilliantly painted Art Nouveau patterning.

For a slightly more than a century it was open to the public purely as a house of worship, except for the period of Nazi German occupation when it was used only to store confiscated Jewish property. However, having been exensively restored, on 1 April 2008 it opened its doors on a regular basis to tourists and aficionados of historic architecture. The World Monuments Fund provided support between 1992 and 2010 to the restoration of the synagogue.

== Gallery ==
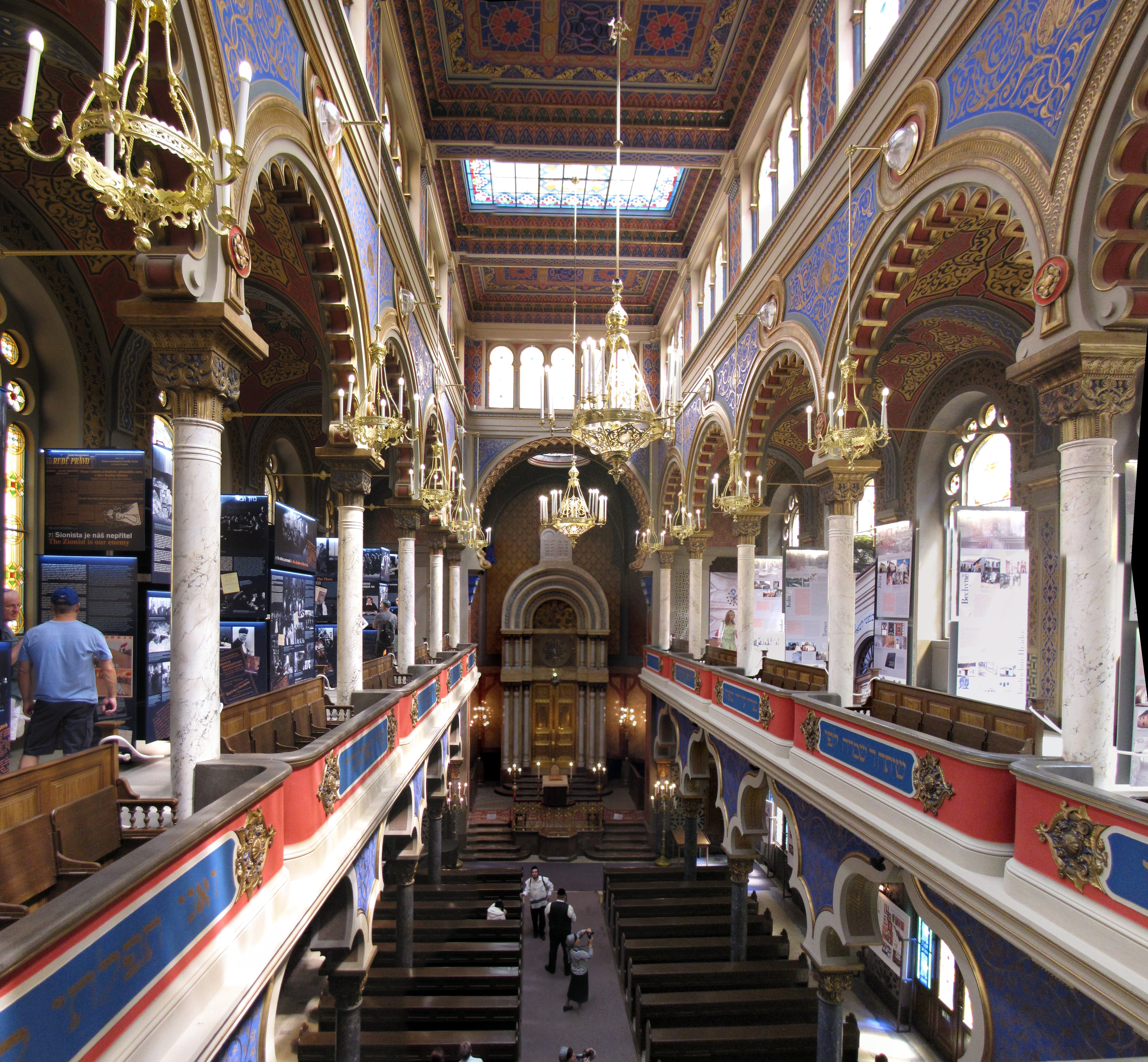
The interior of the synagogue

== See also ==
- History of the Jews in the Czech Republic
- 2006 Prague terror plot
