= Timeline of Brno =

The following is a timeline of the history of the city of Brno, Moravia, Czech Republic.

== Prior to 20th century ==
- 980-1020 - Basilica of the Assumption of Our Lady founded.
- 11th C. - Vratislaus II of Bohemia bestows the town on his younger brother Otto I of Olomouc.
- early 13th C. - Church of St. James established.
- mid 13th C. - Špilberk Castle established.
- 1229 - Brno charter endorsed by Ottocar I of Bohemia.
- 1243 - City incorporated.
- 1296 - Cathedral of St. Peter and Paul established.
- 1343 - Old Town Hall (Brno) in use.
- 1356 - Church of St. Thomas consecrated.
- 1428 - Brno unsuccessfully besieged by Hussites.
- 1451 - 27 July: expulsion of the Jews.
- 1467 - Brno besieged by forces of George of Bohemia.
- 1485 - First printing press in operation.
- 1645 - Brno besieged by Swedish forces led by Lennart Torstensson.
- 1655 - Dolní Kounice Synagogue founded.
- 1742 - Brno besieged by Prussians.
- 1766 - Cloth factory begins operating.
- 1777 - Roman Catholic Diocese of Brno established; Mathias Franz Graf von Chorinsky Freiherr von Ledske becomes bishop.
- 1780s - Joseph II, Holy Roman Emperor evicts the friars from St Thomas's Abbey.
- 1782 - Brno becomes capital of Moravia-Silesia.
- 1786 - Lužánky Park established.
- 1805 - 2 December: Battle of Austerlitz occurs near Brno; forces of Napoleon headquartered in city.
- 1818 - Museum Francisceum founded.

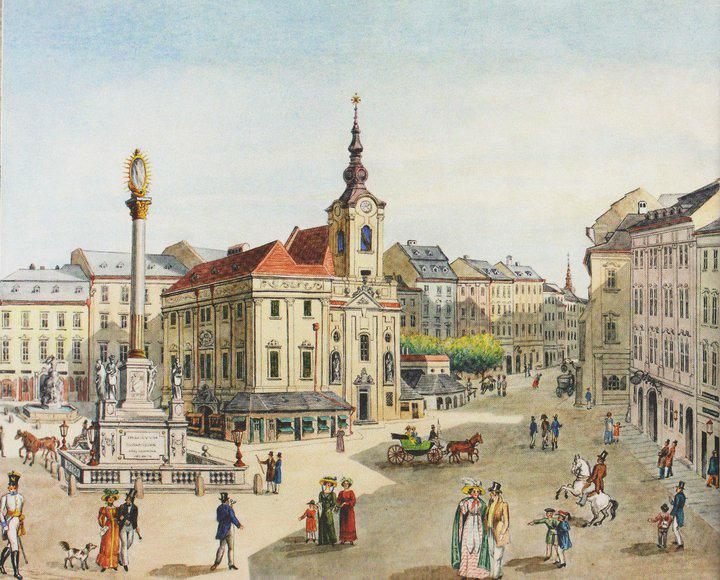
Náměstí Svobody (Liberty Square) in the 1820s

- 1822/30 - Silvio Pellico, an Italian writer, confined in Špilberk Castle.
- 1838 - Brno main railway station opened.
- 1839 - Emperor Ferdinand Northern Railway operates to Břeclav.
- 1843 - Labor unrest.
- 1848 - October: Labor demonstration.
- 1849
  - German Technical University in Brno founded.
  - Population: 45,189.
- 1855 - Synagogue consecrated.
- 1861 - Natural History Society established.
- 1864 - Vankovka engineering works built near Brno.
- 1866 - 13 July: Prussians in power.
- 1867
  - Czech-language secondary school founded.
  - Red Church construction completed.
- 1869 - Population: 73,771.
- 1870s - Brno Philharmonic begins its existence at the Besední dům.
- 1872 - Starobrno Brewery built.
- 1880 - Gustav Winterholler becomes mayor.
- 1881 - Organ School founded.
- 1882 - Deutsches Stadttheater (Mahen Theatre) built.
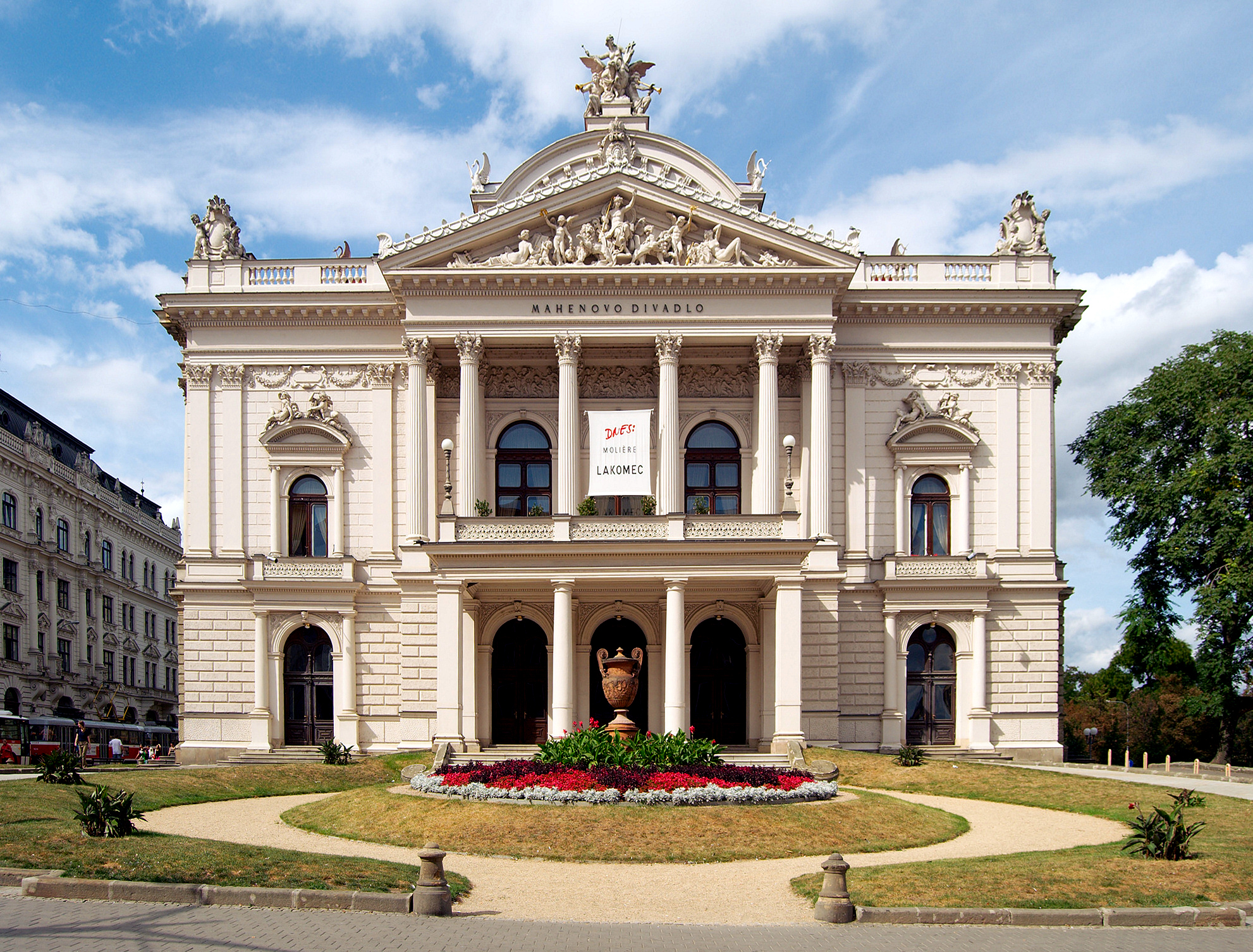
  Mahen Theatre, Brno
- 1891 - Deutsches Haus (Brno) opens.
- 1894 - August Wieser becomes mayor.
- 1899 - Imperial Czech Technical University of Franz Joseph founded.
- 1900 - Population: 108,944.

== 20th century ==
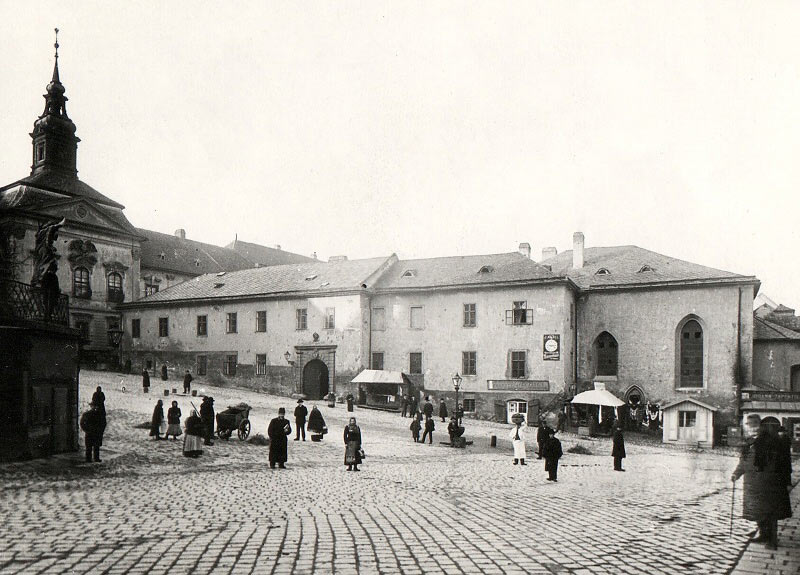
Dominikánské náměstí (Dominican Square) with the Royal Chapel in 1904

- 1910 - Population: 125,737.
- 1913 - SK Židenice football club formed.
- 1918
  - Československá zbrojovka manufactory in business.
  - Moravia becomes part of Czechoslovakia.
  - Brno City Archive Library established.
- 1919
  - Bohunice and Slatina become part of Brno.
  - Masaryk University and Brno Conservatory founded.
- 1926 - 18 December: Premiere of Janáček's opera Makropulos Affair.
- 1928
  - Brno Exhibition Centre opens.
  - Exhibition of Contemporary Culture held.
  - Centrum department store built.
- 1930
  - Modernist Villa Tugendhat built.
  - Population: 264,925.
- 1935 - New City Hall (Brno) in use.
- 1939
  - Brno (and whole country) occupied by German Nazis.
  - The Germans established an internment camp for Romani people in the city.
- 1941 - First Martial Law, 239 people executed in Brno by the Germans, another 1,000 in concentration camps.
- 1943 - October: The Germans established a subcamp of the Auschwitz concentration camp in the city, and brought the first transport of 251 prisoners, mostly Poles, to the subcamp.
- 1944 - Internment camp for Romani people dissolved.
- 1945
  - German Technical University in Brno closed.
  - Subcamp of the Auschwitz concentration camp dissolved and remaining prisoners evacuated to Austria.
  - Many Germans fled Brno, the rest were later expelled.
  - Liberation of Brno
  - Brno City Theatre established.
- 1946 - Brno–Tuřany Airport opens.
- 1947
  - Janáček Academy of Music and Performing Arts established.
  - Královo Pole indoor arena opens.
  - Population: 133,637 city; 934,437 province.

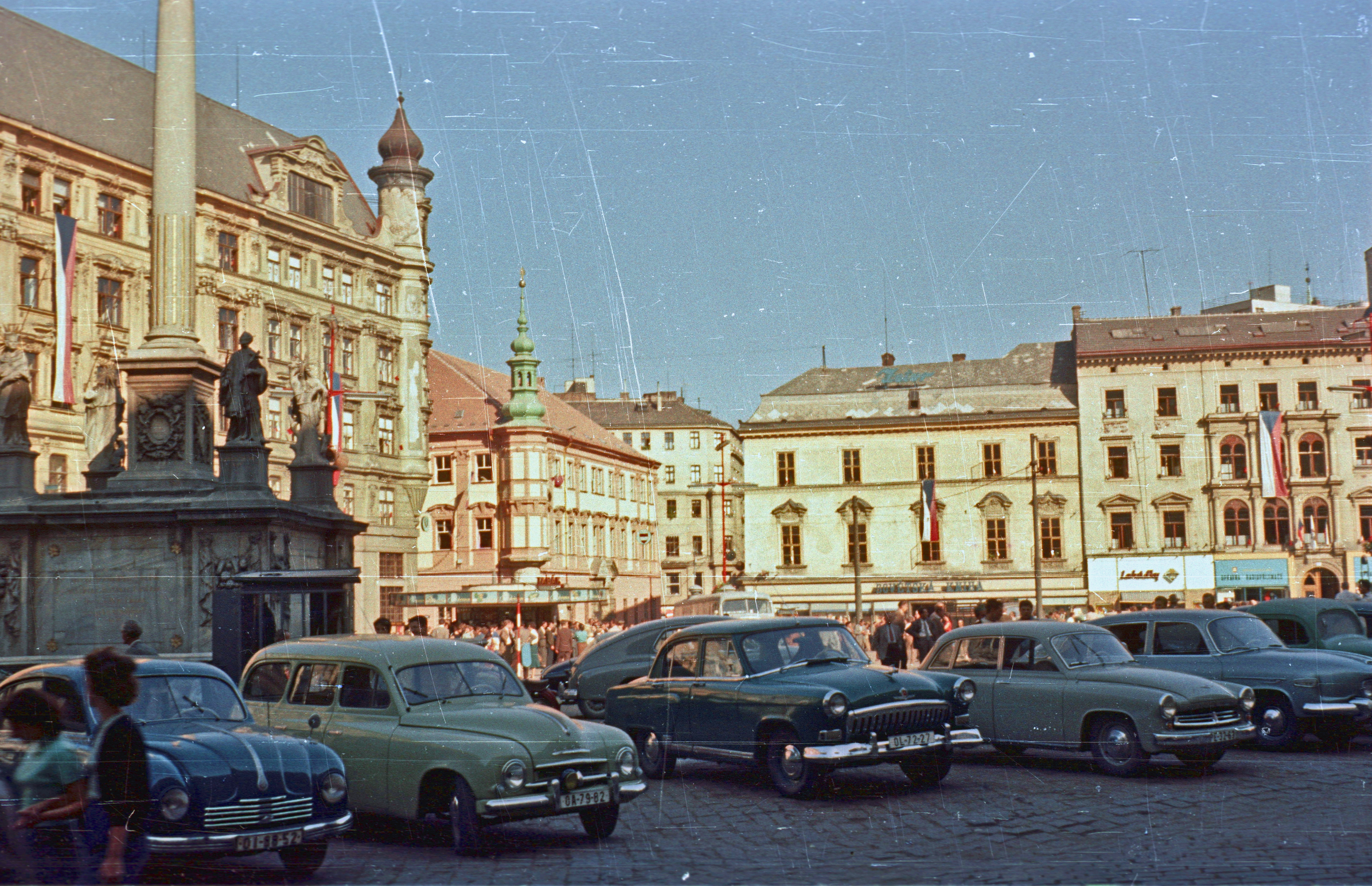
Náměstí Svobody in 1958

- 1953 - Brno Zoo and Stadion Za Lužánkami open.
- 1955 - Julius Fucik Theatre active.
- 1956 - Moravian Karst nature reserve established near city.
- 1961
  - Moravian Gallery in Brno established.
  - Population: 314,235.
- 1963
  - Biennial of Graphic Design, Brno begins.
  - Oldřich Vaverka becomes mayor.
- 1965 - Janáček Theatre opens.
- 1974 - Population: 343,860.
- 1976 - Marie Bartošová falls into a sinkhole created by a tram station collapse. Her remains were not found until 1990s, and the sudden accident accelerated the systematic exploration of the Brno underground.
- 1980 - HaDivadlo theatre troupe active.
- 1982 - Starobrno Rondo Aréna opens.
- 1985 - Dukovany Nuclear Power Station commissioned near city.
- 1987 - Motorsport Masaryk Circuit opens.
- 1990
  - Brno becomes a statutory city.
  - City divided into 29 districts.
  - International Institute for Political Science of Masaryk University founded.
  - Vojtěch Cikrle becomes Catholic bishop.
- 1991 - Kabinet múz cultural space founded.
- 1994 - Dagmar Lastovecká becomes mayor.
- 1997 - M-Palace hi-rise built.
- 1998 - Petr Duchoň becomes mayor.

== 21st century ==
- 2001 - Cinema City Velky Spalicek opens.
- 2004
  - University of Defence (Czech Republic) established.
  - ProtestFest begins.
  - Richard Svoboda becomes mayor.
- 2006 - Roman Onderka becomes mayor.
- 2009 - September: Catholic pope visits Brno.
- 2010 - Cinema Mundi International Film Festival begins.
- 2011
  - Labyrinth under Vegetable Market, Brno (historic site) opens.
  - Population: 385,913.
- 2012
  - Spielberk Towers built.
  - Brno Ossuary (historic site) opens.
- 2013 - AZ Tower built.
- 2014 - Petr Vokřál becomes mayor.
- 2015 - June: Anti-immigration demonstration.
- 2018 - 21 March: Brno Open Data Platform launched.

== See also ==
- History of Brno
- Other names of Brno
- List of mayors of Brno
- List of bishops of Brno
- List of churches of Brno
- History of Moravia
- Timelines of other cities in the Czech Republic: Prague

== Bibliography ==
=== in English ===
- Abraham Rees (1819), "Brunn", The Cyclopaedia, London: Longman, Hurst, Rees, Orme & Brown
- Charles Knight, ed. (1867). "Brunn". The English cyclopaedia / Conducted by Charles Knight v. 2 geography. English Cyclopaedia. Vol. 2. London: Bradbury, Evans, & Co. pp. 166–167. hdl:2027/nyp.33433000064794.
- David Kay (1880), "Principal Towns: Brünn", Austria-Hungary, Foreign Countries and British Colonies, London: Sampson Low, Marston, Searle, & Rivington, hdl:2027/mdp.39015030647005
- "Brunn", Bradshaw's Illustrated Hand-book to Germany and Austria, London: W.J. Adams & Sons, 1896
- Norddeutscher Lloyd (1896), "Brunn", Guide through Germany, Austria-Hungary, Italy, Switzerland, France, Belgium, Holland and England, Berlin: J. Reichmann & Cantor, OCLC 8395555
- Adolf Frankl-Grün (1907). "Brünn". The Jewish encyclopedia ; a descriptive record of the history, religion, literature, and customs of the Jewish people from the earliest times to the present ... V.3. Jewish Encyclopedia. Vol. 3. New York: Funk & Wagnalls. hdl:2027/osu.32435029752920.
- Joseph Lins (1908). "Brünn". The Catholic encyclopedia; an international work of reference on the constitution, doctrine, discipline, and history of the Catholic Church. Catholic Encyclopedia. New York: The Encyclopedia Press, inc.
- "Brünn" . Encyclopædia Britannica. Vol. 4 (11th ed.). 1910. pp. 684–685.

=== in German ===
- C.J. Schmidt (1835). Brünn und seine Umgebungen (in German). Brünn: Seidel.
- Gustav Trautenberger. Chronik der Landeshauptstadt Brünn (in German). Brünn: Deutsches Haus (Brno). 1891-1897
- B. Bretholz (1911). Geschichte der Stadt Brünn (in German). Brünn: Verlag des Vereines. (includes timeline 1091-1411)
