= List of mayors of Brno =

Mayor of Brno
- Coat of arms of Brno

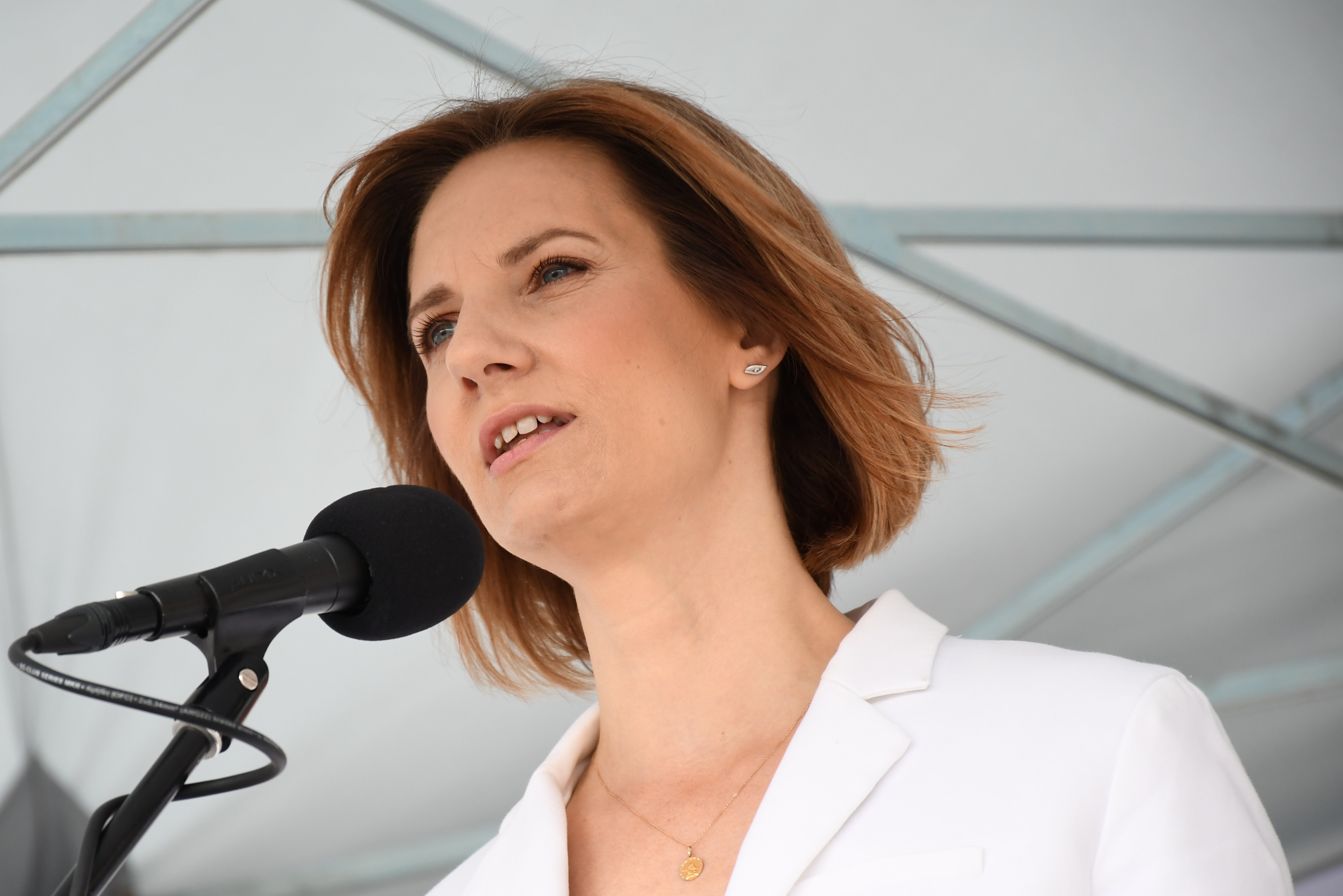
- Incumbent; Markéta Vaňková since 2018
- Inaugural holder: Franz Rauscher
- Formation: 1784
- Website: brno.cz

List of mayors of Brno:

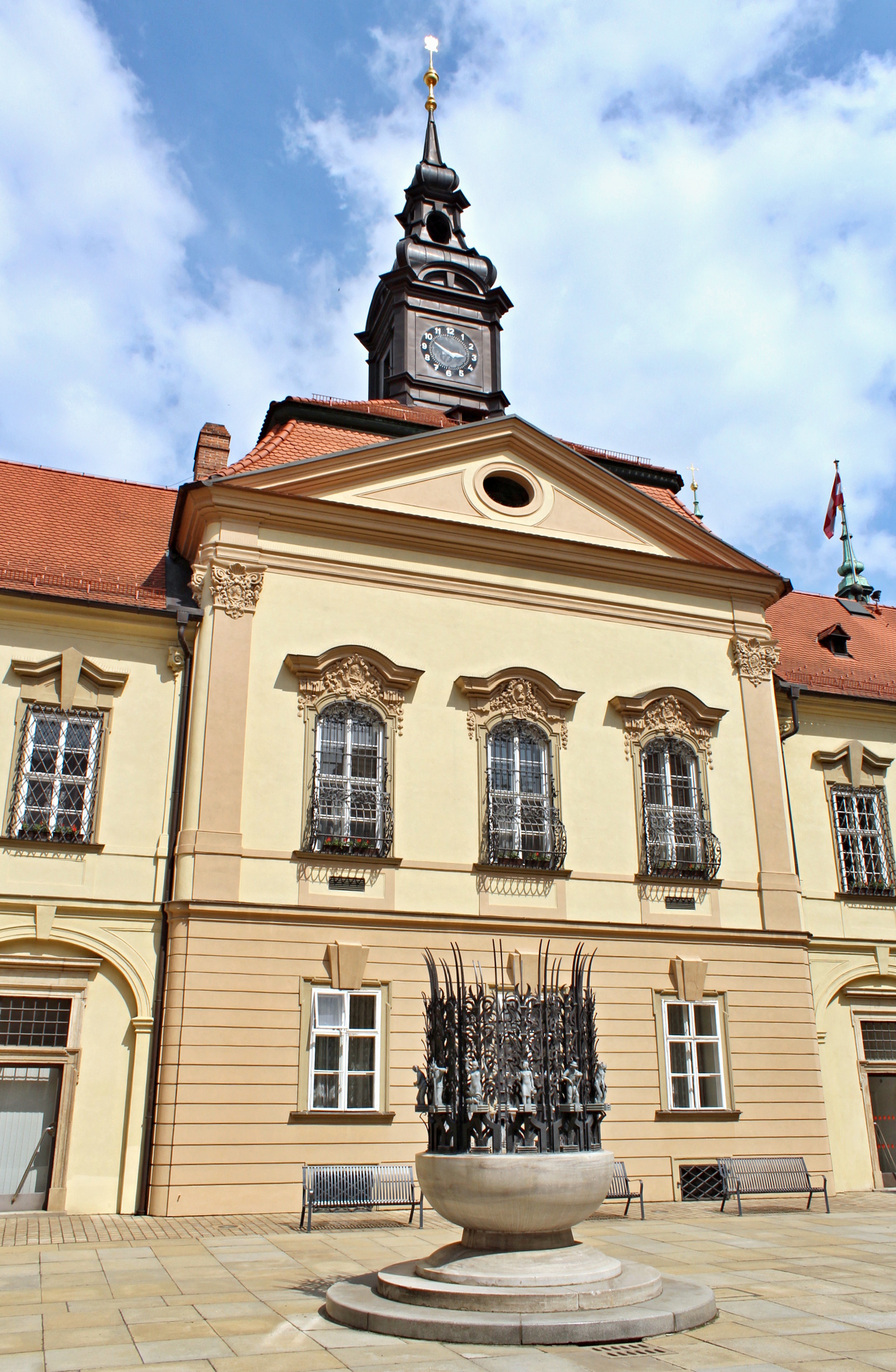
Brno City Hall

Period	Name
1971–1976	Ing. Vladimír Štroner (KSC)
1976–1980	Ing. František Chabičovský (KSC)
1980–1983	JUDr. Rudolf Suchánek (KSC)
1983–1989	JUDr. Alois Skoupý (KSC)
1989–1990	Ing. Josef Pernica (KSC)
1990	Ing. Jiří Trmač (for 4 hours) (non partisan for CSL)
1990	Pavel Podsedník (CSNS)
1990–1992	Ing. arch. Václav Mencl (ODS)
1992–1994	Ing. Jiří Horák (ODS)
1994–1998	JUDr. Dagmar Lastovecká (ODS)
1998–2004	RNDr. Petr Duchoň (ODS)
2004–2006	PhDr. Richard Svoboda, MBA (ODS)
2006–2014	Bc. Roman Onderka, MBA (CSSD)
2014–2018	Petr Vokřál (ANO 2011)
2018–	JUDr. Markéta Vaňková (ODS)

== See also ==
- Timeline of Brno
