= 2010 Brno municipal election =

Municipal election in Brno in 2010

- 15–16 October 2010

All 55 seats in the Assembly 28 seats needed for a majority
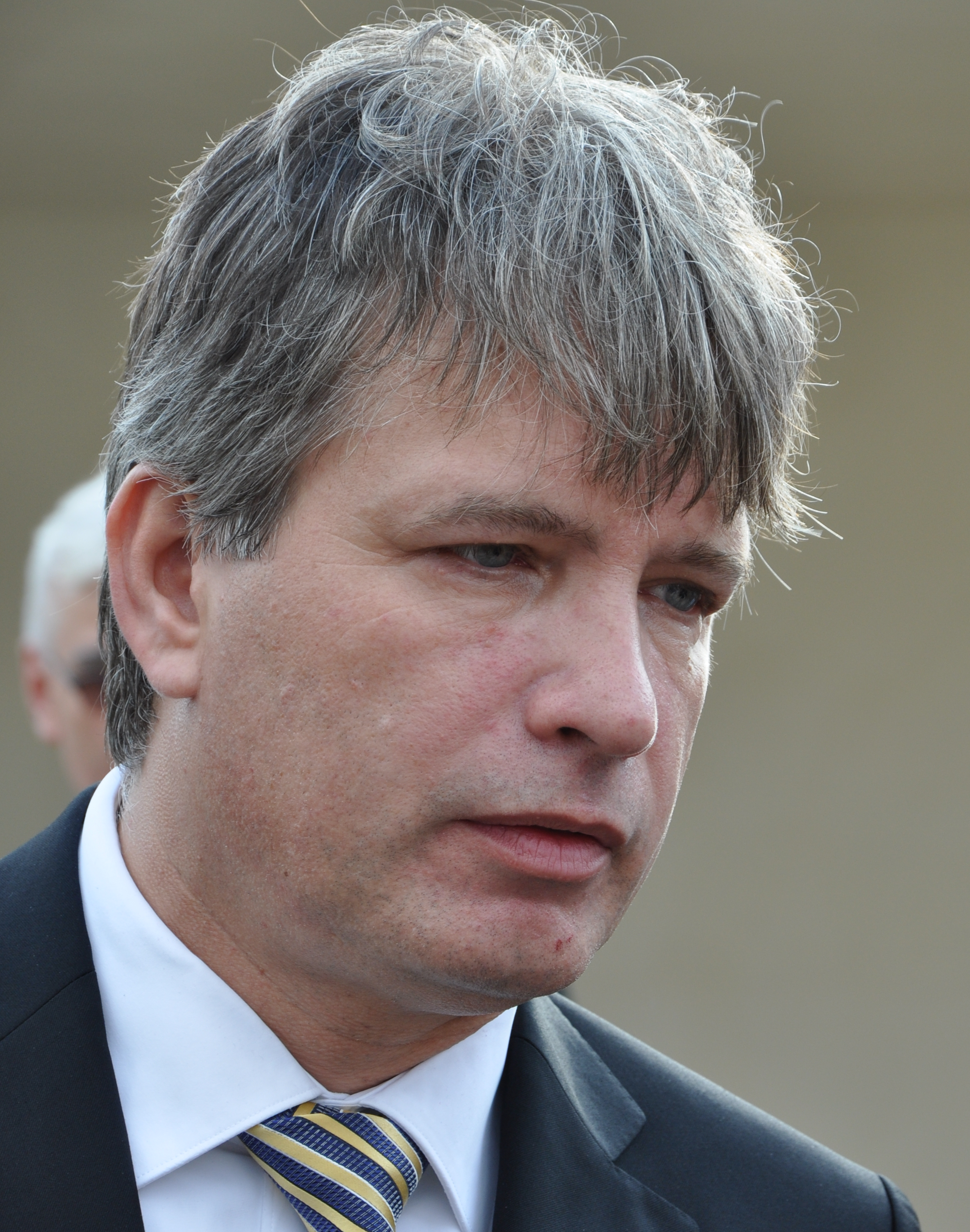

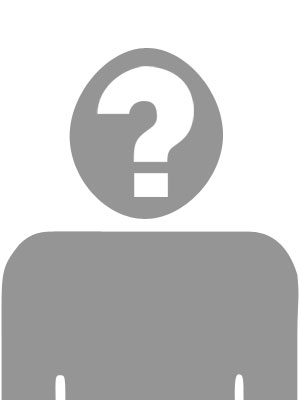

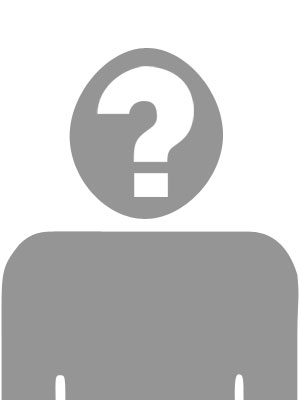

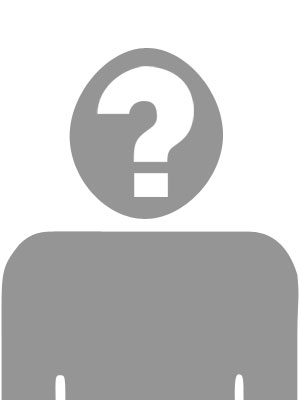

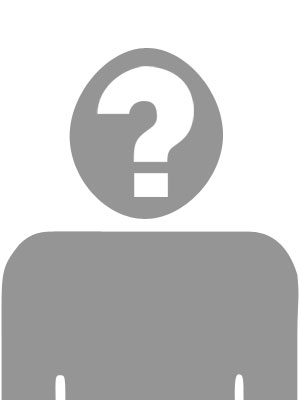

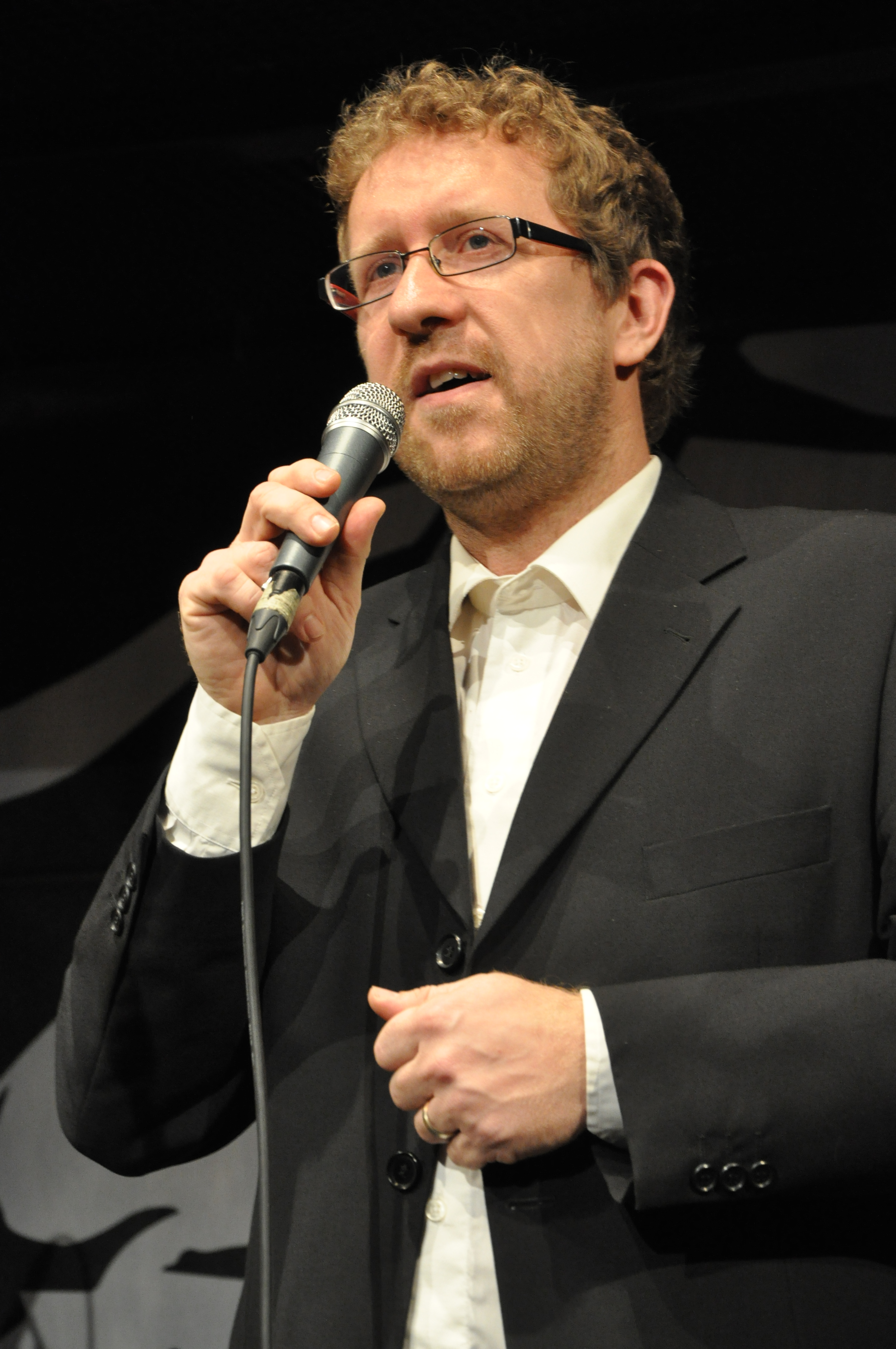
	First party	Second party	Third party
Leader	Roman Onderka	Robert Kotzian	Irena Matonohová
Party	ČSSD	ODS	TOP 09
Seats won	19	14	9
Popular vote	2,004,330	1,447,360	932,790
Percentage	30.4%	22.0%	14.2%
	Fourth party	Fifth party	Sixth party
Leader	Daniel Rychnovský	Helena Sýkorová	Martin Ander
Party	Christian and Democratic Union – Czechoslovak People's Party	KSČM	Greens
Seats won	6	4	3
Popular vote	605,298	487,629	372,917
Percentage	9.2%	7.4%	5.7%
Mayor before election
Roman Onderka
ČSSD
Elected mayor
Roman Onderka
ČSSD

Municipal election in Brno was held as part of Czech municipal elections in 2010. It was a victory for Czech Social Democratic Party (ČSSD). ČSSD formed grand coalition with Civic Democratic Party.

== Results ==
Party	Votes	%	Seats
Czech Social Democratic Party	2,004,330	30.41	19
Civic Democratic Party	1,447,360	21.96	14
TOP 09	932,790	14.15	9
Christian and Democratic Union – Czechoslovak People's Party	605,298	9.18	6
Communist Party of Bohemia and Moravia	487,629	7.40	4
Green Party	372,917	5.66	3
Brno 2010 - Together For Brno	206,923	3.14	0
Public Affairs	198,032	3.00	0
Independent Democrats	110,474	1.68	0
Czech Pirate Party	60,894	0.92	0
Party of Civic Rights	60,285	0.91	0
Workers' Party of Social Justice	37,534	0.57	0
Moravané and Czech National Social Party	36,483	0.55	0
Party of Free Citizens	12,655	0.19	0
Folklor and Society	12,395	0.19	0
Freeholder Party of the Czech Republic	3,830	0.06	0
Right bloc	2,266	0.03	0
