= History of Brno =

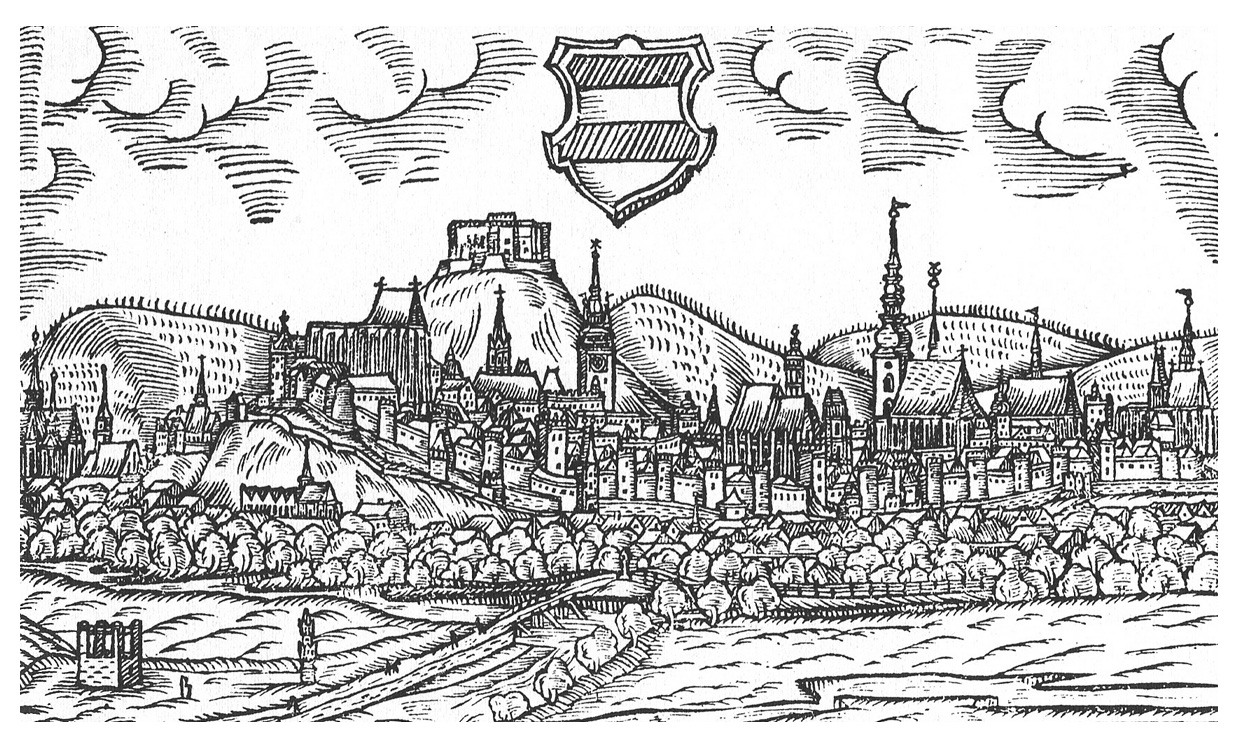
Brno in 1593

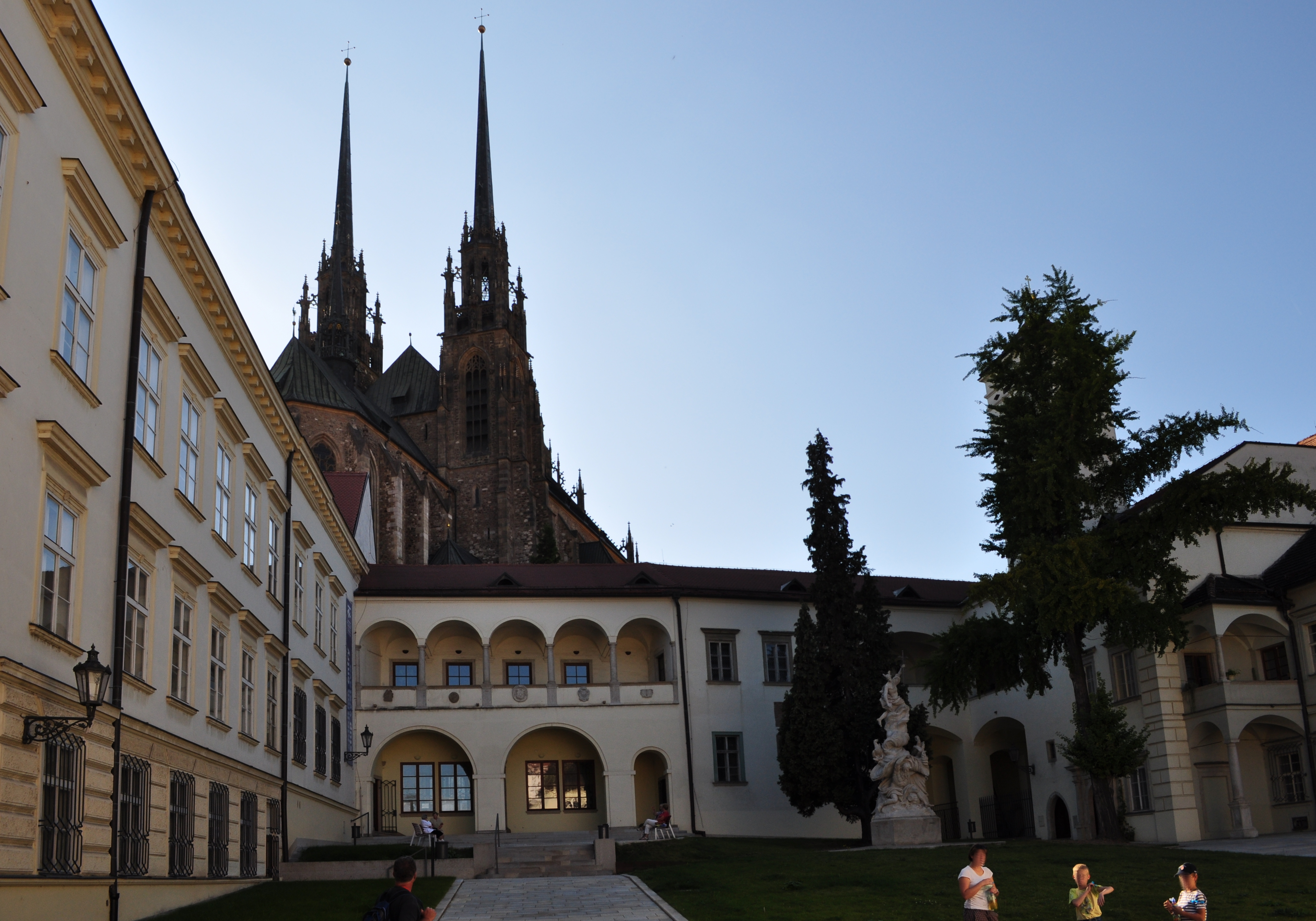
Bishop's Palace

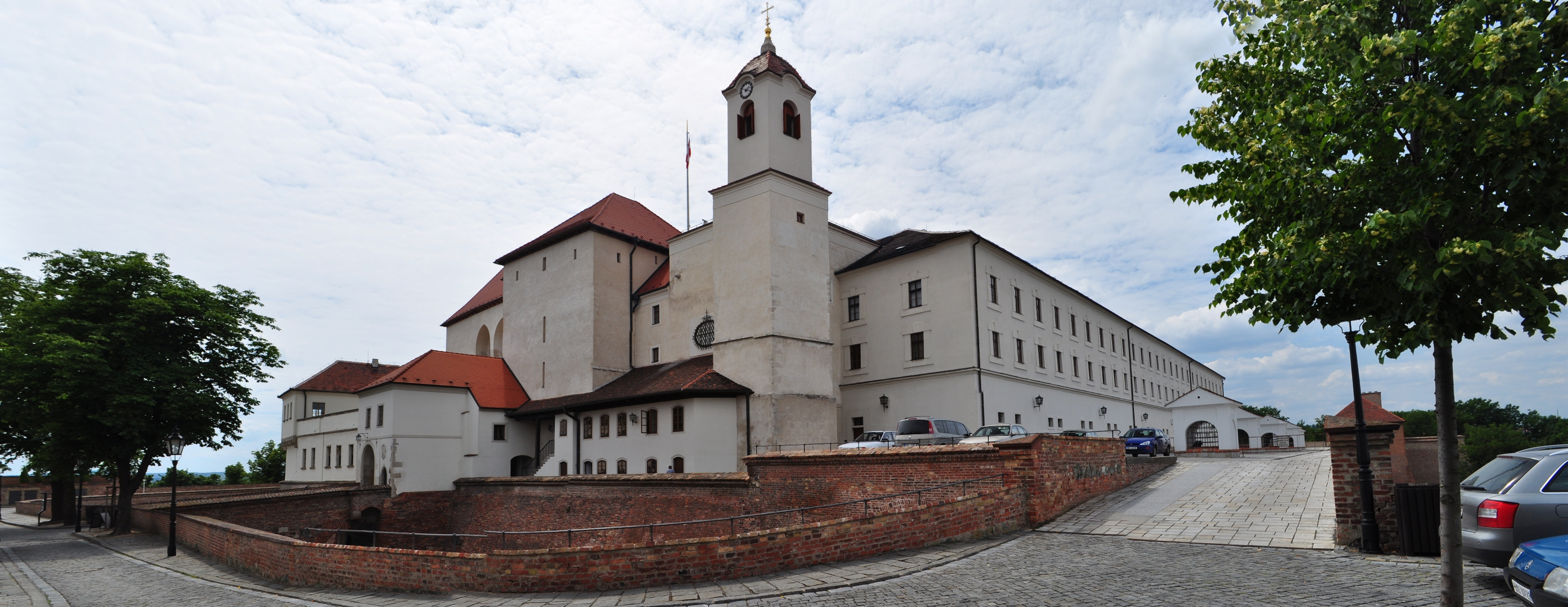
Špilberk Castle

Brno was recognised as a town in 1243 by Wenceslaus I, King of Bohemia, but the area had been settled since the 2nd century. It is mentioned in Ptolemy's atlas of Magna Germania as Eburodunum. From the 11th century, a castle of the governing Přemyslid dynasty stood here, and was the seat of the non-ruling prince.

During the 14th century, Brno became one of the centres for the Moravian regional assemblies, whose meetings alternated between Brno and Olomouc. These assemblies made political, legal, and financial decisions. They were also responsible for maintaining regional records.

During the Hussite Wars, the city remained faithful to Sigismund, Holy Roman Emperor. The Hussites twice laid siege to the city, once in 1428 and again in 1430, both times in vain.

During the Thirty Years' War, Brno was the only city to succeed in defending itself against two Swedish sieges, in 1643 and the longer one in 1645, thereby allowing the Austrian Empire to regroup its armies and to repel the Swedes. In recognition of its services, the city was rewarded with a renewal of its city privileges. In the years following the Thirty Years' War, the city became an impregnable Baroque fortress. In 1742, the Prussians vainly attempted to conquer the city, and the position of Brno was confirmed with the establishment of a bishopric in 1777. In 1805, the Battle of Austerlitz took place about 10 kilometers (6 miles) southeast of Brno.

In the 18th century, the development of industry and trade began, and continued into the next century. Soon after the Industrial Revolution, the town became one of the industrial centres of Moravia and the Austro-Hungarian Empire – sometimes referred to as the "Moravian Manchester". In 1839, the first train arrived in Brno. Together with the development of industry came the growth of the suburbs, and the city lost its fortifications, as did the Spielberg fortress, which became a notorious prison to which were sent not only criminals, but also political opponents of the Austrian Empire. Gas lighting was introduced to the city in 1847, and trams in 1869. Mahen Theatre in Brno was the first theatre building in Europe to use Edison's electric lamps. Thomas Edison then visited Brno in 1911 to see the theatre.

During the "First Republic" (1918–1938), Brno continued to grow in importance – Masaryk University was established (1919), the state armoury and automotive factory Československá státní zbrojovka Brno was established (1919), and the Brno Fairgrounds were opened in 1928 with an exhibition of contemporary culture. The city was not only a centre of industry and commerce, but also of education and culture (see the section on notable people from Brno).

In 1939, Brno was annexed by Nazi Germany along with the rest of Moravia and Bohemia. All Czech higher education institutions were closed down on 17 November, including four universities in Brno. 173 students were sent to Sachsenhausen concentration camp and Kounic's students residence was transformed into Gestapo headquarters and prison. Brno was liberated on 26 April 1945 by Red Army after more than two weeks of heavy fighting.

After the war, and the reestablishment of the Czechoslovak state, the majority of the ethnic German population (except antifascists, members of the resistance, mixed marriages, etc.) was expelled to Germany or Austria. The expulsion of some 20,000 Germans is referred to as the Brno death march.

== See also ==
- Timeline of Brno
- Other names of Brno
