= 2006 Brno municipal election =

- 20–21 October 2006

All 55 seats in the Assembly 28 seats needed for a majority
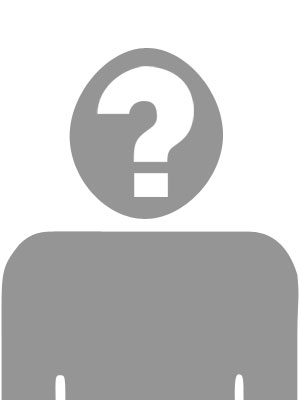

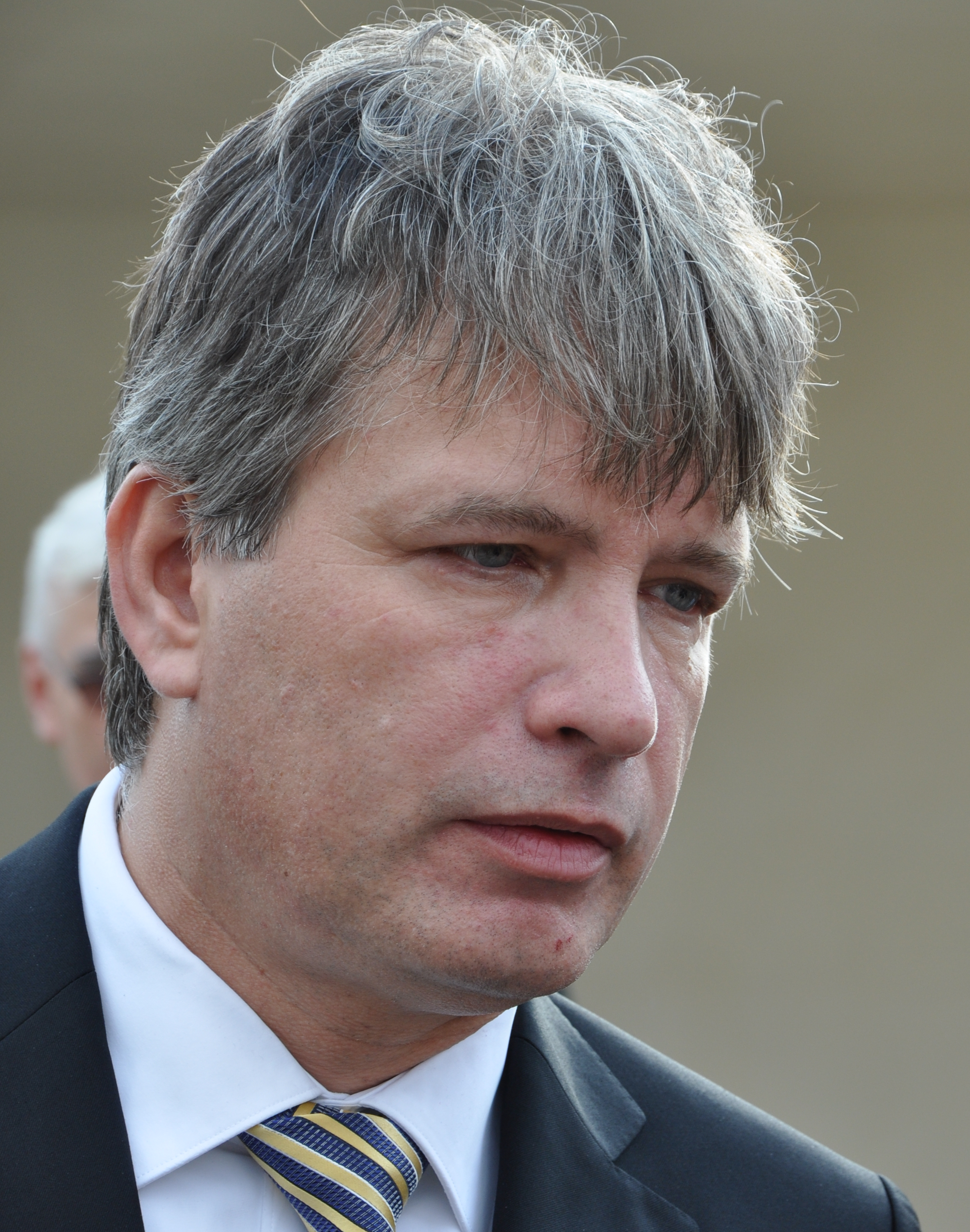

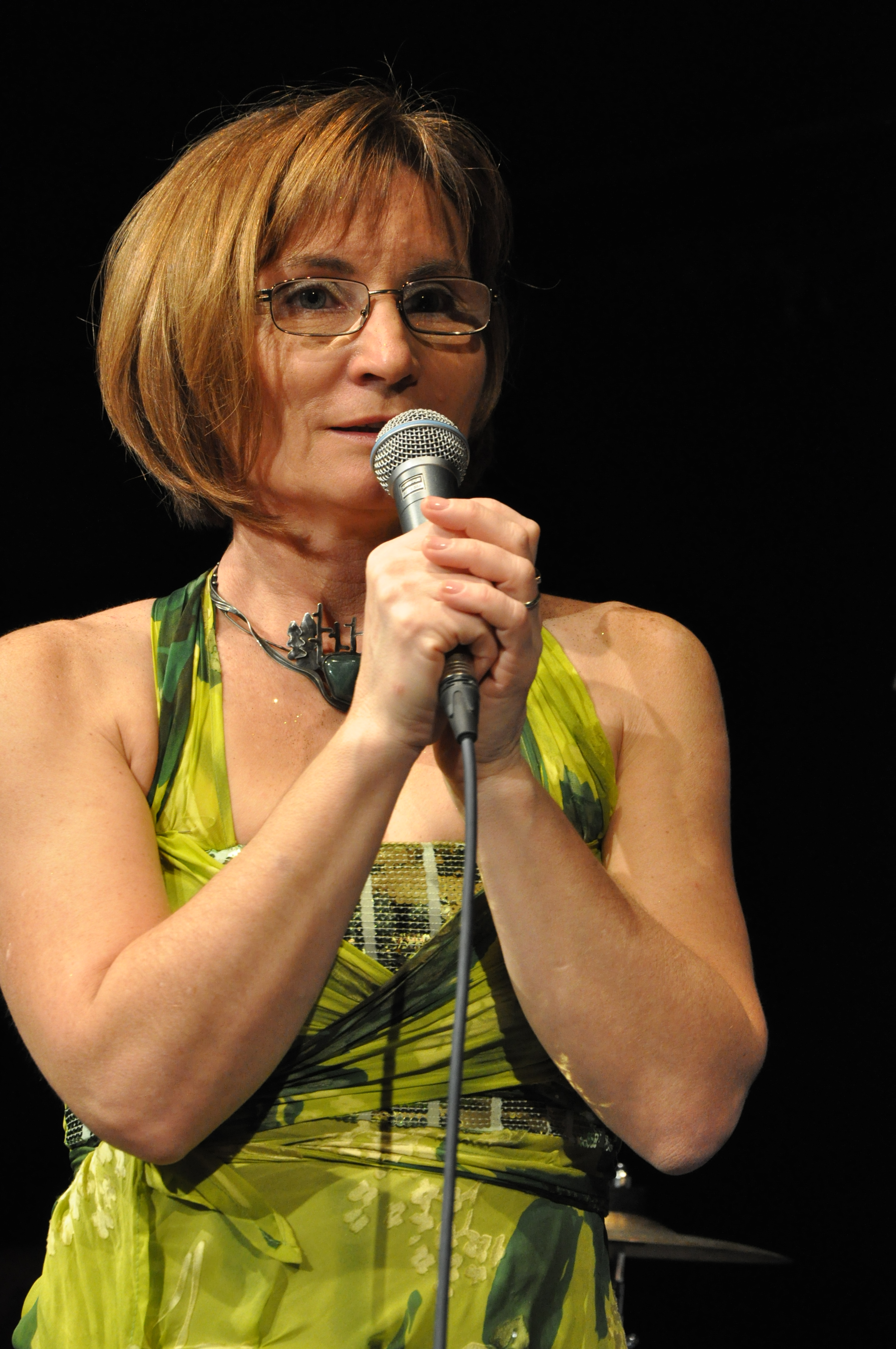

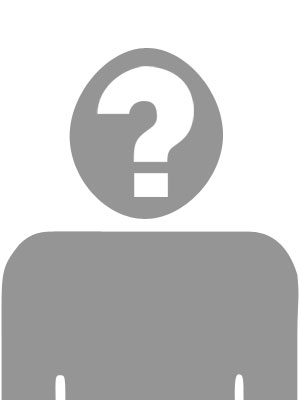

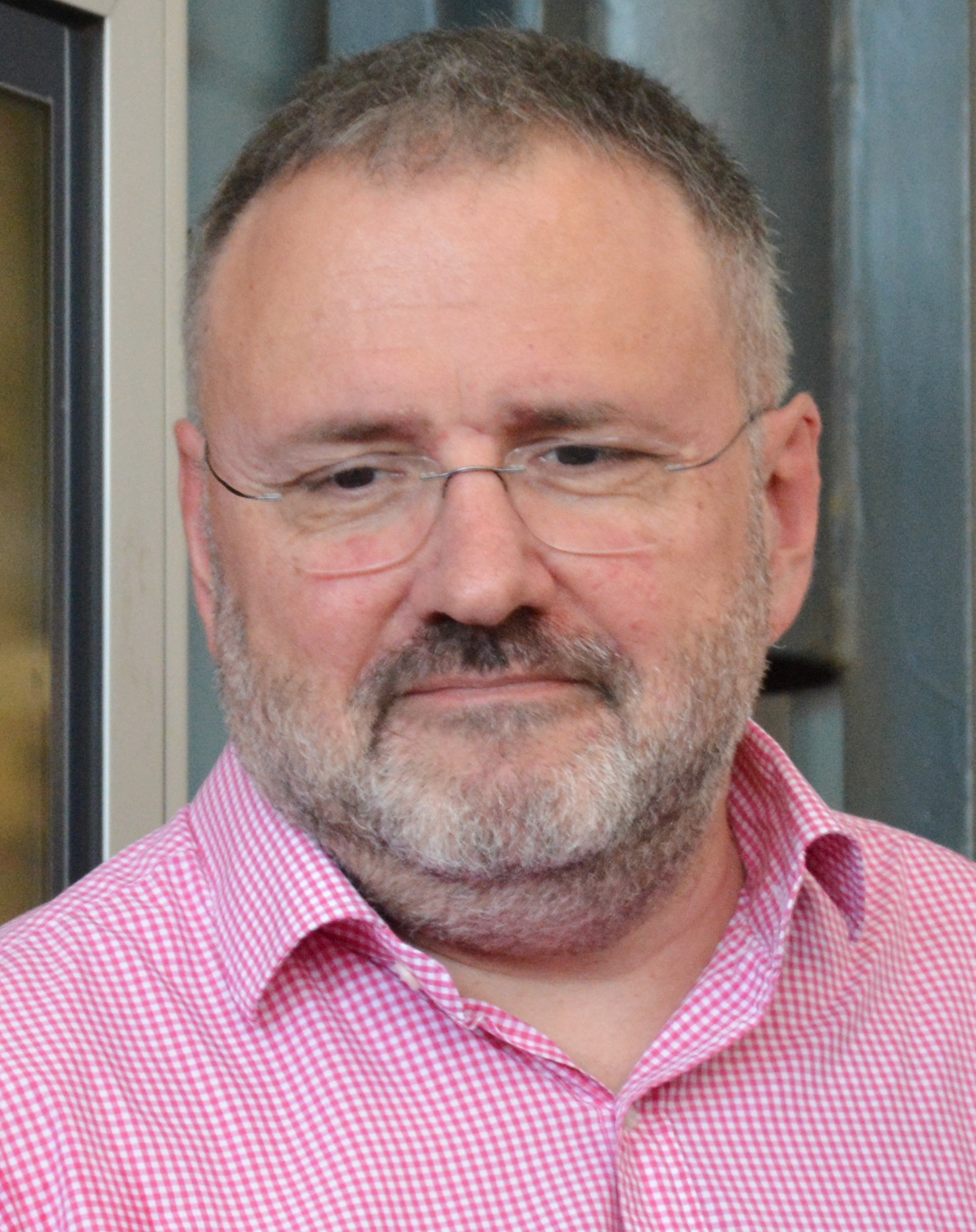

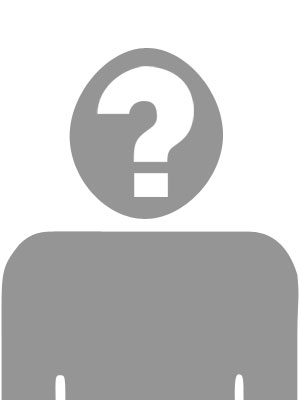
	First party	Second party	Third party
Leader	Karel Hledík	Roman Onderka	Jana Drápalová
Party	ODS	ČSSD	Greens
Seats won	19	13	7
Popular vote	2,159,341	1,419,646	777,695
Percentage	33.1%	21.8%	11.9%
	Fourth party	Fifth party	Sixth party
Leader	Barbora Javorová	Jiří Zlatuška	Pavel Březa
Party	Christian and Democratic Union – Czechoslovak People's Party	Brno2006	KSČM
Seats won	6	5	5
Popular vote	725,032	580,795	565,541
Percentage	11.1%	8.9%	8.7%
Mayor before election
Richard Svoboda
ODS
Elected mayor
Roman Onderka
ČSSD

Municipal election in Brno was held as part of Czech municipal elections in 2006. The Civic Democratic Party received highest number of votes but the Czech Social Democratic Party formed coalition and Roman Onderka became new Mayor.

== Results ==
Party	Votes	%	Seats
Civic Democratic Party	2,159,341	33.11	19
Czech Social Democratic Party	1,419,646	21.77	13
Green Party	777,695	11.92	7
Christian and Democratic Union – Czechoslovak People's Party	725,032	11.12	6
Brno 2006 - Jiří Zlatuška's Team	580,795	8.91	5
Communist Party of Bohemia and Moravia	565,541	8.67	5
Together for Brno	106,558	1.63	0
Independent Democrats	77,728	1.19	0
Moravané	54,344	0.83	0
Czech National Social Party	20,415	0.31	0
Folklor and Society	15,919	0.24	0
National Unity	6,707	0.10	0
Party of Democratic Socialism	3,393	0.05	0
Koruna Česká	3,377	0.05	0
Conservative Party	3,089	0.05	0
Equal Opportunities Party	2,327	0.04	0
