= Timeline of Prague =

The following is a timeline of the history of the city of Prague, Czech Republic.

== Prior to 16th century ==
- 870 CE – Prague Castle founded
- 10th C. - Vyšehrad (the "upper castle") is built.
  - Prague is one of the biggest slave markets in Europe as a center of the Prague slave trade.
- 973
  - St. George's Convent established in Prague Castle.
  - St. George's Basilica building expanded.
- 1085 – Coronation of Vratislaus II of Bohemia.
- 1172 – Judith Bridge built.
- 1235 – Wenceslaus I of Bohemia organised the building of a City wall.
- 1261 - Ottokar II of Bohemia crowned in Prague.
- 1270 – Great Synagogue built.
- 1344 – Catholic Archdiocese of Prague established.
- 1345 – University of Prague founded.
- 1347 - The black death killed millions.
- 1347 – 2 September: Coronation of Charles IV as King of Bohemia; Prague becomes capital of the Holy Roman Empire.
- 1348 – New Town founded outside Prague city walls.
- 1354 - Public clock installed (approximate date).
- 1363 – St. Wenceslas Chapel built
- 1370 – Tyn Church construction begins.
- 1386 – Karolinum rebuilt.
- 1391 – Bethlehem Chapel built.
- 1398 – Town Hall built in New Town.
- 1410 – Astronomical clock installed in City Hall.
- 1419 – Defenestration (political unrest).
- 1458 – Coronation of George of Poděbrady as King of Bohemia.
- 1475 – Powder Tower built.
- 1478 - Printing press in operation.
- 1483 - second Defenestration of Prague.

== 16th-18th centuries ==
- 1501 - Czech-language Protestant hymnal published.
- 1503 – Charles Bridge built.
- 1568 - High Synagogue (Prague) finished.
- 1580 - Loew reportedly invents the Golem of Prague.
- 1586 - Jewish Town Hall (Prague) constructed.
- 1590 - Maisel Synagogue construction begins.
- 1604 - October: Kepler observes a Milky Way supernova.
- 1618 – 23 May: 2nd Prague defenestration sparked off the Thirty Years' War.
- 1621 – 21 June: Execution of 27 Czech nobles on the Old Town Square as a consequence of the Battle of White Mountain.
- 1631 - Gustavus Adolphus, king of Sweden, briefly occupied the town.
- 1635 – 30 May: City hosts signing of the Peace of Prague (1635).
- 1648
  - West bank of Prague (including the Prague Castle) occupied and looted by Swedish armies.
  - Peace of Westphalia "put a stop to hostilities".
- 1650 – Column of the Virgin erected in Old Town Square.
- 1724 – Sporck theatre active.
- 1738 – Palais Sylva-Tarouca built on Na příkopě.
- 1739 – Kotzentheater active.
- 1741 – November: Occupation by French-Bavarian armies.
- 1742 – Siege of Prague (1742).
- 1744 – City occupied by Prussian forces.
- 1755 – St. Nicholas Church built.
- 1757 - 6 May: Siege of Prague.
- 1765 – Goltz Palace built.
- 1783 – Nostitz Theatre opens.
- 1784 – Administration of Hradčany, Malá Strana, New Town, and Old Town unified as one city.
- 1787
  - 19 January: Premiere of Mozart's Prague Symphony.
  - 29 October: Premiere of Mozart's opera Don Giovanni.
- 1791
  - 6 September: Coronation of Leopold II as King of Bohemia.
  - 6 September: Premiere of Mozart's La clemenza di Tito.
- 1796
  - Lithography invented.
  - Academy of Fine Arts and the Picture Gallery established.

== 19th century ==
- 1813 – July–October: City hosts meeting of the Coalition forces of the Napoleonic Wars.
- 1818 – Bohemian Museum founded.
- 1825 – Savings bank established.
- 1841 – Bridge of Francis I built.
- 1847 – Austrian National Bank branch opens.
- 1848
  - 2–12 June: Prague Slavic Congress, 1848 held.
  - 17 June: Revolutionary uprising near Prague crushed by imperial army.
  - Old Town Hall rebuilt.
- 1850
  - Josefov becomes part of city.
  - Statue of Francis I erected in the Franzensquai.
- 1851 - Prague City Archives established.
- 1857
  - Prager Eisenindustrie-Gesellschaft in business.
  - Industrial school established.
- 1862
  - Sokol sport club founded.
  - Provisional Theatre opens.
- 1866 – City hosts signing of the Peace of Prague (1866).
- 1868
  - Živnostenská banka (bank) founded.
  - Spanish Synagogue built.
- 1876 – Prager Tagblatt German-language newspaper begins publication.
- 1877 – Premiere of Dvořák's Symphonic Variations.
- 1879 – Anglo-Austrian Bank branch established.
- 1880 – Population: 293,822 metro.
- 1882 – Charles University reorganized into German- and Czech-language institutions.
- 1883
  - Vyšehrad becomes part of city.
  - Czech Theatre built.
  - National Theatre Ballet founded.
- 1884
  - Café Slavia opens.
  - Holešovice-Bubna becomes part of city.
  - Klausen Synagogue reconstructed.
- 1885
  - Rudolfinum (concert hall) inaugurated.
  - Museum of Decorative Arts founded.
- 1888 – Neues Deutsches Theater opens.
- 1890
  - 2 February: Premiere of Dvořák's Symphony No. 8.
  - September: Flood.
  - Population: 182,530.
- 1891
  - Petřín Lookout Tower and Bohemian Museum building constructed.
  - Hanavský Pavilion built in Letná Park.
  - General Land Centennial Exhibition (1891) held.
- 1896
  - Czech Philharmonic established.
  - Population: 189,157; metro 368,490.
- 1897 - Unrest.
- 1898
  - Bohemian Industrial Bank headquartered in city.
  - Civic museum opens on Poric Street.
- 1900
  - Old Prague Society founded.
  - Museum of Decorative Arts in Prague opened.

== 20th century ==
- 1901
  - Liben becomes part of city.
  - Francis Bridge built.
- 1905 - Unrest for "an extension of the suffrage".
- 1906
  - Prague-Velká Chuchle Racecourse opens.
  - Jewish Museum founded.
  - Population: 460,849 metro.
- 1907 – Vinohrady Theatre inaugurated.
- 1908
  - May–June: City hosts Prague 1908 chess tournament.
  - 19 September: Premiere of Mahler's Symphony No. 7.
- 1909 - Smíchov becomes part of Prague.
- 1910 - Population: 223,741.
- 1911 – St.-Antonius-von-Padua-Kirche (church) built on Bubenská-Platz.
- 1916 – May: City premiere of Janáček's Jenůfa.
- 1918
  - Kino Světozor (cinema) opens.
  - October: City becomes capital of Czechoslovakia.
- 1921 – Communist Party of Czechoslovakia headquartered in city.
- 1922
  - Great Prague created by uniting Prague with its suburbs and neighboring towns; 37 municipalities added.
  - Vinohrady and Žižkov become part of Prague.
  - Population: 676,000.
- 1930 – Population: 848,823.
- 1931 – Prague Zoo opens.
- 1934 - Prague Symphony Orchestra founded.
- 1937 - Prague Ruzyně International Airport began operations.
- 1939
  - March: Nazi German occupation of city begins.
  - City becomes seat of German Protectorate of Bohemia and Moravia.
- 1942 – 27 May: German official Reinhard Heydrich assassinated; Nazis respond with wave of terror.
- 1945
  - 14 February: Bombing of Prague in World War II.
  - 5–8 May: Prague uprising against the Nazi German occupants during the last days of World War II.
  - 6–11 May: Prague Offensive: arrival of the Red Army; Nazi German occupation ends.
  - Expulsion of German citizens
  - Academy of Performing Arts in Prague established.
- 1946
  - Prague Spring International Music Festival begins.
  - Faculty of Theatre established.
- 1948
  - February: 1948 Czechoslovak coup d'état.
  - May: City hosts The Second International Congress of Composers and Music Critics 1948.
- 1952
  - Slánský trial.
  - Prague Radio Symphony Orchestra active.
- 1954 – Bethlehem Chapel reconstructed.
- 1958 – Theatre on the Balustrade founded.
- 1955 – Stalin Monument unveiled at Letná Park.
- 1957 – Reduta Jazz Club opens on Národní.
- 1962 - Stalin Monument destroyed.
- 1964 – Prague Ballet active.
- 1968 – Prague Spring; Soviet crackdown.
- 1969
  - Jan Palach's self-immolation.
  - City becomes capital of the Czech Socialist Republic.
- 1970 – Prague Chamber Ballet founded.
- 1973 – 11 December: City hosts signing of the Treaty of Prague (1973).
- 1974
  - Prague Metro founded.
  - Population: 1,095,615.
- 1978 – Charles Bridge pedestrianized.
- 1985 - Population: 1,190,576 (estimate).
- 1989 – November–December: Velvet Revolution.
- 1990 – City divided into 56 districts.
- 1991
  - School of International Relations, University of Economics in Prague established.
  - Prager Zeitung German-language newspaper begins publication.
  - Prague Metronome erected.
- 1992
  - Žižkov Television Tower erected.
  - Academy of Sciences of the Czech Republic headquartered in city.
- 1993 – 1 January: Prague becomes capital of the Czech Republic.
- 1995 – U.S. Radio Free Europe/Radio Liberty headquartered in city.
- 1996
  - City hosts World Congress of Esperanto; manifesto drafted.
  - Dancing House built.
- 1997 – Via Foundation headquartered in city.
- 1998 – University of New York in Prague established.
- 1999 - Prague Mosque built.

== 21st century ==
- 2001 – Prague Fringe Festival begins.
- 2002
  - August: Prague suffers from flooding, parts of the city evacuated, many historic archives damaged but no major landmarks destroyed.
  - Broadway Theatre (Prague) opens.
  - Prague Security Studies Institute established.
  - November: City hosts NATO summit.
- 2007 – The Codex Gigas returns to Prague after 379 years
- 2008 - Prague Declaration.
- 2009 – 5 April: U.S. president gives speech on nuclear disarmament.
- 2010 – September: Economic protest.
- 2011 – Population: 1,262,106; metro 2,300,000.
- 2013
  - 29 April: 2013 Prague explosion.
  - Tomáš Hudeček becomes mayor.
- 2014 Adriana Krnáčová becomes mayor.

== See also ==
- History of Prague
- List of mayors of Prague
- List of rulers of Bohemia, 9th-20th century, official residence in Prague
- Timelines of other cities in the Czech Republic: Brno

== Bibliography ==
=== in English ===
- Abraham Rees (1819), "Prague", The Cyclopaedia, London: Longman, Hurst, Rees, Orme & Brown
- David Brewster, ed. (1830). "Prague". Edinburgh Encyclopaedia. Edinburgh: William Blackwood.
- Charles Knight, ed. (1866). "Prague". Geography. English Cyclopaedia. Vol. 4. London: Bradbury, Evans, & Co. hdl:2027/nyp.33433000064810.
- David Kay (1880), "Principal Towns: Prague", Austria-Hungary, Foreign Countries and British Colonies, London: Sampson Low, Marston, Searle, & Rivington, hdl:2027/mdp.39015030647005
- "Prague", Bradshaw's Illustrated Hand-book to Germany and Austria, London: W.J. Adams & Sons, 1896
- Norddeutscher Lloyd (1896), "Prague", Guide through Germany, Austria-Hungary, Italy, Switzerland, France, Belgium, Holland and England, Berlin: J. Reichmann & Cantor, OCLC 8395555
- "Prague". Chambers's Encyclopaedia. London: Chambers. 1901.
- Francis Lützow (1902), Prague, Mediaeval Towns, London: J.M. Dent & Co., OCLC 150311124
- "Prague". Handbook for Travellers in South Germany and Austria (15th ed.). London: J. Murray. 1903.
- "Prague", Jewish Encyclopedia, vol. 10, New York: Funk & Wagnalls, 1907, hdl:2027/osu.32435029752854
- Lützow, Count František (1910). "Prague" . Encyclopædia Britannica. Vol. 22 (11th ed.). pp. 248–250.
- Benjamin Vincent (1910), "Prague", Haydn's Dictionary of Dates (25th ed.), London: Ward, Lock & Co.
- "Prague", Austria-Hungary (11th ed.), Leipzig: Karl Baedeker, 1911
- Geoffrey Moorhouse (1980), Prague, Great Cities, Time-Life Books, OL 20601092M
- Rob Humphreys (1992), Prague, London: Rough Guides, OL 24217161M
- Prague City Guide, Lonely Planet, 1994, OL 8314510M
- Agata Anna Lisiak (2010). Urban Cultures in (Post)colonial Central Europe. Purdue University Press. ISBN 978-1-55753-573-3. (about Berlin, Budapest, Prague, Warsaw)

=== in Czech ===
- Edvard Herold (1884). Malebné cesty po Praze [Picturesque Walks through Prague] (in Czech). Praze: Tiskem a nákladem E. Grégra. v.2, Malá Strana, 1896
- Václav Vladivoj Tomek [in Czech] (1892), Dějepis města Prahy [History of the Town of Prague], Prague. Naródní Museum / Spisy (in Czech), V Praze: Nákl. knihkupectví Fr. Řivnáče
- Jan Dolenský (1903), Praha ve své sláv i utrpení [Prague in Good Times and Bad] (in Czech), V Praze: Nakladatel B. Kocí, OL 23326708M

=== in German ===
- "Prag". Topographia Bohemiae, Moraviae et Silesiae. Topographia Germaniae (in German). Bärenreiter-Verlag. 1650.
- "Prag", Wien [Vienna ... and parts of Austria-Hungary], Meyers Reisebücher (in German), Hildburghausen: Bibliographisches Institut, 1873
- Statistická Komise, Prague (1900). Statistisches Handbuch der königlichen Hauptstadt Prague ... 1897 [Statistical Handbook for the City of Prague ... 1897] (in German). Prag.
- O. Klauber, ed. (1902). Prag und Umgebungen [Prague and Surroundings] (in German) (12th ed.). Berlin: Albert Goldschmidt.
