= Petr Duchoň =

Czech politician

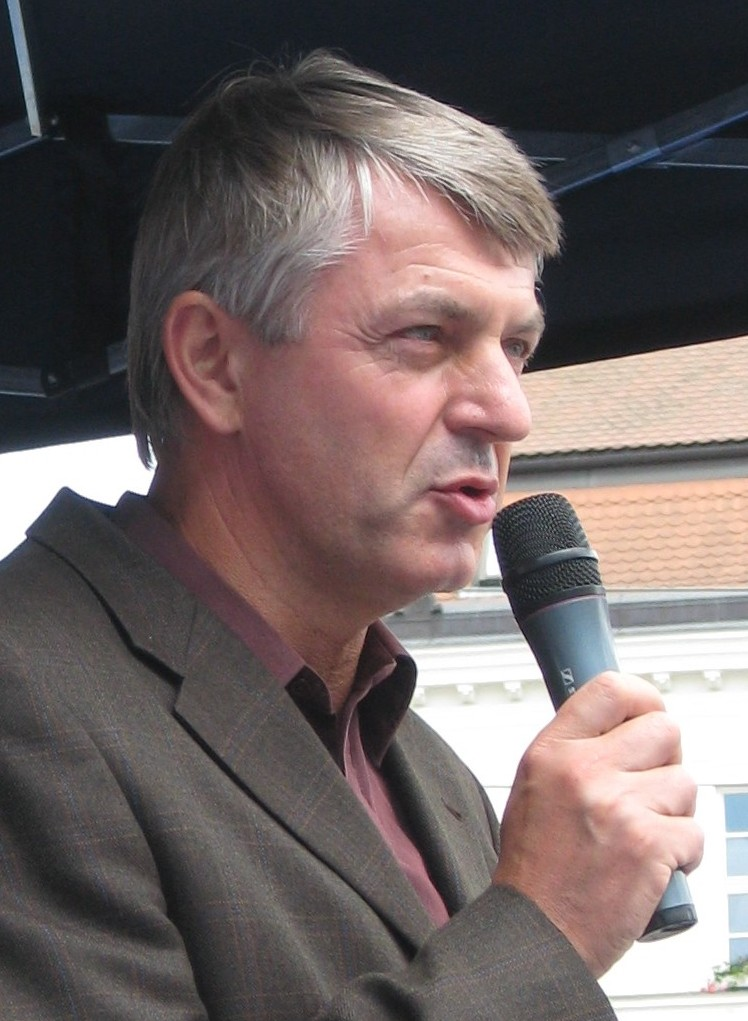
Petr Duchoň (2009)

Petr Duchoň (born 6 September 1956 in Brno) is a Czech politician and Member of the European Parliament with the Civic Democratic Party, part of the European Democrats and is vice-chair of the European Parliament's Committee on Budgetary Control and its Committee on Transport and Tourism.

He is a substitute for the Committee on Economic and Monetary Affairs and a member of the Delegation for Relations with the United States. Eisenhower Fellowships selected Petr Duchoň in 2001 to represent the Czech Republic.

== Education ==
- Studied physics at Masaryk University (Brno)
- Completed postgraduate studies in vacuum technology at the Czech Technical University, Prague, and a period of study in Heidelberg

== Career ==
- Electron lithography research engineer, coherent electron beam source designer
- Began political career as Deputy Mayor of the metropolitan district of Brno Bystrc
- Was later elected to the city council representing ODS (Civic Democratic Party)
- 1998–2004: Lord Mayor of Brno
- Participation in a number of study visits concerning local autonomous authorities
- Fellow of the Eisenhower Foundation

== See also ==
- 2004 European Parliament election in the Czech Republic
