= Names of European cities in different languages (B) =

Different names for European cities in neighbouring languages

The names used for some major European cities differ in different European and sometimes non-European languages. In some countries where there are two or more languages spoken, such as Belgium or Switzerland, dual forms may be used within the city itself, for example on signage. This is also the case in Ireland, despite a low level of actual usage of the Irish language. In other cases where a regional language is officially recognised, that form of the name may be used in the region, but not nationally. Examples include the Welsh language in Wales in the United Kingdom, and parts of Italy and Spain.

There is a slow trend to return to the local name, which has been going on for a long time. In English Livorno is now used, the old English form of Leghorn having become antiquated at least a century ago. In some cases, such as the replacement of Danzig with Gdańsk, the official name has been changed more recently. Since 1995, the government of Ukraine has encouraged the use of Kyiv rather than Kiev.

English name	Other names or former names
(Netherlands) Baarn	Baarn (Dutch*), Baoren (Low Saxon*), Barnas (Lithuanian)
(Romania) Bacău	Bacău (Romanian*), Bakau – Бакау (Macedonian, Serbian*), Bakau - Бакъу (Bulgarian*), Bak'eu – ბაკეუ (Georgian*), Bakeu – Бакэу (Russian*), Bákó (Hungarian*), Bakau (German*), Baka (Turkish*), Bacovia (Latin*)
(Romania) Baia Mare	Baia Mare (Estonian, Romanian*), Baja Mare – Баја Маре (Macedonian*, Serbian*), Baya Mare - Бая Маре (Bulgarian*), Frauenbach (German*), Nagybánya (Hungarian*), Neustadt (rarer German*), Rivulus Dominarum or Rivuli Puellarum (Latin*)
(France) Bailleul	Bailleul (French*), Belle (Dutch*)
(Ukraine) / (Autonomous Republic of Crimea) Bakhchysarai	Bachtschyssaraj (German*), Bağçasaray (Azeri*, Crimean Tatar*), Bahçesaray (Turkish*), Bahcisarai (Romanian*), Bahchisaray - Бахчисарай (Bulgarian*), Bahčisaraj – Бахчисарај (Macedonian*, Serbian), Baheuchisarai / Pahŭch'isarai – 바흐치사라이 (Korean*), Bahtšisarai (Estonian, Finnish), Bakczysaraj (Polish*), Bakhchisaray – Бахчисарай (Russian*), Bakhchysarai – Бахчисарай (Ukrainian*)
(Hungary) Balassagyarmat	Balassagyarmat (Hungarian*), Balážske Ďarmoty (Slovak*), Ďarmoty (Czech*), Jahrmarkt (German)
(Slovakia) Bánovce nad Bebravou	Bán (Hungarian*), Bánovce nad Bebravou (Slovak*) Bānovce pie Bebravas (Latvian*) Banovcė prie Bebravo (Lithuanian*), Banowitz (German*)
(United Kingdom) (Wales) Bangor	Bangor (Welsh*)
(Slovakia) Banská Bystrica	Banska Bistrica (Latvian*, Lithuanian*, Slovenian*), Banska Bistrica – Банска Бистрица (Serbian*, Macedonian*), Banska Bistritsa (Azerbaijani*), Banska-bistritsa (Uzbek*) Banska Bistritsa - Банска Бистрица (Bulgarian*), Banská Bystrica (Slovak*, Czech*), Banska-Bystrika (Turkmen*) Bańska Bystrzyca (Polish*), Besztercebánya (Hungarian*), Neosolium (Latin), Neusohl (German*), Novizolii Bistriciensis (alternative Latin), Villa Nova Bystrice (alternative Latin)
(Slovakia) Banská Štiavnica	Banska Štiavnica (Lithuanian*), Banská Štiavnica (Slovak*), Banska Štijavnica – Банска Штијавница (Macedonian*), Banska Štjavnica (Latvian*) Banska Štjavnjica – Банска Штјавњица (Serbian*), Banska Ştyavnisa (Azerbaijani*), Bańska Szczawnica (Polish*), Schemnitz (German*), Selmecbánya (Hungarian*)
(Montenegro) Bar	Antivari (Italian*), Bar (Croatian*, Finnish*, Romanian*), Bar – Бар (Bulgarian*, Macedonian*, Serbian*), Tivar (Albanian*), Antibarium (Latin*)
(Spain) Barcelona	Barcellona (Italian*), Barċellona (Maltese), Barcelona (Catalan*, Croatian*, Dutch*, Estonian*, Finnish*, Galician*, Hungarian*, Norwegian*, Occitan*, Polish*, Portuguese*, Romanian*, Slovene*, Spanish*, Swedish*), Barcelona – بارسلونا (Urdu*), Barcelone (French*, Friulian), Barcino (Latin*), Bårçulone (Walloon), Bareusellona / Parŭsellona – 바르셀로나 (Korean*), Barna (Catalan abbreviation), Barselona – Բարսելոնա (Armenian), Barselona (Azeri*, Ladino*, Latvian*, Lithuanian*, Tagalog*, Turkish*), Barselona – Барселона (Bulgarian*, Macedonian*, Russian*, Serbian*, Ukrainian*), Barselona – বার্সেলোনা (Bengali), Barselona – ბარსელონა (Georgian*), Bartzelona (Basque*), Barts'lóna – ברצלונה (Hebrew*), Baruserona – バルセロナ (Japanese*), Bāsàiluónà – 巴塞羅那 (Chinese*), Varkelóni – Βαρκελώνη (Greek*)
(Slovakia) Bardejov	Bardejov (Slovak, Czech), Bardejova (Latvian*), Bardejovas (Lithuanian*), Bardejów (Polish), Bártfa (Hungarian), Bartfeld (German), Bartpha (Latin), Bardejov - Бардеёв (Rusyn*), Bаrdеyоv (Azerbaijani*), Bardiyiv - Бардіїв (Ukrainian*)
(Switzerland) Basel	Bâla (Arpitan*), Bajel / Pajel – 바젤 (Korean*), Bâle (French*), Bāsài'ěr – 巴塞爾 (Chinese*), Basel (Croatian*, Estonian*, Finnish*, German*, Romanian*, Swedish*, Turkish*), Basilea (Catalan*, Italian*, Romansh*, Spanish*), Basileia (Portuguese*), Basilej (Czech*), Basilia (Latin*), Basle (variant in English*), Bazel (Azeri*, Dutch*), Bazel- Բազել (Armenian*), Bazel – בזל (Hebrew*), Bázel (Hungarian*), Bazel – Базел (Macedonian*, Serbian*), Bazel' – Базель (Russian*, Ukrainian*), Bāzele (Latvian*), Bazeli – ბაზელი (Georgian*), Bazelis (Lithuanian*), Bāzeru – バーゼル (Japanese*), Bāzil – بازل (Arabic), Bazilej (Slovak*), Bazylea (Polish*), Buslaraborg (Icelandic), Vasilía – Βασιλεία (Greek*)
(France) Bastia	Bastìa (Corsican*, Finnish*), Bastia (Dutch*, French*, German*, Italian*), Bastija – Бастија (Macedonian*, Serbian)
(Belgium) Bastogne	Baaschtnech or Baastnech (Luxembourgish*), Bāsītuōniè – 巴斯托涅 (Chinese*), Bastenaken (Dutch*), Bastnach (German*), Bastogne (French*, Finnish*, Italian*, Romanian*), Bastonacum (Latin), Bastonj – Бастоњ (Macedonian*, Serbian), Bastoña (Spanish*)
(United Kingdom) (England) Bath	Aquae Sulis (Latin*), Baðan, Baðanceaster*, Baðon or Baðum (Anglo-Saxon), Bāsī – 巴斯 (Chinese*), Baseu / Pasŭ – 바스 (Korean*), Bat – Бат (Macedonian, Serbian), Caerfaddon (Welsh*)
(Germany) Bautzen	Baucen – Бауцен (Macedonian*), Bautzen (Dutch, Estonian, French, German), Budišin – Будишин (Serbian*), Budisse (French, old), Budyšín (Czech*, Slovak*), Budyšin (Upper Sorbian), Budyšyn (Lower Sorbian), Budziszyn (Polish*)
(Belgium) Beaumont	Beaumont (French*), Bellomontium (Latin), Biômont (Picard*, Walloon*)
(Belgium) Beauraing	Beauraing (French*), Biarin (Walloon*), Bōran – ボーラン (Japanese), Boren – Борен (Bulgarian*, Macedonian, Russian*, Ukrainian)
(Hungary) Békéscsaba	Békéscsaba (Hungarian*), Békešská Čaba (Slovak*), Bichișciaba (Romanian*), Tschabe (German)
(Poland) Będzin	Będzin (Polish*), Bendin – Бендин (Russian*), Bendin – בענדין (Yiddish*), Bendzin (German*), Bendzin – Бенѕин (Macedonian*), Bendzin – Бендзин (Serbian*)
(Serbia) Bela Crkva	Aktabya (Turkish), Bela Crkva – Бела Црква (Macedonian*, Serbian*), Biała Cerkiew (Polish*), Bílá Cerekev (Czech*), Biserica Albă (Romanian*), Fehértemplom (Hungarian*, Weißkirchen (German*)
(United Kingdom) Belfast	Béal Feirste (Irish*), Beeal Feirshtey (Manx*), Bèi'ěrfǎsītè – 貝爾法斯特 (Chinese*), Belfast (Albanian, Azeri*, Croatian*, Estonian*, Finnish*, French*, Italian*, Maltese, Romanian*, Spanish*, Turkish*), Belfast – Белфаст (Macedonian*, Serbian*), Belfast – בלפסט (Hebrew*), Belfast- بلفاسث (Urdu), Belfāsta (Latvian*), Belfastas (Lithuanian*), Belfaste (Portuguese, alternative*), Belfastium (Latin*), Belffast (Welsh*), Belpas (Tagalog*), Belpaseuteu / Pelp'asŭtŭ – 벨파스트 (Korean*), Belpast'i – ბელფასტი (Georgian*), Berufasuto – ベルファスト (Japanese*), Beul Feirste (Scottish Gaelic*), Bilfawst (Ulster Scots*)
(France) Belfort	Befert (old German*), Beffert (German*), Belfor – Белфор (Serbian*), Belfort (Dutch*, Estonian, French*, German), Belfort – Белфорт (Macedonian*), Belfortium (Latin*)
(Serbia) Belgrade	Béalgrád (Irish*), Bèi'ěrgéláidé – 貝爾格萊德 (Chinese*), Bělehrad (Czech*), Belehrad (Slovak*), Belgrad -Բելգրադ (Armenian*), Belgrad – Белград (Bulgarian*, Macedonian*, Russian*), Belgrad (Catalan*, Estonian*, Finnish*, German*, Maltese, Polish*, Romanian*, Swedish*, Turkish*), Belgrad – בלגרד (Hebrew*), Belgrád (contemporary Hungarian*), Belgrada (Latvian*), Belgradas (Lithuanian*), Belgrade (French*), Belgråde (Walloon*), Belgradi – ბელგრადი (Georgian*), Belgrado (Dutch*, Italian*, Portuguese*, Spanish*), Bèlgrado (Arpitan*), Belhrad (Ukrainian*), Beligrad (old Slovene), Beogeuradeu / Peogŭradŭ – 베오그라드 (Korean*), Beograd (Albanian*, Croatian*, Danish*, Norwegian *, Scottish Gaelic, Slovene*), Beograd – Београд (Serbian*), Beogurādo – ベオグラード (Japanese*), Bilġrād (Arabic), Griechisch-Weißenburg (old German, rare*), Lándorfejérvár (old Hungarian*), Nándorfehérvár (Hungarian* former name), Belogradum (Latin*), Veligrádhi – Βελιγράδι (Greek*)
(Switzerland) Bellinzona	Belincona – Белинцона (Macedonian*, Serbian*), Belinçona (Arpitan*), Bellenz (old Swiss German name), Bellinzona (Dutch*, German*, Italian*, Polish*, Romanian*, Swedish*), Bellinzone (French*), Bilitio (Latin*), Blizuna (Romansh), Bellence (old French)
(Albania) Berat	Albánský Bělehrad (Czech*), Berat / Berati (Albanian*), Berat – Берат or Belgrad – Белград (Macedonian*, Serbian), Beráti – Μπεράτι (Greek*), Belgrad-ı-Arnavut (Ottoman Turkish*), Belogradum Albaniae (Latin*)
(Ukraine) Berdychiv	Barditshev – באַרדיטשעװ (Yiddish*), Berdičev – Бердичев (Macedonian, Serbian), Berdicev (Romanian*), Berdichev – Бердичев (Russian*), Berdõtšiv' (Estonian), Berdychiv – Бердичів (Ukrainian*), Berdyczów (Polish*)
(Italy) Bergamo	Bergamo (Italian*), Bergame (French*), Wälsch-Bergen (old German, rare), Bèrghem (Eastern Lombard*), Bergomum (Latin*)
(Norway) Bergen	Bēi'ěrgēn – 卑爾根 (Chinese*), Beirbhe na Tuathroinn (archaic Scottish Gaelic), Berga (Latin*, Portuguese*), Bergen (Azeri*, Danish*, Dutch*, Estonian*, German*, Finnish*, Norwegian*, Romanian*, Swedish*, Turkish*), Bergen – Берген (Macedonian, Serbian*), Bergena (Latvian*), Bergenas (Lithuanian*), Bergeni – ბერგენი (Georgian*), Bergun (Pite Sami), Birgon (Northern Sami*), Björgvin (Icelandic*), Bjørgvin (archaic Norwegian, former old Norse name), Peruna (Kven)
(Netherlands) Bergen op Zoom	Bergae ad Zomam (Latin*), Bergen op Zoom (Dutch*), Bergenas (Lithuanian), Bergn ip Zoom (West Flemish*), Berg-op-Zoom (French*), Bergues-sur-le-Zon (archaic French), Berrehe op Zoom (Zeelandic*)
(Netherlands) Bergeijk	Bergeijk (Dutch*), Bergeikas (Lithuanian)
(Belgium) Beringen	Beringen (Dutch*), Beringenas (Lithuanian*), Béringue (French*), Berringe (Limburgish*)
(Germany) Berlin	Barlīn (Arabic), Barliń (Lower Sorbian), Barlin – برلن (Urdu*), Beirlín (Irish*), Bereullin / Perŭllin – 베를린 (Korean*), Berlien (Gronings), Berliin (Estonian*), Berliini (Finnish*), Berlijn (Dutch*), Berlim (Portuguese*), Berlín (Galician*, Czech*, Icelandic*, Slovak*, Spanish*), Berlin – Բեռլին (Armenian*), Berlin (Azeri*, Croatian*, Danish*, French*, German*, Hungarian*, Interlingua, Maltese, Norwegian*, Polish*, Romanian*, Slovene*, Swedish*, Tagalog*, Turkish*, Walloon*), Berlin – ברלין (Hebrew*), Berlin – Берлин (Macedonian, Serbian*), Berlin – בערלין (Yiddish*), Bèrlin (Arpitan*), Berlīne (Latvian*), Berlini – ბერლინი (Georgian*), Berlino (Italian*, Esperanto*), Berlyn (Afrikaans*, West Frisian*), Berlynas (Lithuanian*), Berurin – ベルリン (Japanese*), Bólín – 柏林 (Chinese*), Verolíno – Βερολίνο (Greek*), Berolinum (Latin*)
(Netherlands) Berltsum	Berlikum (Dutch*), Berltsum (Western Frisian*)
(Switzerland) Bern	Bann (Pennsylvania German*), Bärn (Alemannic German*), Bèrna (Franco-Provençal*), Bereun / Perŭn – 베른 (Korean*), Bern – Բեռն (Armenian*), Bern (Azeri*, Croatian*, Czech*, Danish*, Dutch*, Estonian*, Finnish*, German*, Hungarian*, Slovak*, Slovene*, Swedish*, Turkish*), Bern – Берн (Macedonian*, Russian*, Serbian*, Ukrainian*), Bern – برن (Persian), Bern – برن (Urdu*), Berna (Catalan*, Friulian*, Italian*, Latin*, Maltese, Portuguese*, Romanian*, Romansh*, Spanish*), Bèrna (Arpitan*), Bernas (Lithuanian*), Berne (French*, Latvian*), Berni – ბერნი (Georgian*), Berno (Polish*), Berun – ベルン (Japanese*), Bó'ēn – 伯恩 (Chinese*), Vérni – Βέρνη (Greek*)
(United Kingdom) (England) Berwick-upon-Tweed	Abaruig (Scottish Gaelic, obsolete), Bearaig-a-Deas (Scottish Gaelic*), Berwig (Welsh), Caerferwig (Welsh*), Sooth Berwick or Sou Berick* (Scots), Tèwēidéhé shàngde Bówēikè - 特威德河上的伯威克 (Mandarin)
(France) Besançon	Bèisāngsōng – 貝桑松 (Chinese*), Besançon (Catalan, Dutch*, Estonian, Finnish*, French*, German, Romanian*, Turkish*), Besanzón (Spanish*), Besanzone (Italian), Bezanson – Безансон (Macedonian*, Serbian), Bisanz (old German*), Vesontio (Latin*)
(Netherlands) Beverwijk	Beverveikas (Lithuanian*), Beverwiek (Low Saxon*), Beverwijk (Dutch*), Beverwyk (Western Frisian*)
(Poland) Białowieża	Bělověž (Czech*), Beloveža (Latvian*), Białowieża (Estonian, Polish*), Biełavieža – Белавежа (Belarusian*), Biloveža – Біловежа (Ukrainian*), Bjalovježa – Бјаловјежа (Macedonian, Serbian)
(Poland) Białystok	Balstogė (Lithuanian*), Byelostok – Белосток (Russian*), Belostoka (Latvian*), Bělostok (Czech), Bjalistok – Бјалисток (Macedonian*, Serbian), Bjalistoko (Esperanto*), Bjołystok (Silesian*), Białystok (English, Estonian, Polish*), Bielostok (old Slovak), Biełastok – Беласток (Belarusian*), Bilostok – Білосток (Ukrainian*), Byalistok – ביאַליסטאָק (Yiddish*), Bǐyàwéisītuōkè - 比亚维斯托克/比亞維斯托克 (Mandarin)
(Switzerland) Biel/Bienne	Belna (Latin*), Biel (Estonian, German*, Biu (Bernese German), Finnish*), Bienne (French*), Bil – Бил (Macedonian*), Bil/Bjen – Бил/Бјен (Serbian*), Bienna (Italian*, Romansh*)
(Italy) Biella	Biella (Italian*), Bjela – Бјела (Serbian*), Bugella (Latin*), Biela – Биела (Macedonian*), Biela (Piedmontese*)
(Poland) Bielsko-Biała	Beļsko-Bjala (Latvian*), Bielitz-Biala (German*), Bielsko-Biała (Polish*), Bílsko-Bělá (Czech*), Bjelsko Bjala – Бјелско Бјала (Macedonian, Serbian), Byerusuko-Byawa – ビェルスコ=ビャワ (Japanese*), Biylsko-Biołŏ (Silesian*)
(Spain) Bilbao	Bì'ěrbā'è – 畢爾巴鄂 or Bì'ěrbāo – 畢爾包 (Chinese*), Bilbao (Azeri*, Catalan*, Croatian*, Dutch*, Estonian, Finnish*, French, Galician, German, Italian*, Latvian*, Lithuanian, Romanian*, Spanish*, Turkish*), Bilbao – ბილბაო (Georgian*), Bilbao / Pilbao – 빌바오 (Korean*), Bilbao – Билбао (Macedonian*, Serbian*), Bilbau (Portuguese*), Bilbo (Basque*), Birubao – ビルバオ (Japanese*), Bilbaum (Latin*)
(Ukraine) / (Autonomous Republic of Crimea) Bilohirsk	Belogorsk – Белогорск (Macedonian, Russian*, Serbian), Bilohirsk (German*), Bilohirs'k – Білогірськ (Ukrainian*), Karasubazar – Карасубазар (former Russian*, former Ukrainian*), Karasubazar (Turkish*), Qarasubazar (Azeri*), Qarasuvbazar (Crimean Tatar*)
(Ukraine) Bilshivtsi	Bilişăuţi (Romanian*), Bil'shivtsi – Більшівці (Ukrainian*), Bilşivtsi (Crimean Tatar*), Boljšovci – Бољшовци (Serbian*), Bol'shovtsy – Болшовцы (Russian*), Bolshvets – באָלשװעץ (Yiddish*), Bolšovci – Болшовци (Macedonian), Bołszowce (Polish*), Bilschiwzi or Bolschowitz (German*)
(Belgium) Bilzen	Belisia (Latin), Bilze (Limburgish*), Bilzen (Dutch*), Bilzenas (Lithuanian)
(Belgium) Binche	Benša (Latvian*), Bince (Walloon*), Binche (French*), Binchium (Latin*), Bing (archaic Dutch*)
(United Kingdom) (England) Birmingham	Bāmingamu – バーミンガム (Japanese*), Berminghem – ברמינגהם (Hebrew*), Birmingem – Бирмингем (Macedonian*, Russian*, Serbian*), Birmingema (Latvian*), Birmingemas (Lithuanian*), Birmingham (Dutchnl:Birmingham, Italianit:Birmingham), Bómínghàn – 伯明翰 (Chinese*), Brummagem (archaic local usage), Birminghamum (Latin)
(Germany) Bischofswerda	Bischofswerda (German*), Biskupice (Polish*), Bišofsverda – Бишофсверда (Macedonian*, Serbian), Biskopicy (Upper Sorbian*)
(Romania) Bistrița	Beszterce (Hungarian*), Bistrica – Бистрица (Macedonian*, Serbian*), Bistrița (Romanian*), Bistritz (German*), Bystrzyca (Polish*), Bästerts (Transylvanian Saxon), Bistritia (Latin)
(North Macedonia) Bitola	Bitolia (Latin*, Romanian*), Bitolj – Битољ (Serbian*), Bitolya – Битоля (Bulgarian*), Bitule (Aromanian*), Manastir / Manastiri (Albanian*), Manastır (Turkish*), Monastíri – Μοναστήρι (Greek*), Monastir (Ladino)
(Croatia) Bjelovar	Belovár (Hungarian), Belovar – Беловар (Macedonian), Belovar (Slovene), Bjelovar (Croatian), Bjelovar – Бјеловар (Serbian*), Bělovar (Czech*), Bellowar (German*), Bellovarium (Latin*)
(Belgium) Blankenberge	Blaankenbarg (Low Saxson*), Blancoberga (Latin), Blankenberga (Latvian), Blankenbergas (Lithuanian), Blankenberge (Dutch*) Blanknberge (West Flemish*)
(Germany) Blindheim (Bavaria)	Blenheim (Dutch, French), Blindhajm – Блиндхајм (Macedonian, Serbian), Blindheim (German*)
(Netherlands) Blokzijl	Blokzeilas (Lithuanian), Blokzijl (Dutch*), Blokziel (Low Saxon*), Bloksyl (Western Frisian*)
(Sweden) Boden	Boden (Swedish), Suttes (Lule Sami), Puuti (Finnish)
(Norway) Bodø	Bådåddjo (Lule Sami), Bodö (Swedish variant), Bodø (Danish, Norwegian), Boðvin (Icelandic), Budejju (Northern Sami), Buvdda (Pite Sami)
(North Macedonia) Bogdanci	Bogdanci (Croatian, Bosnian, Slovene), Bogdanci – Богданци (Bosnian, Macedonian, Serbian)
(Slovakia) Bojnice	Bajmóc (Hungarian*), Bojnice (Slovak*), Boynitse (Azerbaijani), Weinitz (German*)
(Italy) Bologna	Bollonya / Pollonya – 볼로냐 (Korean*), Bologna (Croatian*, Dutch*, Estonian, German*, Italian*, Finnish*, Romanian*, Slovene*, Swedish*), Bologne (French*), Boloňa (Czech*), Boloña (Galician*), Boloņa (Latvian*), Bolonha (Portuguese*), Bolonia (Polish*, Spanish*), Bolonija (Lithuanian*), Bolonja (Maltese), Bolonja – Болоња (Macedonian*, Serbian*), Bolonya (Azeri*, Catalan*, Turkish*), Bononia (Latin), Bulåggna (Bolognese*), Bolonja (Albanian), Bóluóníyà – 博洛尼亞 (Chinese*), Borōnya – ボローニャ (Japanese*), Felsina (Etruscan), Volonía – Βολωνία (Greek*)
(Netherlands) Bolsward	Boalsert (Western Frisian*), Bolsward (Dutch*)
(Italy) Bolzano/Bozen	Bal'tsana – Бaльцанa (Belarusian*), Bauzanum, Bozanum or Pons Drusi (Latin*), Bocen (Slovene*), Bocen – Боцен (Serbian*), Bocenas (Lithuanian*), Bó'ěrzhānuò – 博尔扎诺 (Chinese*), Bolcāno (Latvian*), Bolcano – Болцано (Macedonian*), Bolğan or Bolzan (Friulian*), Boltsano – בולצאנו (Hebrew*), Bol'tsano – Больцано (Russian*), Boltzáno – Μπολτζάνο (Greek*), Bolzano (Estonian, Italian*, Maltese, Romanian*), Bozen (Afrikaans*, Catalan, Croatian*, Dutch*, German*), Bulsan/Balsan or Busan (Ladin), Bulsaun (Romansh*)
(France) Bonifacio	Bonifacio (Finnish*, French*, Italian*), Bonifačo – Бонифачо (Macedonian*), Bonifačo – Бонифачо (Serbian*), Bunifaziu (Catalan, Corsican*), Bónífǎqí'ōu - 伯尼法奇欧/伯尼法奇歐 (Mandarin), Bunifazziu (Ligurian*), Bonifacium (Latin*)
(Germany) Bonn	Bō'ēn – 波恩 (Chinese*), Bon – בון (Hebrew*), Bon – ボン (Japanese*), Bon – Бон (Macedonian*, Serbian*), Bon (Turkish*), Bona (Lithuanian*, Portuguese*), Bonn (Croatian*, Dutch*, Estonian, German*, Italian*, Maltese, Romanian*), Bonna or Castrum Bonnense (Latin*), Bonna (Latvian*), Būn –بُون (Arabic), Vónni – Βόννη (Greek*)
(Netherlands) Borculo	Borculo (Dutch*), Borklo (Low Saxon*), Borulas (Lithuanian)
(France) Bordeaux	Bō'ěrduō – 波爾多 (Chinese*), Boreudo / Porŭdo – 보르도 (Korean*), Bordaíl (Irish*), Bordeaux (Croatian*, Dutch*, Estonian, French*, Finnish*, German*, Hungarian*, Romanian*, Swedish*), Bordèu (Occitan*), Bordeus (Catalan*), Bordéus (Portuguese*), Bordó – Μπορντώ (Demotic Greek*), Bordo – בורדו (Hebrew*), Bordo (Latvian*, Lithuanian*), Bordo – Бордо (Macedonian*, Serbian*), Bordozo (Esperanto*), Borudō – ボルドー (Japanese*), Burdeos (Spanish*, Tagalog*), Bordele (Basque*), Bourdel (Breton*), Burdigala (Latin*), Būrdū – بوردو (Arabic*), Vordhígala – Βορδίγαλα (Greek Katharevousa)
(Belgium) Borgloon	Borchlonium (Latin*), Borgloon (Dutch*), Lô (Walloon*), Loeën (Limburgish*), Looz (French*)
(Italy) Bormio	Bormio (German*, Italian*), Bormio – Бормио (Serbian*), Buorm (Romansh), Worms im Veltlintal (former German*), Bormi (Lombard*), Bormium (Latin*)
(Romania) Botoșani	Batashon – באטאשאָן (Yiddish*), Botošani – Ботошани (Macedonian*, Serbian*), Botoșani (Romanian*), Botosány (Hungarian*), Botoszany (Polish*)
(Belgium) Bouillon	Bouillon (Dutch*, French*, German*, Italian*, Romanian*), Bouyon (Walloon*), Buglione (old Italian*), Bujon – Бујон (Macedonian*, Serbian), Bulhão (Portuguese*), Bullionium (Latin*)
(France) Boulogne-sur-Mer	Bolonia-sobre-el-Mar (former Spanish*), Bolonha-sobre-o-Mar (Portuguese*), Bonen aan zee (Dutch, older*), Boulogne-sur-Mer (Dutch, Finnish*, French*, German*, Italian*, Spanish*) Bononia (Latin), Bulonj sir Mer – Булоњ сир Мер (Serbian*), Gesoriacum (Roman Latin*), Boulonne-su-Mér (Picard*)
(Portugal) Braga	Beuraga / Pŭraga – 브라가 (Korean*), Bracara Augusta (Latin), Braga (English*, French*, Galician, Portuguese*, Romanian*, Spanish*), Braga – Брага (Serbian*), Buraga – ブラガ (Japanese*)
(Portugal) Bragança	Bragança (Catalan*, Galego*, Portuguese*), Bragance (French*), Bragansa – Браганса (Serbian), Braganza (English*, German*, Spanish*), Bergáncia or Bergança (Mirandese*)
(Belgium) Braine-le-Comte	Braine-le-Comte (French*), Bren le Komtas (Lithuanian), Brenna Comitis (Latin), Brinne-e-Hinnot (Walloon*), Brinne-in-Hénau (Picard*), 's-Graevenbraokel (Zeelandic*), 's-Gravebrakel (Limburgish*), 's-Gravenbrakel (Dutch*)
(Poland) Braniewo	Branievo – Браниево (Macedonian*), Braniewo (Polish*), Branjevo – Брањево (Serbian*), Braunsberg (German*), Brus (Old Prussian), Branievum (Latin)
(Romania) Brașov	Brašov (Czech*), Brašov – Брашов (Macedonian*, Serbian*), Brașov (Romanian*), Brašovas (Lithuanian*), Brashovi – ბრაშოვი (Georgian*), Brassó (Hungarian*), Braszów (Polish*), Brassovia or Corona (Latin*), Kronstadt (German*), Brasau (alternative German), Kruhnen (Transylvanian Saxon), Stefanoúpoli – Στεφανούπολη (Greek*), Stephanopolis (alternative Latin)
(Slovakia) Bratislava	An Bhratasláiv (Irish*), Beuratiseullaba / Pŭrat'isŭllaba – 브라티슬라바 (Korean*), Bratislabha – ব্রাতিস্লাভা (Bengali), Bratislafa (Welsh*), Bratislava – Բրատիսլավա (Armenian*), Bratislava (Azeri*, Bosnian*, Croatian*, Czech*, Dutch*, Estonian, Finnish*, French*, Galician, Italian*, Latvian*, Lithuanian*, Maltese, Portuguese*, Romanian*, Slovak*, Slovene*, Spanish*, Swedish*, Turkish*), Bratislava – Братислава (Bulgarian*, Macedonian*, Serbian*), Brat'islava – ბრატისლავა (Georgian*), Bratislava – ברטיסלבה (Hebrew*), Braťislava or Požoma (Romani), Bratislava – براثس لاوا (Urdu*), Bratislavia (Latin*), Bratyslava – Братислава (Ukrainian*), Bratysława (Polish*), Bùlādísīlāfā – 布拉迪斯拉發 (Chinese*), Burachisuraba – ブラチスラバ (Japanese*), Pozsony (Hungarian*), Požun (older Croatian*), Presbourg (French until 1919*), Pressburg (English until 1919), Pressburg or Preßburg (German*), Presburgo or Posonia (Italian until 1919), Prešporok (Slovak until 1919*), Prešpurk (Czech until 1919*),Presvoúrgo – Πρεσβούργο (Greek until 1919*) [Note:The name was officially changed from Pressburg / Prešporok / Pozsony to Bratislava in 1919; for a list of older names see Bratislava.], Pojon (older Romanian)
(Ukraine) Bratslav	Bracłaŭ – Брацлаў (Belarusian*), Braclav – Брацлав (Macedonian*, Serbian, Ukrainian*), Bracław (Polish*), Broslev – בראָסלעװ (Yiddish*)
(Germany) Braunschweig	Bráounsvaig – Μπράουνσβαϊγκ (Greek*), Braunschweig (German*, Norwegian*, Slovene*), Braunšvajg – Брауншвајг (Macedonian*, Serbian*), Braunšveiga (Latvian*), Breunswyk (West Frisian*), Brunonis vicus, Brunopolis, Brunsvicum* or Brunsvigia (Latin), Brunšvik (Czech*), Brunsvique (Portuguese*), Brunswick (historical English*, French*, Italian*, Romanian*, Spanish*), Brunswiek or Bronswiek (Low German*), Brunswijk (Dutch*), Brunswyk (Afrikaans*), Brunszwik (Polish*), Bùlúnruìkè – 不倫瑞克 (Chinese*), Vrounsvíki – Βρουνσβίκη (older Greek*)
(Netherlands) Breda	Breda (Dutch*), Bréda (French*)
(Netherlands) Bredevoort	Brādford (Anglo-Saxon*), Bredevoort (Dutch*), Breevoort (Low German*, Low Saxon*)
(Belgium) Bree	Brē (Latvian), Brea (Latin), Bree (Dutch*, Limburgish*), Brée (French*), Bri (Lithuanian)
(Czech Republic) Břeclav	Břeclav (Czech*, Slovak*), Breclav – Брецлав (Serbian*), Brzecław (Polish*), Bšeclav – Бшецлав (Macedonian*), Leventevár (old Hungarian*), Lundenburg (German*), Breclavum (Latin*)
(Germany) Breisach	Breisach am Rhein (German), Vieux-Brisach (French), Alt-Brisach (Alemannic German*), Brisacum (Latin*)
(Germany) Bremen	Beuremen / Pŭremen – 브레멘 (Korean*), Breemen (Estonian alternate), Bréma (Hungarian*), Brema (Italian*, Latin*, Polish*, Portuguese*, Spanish*), Brême (French*), Brēme (former Latvian), Bremen (Afrikaans*, Azeri*, Croatian*, Danish*, Dutch*, Estonian*, Frisian*, German*, Low German*, Norwegian*, Portuguese*, Romanian*, Slovene*, Swedish*, Turkish*), Bremen – Бремен (Macedonian*, Serbian*), Brėmenas (Lithuanian*), Brēmene (Latvian*), Bremeni – ბრემენი (Georgian*), Brémy (Czech*, Slovak*), Brimarborg or Brimar (Icelandic*), Bùláiméi – 不來梅 (Chinese*), Burēmen – ブレーメン (Japanese*), Vrémi – Βρέμη (Greek*)
(Germany) Bremerhaven	Bremerhaven (Dutch*, German*, Low German*, Romanian*), Bremerhafen – Бремерхафен (Macedonian*, Serbian*), Brémský Přístav (Czech, rare*), Bremerhoben (Low German*), Bremae Portus (Latin*)
(Belarus) Brest	Berestia – Берестя (Ukrainian*), Bieraście – Берасьце (Belarusian, Classical Orthography*), Brasta (Lithuanian*), Brest (Azeri*, Estonian, German*, Italianit:Brest, Romanian*), Brest – Брэст (Belarusian), Brest – ברסט (Hebrew*), Brest – Брест (Serbian*), Bresta(Latvian*), Brest Litevský (Czech), Brest-Litovsk (former English, former Romanian*), Brest-Litovsk – Брест-Литовск (Macedonian*, former Russian*), Brest-Litowsk (former German), Brisk – בריסק (Yiddish*), Brześć Litewski (Polish*), Brześć nad Bugiem (Polish, 1918–1939*), Lietuvos Brasta (former Lithuanian*), Brestia or Berestia (Latin*)
(France) Brest	Brest (Breton, English, French), Brīst – بريست (Arabic*), Gesoscribātē (Roman Latin)
(Slovakia) Brezno	Breznas (Lithuanian*), Brezno (Slovak*), Breznóbánya (Hungarian*), Bries (German*), Briesen (alternative German)
(Slovakia) Brezová pod Bradlom	Berezó (Hungarian*), Brezova pie Bradlas (Latvian*), Brezová pod Bradlom (Slovak*), Birkenhain (German*)
(Netherlands) Brielle	Brielle (Dutch*), Brilė (Lithuanian), Brīle (Latvian), Brill (English), Den Briel (alternative Dutch, Zeelandic*)
(United Kingdom) (England) Bristol	Bùlǐsītuō'ěr – 布里斯托爾 (Chinese*), Briostó (Irish*), Bristol (Dutch*, Italian*, Romanian*), Bristol – Бристол (Macedonian*, Serbian*), Bristole (Latvian*), Bryste (Welsh*), Caerodor (Welsh, obsolete*), Bristolium (Latin*)
(Italy) Brixen/Bressanone	Bressanone (Italian*), Brixen (German*), Brixino or Brixina (Latin*), Persenon or Porsenú (Ladin*)
(Czech Republic) Brno	Berén (native Hungarian, old*), Berno (old Polish*), Brna or Brnos (Romani), Brno (Azeri*, Croatian*, Czech*, Dutch*, Estonian*, Finnish*, Hungarian*, Italian*, Latvian*, Polish *, Romanian*, Slovak*), Brno – ბრნო (Georgian*), Brno – Брно (Macedonian*, Russian*, Serbian*), Bruna (old Italian*, Latin *), Brünn (German*, older Hungarian *), Bruno (Portuguese*)
(Ukraine) Brody	Brod (Romanian*), Brod – בראָד (Yiddish*), Brodi – Броди (Macedonian*, Serbian), Brody (Polish*), Brody – Броды (Russian*), Brody – Броди (Ukrainian*)
(Netherlands) Bronkhorst	Bronk'orst (Zeelandic*), Bronkhorst (Dutch*)
(Netherlands) Brouwershaven	Brouw (alternative Zeelandic), Brouwershaven (Dutch*), Brouwes'aeven (Zeelandic*)
(Belgium) Bruges	Brige (Latvian*), Briugė (Lithuanian*), Briž – Бриж (Macedonian*, Serbia*), Briz – Μπρυζ* or Vríyi – Βρύγη (Greek), Brögke (Limburgian*), Bruges (Catalan*, French*, Italian*, Luxembourgish*, Portuguese*, Romanian*), Brugge (Afrikaans*, Croatian*, Danish*, Dutch*, Estonian*, Indonesian*, Irish, Norwegian*, West Flemish*), Brügge (Finnish*, German*), Bruggia (old Italian*), Bruggy (Slovak*), Brugia (Polish*), Brugy (Czech*), Brujas (Spanish*, medieval Portuguese*), Bruj (Turkish*), Bruzh – ברוז (Hebrew*), Brycg (Anglo-Saxon*), Brygge (Swedish*), Bryzh (Albanian*), Bùlǔrì – 布魯日 (Chinese*), Bruj – بروج (Arabic*), Brugae (Latin*)
(Czech Republic) Bruntál	Bruntál (Czech*, Slovak*), Bruntal (Polish*), Bruntal - Брунтал (Serbian*), Freudenthal (German*)
(Belgium) Brussels	A' Bhruiseal or Am Bhruiseal (Scottish Gaelic*), An Bhruiséil (Irish*), Beurwisel / Pŭrwisel – 브뤼셀 (Korean*), Borsella (old Italian*), Bréissel (Luxembourgish*), Brisel – בריסל (Hebrew*), Brisel – Брисел (Macedonian*, Serbian*), Brisele (Latvian*), Brisl – בריסל (Yiddish*), Briuseli – ბრიუსელი (Georgian*), Briuselis (Lithuanian*), Brössel (Limburgish*), Bruchsal (old German), Bruksel / Brukseli (Albanian), Brūksel – بروكسل (Arabic), Bruksel (Armenian), Brüksel (Turkish*), Bruksela (Polish*), Brusel (Czech*, Slovak*), Brusela (Basque*), Bruselas (Spanish*, Tagalog*) Bruselj (Slovene*), Brussel (Afrikaans*, Dutch*, Indonesian*, Norwegian*, West Frisian*) Brüssel (Azeri*, Estonian*, German*), Brússel (Faroese *), Brussèla (Arpitan*), Brussele (Walloon*), Brussell (Maltese), Brusselle (former Italian*), Brusseŀles (Catalan*), Brüsszel (Hungarian*), Bruxelas (Galician*, Portuguese*), Bruxellae (Latin*) Bruxelles (Croatian, French*, Italian*, Romanian*), Brysel (Anglo-Saxon*), Bryssel (Danish*, Finnish*, Swedish*), Bryussel' – Брюссель (Russian*, Ukrainian*), Brwsel (Welsh*), Bùlǔsài'ěr – 布魯塞爾 (Chinese*), Buryusseru – ブリュッセル (Japanese*), Vrixélles – Βρυξέλλες (Greek*)
(Poland) Brzesko	Brigel – בריגל (Yiddish*), Brzesko (Polish*), Bžesko – Бжеско (Serbian*)
(Poland) Brzeziny	Brzeziny (Dutch*, Finnish*, French*, German*, Italian*, Polish*, Portuguese*, Romanian*, Slovenian*), Bžezini (Latvian*), Löwenstadt (German, 1939–1945)
(Ukraine) Buchach	Betshotsh – בעטשאָטש (Yiddish*), Bučač – Бучач (Macedonian*, Serbian), Buchach – Бучач (Russian*, Ukrainian*), Buczacz (Polish*, Romanian*), Butschatsch (German*), Butchatch - בּוּצ'אץ (Hebrew*)
(Romania) Bucharest	Boekares (Limburgish*), Boekarest (Afrikaans*, Dutch*), Búcairist (Irish*), Bucarest (French*, Italian*, Spanish*), Bucarèst (Arpitan*), Bucaresta (Latin*, Romansh*), Bucareste (Portuguese*), București (Romanian*), Bucuresti (Norwegian*), Bùjiālèsītè – 布加勒斯特 (Chinese*), Bukares (Indonesian*), Bukaresht – בוקארעשט (Yiddish*), Bukarest (Danish*, Estonian, Finnish*, German*, Hungarian*, Maltese, Swedish*), Bukarest – בוקרשט (Hebrew*), Bukarešta (Slovene*), Bukareštas (Lithuanian*), Bukareste (Latvian*), Bukarest'i – ბუქარესტი (Georgian*), Bukaresuto – ブカレスト (Japanese*), Bukareszt (Polish*), Bukharest – Բուխարեստ (Armenian*), Bukharest – Бухарест (Russian*, Ukrainian*), Bükreş (Turkish*), Bukuresht / Bukureshti (Albanian*), Bukuresht – Букурещ (Bulgarian*), Bukureshti (Romani*, Ladino*), Bukurešt (Croatian*), Bukurešť (Czech*, Bukurešt – Букурешт (Macedonian*, Serbian*), Slovak*), Bukuresyuti / Puk'uresyut'i – 부쿠레슈티 (Korean*), Būqārist – بوخارست (Arabic), Buxarest (Azeri*), Bwcarest (Welsh*), Voukourésti – Βουκουρέστι (Greek*)
(Hungary) Budapest	Boedapes (Limburgish*), Boedapest (Afrikaans*, Dutch*), Búdaipeist (Irish*), Bùdápèisī – 布達佩斯 (Chinese*), Budapesht – Բուդապեշտ (Armenian*), Budapesht – בודפשט (Hebrew*), Budap'esht'i – ბუდაპეშტი (Georgian*), Budapeşt (Azeri*), Budapešť (Czech*, Slovak*), Budapest (Estonian, Finnish*, Galician*, German*, Italian*, Hungarian*, Maltese, Spanish*, Swedish*), Búdapest (Icelandic), Budapèst (Arpitan*), Budapešt – Будапешт (Russian*, Ukrainian*), Budapešta – Будапеща (Bulgarian*), Budapešta (Latvian*), Budapesta (Romanian*), Budapeštas (Lithuanian*), Budapeste (Portuguese*), Budapeşte (Turkish*), Buda-Pesth (old German*), Budapestinum (Latin*), Budapesuto – ブダペスト (Japanese*), Budapeszt (Polish*), Budimpešta (Croatian*, Slovene*), Budimpešta – Будимпешта (Macedonian*, Serbian*), Bwdapest (Welsh*), Ofenpesth (former German*), Peshta (Romani*), Pešť-Budín (former Slovak), Voudhapésti – Βουδαπέστη (Greek*)
(Croatia) Buje	Buie (Italian*), Buje (Croatian*, Slovene*), Buje – Бује (Macedonian, Serbian*), Bullae (Latin*)
(Netherlands) Bunschoten	Bunschoten (Dutch*), Bunsjoten (Low Saxon*)
(Netherlands) Buren	Buren (Dutch*), Buur'n (Zeelandic*)
(Germany) Burg Stargard	Burg Stargard (German*), Burg Štargard – Бург Штаргард (Serbian), Stargard Meklemburski (Polish*), Burgum Stargardum (Latin)
(Bulgaria) Burgas	Burgas (English), Burgas – Бургас (Bulgarian, Macedonian, Russian, Serbian), Pýrgos – Πύργος (Ancient Greek), Pyrgus (Latin), Пѵ́ргъ (Church Slavonic), Burgaz (Turkish), Burgasz (Hungarian), Boergas (Dutch), Burgasas (Lithuanian), Burgasi – ბურგასი (Georgian*)
(Switzerland) Burgdorf	Berthoud (French*), Burgdorf (German*), Bùùrdlef (Alemannic German*)
(Albania) Butrint	Butrint / Butrinti (Albanian*), Butrint – Бутринт (Serbian*), Butrinto (Italian*), Butrinto – Бутринто (Macedonian*), Vouthrotó – Βουθρωτό (Greek), Buthrōtum (Latin*)
(Croatia) Buzet	Buzet (Croatian*, Slovene*), Buzet – Бузет (Macedonian, Serbian*), Pinguente (Italian*), Piquentum (Latin*)
(Slovakia) Bytča	Bitča (Latvian*, Lithuanian*), Bytča (Slovak*) Großbitsch (German*), Nagybiccse (Hungarian*)
(Poland) Bydgoszcz	Bidgošč – Бидгошч (Macedonian*, Serbian*), Bidgošča (Latvian), Bıdqoş (Azerbaijani), Bromberch (Frisian), Bromberg (German*), Bydgoščius (Lithuanian*), Bidgostia (Latin*), Bydgoszcz (Polish*), Bydhošč – Бидгошч (Ukrainian), Bydhošť (Czech, Slovak)
(Poland) Bytom	Beuthen (German*), Bitom – Битом (Macedonian*, Serbian*), Bytom (Polish*), Bytům (Silesian*), Bitomum or Bithomia (Latin*)
(Poland) Bytów	Bëtowò (Kashubian/Pomeranian*), Bitov – Битов (Macedonian*, Serbian*), Bütow (German*), Bytów (Polish*), Bitovia (Latin)
