= Roman Onderka =

Czech politician

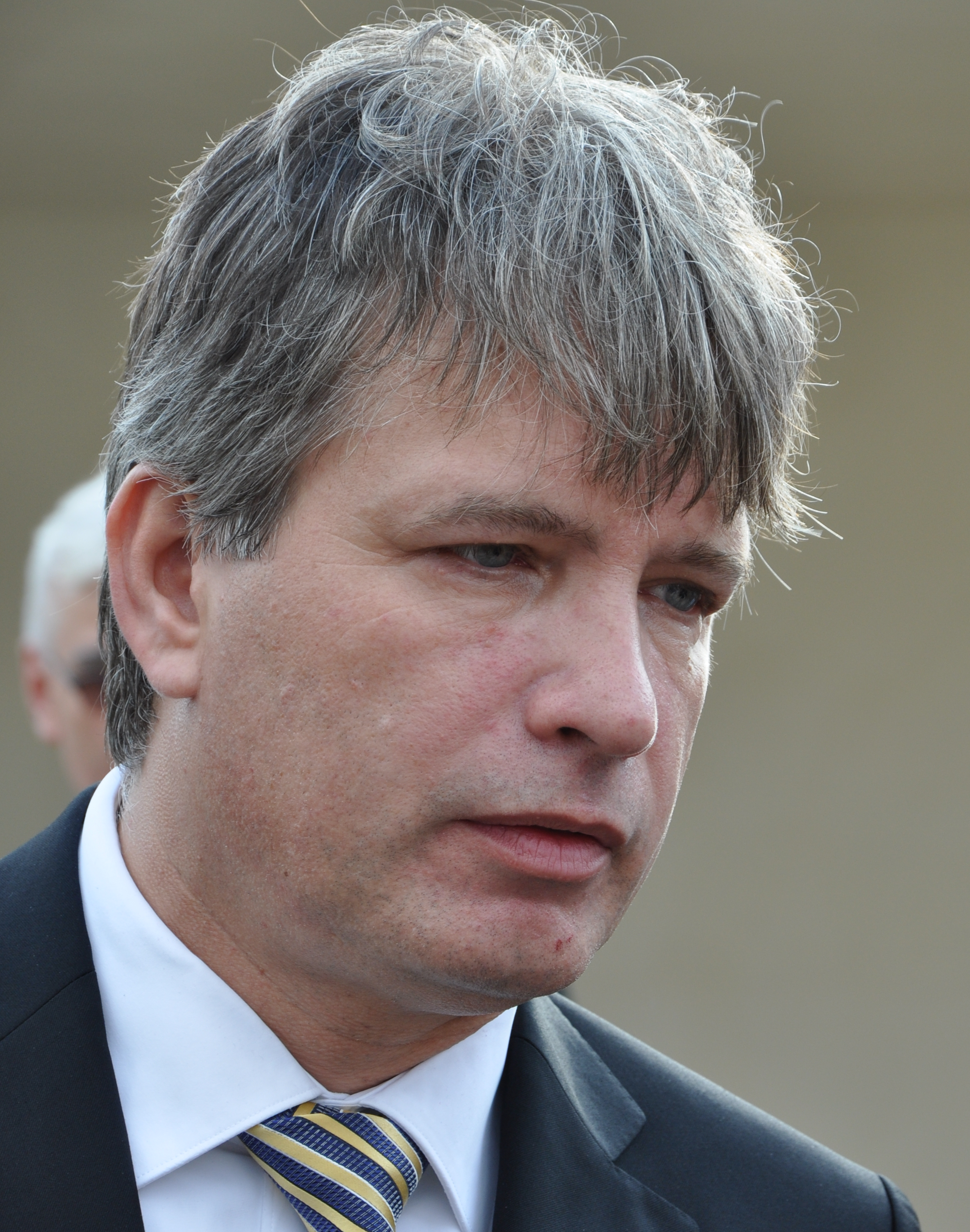
Roman Onderka

Roman Onderka (born 11 November 1965 in Brno) is a Czech politician who has served as the mayor of Brno, and has been a member of the Chamber of Deputies of the Czech Republic since October 2017, and a vice chairman of the Czech Social Democratic Party since 2018. On 25 October 2021 he became acting leader of ČSSD when Jan Hamáček resigned on the position.
