= František R. Kraus =

Czechoslovak writer

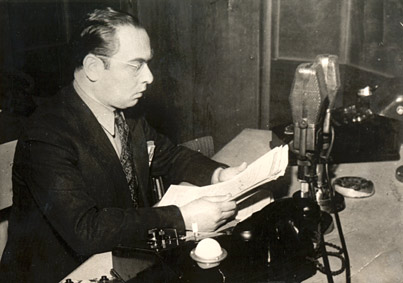
- Born: October 14, 1903; Prague
- Died: May 19, 1967 (aged 63); Prague
- Other name: גדעון בן יצחק קראוס
- Occupation: writer

František R. Kraus (גדעון בן יצחק קראוס Gideon ben Yitzhak with his Hebrew name, also known under his Terezín alter ego he had during the holocaust The Terezín Moses (October 14, 1903, Prague - May 19, 1967, Prague) was a Czechoslovak Jewish anti-fascist writer, journalist and editor, member of the resistance movement, sportsperson, and one of the best known Czech holocaust survivors.

He is considered to have written probably the very first autobiographical testimonial on surviving the holocaust (in Terezín Ghetto and Auschwitz) in the world ever. It was published already in June 1945 under the title Gas, gas… then fire.

In the interwar period, he was a journalist of the famed Prager Tagblatt, also Freie Presse, and others, and was an editor in the Czechoslovak Radio, the founder of its Shortwave section and speaker for the Foreign section in Czech, German, French and English.

In his literary work, he deals with reflexion of the Holocaust in Czechoslovakia; topics such as human existence, dignity, justice, guilt and hope. Main theme of his short stories is a pictorial world of weird figures and characters from old Prague.

Due to his political prosecution during the Communist regime in Czechoslovakia, vast majority of his work was censored and banned. One of his disciples, Arnošt Lustig, considered him to be one of the most important modern Czech writers ever and compared him to authors such as Jack London, Egon Erwin Kisch or Primo Levi and taught his legacy in universities in the United States.

Kraus remained relatively unknown in the present-day Czech Republic until the 2020s, his books being denied publication until 1989 and the collapse of the Communist regime in Czechoslovakia. His legacy has been rediscovered quite recently (during and after the Covid-19 pandemic) through his posthumously published trilogy on pre-WWII Prague, its daily Jewish life, and the Holocaust in Terezín and Auschwitz. Since, his has been critically acclaimed by both historians and wide Czech community.

== Childhood and early life ==
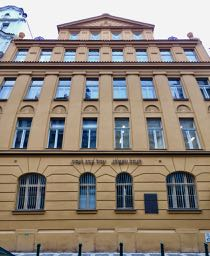
Talmud-Thora Schule in Prague, that Kraus attended as a boy in the 1910s and 1920s.

František R. Kraus was born in Josefov, then the Jewish quarter in Prague into a Jewish family of Robert Kraus, a travelling salesman and Matylda Kraus née Kollmann, a housewife. As it was common in better well-off Jewish families at that time, he obtained his basic education at a catholic Piarist convent school in Panská Street. Later he continued at Realschule in Jindřišská Street. He graduated at Gymnasium in Kinský palace at the Old Town Square. He also attended Talmud-Thora Schule in Josefov’s Jáchymova Street. Because his parents divorced, due to financial circumstances he could not pursue his academic career and instead went into journalism as a teenager.

== Pre-WWII Czechoslovakia ==
Kraus was a journalist and writer. He belonged to the so-called "Der enge Prager Kreis" or "close Prague circle" (Prager Kreis). Right at the end of the World War I, he started to work for German newspaper, for example for the famous Prager Tagblatt, Prager Presse, Bohemia and others. He had strong ties to the Czech intellectual elite. He was well-befriended with Max Brod, Franz Kafka, (he describes his first encounter in a short story entitled "Džbánek plzeňského" - "A Mug of Pilsner"), Karel Čapek, Jaroslav Hašek, as well as he knew Tomáš Garrigue Masaryk and his son Jan Masaryk. However, his literary role-model, family friend and life teacher was "The Angry Reporter" Egon Erwin Kisch. He even lived in his house for some time.

In the 1930s, Kraus participated on the foundation of the Czechoslovak Radio, he was an editor of the "Spoken news". He was also active as a reporter, journalist and editor in the Czech News Agency (ČTK) for quite a long time. Collaboration with the Berlin-based magazine Die Grüne Post would often bring him abroad; he reported from Berlin, Vienna but even from outside of Europe.

Kraus was also a keen sportsman. He played soccer from a young age, later added water polo and track swimming. At first for the famous Slavia Prague, in the 1930s he joined Hagibor Prague, a top class Jewish Sports Club, one of the best sport organizations in prewar Czechoslovakia. In the 1930s, he competed for that club in swimming and won several medals, including gold for the overall swimming champion of Czechoslovakia. Kraus also regularly represented Czechoslovakia at the International Maccabiah Games.

In the late 1930s, Hitler's Nazi regime was on the rise, and was threatening Czechoslovakia. Kraus often spoke against Nazism - the especially against Konrad Henlein and rise of Nazi powers in the Sudetenland - in his regular radio relations. Therefore, he provoked anger of the Henlein followers who even interpelled against him in the Czechoslovak Parliament.

In May 1938, during the Munich Crisis, he joined the army during mobilization (a story "A Helmet in the Field" ("Přilba v poli")). These events, culminating with the Munich betrayal (the "Runciman at Henlein's" report), had tragic results not solely for him.

== Protectorate, resistance, and arrest ==
After the German occupation of Czechoslovakia, Kraus became an informer of the resistance group of František Schmoranz. This network, later known as the "Schmoranz group" did mostly intel activities and collection of information about the German Army. This information was then passed along to the former analyst of the Czechoslovak Army and in the form of messages, these were then sent through the Obrana národa to London. After Schmnoranz being arrested by the Gestapo, Kraus was also arrested. He was interrogated in the Petschek Palace and then briefly jailed at Pankrác but because his connection to the group was never proved, he was eventually released.

== Holocaust ==
Because, during the 1930s, he was one of the strongest voices criticizing the Nazis, Henlein's SdP, their evil methods and their rise to power, he was immediately on their blacklist not only as a Jew, but as a Social Democrat and as a member of intelligentsia. In November 1941, Kraus was put onto the first transport to Terezín, the Ak-1 ("Aufbaukommando Eins"), the so-called "Ghetto Build-up Unit". This group was sent ahead to prepare the small city of Terezín in North Bohemia for the planned incoming transports of dozens of thousands of Jews, mainly from the Protectorate, Germany and Austria, into the city, therefore becoming a ghetto. In the transport, Kraus got the number Ak-353. The Ak-1 transport was a normal, passenger train, not cattle wagons as it was common later. As there is no railroad connection to Terezín from the main corridor, the group was transported to nearby Bohušovice nad Ohří and from there had to walk, escorted by Czech gendarmerie, to Terezín.

=== Terezín ===
In November 1941 he was placed in the very first transport to Terezin. It was designated with "Ak-1", which was the abbreviation for "Aufbaukommando Eins", ie. "The First Commando for Construction". This group was to take part in the conversion of the city of Terezin to the Jewish ghetto. Kraus received number Ak-353 when registering. This first Terezín transport was still a normal classical train, not the cattle-wagons that were used later. The tranmsport left Praha - Masarykovo nádraží on 24 November 1941. They went by train to Litoměřice, went to Bohušovice and walked to Terezín, accompanied by Czech gendarmes.

Kraus was then authorized by Judenältestenrat until June 1943, when Terezín was connected to the railway line Praha-Lovosice-Ústí nad Labem by railway siding, organizing pedestrian crossings transported from Bohušovice nad Ohří to Terezín, 3 kilometers away. He served as a popular nickname in the ghetto because he always went to the front of the crowd.

"The children were not born in the ghetto, but they were forbidden under the death penalty, but the old men from Vienna and Prague, from Frankfurt and Hamburg, Amsterdam and Oslo were briefly packed into wagons, sealed and the signs pointing to the direction: "Theresienstadt, Protektorat Böhmen und Mähren, The Deutsches Reich. "So another one came to Vienna (...) Even today, I am Moses, I have a yellow band on my left shoulder" Jüdische Transportbegleitmannschaft ", I am at the head of a sad parade, I have a member of the Viennese Order The black skirt, the tall collar of the clergy peeks from beneath the cloak, the serpent and the black sash add to the cunning of a man of noble face, he is heroic, not intimidated, around his neck is a black collar on which the silver cross hangs, and on the left side of his chest the great David Star starred with the inscription "JUDE" - And bring back our scattered ..., page 64 " At the same time, he was given the task of commanding the Communist Command of Inmates in 1942, who built the Terezín Crematorium in the Bohušovice Basin between Bohušovice and Terezín. Even in such terrible conditions, he retained a noble, always dressed, dressed in a tie, in a hat and in a suit, and paid for "the best man dressed in Terezin."

He was also one of the thirty prisoners of the Terezín Ghetto who buried the murdered men of Lidice - this terrible experience later described in the story of I buried the dead of Lidice.

=== Auschwitz ===
From Terezin he was transported with his wife on October 1, 1944 to Auschwitz. Upon arrival, they were divided in the selection. He himself was lucky and was chosen for work, commuting every day from Auschwitz together other prisoners for daily work at IG Farben near Buna, where synthetic gasoline was produced. One day, blacksmiths and carpenters were to sign up - Kraus, who was a clerk by profession and hardly ever held a hammer in his hand, signed up. He was again lucky and was included in the work camp in Gleiwitz, where prisoners were repairing railway wagons, a terrible job for which prisoners from Terezin were mostly selected.

In this selection, Kraus was left on the left forearm number B-11632. This terrible experience is described in the book "Gas, Gas ... Then Fire":

"Our stream goes further, to the five boys, the prisoners who are tattooing, they call us in incomprehensible jargon, and I go badly to the butcher: I drape my left forearm, I have a piece of wood dipped in tincture, it's dull It hurts it The blood is already flowing through the crate It pulls out the knife and cuts it So now it's got a good tip It sinks, yes, now it goes, tincture, some purple ink, it mixes with blood It hurts, I hold tight my teeth, it's slow: B-11632 So now it's done I'm reporting a number at the back of the exit and I'm leaving in the stand I'm hurting, we all have to hold our hands up, it has to dry out ... 'Schmutzige seite - reine Seite.' We go out, fascinate Sing - Sing, punched rags and hungry, and we are not hungry yet ... "

In KZ Gleiwitz, Kraus was probably the last person to talk to Karel Poláček and Fritz Taussig before they both died of the terrible conditions of the camp.

He was later reassigned at the turn of 1944 and 1945 to another factory to work, to Blechhammer (today Blachownia). In March 1945, the Nazi labor camps began to liquidate and organize the march of death. From Blechhammer, the death march was also dispatched, but he and several other people (including George Brady) managed to escape, and thanks to the partisans via Poland and the Carpathian Ruthenia in April 1945, they were already liberated in Budapest.

In Budapest, Kraus began to recover from the hardships of the camps. He contacted the people he knew as a journalist. They got him basic help, rented a small flat in Arpad utca. In Budapest he wrote down his experiences. In May 1945 he arrived in Prague and had already a manuscript for a book; A Book-report named Gas, gas ... then the fire was released in September 1945 and it was the very first report about the extermination camps that came out in Czechoslovakia. Published by Chvojka. The second part A brings back our scattered ... it was a sequel, but from another angle. The emphasis is here on the make-up of the period in Terezín. She went a little later, also with an envelope from his friend, who also survived a stay in the camp, the academic painter David Friedmann.

== After WWII ==
When Prague was liberated, Kraus came back home. He was reunited with not only his wife Alice, who also survived Terezín and Auschwitz, but also both of his parents. They then lived together in the Jewish Quarter.

The Communist putsch in Czechoslovakia in 1948 greatly influenced Kraus' life. After the war, he re-joined the Czechoslovak Press Office and Czechoslovak Radio, where he became the head of the foreign broadcast. He acted as a speaker in the English, French and German editorial and commentator for Central Europe. His most important student was Arnošt Lustig. All this ended in the early 1950s during the Slánský trial. Kraus has lost his employment in both ČTK and the radio. He was not allowed to publish. His work was repeatedly changed by the censorship, then completely rebuked, with the reasoning that "The Holocaust has been completely exhausted for five years after the war. It is past and no one is interested in it. People now have to focus on the future - building a new, better and more just society - Communism."

His books The Three Rifles, The Face Number 5 and a children book The Song about Léa were not published. The Face Number 5 is about a Nazi criminal who changes his identity after the war. The same theme was used in a 1965 movie Ztracená tvář.

Kraus published under pseudonyms, especially his stories from Old Prague at the end of the 19th and the beginning of the 20th century, enjoyed a great popularity. They were published in a newspaper Večerní Praha. He published regularly in the Jewish Yearbook under his own name. He was employed by the Jewish society in Prague, where he led the cultural department. Thanks to him famous personalities such as Jan Werich, Karel Gott, Judita Čeřovská and Waldemar Matuška performed in the cultural programs.

František Kraus died in Prague on May 19, 1967. He lived long enough to see the Liblice conference about Franz Kafka, which he considered to be a turning point in cultural and political life.

He is buried at the New Jewish Cemetery in Prague.

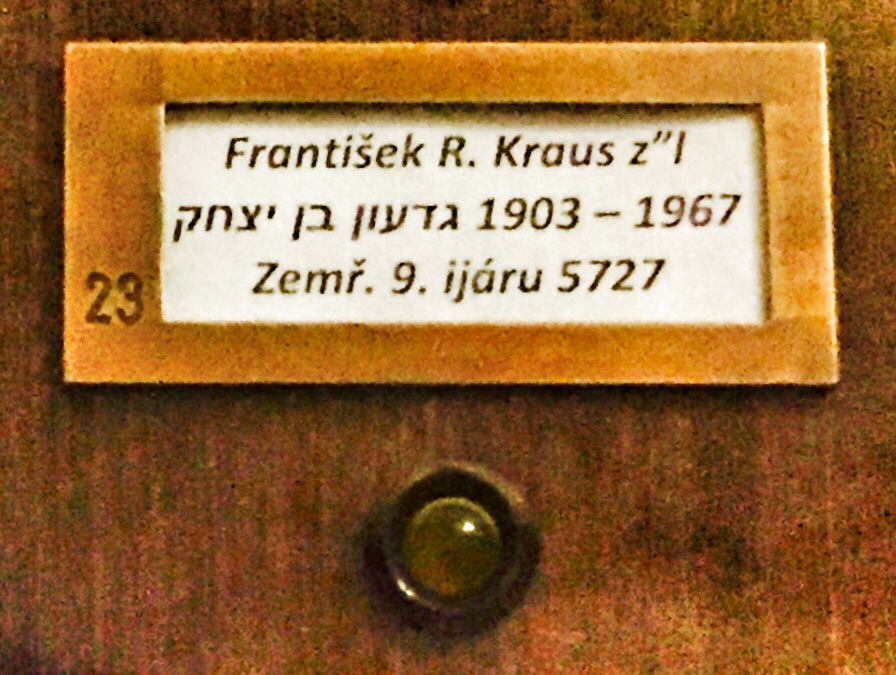
A yahrzeit table for F.R.Kraus in the Old New Synagogue in Prague

His book A Hangman without a Shadow was published in 2003.

== Literary works ==
- Gas, gas... then Fire (Plyn, plyn… pak oheň) (1945)
- And Bring Back Our Scattered Ones (A přiveď zpět naše roztroušené)
- David Will Live (Originally Shemaryahu seeks God) (David bude žít; Šemarjáhu hledá Boha)
- A Changed Land (Proměněná země) (1957)
- A Hangman Without a Shadow (Kat beze stínu) (written in the 1960s, published illegally in samizdat in 1984, officially published in 2003)
- Drůš Mauruse Blocha

== Sources and further reading ==
- Sto let Františka R. Krause
- Alena Drábková - Reflexe holocaustu v české literatuře 1945–1949
