= Anna Hyndráková =

Czech historian (1928–2022)

- Born: Anna Kovanicová; 25 March 1928; Prague, Czechoslovakia
- Died: 20 February 2022 (aged 93); Prague, Czech Republic
- Children: Alena (daughter); Pavel (son)
- Parent(s): Pavel Kovanic; Augusta Kovanicová (née Spitzová)

Anna Hyndráková (née Kovanicová; 25 March 1928 – 20 February 2022) was a Czech Holocaust survivor and historian. She worked at the Jewish Museum in Prague. During World War II, she survived both forced labour and concentration camps including the Theresienstadt, Auschwitz, Christianstadt, Niesky and Görlitz.

Hyndráková is notable for her work on the educational films Butterflies Do Not Live Here (1958) and On Shoes, Braid and Dummy (1961), as well as her contributions in collecting stories from Holocaust survivors and advising on the curation of collections for the Jewish Museum in Prague.

== Life ==
=== Early life ===
Anna Hyndráková was born Kovanicová on 25 March 1928 in Prague. She grew up in Prague along with her parents and her sister. Her parents were both Jewish, her mother spoke Czech and German as did her father who also spoke Russian from his time as a POW in Russia during World War I. Hyndráková's father worked as a salesman selling perfumes while her mother was a stay-at-home mom.

Hyndráková's parents wanted her to learn English so that the family could emigrate out of Czechoslovakia before World War II. However after the Nazi occupation of Bohemia and Moravia in 1939, she wasn't accepted into the English-language grammar school, because admission of Jewish students was limited. In 1940 she enrolled in Jewish School for Religious Education, which was the only school left in Bohemia, where Jewish children were allowed to study.

=== Holocaust ===
In October 1942, Hyndráková, her parents, and other family members were sent to Theresienstadt. Here, Hyndráková worked as a powder box maker and dentist's assistant. Her family avoided being deported to Auschwitz on three separate occasions. In May 1944, Hyndráková and her parents were eventually transported to Auschwitz in a cattle truck. Before being split up and sent to a women's camp, Hyndráková lived with her family close to the gas chambers and the crematorium initially. After that, Hyndráková was transferred to the Christianstadt labor camp, where she toiled away hauling out stumps, felling trees, and shovelling sand. Hyndráková managed to escape the death march to Bergen-Belsen with two other women, in February 1945. When they were staying in a German farmer's house he informed the SS and they.

They were sent to a male-only labor camp at Niesky. Here, German and Polish prisoners forced the women to have sex with them. After three days they was transferred to Görlitz camp. Anna was coerced into another sexual relationship with a Jewish prisoner from Cologne. Hyndráková states, "I fought only a little, I no longer had the will or the strength," in describing this relationship.

In May 1945 German camp guards marched to the west with the captives with hope of turning themselves to the Americans, before the Red Army arrives. Hyndráková and other prisoners escaped during the night. She returned to Prague to her relatives on 11 May 1945. Her parents, sister and niece were murdered in Auschwitz in 1944. Her brother-in-law died during the death march in 1945.

=== After World War II ===
Hyndráková broke off the relationship with her partner from the camp, who offered to marry her. Her uncle implied she was in this relationship only for the favors the man was able to get her in the camp. Hyndráková's aunt and uncle weren't keen on letting her stay with them. She moved in with other relatives for a while, before moving to a Jewish orphanage. She studied graphic arts in secondary school. Hyndráková got married in 1949 and moved into a dorm for married students at a university. Prior to becoming a mother, Hyndráková was an artist for the Mechanization of Agriculture. She went on to study history at the University of Politics of the Central Committee of the Czechoslovak Communist Party.

After finishing her studies, she entered the Communist Party, but she began to witness the party's anti-Semitism in the 1950s and was expelled in 1969. She managed the Institute for the History of the Czechoslovak Communist Party's photo archive after giving birth, and subsequently the Jewish Museum's Holocaust documentation centre. Hyndráková also contributed to the political dissent by distributing Samizdat literature.

== Contributions to the Holocaust history ==
Anna's own accounts of the Holocaust are very valuable and provide nuanced descriptions of what life was like for young Jewish women surviving World War II. She gives extremely graphic accounts of sexual experiences she had at various camps. Hyndráková's accounts are particularly useful to historians because they offer a different perspective on the sexual encounters that Jewish women who survived the Holocaust had. Hyndráková characterises her sexual experiences as rape, while others used sex work as a tool to improve their circumstances.

Anna Hyndráková has helped to compile substantial work on the Holocaust, Holocaust survivors and their experiences. She aided in the compilation of extensive collections for the Jewish Museum in Prague focused on first hand accounts of the Holocaust by witnesses and survivors alike.

Anna Hyndráková was also an advisor on the educational films Butterflies Do Not Live Here (1958) and On Shoes, Braid and Dummy (1961). Both of these films center on artwork produced between 1941 and 1945 by Jewish kids living in the Theresienstadt Ghetto. Both films focus on the cultural significance of art in Jewish ghettos and briefly mention the therapeutic benefits of art for Jewish kids living in the cramped quarters.
