= Talmud-Torah School (Prague) =

Jewish religious school in Prague

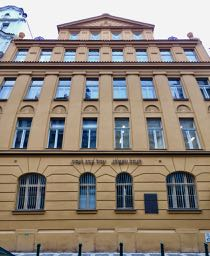

Location
- Jáchymova 3, Josefov, Prague 1; 50°5′18.95″N 14°25′8.78″E

Information
- Type: Studies of Talmud and Torah
- Established: 1908
- Closed: 1942
- Authority: Jewish Community of Prague
- Principal: Rabbi Haim Brody
- Principal: Rabbi Shimon Adler

The Talmud-Torah School (German: Talmud-Thora Schule) was a Jewish religious school in Josefov district in Prague, which operated between 1908 and 1942.

== History ==
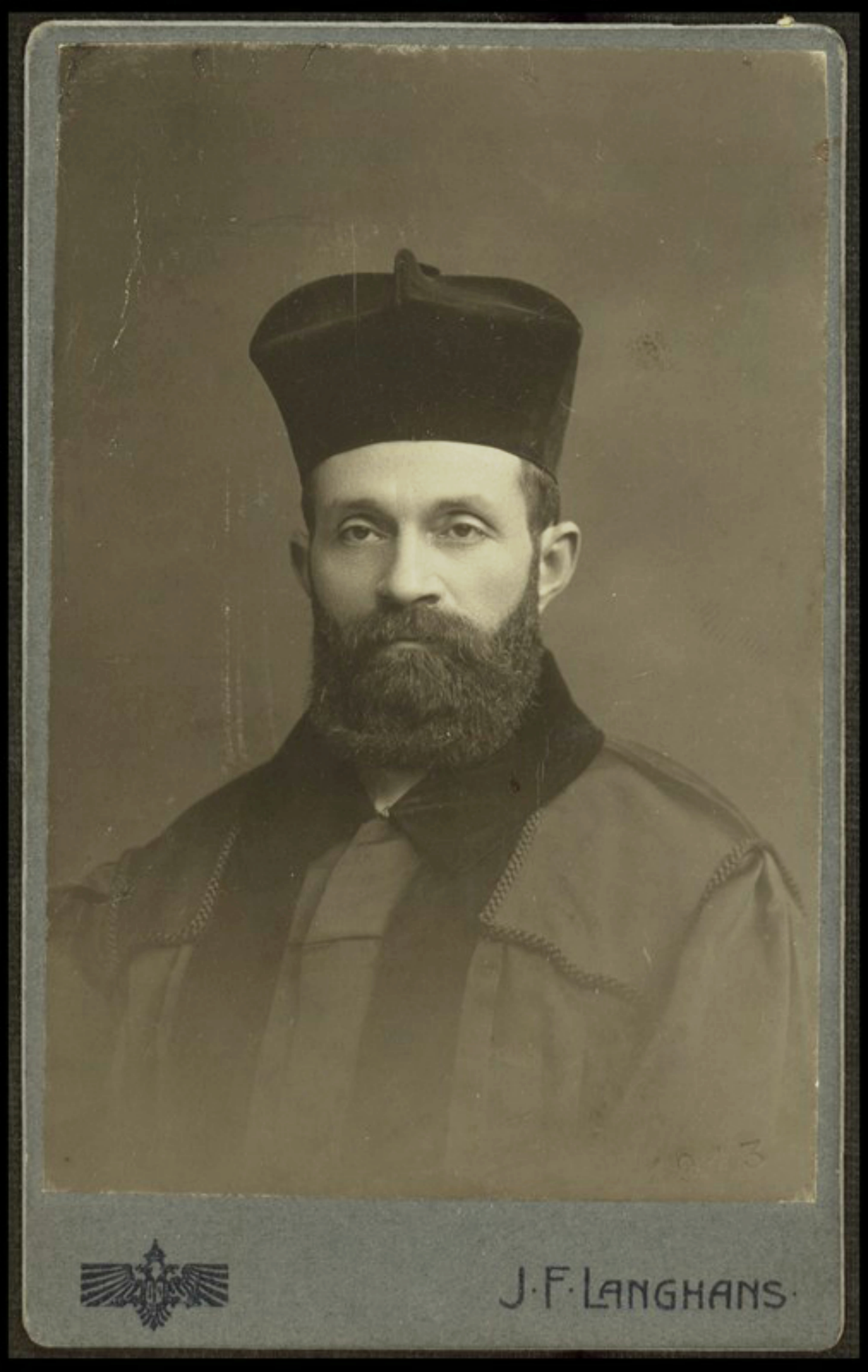
Rabbi Haim Brody, 1913

=== Talmud-Torah School (1908–1920) ===
The school was run by the Jewish Community of Prague. The director was the Chief Rabbi of Prague, who was directly appointed by the Jewish Community of Prague. Since 1905 the director of the school was Rabbi Haim Brody, who also lived in the school building. In 1925 he was succeeded by Rabbi Shimon Adler. Among the school's graduates were Hebrew scholar Otto Muneles or writer František R. Kraus. Kraus recorded his memories of the school in one of his books:

They attended the 'Talmud-Thora' religious school twice during a week, from four to six o'clock, and on Sunday morning. How noisy their class was! And after lessons, the whole of Jáchymova Street came alive. Hordes of boys ran amok, shouting, stamping, running, fighting exuberantly. And there was also 'bartering', stamps, pictures, advertisements, mirrors, marbles for balls, pencils for erasers, crystals for colouring books. (...) Jáchymovka seethed with youth. Furious football matches took place in the middle of the street. There would be five matches going on at once, pitch next to pitch. The goalposts were caps and coats strewn on the pavement. And on all sides a referee with a trilling whistle in his mouth. He managed to cover all the games at once - it was Egon Erwin Kisch.

— František R. Kraus, Kat beze stínu (2003) p. 22

=== School for Religious Education (1920–1942) ===
From the year 1920 the school was transformed to a religious elementary school - the new name of the school was "School for Religious Education". Max Brod was a guest speaker at the opening ceremony. Franz Kafka's sister Valli Pollak became one of the first female teachers there in 1920. In the 1930s, two branches of the school were established in Letná and Holešovice districts. The curriculum included Czech, German, mathematics and the other common subjects. A particular focus of the curriculum was on Jewish culture and history. Optional courses of Hebrew were offered in the higher grades. After the Nazi occupation of Czechoslovakia "Jáchymka" was the only school in Bohemia, which Jewish children were allowed to attend.

The school was closed in August 1942, when all the Jews were officially banned from getting education. The school building was then used to store the Jewish property confiscated by the Nazis.

=== Present ===
Currently, "Jáchymka" serves as the headquarters of the Terezín Initiative Institute, Jewish National Fund or sheltered workshop Becalel. The building also houses a permanent exhibition about the history of the school.

== Notable alumni ==
- Petr Ginz (1928–1944), writer and artist
- Anna Hyndráková (1928–2022), historian
- František R. Kraus (1903–1967), writer

== See also ==
- Talmud Torah
