= Josefov =

Town quarter and cadastral area of Prague, Czech Republic

- Cadastral Area of Prague
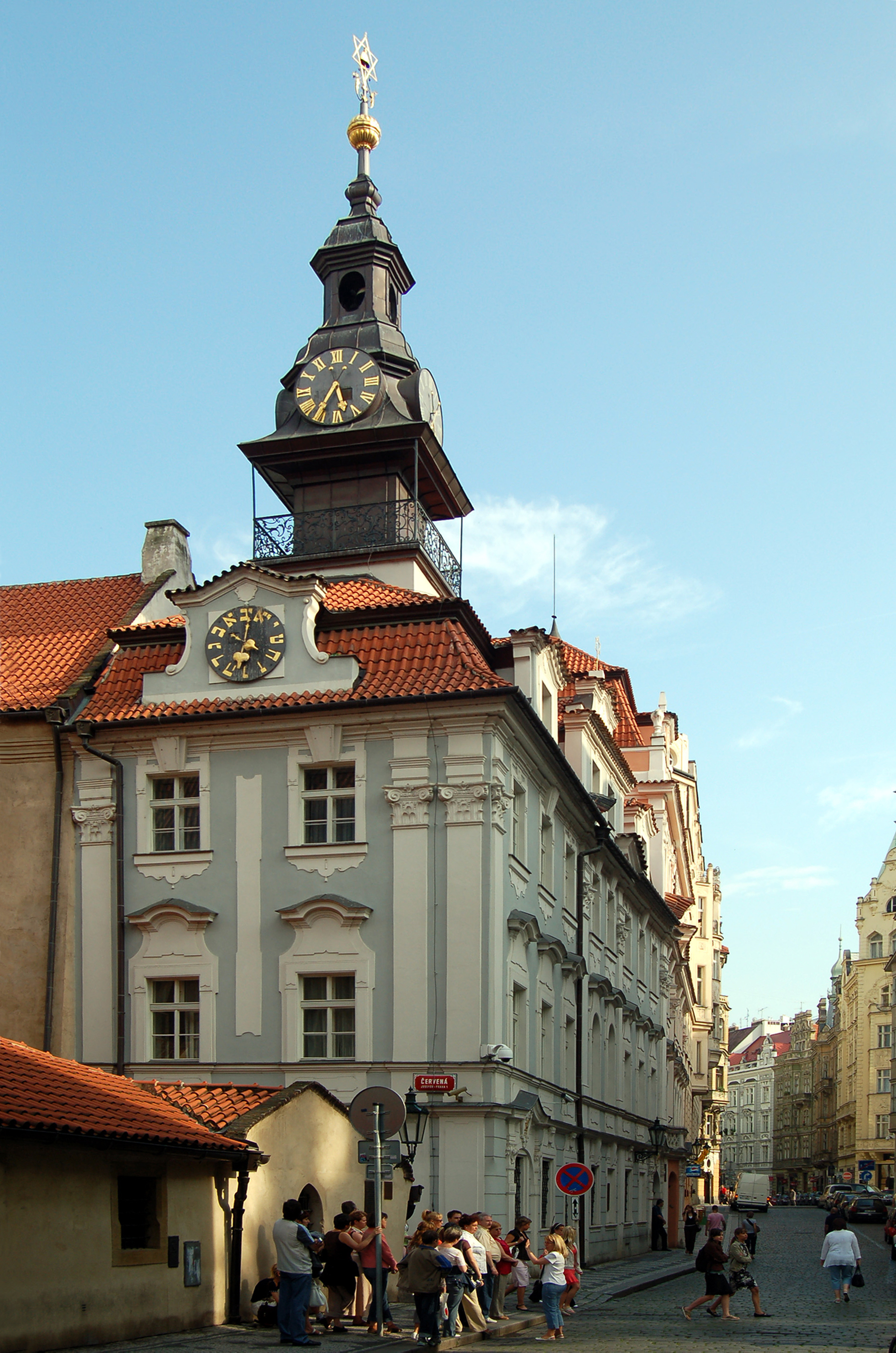
- Jewish town hall in Josefov

- Flag

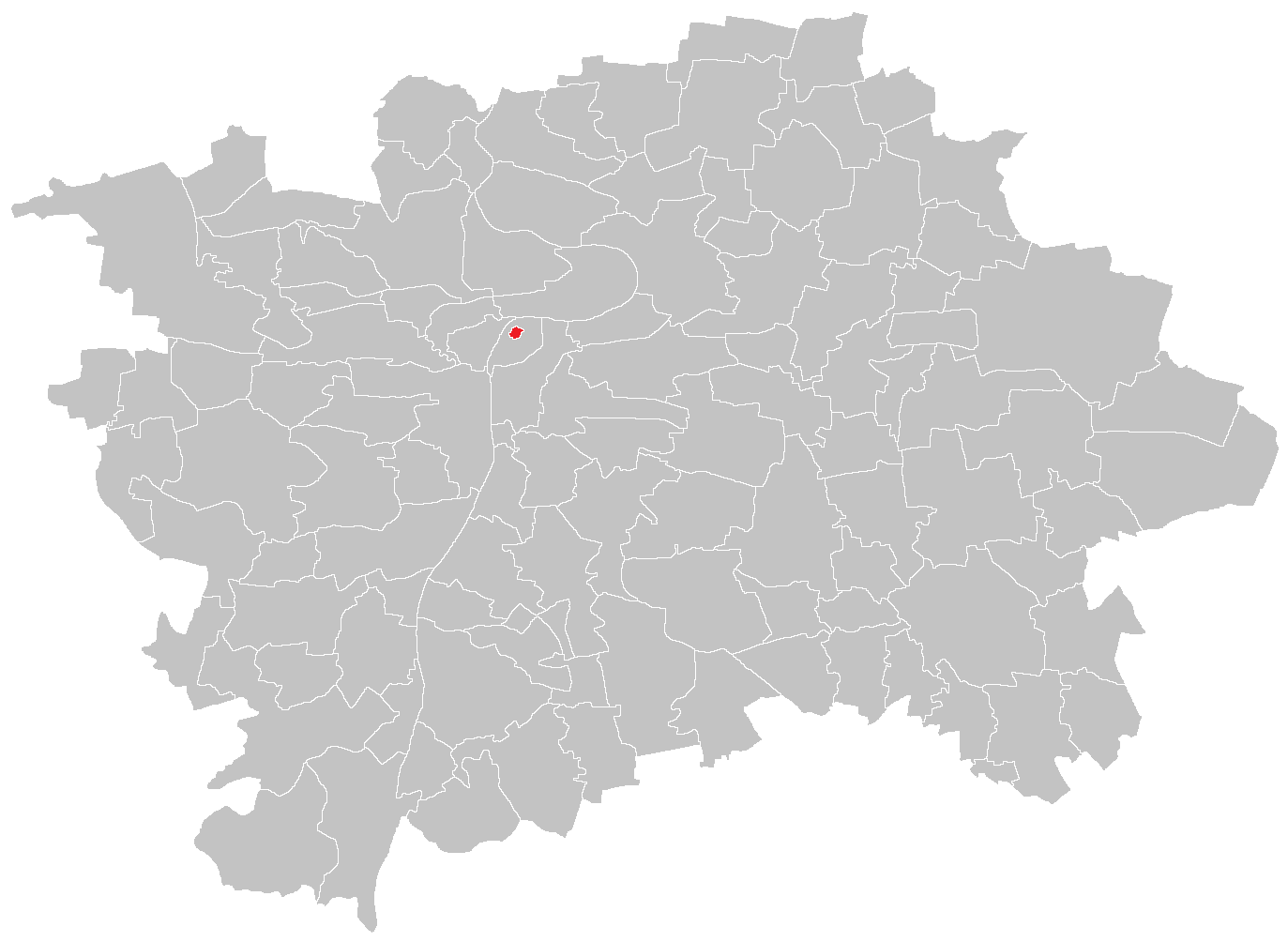
- Location of Josefov in Prague
- Coordinates: 50°05′23″N 14°25′07″E
- Country: Czech Republic
- Region: Prague
- District: Prague 1

Area
  - Total: 0.09 km^{2} (0.035 sq mi)

Population (2021)
  - Total: 977
  - Density: 11,000/km^{2} (28,000/sq mi)
- Time zone: UTC+1 (CET)
  - Summer (DST): UTC+2 (CEST)
- Postal code: 110 00

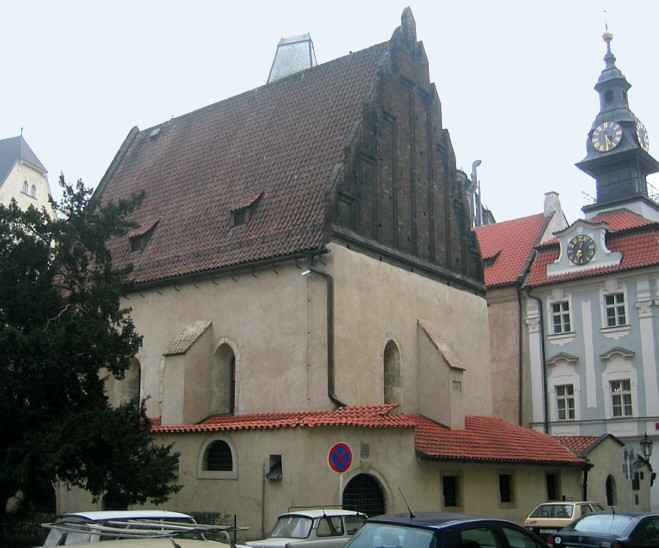
The Old New Synagogue

Josefov (also Jewish Quarter; German: Josefstadt) is a town quarter and the smallest cadastral area of Prague, Czech Republic, formerly the Jewish ghetto of the town. It is surrounded by the Old Town. The quarter is often represented by the flag of Prague's Jewish community, a yellow Magen David (Star of David) on a red field.

== History ==
Jews are believed to have settled in Prague as early as the 10th century. The first pogrom was in 1096 (the first crusade) and eventually they were concentrated within a walled Ghetto. In 1262, Přemysl Otakar II issued a Statuta Judaeorum which granted the community a degree of self-administration. The ghetto was most prosperous towards the end of the 16th century when the Jewish Mayor, Mordecai Maisel, became the Minister of Finance and a very wealthy man. His money helped develop the ghetto.

In 1850, the quarter was renamed "Josefstadt" (Joseph's City) after Joseph II, Holy Roman Emperor who emancipated Jews with the Edict of Tolerance in 1782. Two years before Jews were allowed to settle outside of the city, so the share of the Jewish population in Josefov decreased, while only Orthodox and poor Jews remained living there.

Most of the quarter was demolished between 1893 and 1913 as part of an initiative to model the city on Paris. What was left were only six synagogues, the old cemetery, and the Old Jewish Town Hall (now all part of the Jewish Museum in Prague and described below).

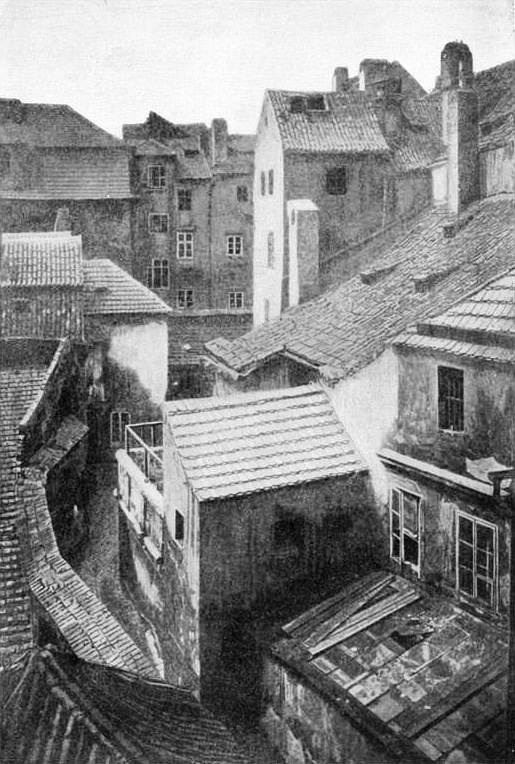
Narrow streets of the ghetto, demolished between 1893 and 1913

Currently Josefov is overbuilt with buildings from the beginning of the 20th century, so it is difficult to appreciate exactly what the old quarter was like when it was reputed to have over 18,000 inhabitants. Medieval Josefov is depicted in the 1920 film The Golem, composed of cramped, angular, squinted buildings, but this impression is used purely to convey the expressionist nature of the film.

== Demographics ==
Historical population

Year	Pop.	±%
1869	10,296	—
1880	10,668	+3.6%
1890	11,535	+8.1%
1900	9,047	−21.6%
1910	3,376	−62.7%
1921	4,070	+20.6%
1930	3,497	−14.1%
1950	3,077	−12.0%

Year	Pop.	±%
1961	3,679	+19.6%
1970	3,169	−13.9%
1980	2,769	−12.6%
1991	2,354	−15.0%
2001	1,997	−15.2%
2011	1,352	−32.3%
2021	977	−27.7%

Source: Censuses

== Historical sites ==
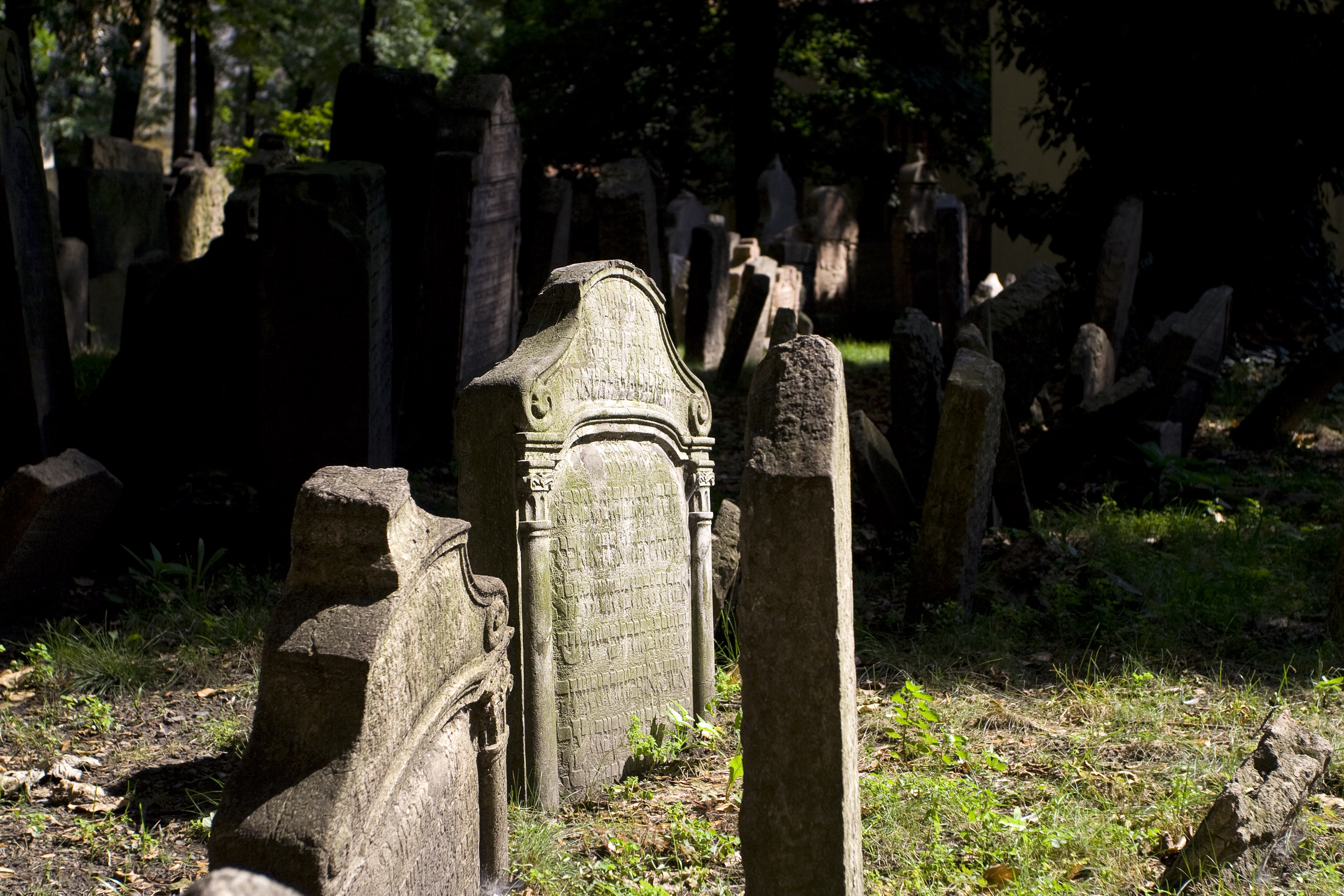
Old Jewish Cemetery, Prague

- Franz Kafka's birthplace.
- High Synagogue (Vysoká synagoga): 16th-century synagogue.
- Jewish Town Hall (Židovská radnice): 18th-century Rococo town hall.
- Klausen Synagogue (Klausová synagoga): 16th-century Baroque synagogue.
- Maisel Synagogue (Maiselova synagoga): 16th-century synagogue destroyed by fire, now used as a museum.
- Pinkas Synagogue (Pinkasova synagoga): 16th-century synagogue, now a memorial to Holocaust victims.
- Spanish Synagogue (Španělská synagoga): 19th-century synagogue with Moorish interior.
- Old Jewish Cemetery (Starý židovský hřbitov): 15th- to 18th-century cemetery. Europe's oldest surviving Jewish cemetery.
- Old New Synagogue (Staronová synagoga): 13th-century Gothic synagogue.
- Ceremonial Hall of the Prague Jewish Burial Society (Obřadní síň): 20th-century neo-Renaissance hall.

== Gallery ==
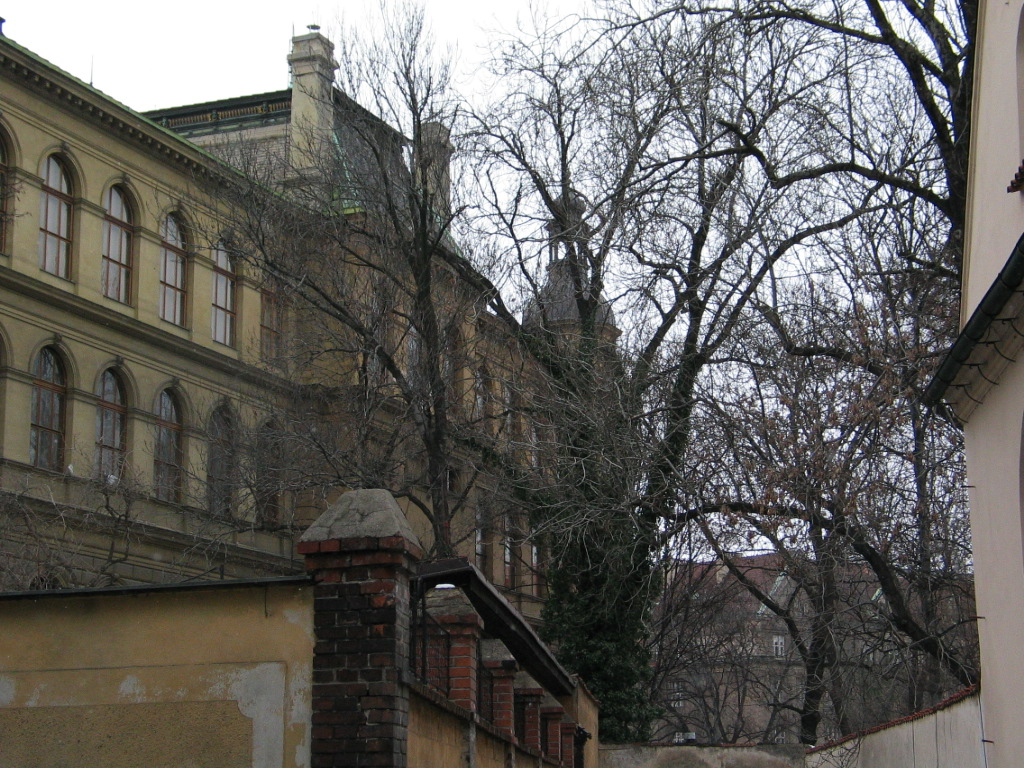
Jewish Cemetery and surrounding buildings

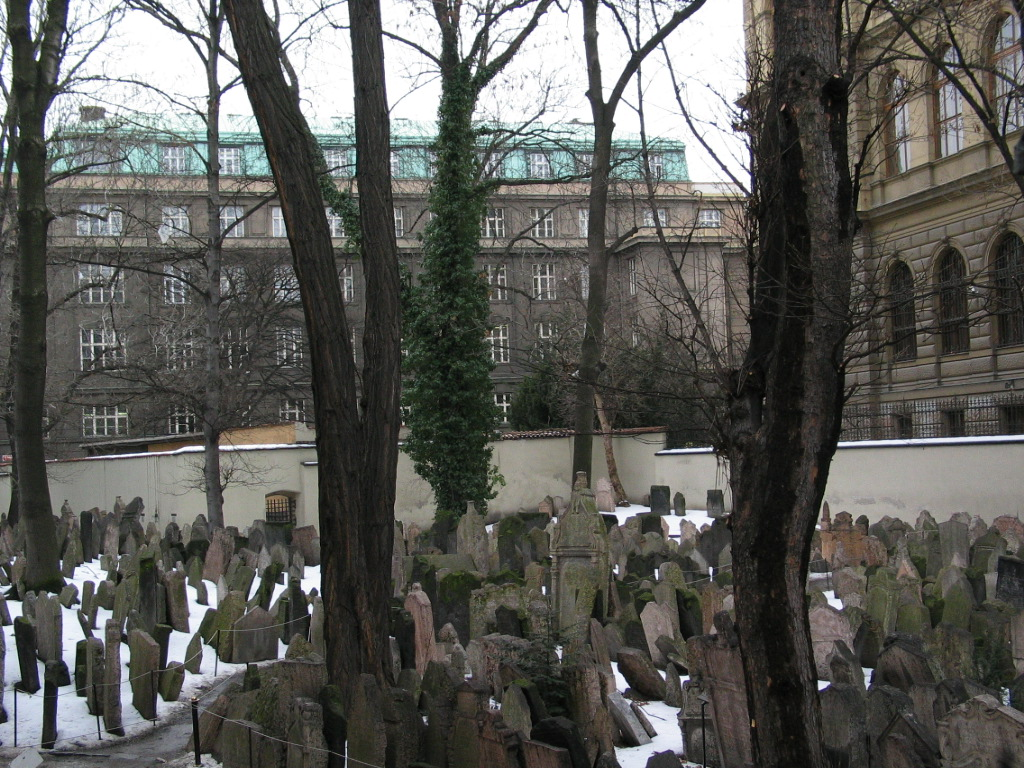
The cemetery itself

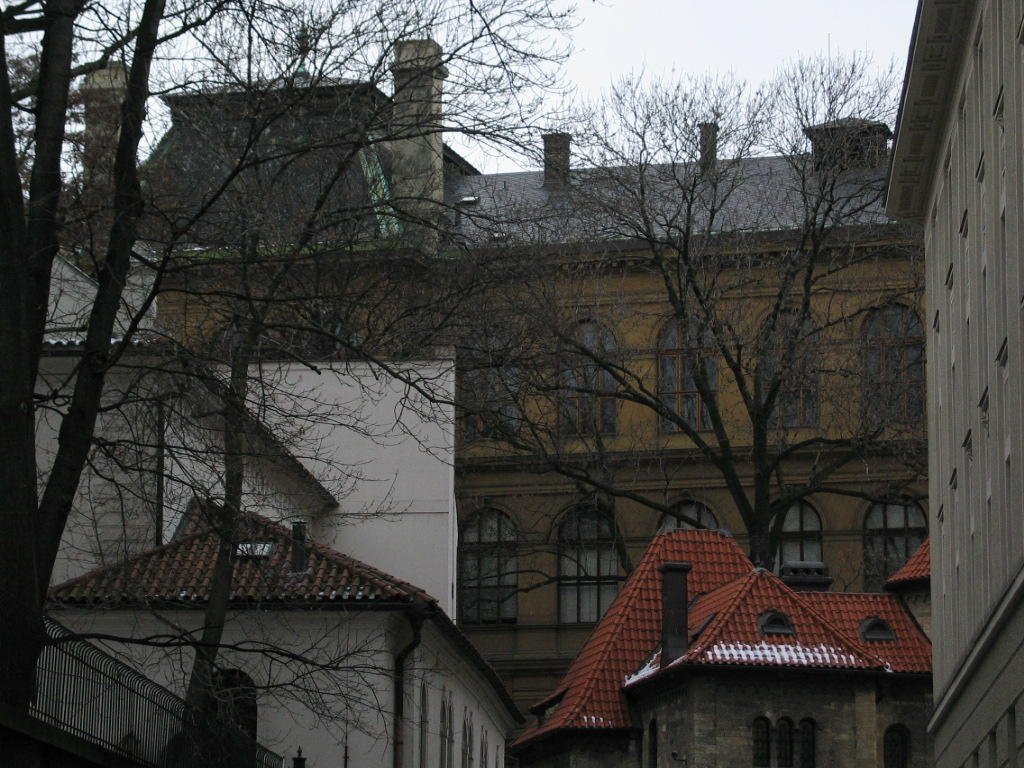
The surrounding buildings

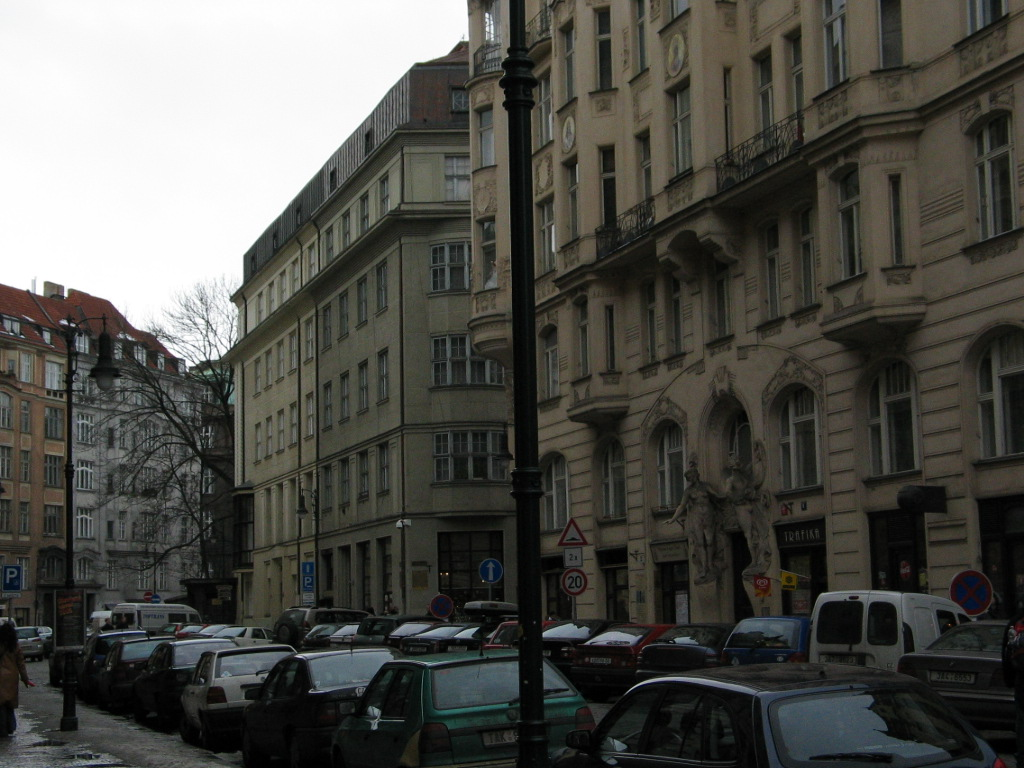
A few steps apart

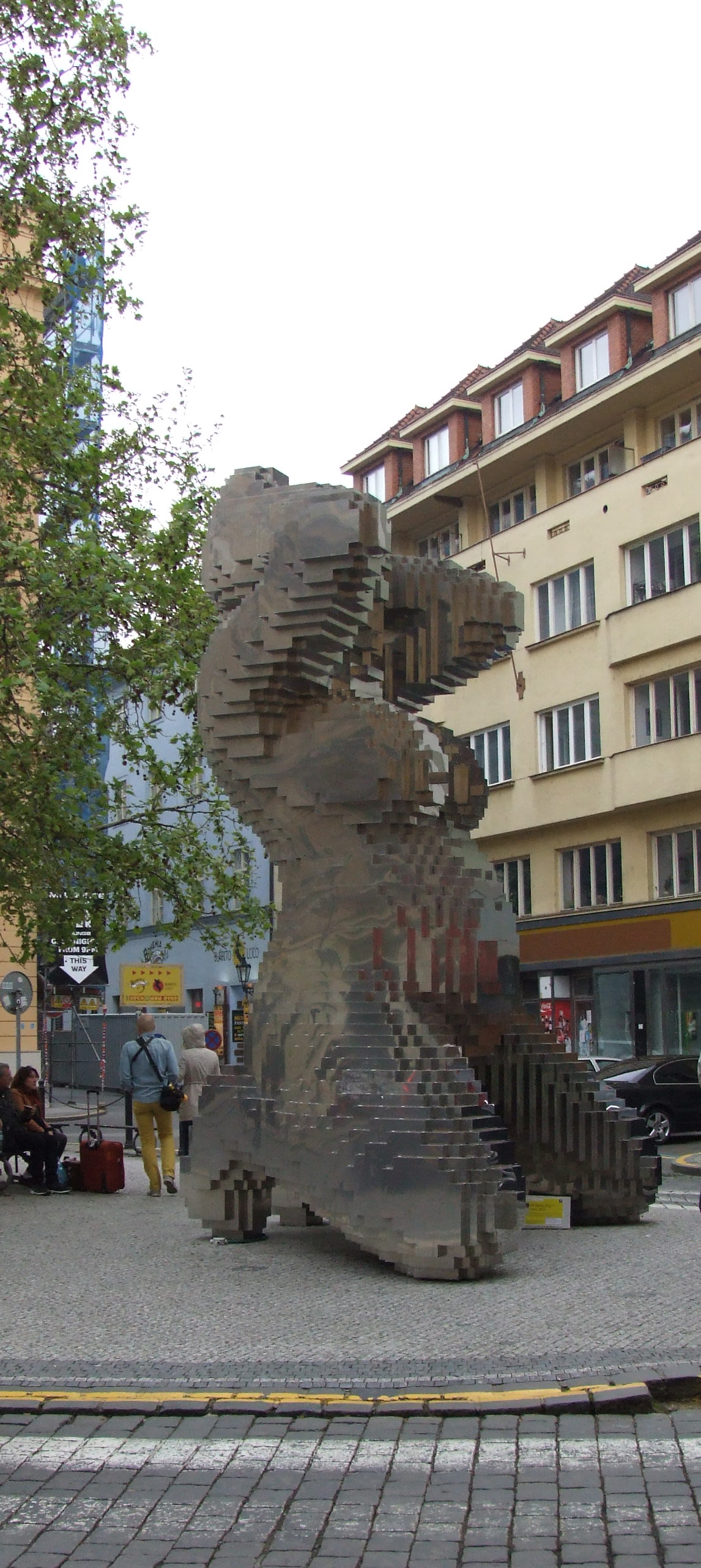
A monument of a pregnant woman made of mirrors

== See also ==
- History of the Jews in Prague
