= Leo Pavlát =

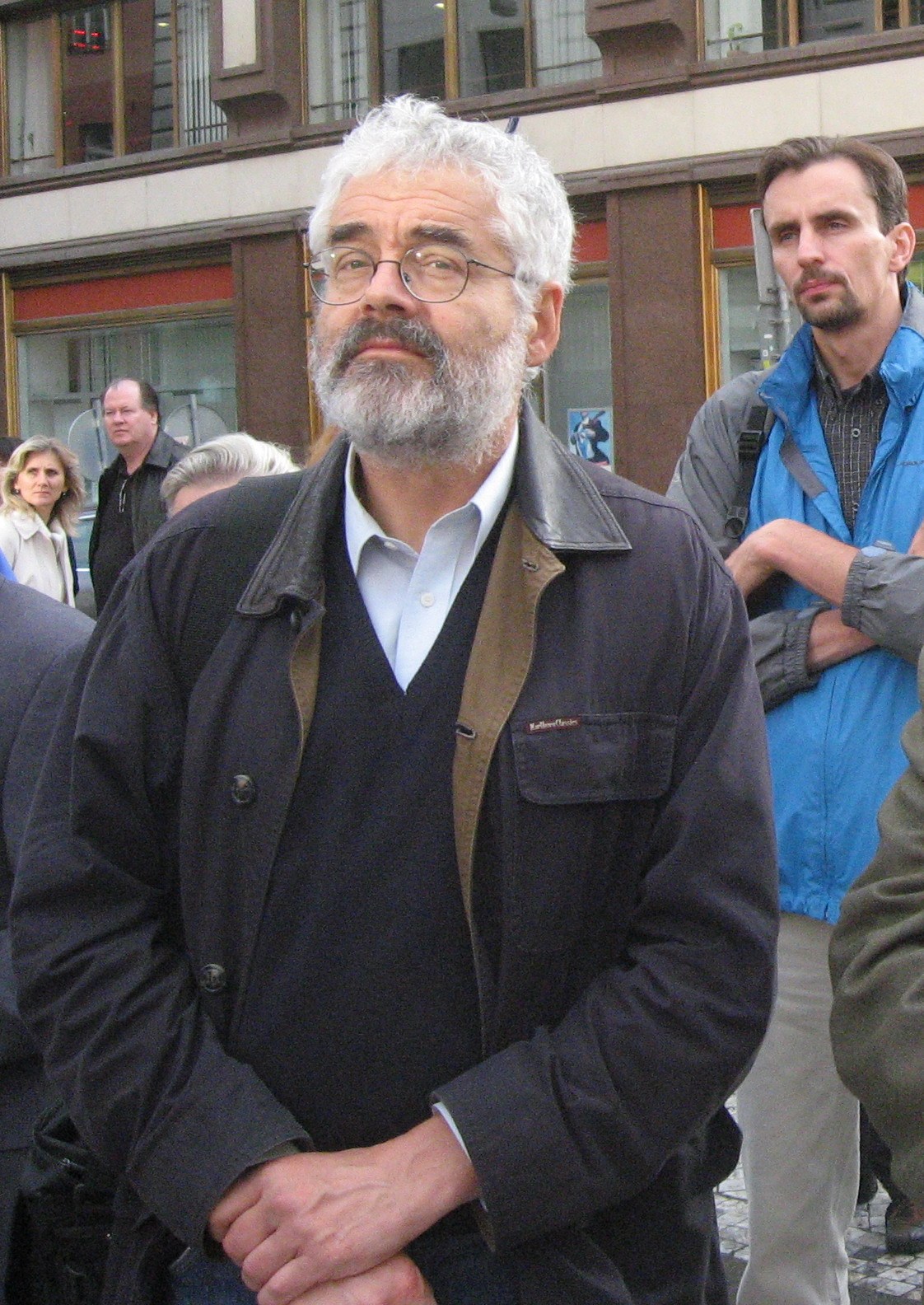
Leo Pavlát

PhDr. Leo Pavlát (9 October 1950 in Prague) is a Czech Jewish journalist, writer and diplomat. Since 1994, he is the director of the Jewish Museum in Prague.

== Work ==
=== Books ===
- Tajemství knihy (1982)
