= Kloyz =

Ashkenazi Jewish house of study and worship in 16th to 19th centuries

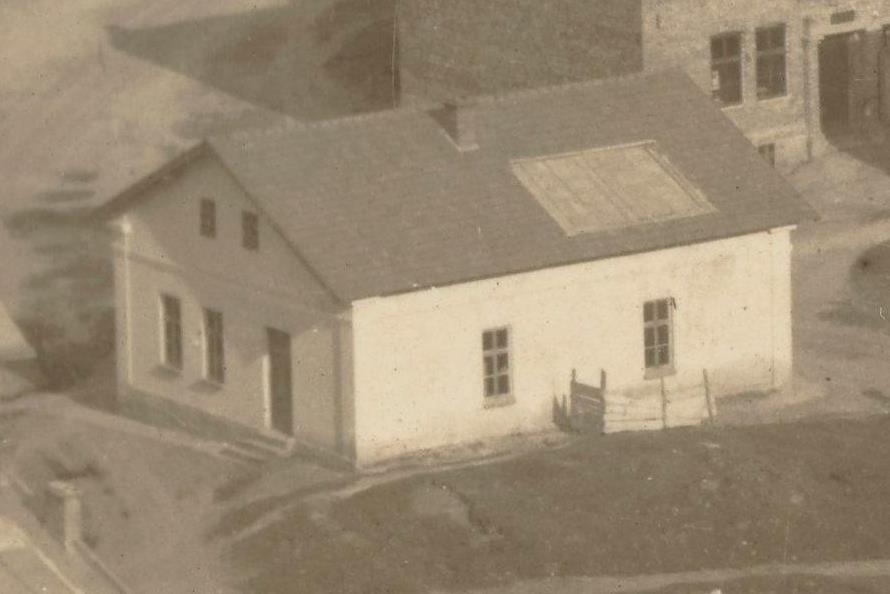
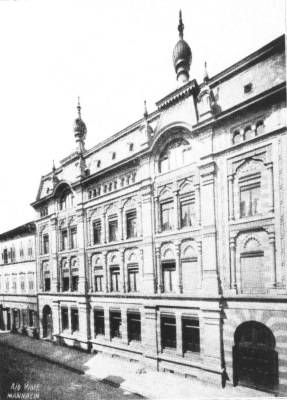
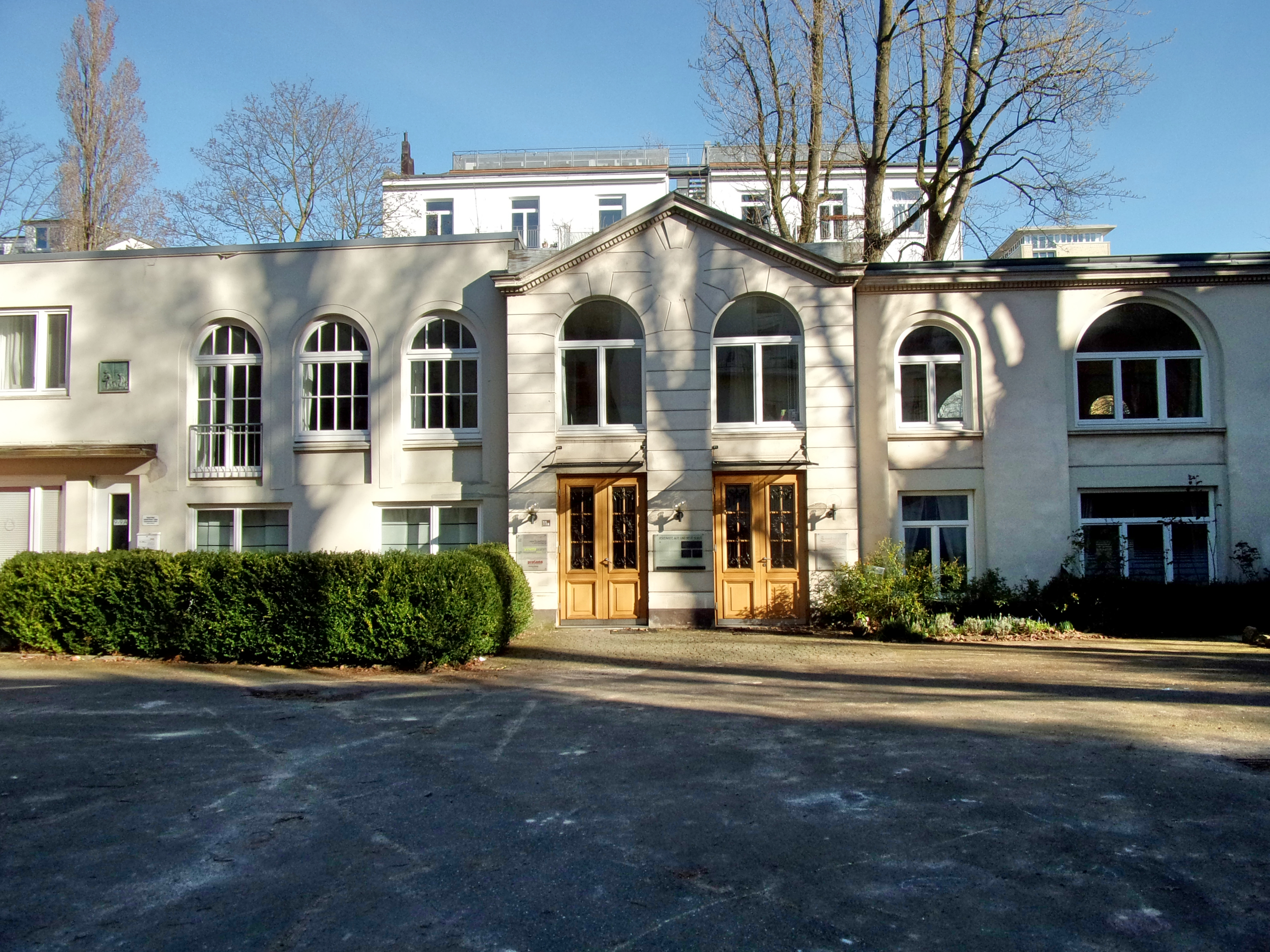
A collection of kloyzn throughout Europe.
Left to right, from top:
Terebovlia, Ukraine
Mannheim, Germany
Hamburg, Germany

A kloyz (pl. kloyzn; Yiddish: קלויז) or a hesger (pl. hesgerim) was an Ashkenazi, Ottoman, or Italian Jewish house of study and worship popular during the 16th to 19th centuries. It is closely related to a beth midrash, though the two are different in the fact that unlike the often-public batei midrash, kloyzn were private and often regarded as elite institutions.

== Etymology ==
The Yiddish term kloyz is derived from the German-language term die Klaus (pl. die Klausen), itself derived from the Latin term claustrum or clausum (lit. "secluded place"), defining a building or complex of structures relating to a monastery.

== History ==
Kloyzn first began to emerge during the 16th century in the Polish–Lithuanian Commonwealth, around the same time as their equivalent, hesgerim, in the Ottoman Empire and the Italian Peninsula. The concept of the kloyz grew out of the idea of the beth midrash and the decline of yeshivot, as the concept of a meeting place for a select few elite scholars.

Kloyzn, which have been regarded by groups such as YIVO as elitist, were selective in their choice of membership. Typically financed by philanthropists or wealthy families, members prided themselves not simply on their halakhic knowledge, but on their esoteric knowledge (primarily the kabbalah) as well. They were recognised by communities as responsible for matters of rabbinic literature outside of typical discussion.

=== Decline ===
As urban Jewish communities in Europe secularised during the late 18th and early 19th centuries, the kloyz fell out of favour with these communities. These changes resulted in a lack of money, and, as the prestige of Jewish councils declined across Europe, kloyzn had effectively disappeared by the time of the early 1800s, though in some instances, they remained until at least the early 20th century. During the late 19th and early 20th centuries, synagogues associated with the Musar movement were known as kloyzn, but aside from the name, there was no connection to actual kloyzn.

== Activity and structure ==
Kloyzn were active at all times of the week, excluding the period from mid-day on Friday to the subsequent Sunday morning. By one account of the Lesko kloyz, members were only allowed three hours of sleep daily, unless they had not slept in over 24 hours, in which case they were allowed six hours of sleep. The rest of the time spent at the kloyz was dedicated to study of literature.

Each kloyz was relatively small, numbering at ten to twenty members each. The number of students was larger, and included young men preparing to serve as rabbis and teachers. Study within a kloyz was often complicated, and sometimes reflective of the life of the kloyz's members. The authority of the kloyzn peaked in the mid- to late 18th century, during which time they were regarded as a significant authority in Jewish communities. Many public documents in this time period were signed by some or all members of the kloyzn. A significant incident occurred in Brody when the local kloyz joined in the excommunication of Hasidic Jews.

== See also ==
- Klausen Synagogue
