= Jewish Museum in Prague =

Museum in Czech Republic

- Židovské muzeum v Praze
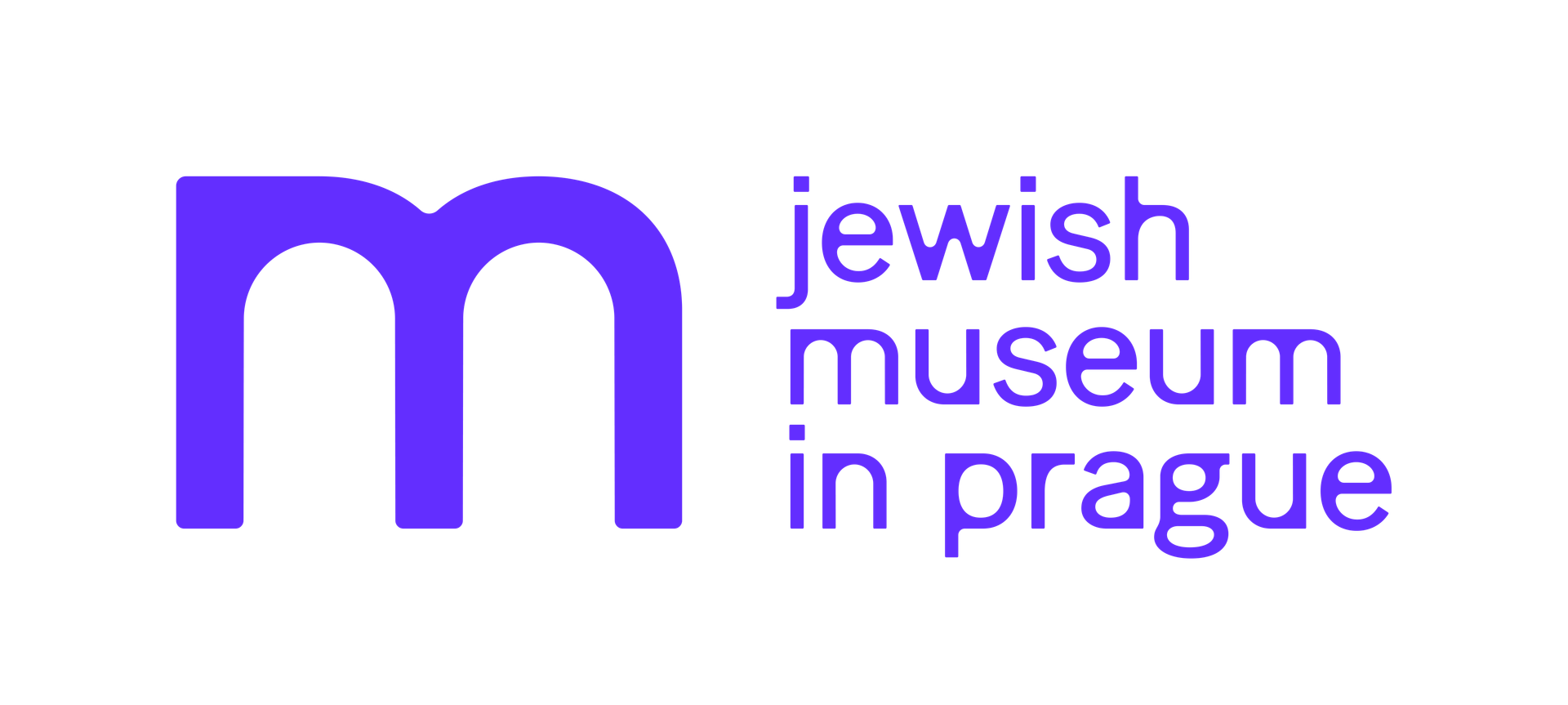

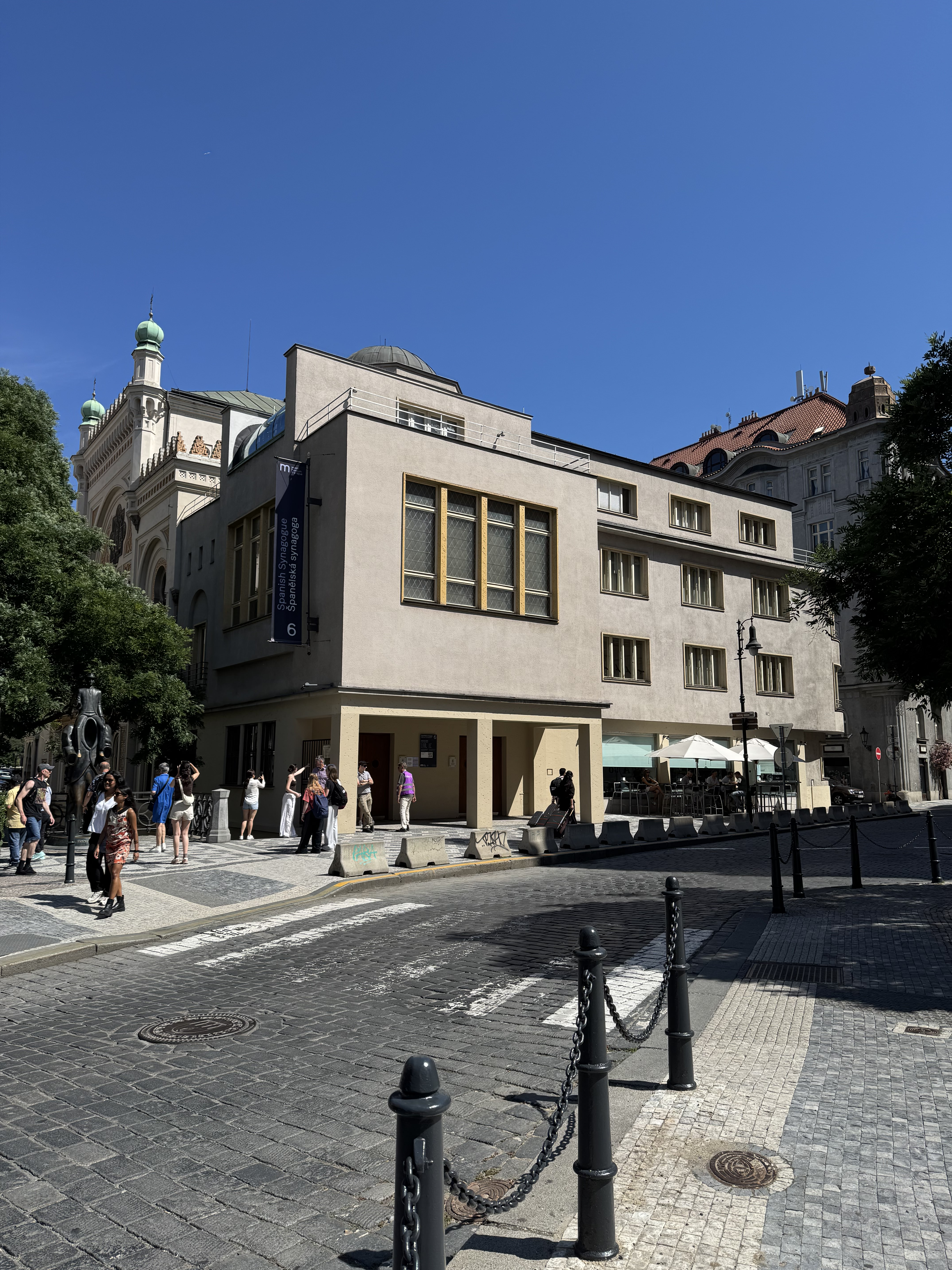
- The Jewish Museum in Prague administers several historic sites and exhibitions in Josefov, the former Jewish Quarter of Prague. JMP
- Established: 1906
- Location: U Staré školy 141/1, Prague 1, Czech Republic, 110 00
- Coordinates: 50.090336°N 14.421119°E
- Visitors: 549.288 (2025)
- Director: Pavla Niklová
- Website: http://www.jewishmuseum.cz/en/info/visit/

The Jewish Museum in Prague (Czech: Židovské muzeum v Praze) is one of the oldest Jewish museums in Europe. Established in 1906, it preserves and presents the Jewish cultural heritage of Bohemia and Moravia. Its collections include more than 44,000 collection objects, 130,000 books, and an extensive archive documenting the history of Jewish communities in the Czech lands.

== History ==
=== Foundation and development (1906–1939) ===
The museum was founded in 1906 by the historian Salomon Hugo Lieben (1881–1942) and August Stein (1854–1937), a representative of the Czech-Jewish movement and a city councillor. At the core of its collection were items from synagogues that had been demolished as a result of the clearance of the Prague Jewish ghetto, which was demolished in an urban renewal campaign at the beginning of the 20th century.

=== During Nazi occupation (1939–1945) ===
After the Nazi occupation of Czechoslovakia and the establishment of the Protectorate of Bohemia and Moravia, the Jewish Museum Association was abolished in the autumn of 1939. Its collection was taken over by the Prague Jewish community. In 1942, on the initiative of Karel Stein, head of the department for rural affairs, the Central Jewish Museum was established. The Nazis approved the project after lengthy negotiations, although they pursued different aims from its initiators. Under the cover name "museum", the Central Jewish Museum became a repository for liturgical objects, books and archival documents from defunct Jewish communities. Thanks to the efforts of the art historian and chief curator cs:Josef Polák and his colleagues, the institution continued operating during the war.

=== After the war (1945–1994) ===
Around 77,297 Czech Jews were killed during the Second World War and so afterwards there was almost nobody to claim the confiscated objects preserved in the Museum. Endowed with a new vocation, ensuing from the historical fact of the Holocaust, the Museum re-established its activity on 13 May 1945, under the administration of Jewish Religious Communities Council and under the leadership of Hana Volavková. Its first exhibition after the War took place on 26 June 1945. Among the personalities who worked here were the poet and scholar H. G. Adler who rescued many priceless documents from the Theresienstadt Ghetto for the Museum.

On 25 February 1948, after less than three years of post-war freedom, the Communists staged a coup d'état and took over the government of Czechoslovakia. Out of the Communist regime's initiative, the Jewish Museum became state property on 4 April 1950 and its name was changed respectively to the State Jewish Museum. During the Communist dictatorship, until its fall in November 1989, the raison d’être of the Museum was constantly disputed on ideological grounds. The topics seemingly related to the "campaign for peace and against fascism" (favourite clichés of the Communists) were allowed. Nevertheless, pretensed campaign against another adversary, Zionism, restrained the functioning of the Museum nearly to the point of preclusion, regarding research, exhibiting, publishing and cooperation with foreign experts alike. Curators were not allowed to have contact with Judaica curators abroad. Moreover, activity of the Museum was followed closely by the state organs. However, the concern of the state did not include conditions of the Museum collections and buildings. Jewish themes were suppressed.

=== Post 1989 ===
In 1994, in the wake of the 1989 Velvet Revolution, the buildings used by the Museum, as well as the Old Jewish Cemetery, returned to the possession of the Jewish Community of Prague and the Museum's collections were restituted to the Federation of Jewish Communities as the legal successor of the ceased Jewish Communities. In the same year, Leo Pavlát became the director of the successively re-established Jewish Museum in Prague.

In 1994, the museum buildings were returned to the Prague Jewish community, while the bulk of the collections were returned by the state to the Federation of Jewish Communities in the Czech Republic. On 1 October 1994, the museum regained its independence from the state. Leo Pavlát served as director from 1994 to 2023. Pavla Niklová became director on 1 July 2023.

== In the present ==
The museum administers several historic sites and visitor facilities in Josefov:

- Maisel Synagogue
- Pinkas Synagogue
- Spanish Synagogue
- Klausen Synagogue
- Ceremonial Hall of the Prague Jewish Burial Society
- Old Jewish Cemetery
- ARTSCHUL, formerly Robert Guttmann Gallery, currently under reconstruction
- Archive situated in the Smíchov Synagogue

In the present, the Jewish Museum in Prague operates as a non-state institution. It administers historic sites, permanent exhibitions, collections, a library and an archive, and is one of the key institutions dedicated to preserving Jewish cultural heritage in Bohemia and Moravia. Its permanent exhibitions present the history, culture and traditions of Jews in the Bohemian lands, as well as the memory of the Shoah. In 2025, the museum recorded 549,288 visitors.

The Ceremonial Hall is currently undergoing reconstruction. From 1997 to 2024, it hosted an exhibition on Jewish burial customs. The reconstruction aims to restore the building's original form and make new exhibitions accessible to visitors.

In addition to maintaining its historic sites and exhibitions, the museum carries out research, documentation and educational activities. It publishes the scholarly journal Judaica Bohemiae, works on the documentation of Jewish communities in Bohemia and Moravia, and provides educational programmes for schools, teachers and the general public.

== Judaica Bohemiae ==
Since 1965, the museum has published the peer-reviewed academic journal ''Judaica Bohemiae'', dedicated to the study of Jewish history and culture in Bohemia, Moravia and other countries of the former Habsburg Monarchy from the Middle Ages to the present. The journal publishes articles in English and German and is indexed in international scholarly databases, including Scopus and the Arts and Humanities Citation Index.

== Exhibitions ==
The museum maintains permanent exhibitions in several historic sites in Josefov. These exhibitions present the history of Jews in the Bohemian lands from the 10th to the 18th centuries, the history of Jews in the Bohemian lands in the 19th and 20th centuries, the memorial to the victims of the Shoah from the Czech lands in the Pinkas Synagogue, and an exhibition of children's drawings from the Terezín Ghetto from 1942 to 1944.

The museum has also loaned its collections to other institutions. The Terezín Ghetto drawings were exhibited at the New School Art Center in 1967. In 1983, part of the museum's collection went on a four-year tour of Canada and the United States as a special exhibition, The Precious Legacy.

== Books ==
- The Jewish Museum of Prague: A Guide Through the Collections, Hana Volavková, Umělecká beseda, 1948
- Jewish Art Treasures from Prague: The State Jewish Museum in Prague and Its Collections : a Catalogue, Charles Reginald Dodwell, Whitworth Art Gallery, 1920
- The Precious Legacy: Judaic Treasures from the Czechoslovak State Collections, David Altschuler, Vivian Mann, Simon & Schuster 1983
- Magda Veselská: Archa paměti: Cesta pražského židovského muzea pohnutým 20. stoletím [The Memory Ark: The Path of the Prague Jewish Museum through the Eventful 20th Century], Academia: Prague, 2013, ISBN 978-80-200-2200-4

== Notable people ==
Leo Pavlát served as director from 1994 to 2023. Pavla Niklová became director on 1 July 2023.

== See also ==
- History of the Jews in Prague
