= Klausen Synagogue =

Former synagogue in Prague, in the Czech Republic

- Czech: Klausová synagoga Yiddish: קלויז שול
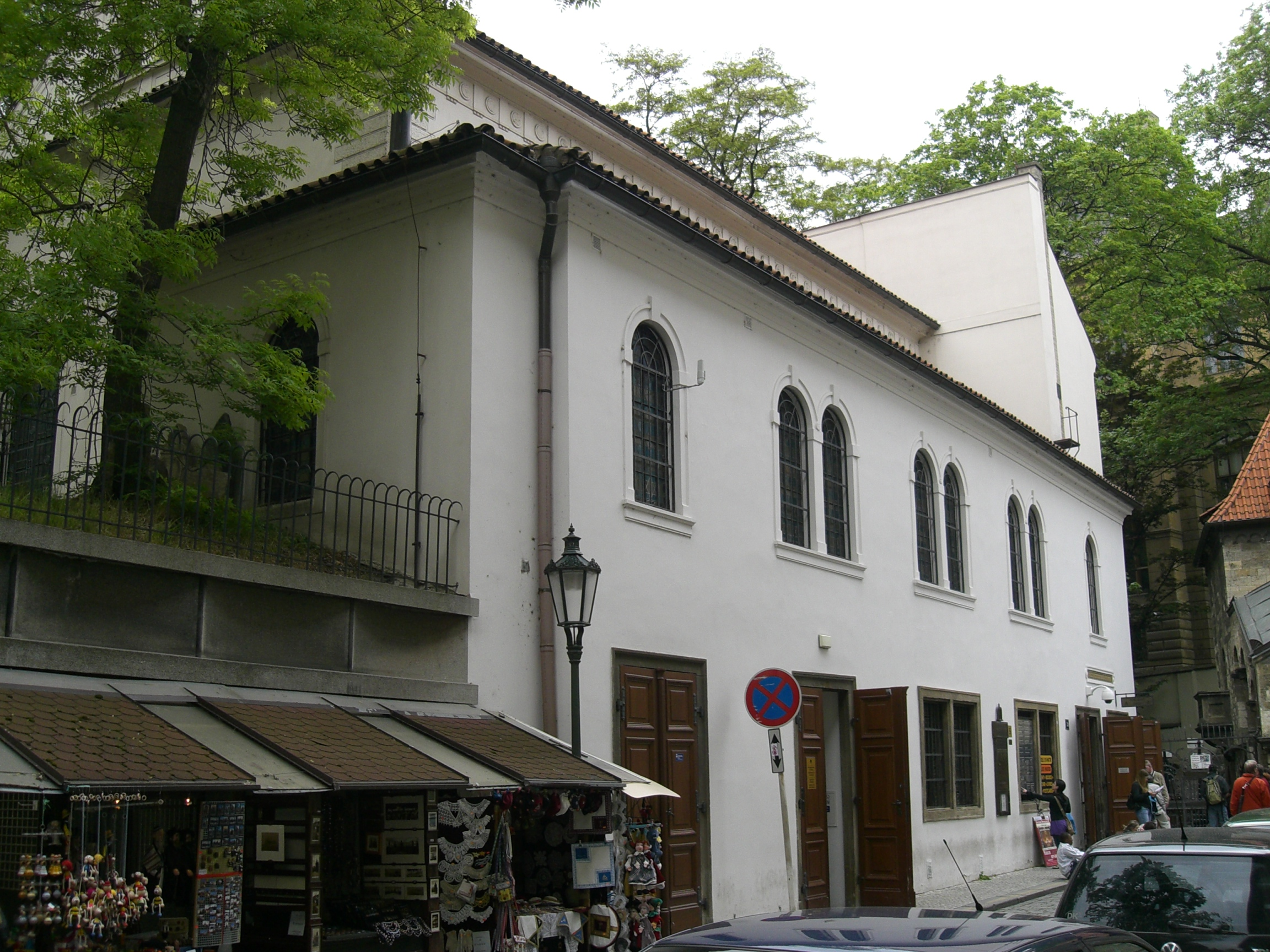
- The former synagogue adjacent to the Old Jewish Cemetery

- Location of the former synagogue, now museum, in the Czech Republic

Religion
- Affiliation: Judaism (former)
- Ecclesiastical or organizational status: Synagogue (1884–1939); Jewish museum (since 1984)
- Status: Closed (as a synagogue); Repurposed

Location
- Location: Prague
- Country: Czech Republic
- Interactive map of Klausen Synagogue
- Coordinates: 50°05′24″N 14°25′02″E

Architecture
- Architect: Bedřich Münzberger
- Type: Synagogue architecture
- Style: Baroque
- Established: 1570s (as a congregation)
- Completed: 1884

The Klausen Synagogue (Czech: Klausová synagoga, Yiddish: קלויז שול, romanized: kloyz shul) is a former Jewish synagogue located in Prague, in the Czech Republic.

The congregation was established in the 1570s, and the synagogue was completed in 1884, after an earlier synagogue, built in the early Baroque style in the Jewish ghetto, was destroyed. In 1984 the former synagogue was permanently repurposed as a Jewish museum and is administered by the Jewish Museum in Prague.

== History ==
=== 16th and 17th century synagogues ===
In 1570s a renowned businessman and benefactor of the ghetto, Mordechai Maisel, decided to build in the area of the present Klausen Synagogue a kloyz, or complex of buildings, probably including synagogues and a private Talmudic school. The famous Prague rabbi and scholar Maharal taught at this school. In 1689, the great fire of the ghetto burned down all the kloyzn and the synagogue is named after them.

Rabbi Shelomo Khalish Cohen, of the burned down synagogue, which had been part of the complex, then initiated construction of a new synagogue in early Baroque style at the site. In 1694, the building was finished and two years later monumental three-tiered aron ha-kodesh, the Torah Ark, was added, thanks to the endowment of Samuel Oppenheimer, an affluent and influential personality of the Austrian monarchy, part of which Prague was at the time. Many important rabbis, for example Elazar Fleckeles, are also connected with the synagogue.

=== Modern times ===
In 1883–84, the synagogue was reconstructed by an architect Bedřich Münzberger, who also partook in decorating the Spanish Synagogue. Massive urban renewal of the ghetto at the turn of the 20th century left the Klausen Synagogue intact, while other baroque synagogues such as the Zigeuner, Great Court and New Synagogue were demolished. Nowadays, the Klausen Synagogue is thus the only example of a baroque synagogue in the former ghetto.

During World War II a depository as well as an exposition was located in the synagogue. As soon as one year after the war, an exposition about Jewish festivals and customs was opened there. The synagogue was reconstructed in years 1960, 1979–81 and 1983 (aron ha-kodesh only). In 1984, a new permanent exhibition of Hebrew manuscripts and early prints was opened.

On 11 October 2024, the synagogue held a Kol Nidre service, led by Rabbi David Maxa of the Czech community of Progressive Jews, for the first time since World War II.

== Recent history and exposition ==
About a decade later, during years 1995–96, the synagogue was restored again and the topic of Jewish festivals and customs returned to the exposition. Visitors are invited to get acquainted with the foundational texts of Judaism (Torah and Talmud), sacral space of Judaism (traditional components of the synagogue interior, order of synagogue prayer service and texts and objects used during it, etc.). Introduction of Jewish Festivals and Jewish family life in its dailiness as well as in its important milestones, for instance birth, circumcision, wedding, etc. follows. The exposition continues in the Ceremonial Hall with the topic of the end of life.

== Gallery ==
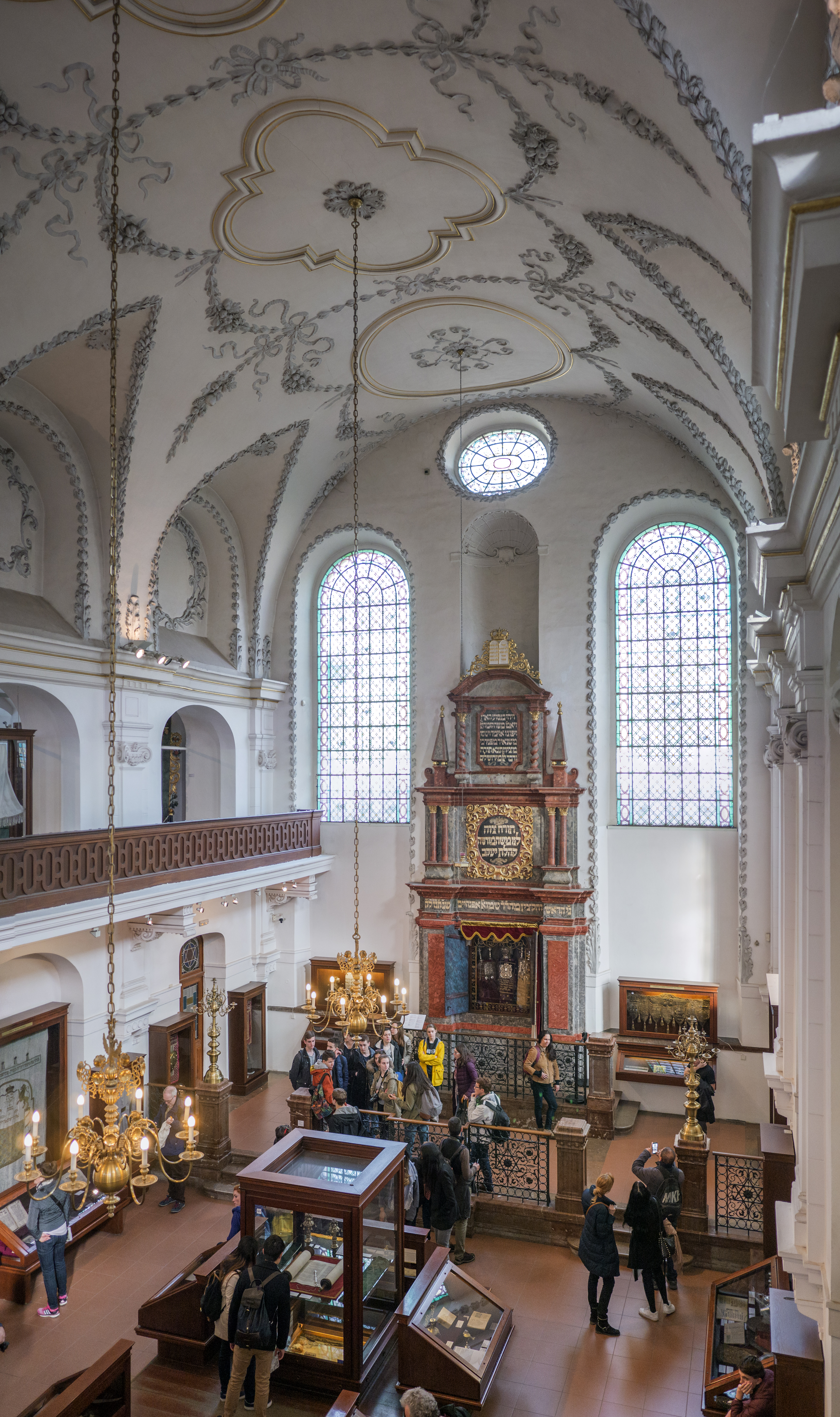
The interior today

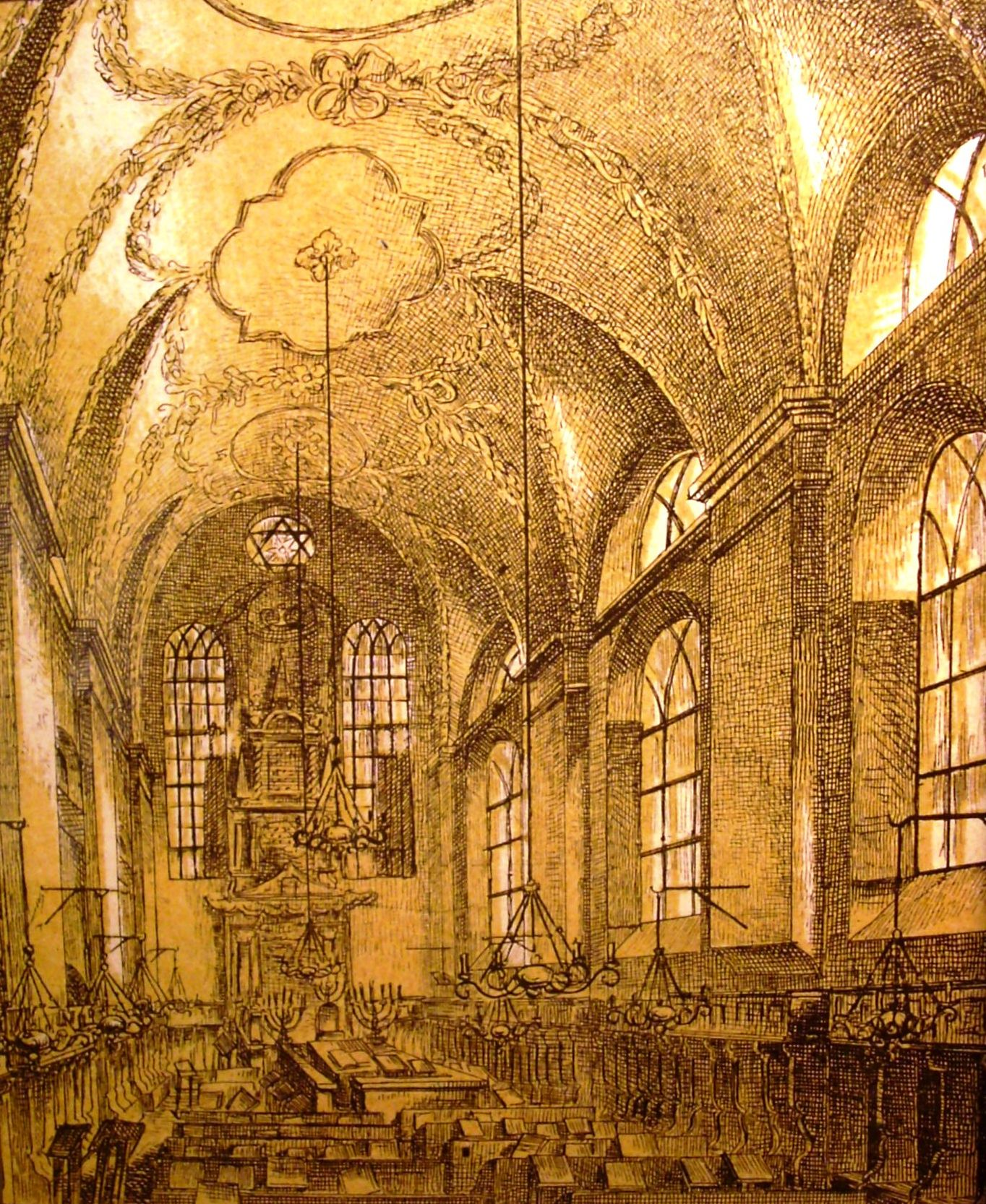
The interior of the synagogue in the 19th century

== See also ==
- History of the Jews in the Czech Republic
