= Federation of Jewish Communities in the Czech Republic =

- Headquarters: Prague
- Region served: Czech Republic
- Website: www.fzo.cz/en/

The Federation of Jewish Communities in the Czech Republic (Czech: Federace židovských obcí, FŽO) is an umbrella organization representing Czech Jews, both religious and secular. In addition to representing 10 Jewish communities in the Czech Republic, the federation also represents several Jewish organizations.

== About ==
The federation is headquartered in Prague and represents 10 Jewish communities in the Czech Republic; the Jewish communities of Brno, Karlovy Vary, Liberec, Olomouc, Ostrava, Plzeň, Prague, Teplice, Ústí nad Labem, and Děčín. The federation is active in opposing antisemitism in the Czech Republic and supporting the State of Israel. Around 3,000 people are registered members of the federation, with around 1,400 living in Prague. Most of the 15,000 to 20,000 Jews in the Czech Republic are not affiliated with the federation or any other official Jewish organization.

== History ==
A 2021 report from the federation reported an increase in antisemitism during the COVID-19 pandemic. 98% of all reported antisemitic incidents were on the internet and the federation concluded that Czech Jews were largely safe compared to some other European countries.

== See also ==
- History of the Jews in the Czech Republic
