= Ceremonial Hall of the Prague Jewish Burial Society =

Coordinates: 50.0900°N 14.4170°E

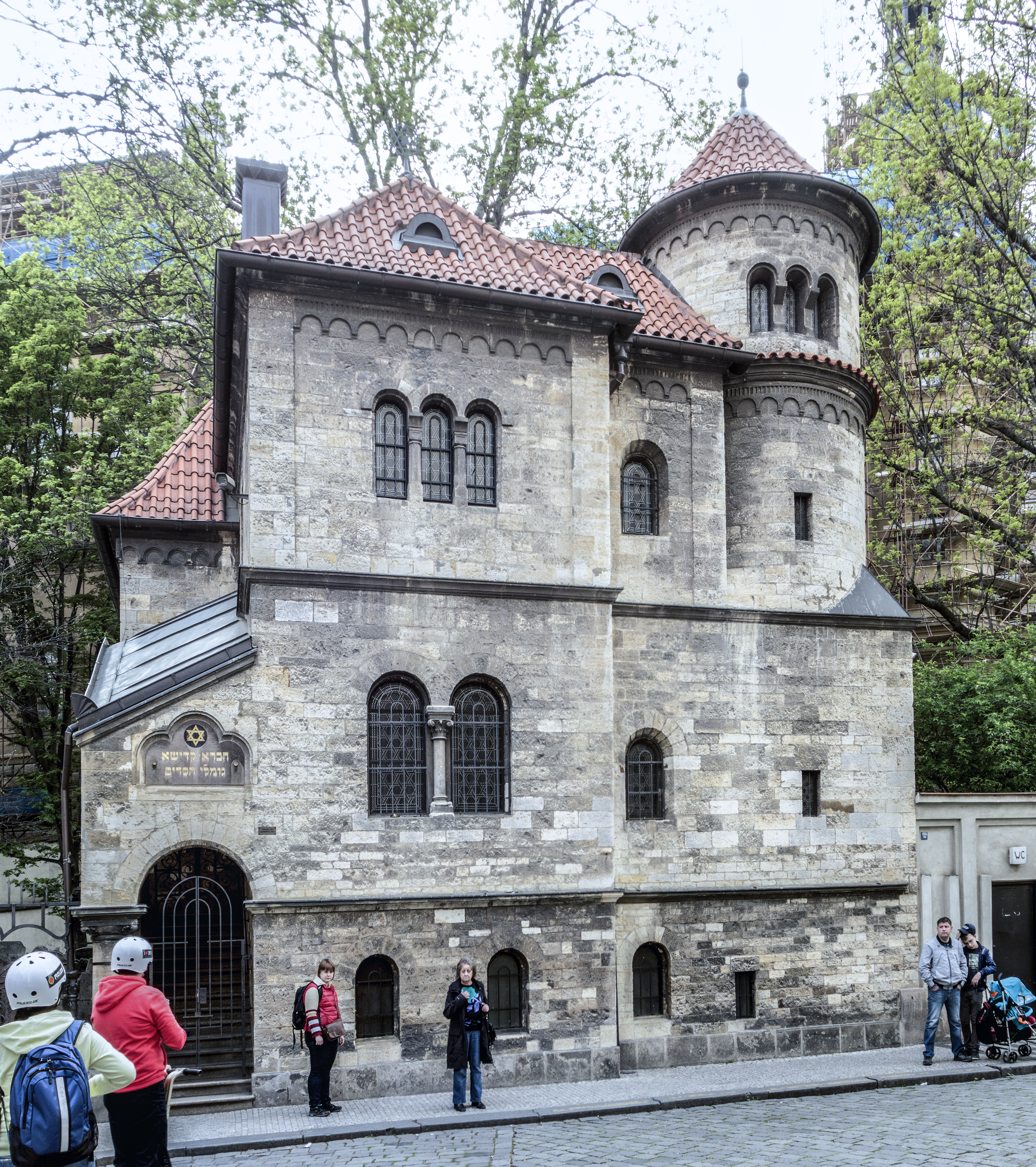
Ceremonial Hall of the Prague chevra kadisha

The Ceremonial hall of the Prague Jewish Burial Society was built for the last service to the deceased members of the Prague Jewish Community. It is used as an exhibition space administered by the Jewish Museum in Prague. The building is an excellent example of Romanesque Revival architecture.

== History ==
The present Ceremonial Hall has replaced an older building serving the same purpose. It was constructed by A. Gabriel and J. Gerstel between 1906 and 1908. Its appearance, including the details like the bases and capitals of columns, the grille and the door, holds to the Romanesque Revival style. As long as the Prague chevra kadisha (Jewish Burial Society) used the space, the morgue was in the basement, on the first floor there was a room for the ritual purification of the dead (taharah) and on the second floor there was a meeting room, where the Society held its meetings as well as annual banquets. Since World War I the Burial Society has not used the hall for its original purpose. In 1926 the Society rented the building to the Jewish Museum in Prague, which has used it ever since.

== Today ==
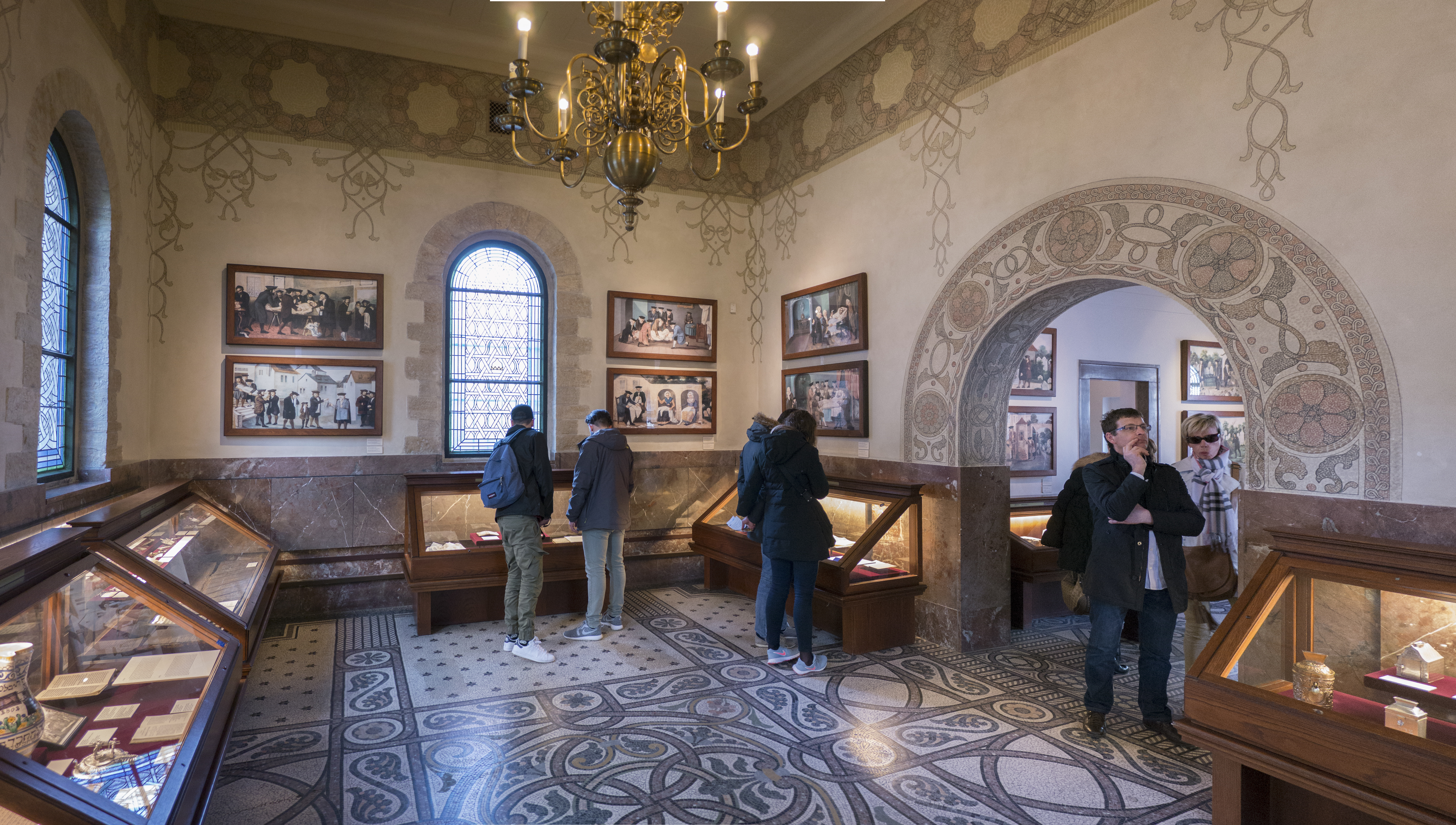
Interior of the Ceremonial Hall

In 1997 the Ceremonial Hall was reconstructed. The exposition which was opened there at the time is linked with the original usage of the space, introducing visitors to Jewish rituals held over the dying and the deceased (thus the exposition about the important milestones of Jewish life from the Klausen Synagogue is continued there), providing them with information about the Old Jewish Cemetery and other cemeteries in the Czech lands and the institution of the Prague Jewish Burial Society.

== Jewish Burial Society cycle of paintings ==
An important monument left by the Burial Society to posterity is a cycle of fifteen paintings, depicting rituals and customs performed by the Burial Society. An anonymous author fulfilled the order of the Society from around the year 1772 and followed the Baroque painting style. However, the motive of the Society, which hired him, originated probably from the new, enlightened, age: in keeping with the enlightened ideology it was supposed to show an important social role, which the Society had maintained for centuries. The paintings also depict the final period of the history of the Old Jewish Cemetery which makes the cycle more valuable.

== Sources ==
- PAŘÍK, Arno a Vlastimila HAMÁČKOVÁ, Pražské židovské hřbitovy = Prague Jewish Cemeteries = Prager jüdische Friedhöfe, Praha: Židovské muzeum v Praze, 2008, s. 15 a 71.
- Ceremonial Hall – Official website administered by the Jewish Museum in Prague.
