= M-Palace =

- M-Palác
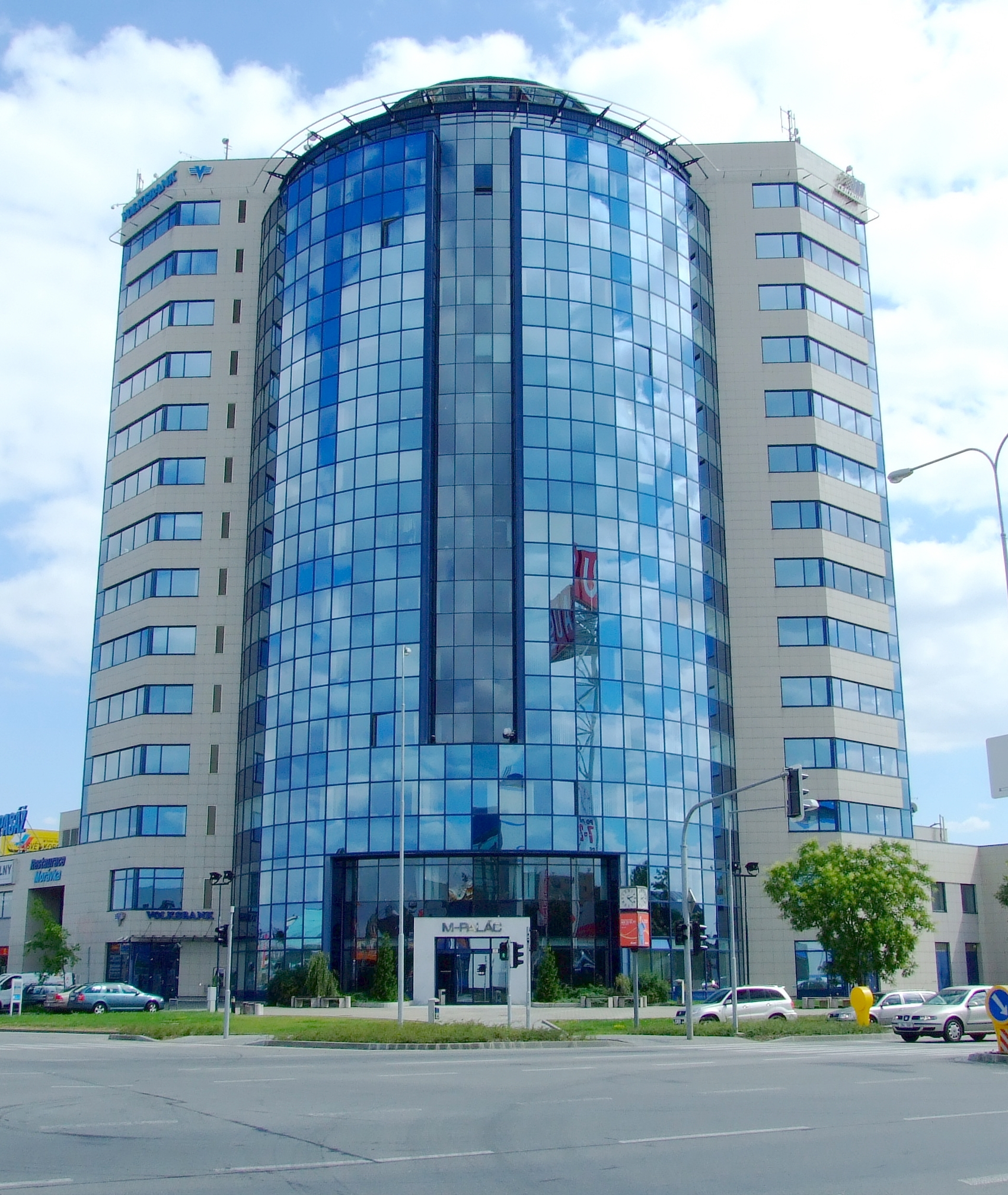
- Interactive map of the M-Palace area

General information
- Status: Completed
- Type: Office
- Architectural style: Postmodern
- Location: Brno, Czech Republic
- Coordinates: 49°10′37.940″N 16°36′16.432″E
- Construction started: 1994
- Completed: 1997
- Opening: 1997

Height
- Height: 60 m (200 ft)

Technical details
- Floor count: 16
- Floor area: 17,133 m^{2} (184,420 sq ft)

Website
- www.mpalac.cz

M-Palace (Czech: M-Palác) is a high-rise building in Brno, Czech Republic. The building is 60 meters high and it is one of the tallest buildings in Brno. The building consists of a sixteen-floors tower and two-floors building. The tower is mainly used for offices and in the two floors building is a shopping mall. There is a restaurant on the top floor of the tower with a panoramic view of the city. Construction of the building was started in 1994 and the building was opened in 1997. The building is located on Heršpická street. In the near of the building are located AZ Tower and Spielberk Towers.

== Gallery ==
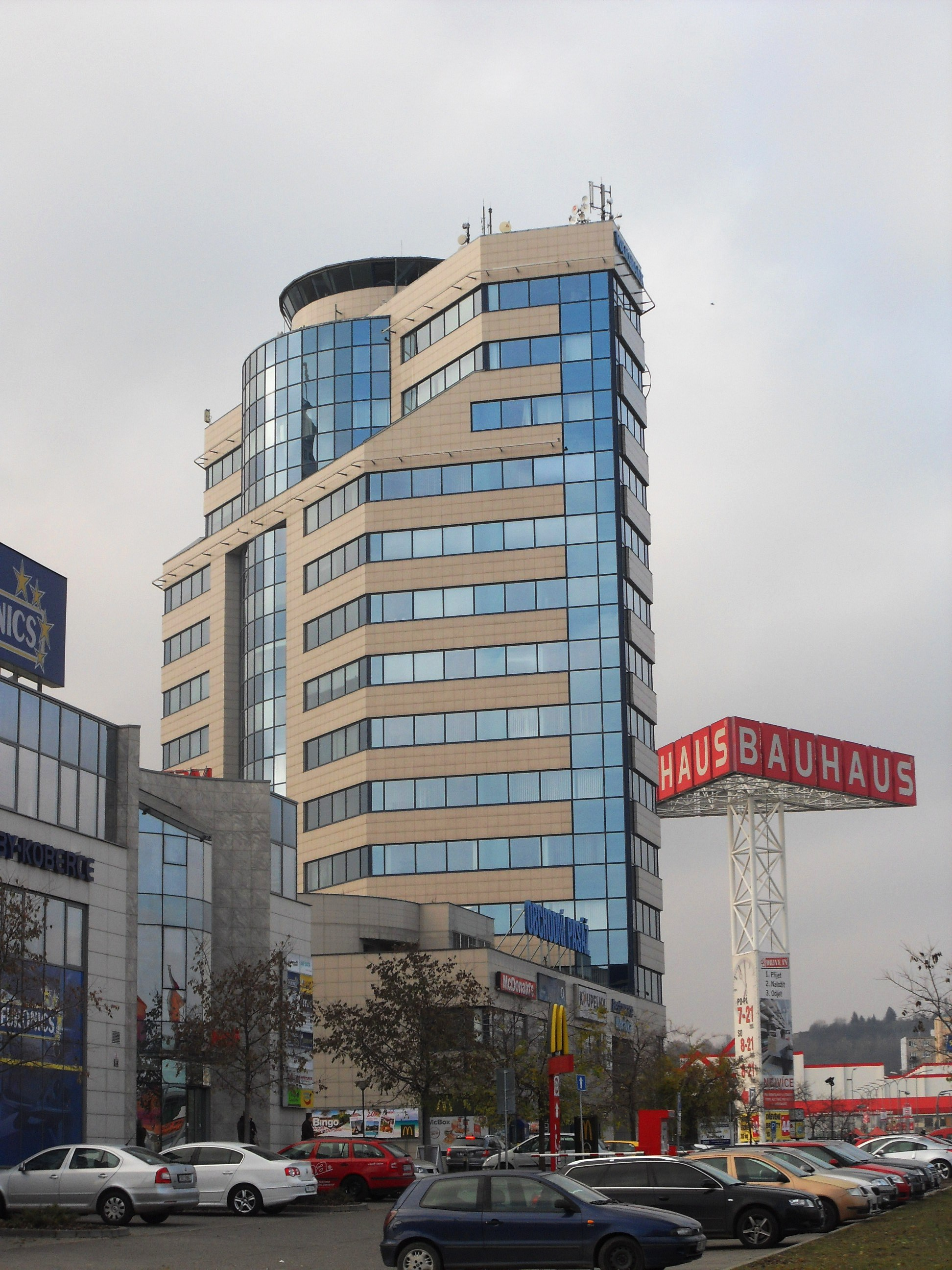
M-Palace

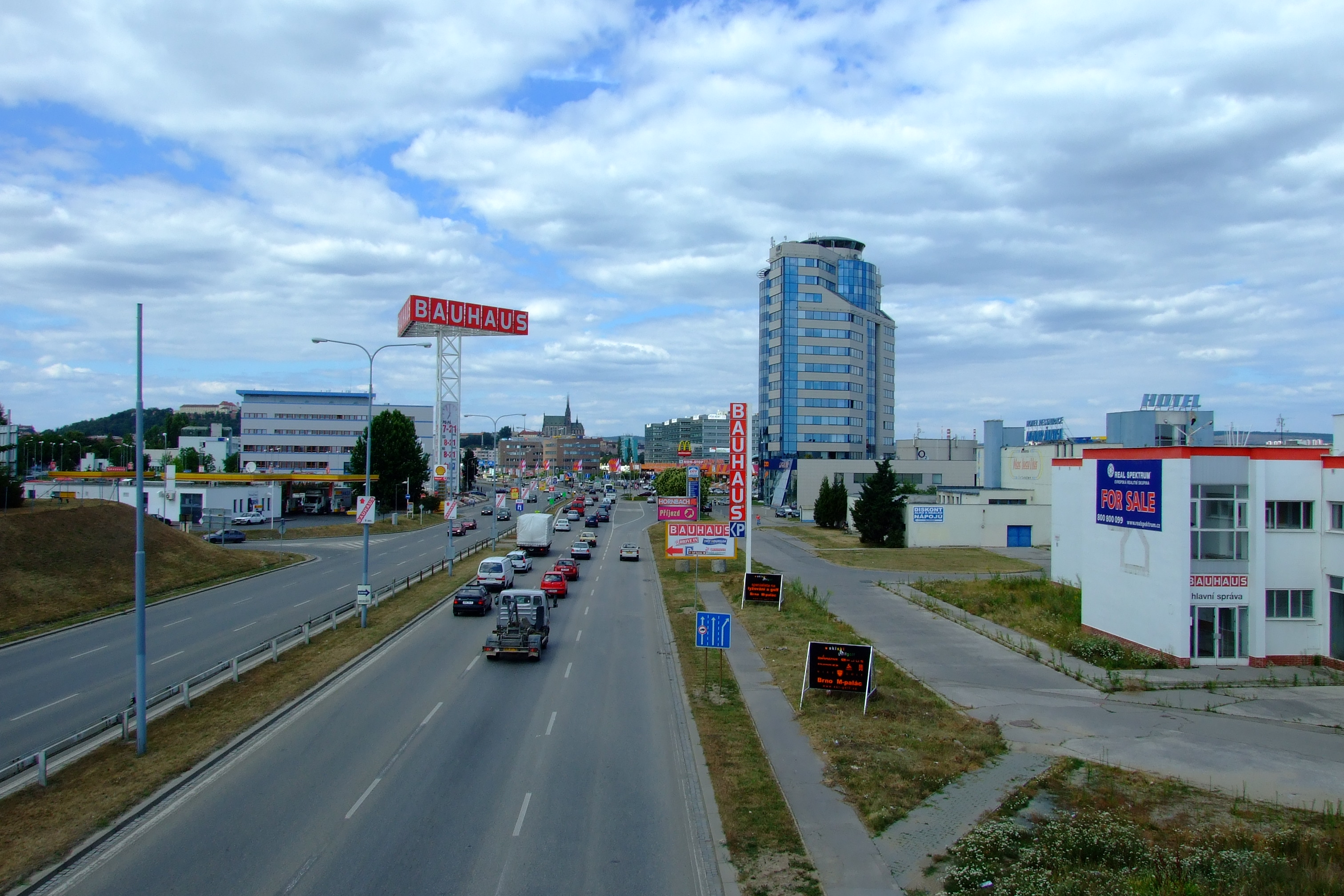
M-Palace

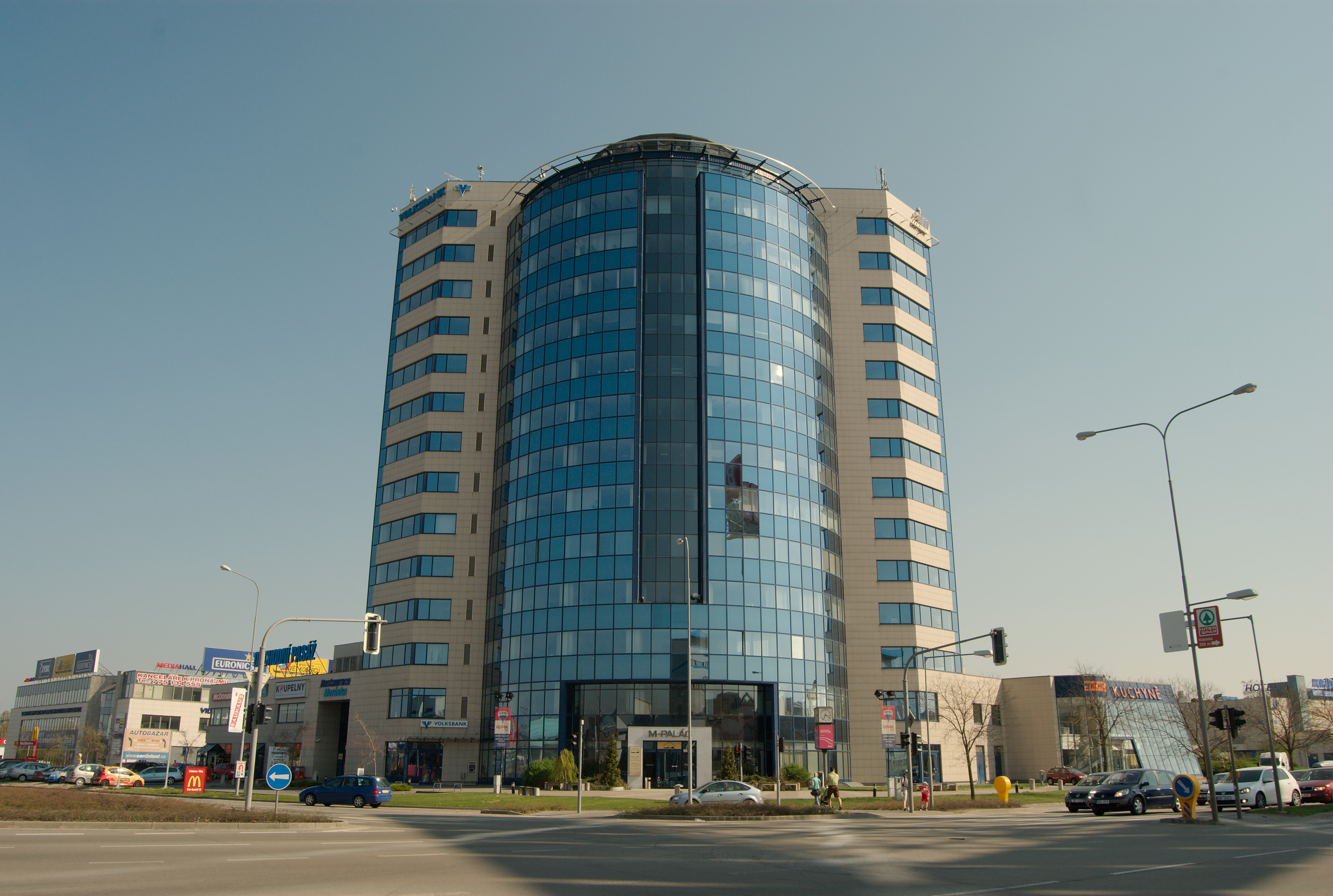
M-Palace

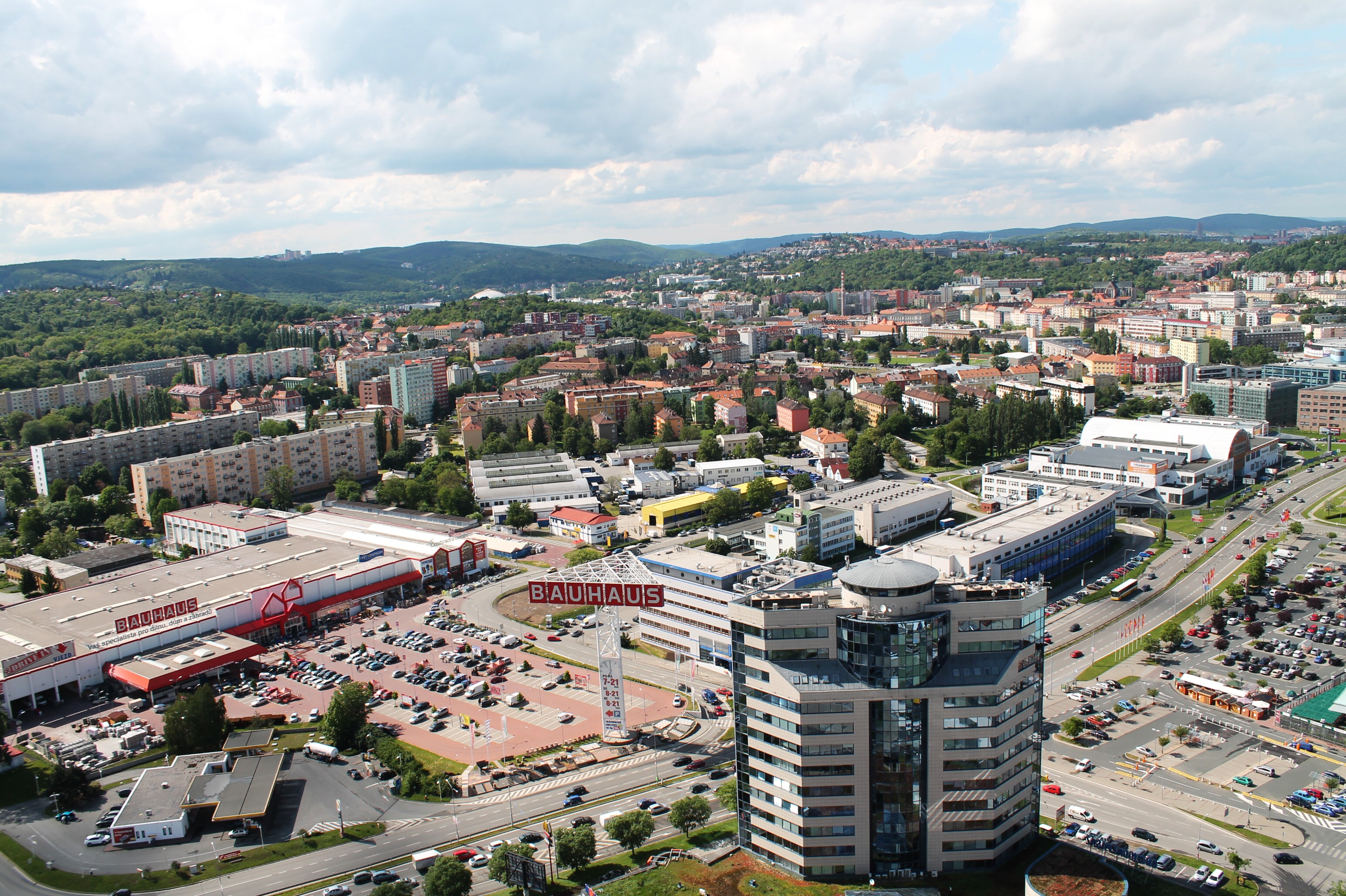
View from AZ Tower

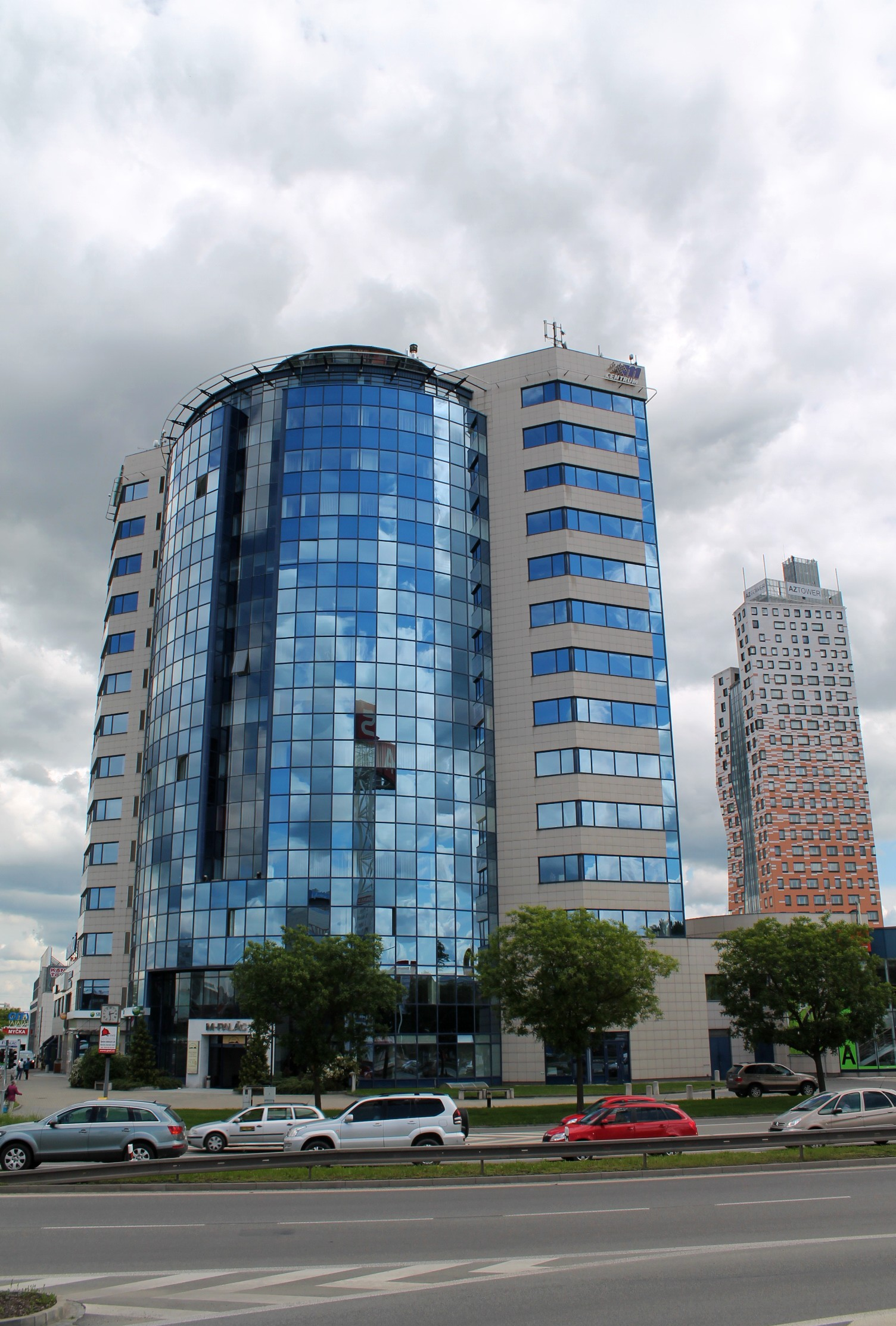
M-Palace and AZ Tower

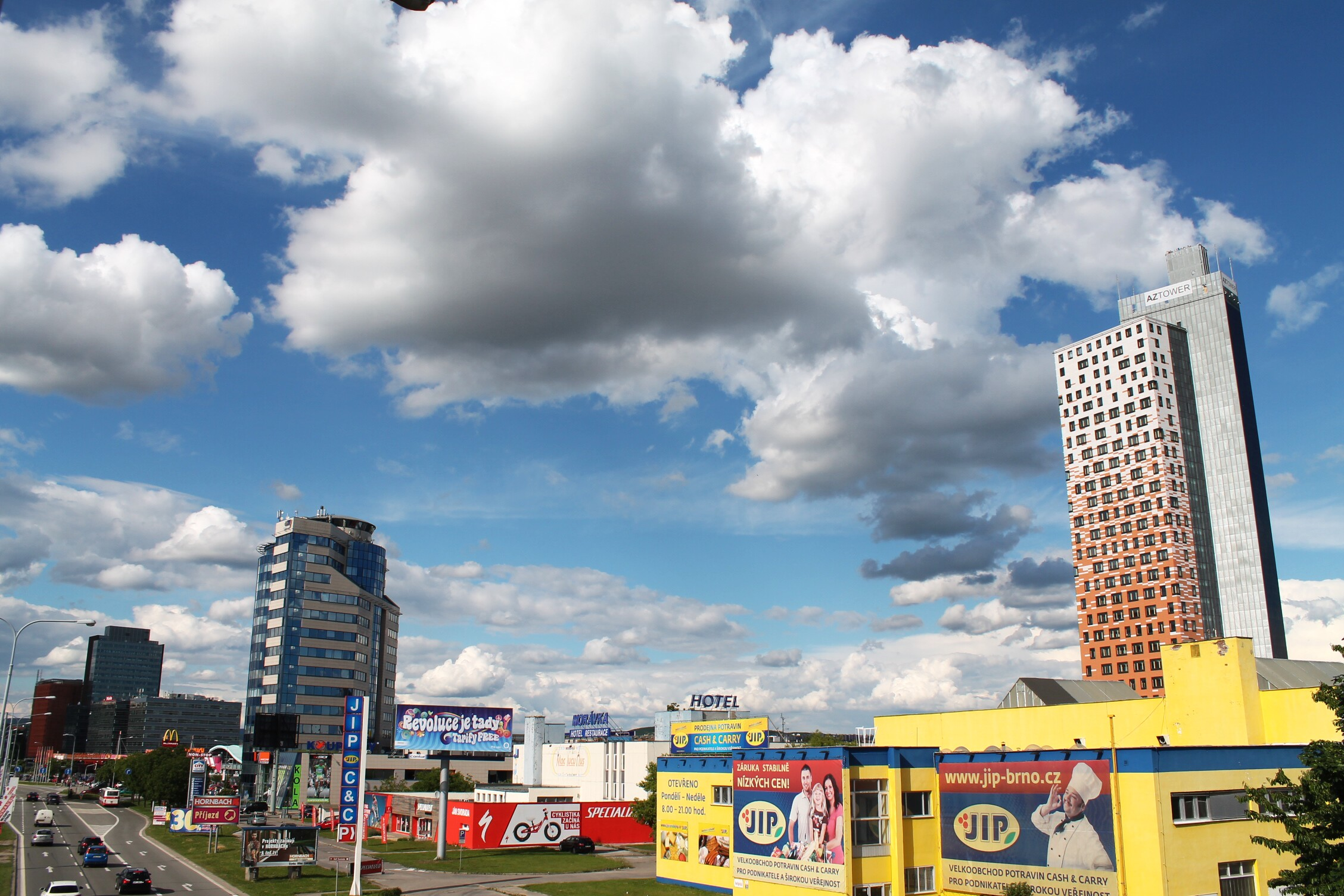
From left to right: Spielberk Towers, M-Palace and AZ Tower
