= AZ Tower =

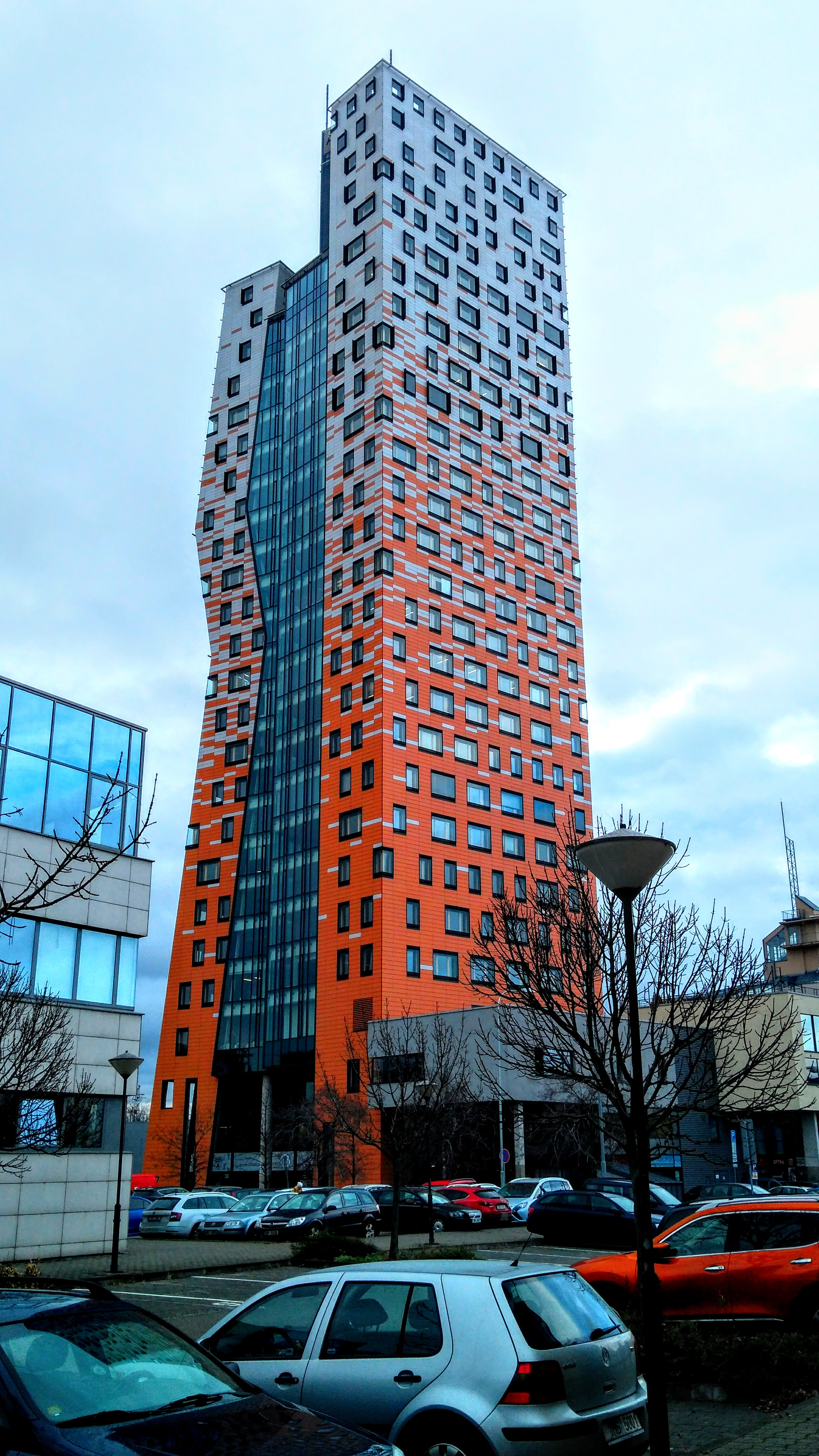
- Interactive map of the AZ Tower area

General information
- Status: Completed
- Location: Brno, Czech Republic
- Coordinates: 49°10′33″N 16°36′20″E
- Construction started: 2011
- Completed: 2013
- Cost: 800 million Czech crowns

Height
- Roof: 111 m (364 ft)

Technical details
- Floor count: 30

Design and construction
- Architect: Burian - Křivinka

Website
- www.aztower.org

The AZ Tower is a skyscraper in the city of Brno, Czech Republic. The tower is 111 m (364 ft) tall, and it has 30 floors. It is currently the tallest building in the Czech Republic. Construction of the building commenced in 2011 and completed in April 2013. The building has a floor area of over 17,000 m^{2} (180,000 ft^{2}). It is utilized for office, retail and residential purposes.

The AZ Tower is located on Pražákova street in the city district Brno-center. M-Palace and Spielberk Towers are located near the building. The Spielberk Tower B used to be the tallest building in Brno until the AZ tower was built.

== Gallery ==
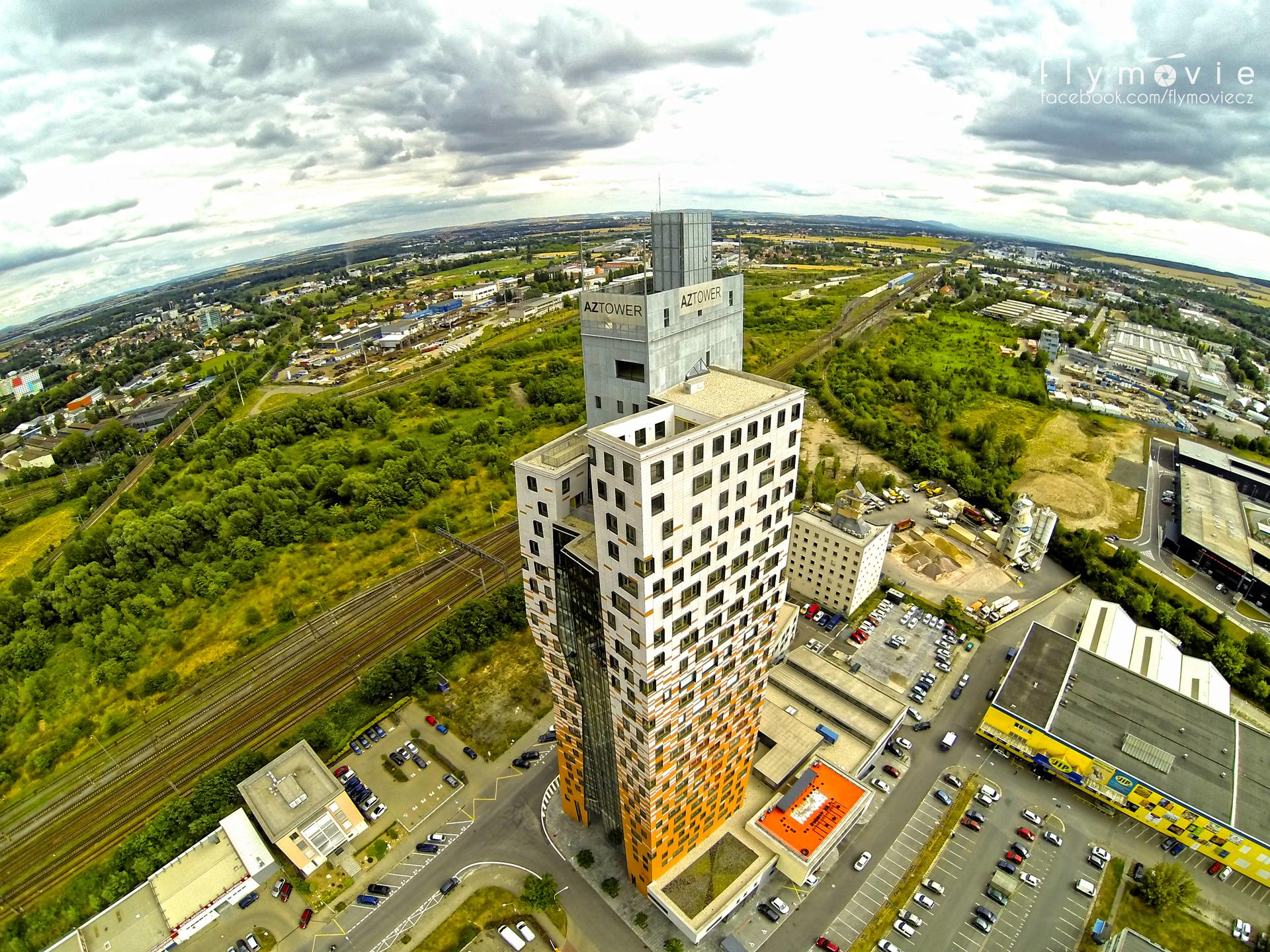
View on the AZ Tower

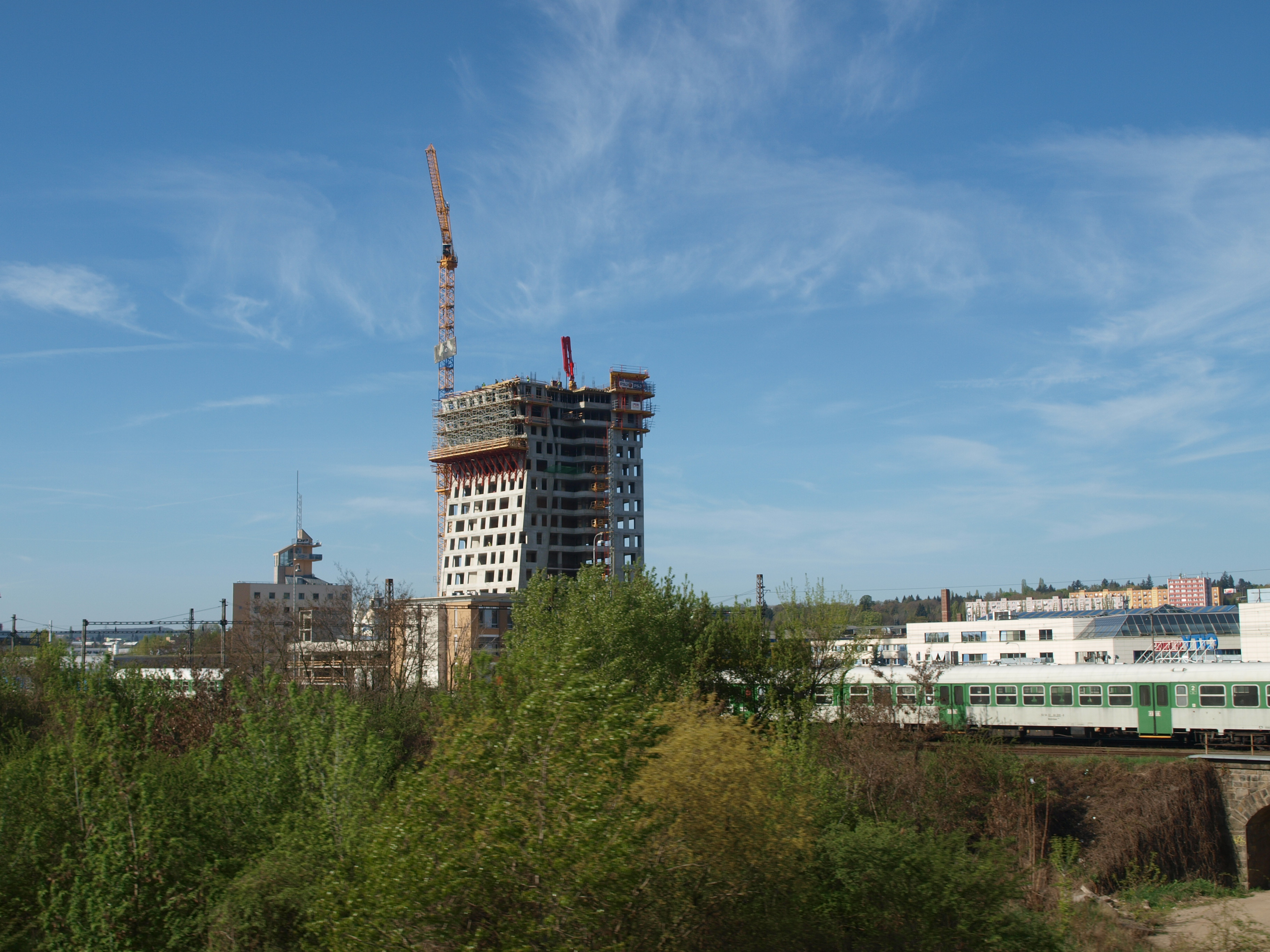
Construction of the AZ Tower

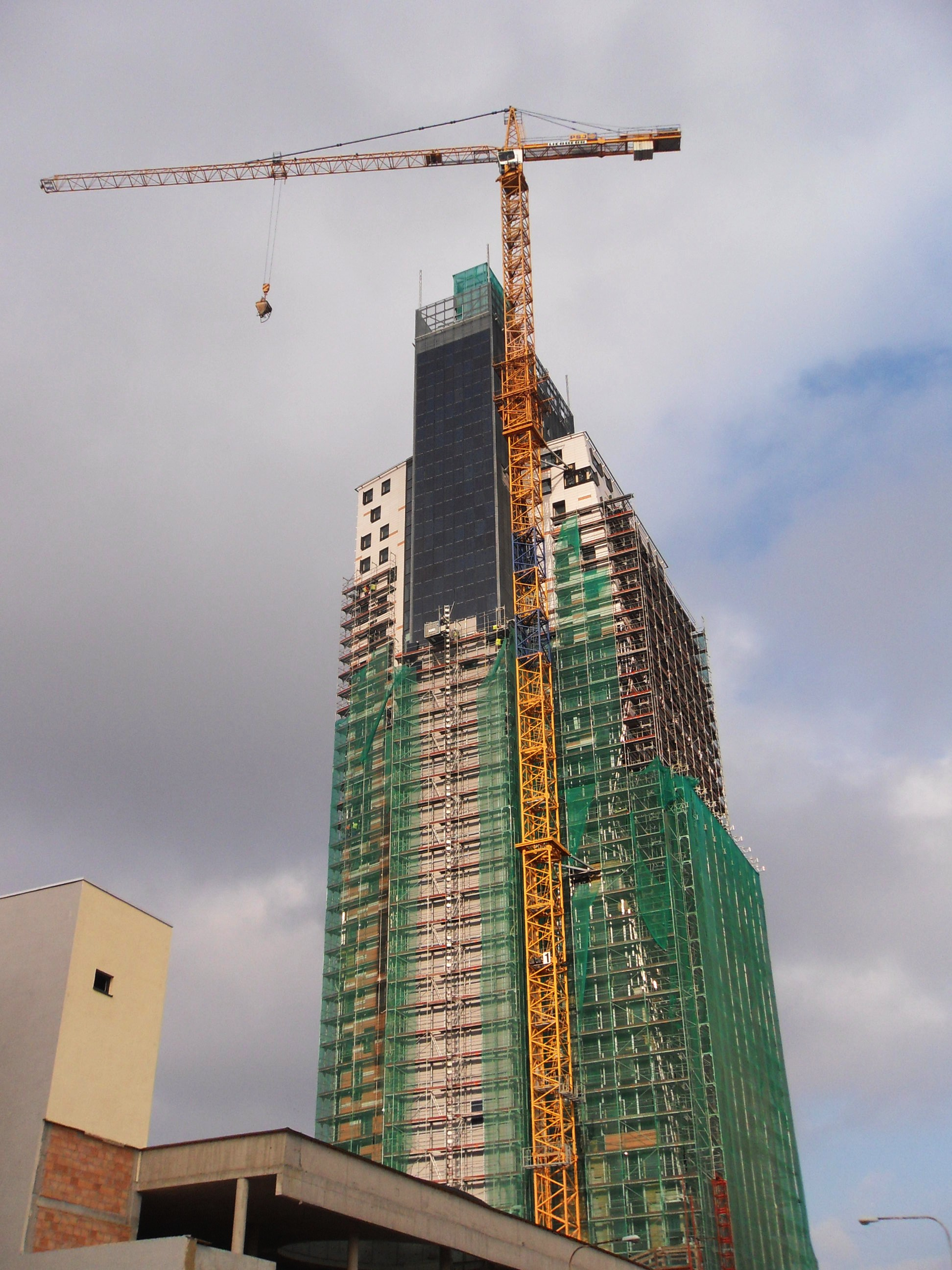
Construction of the AZ Tower

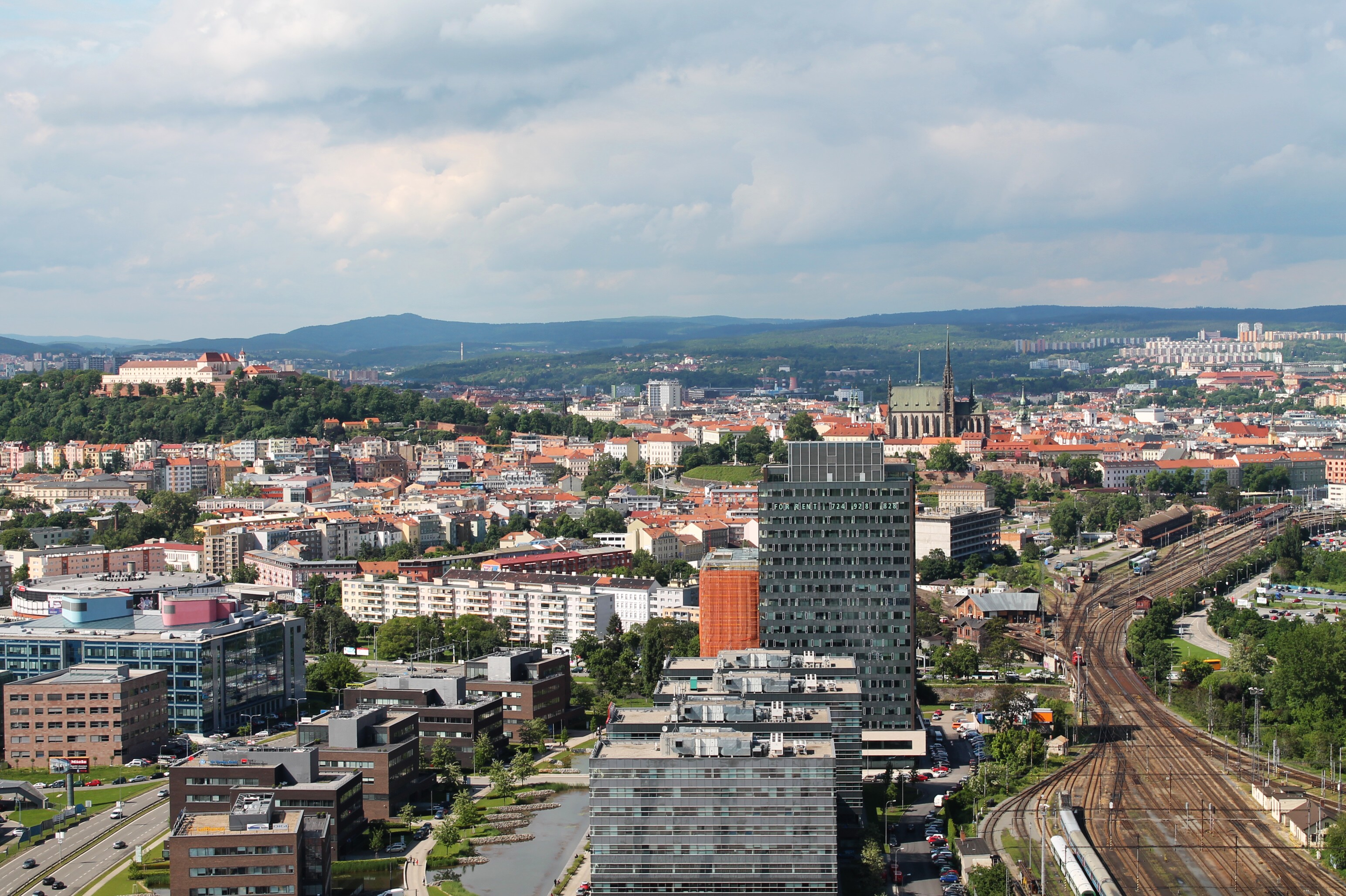
View from AZ Tower
