= Spielberk Towers =

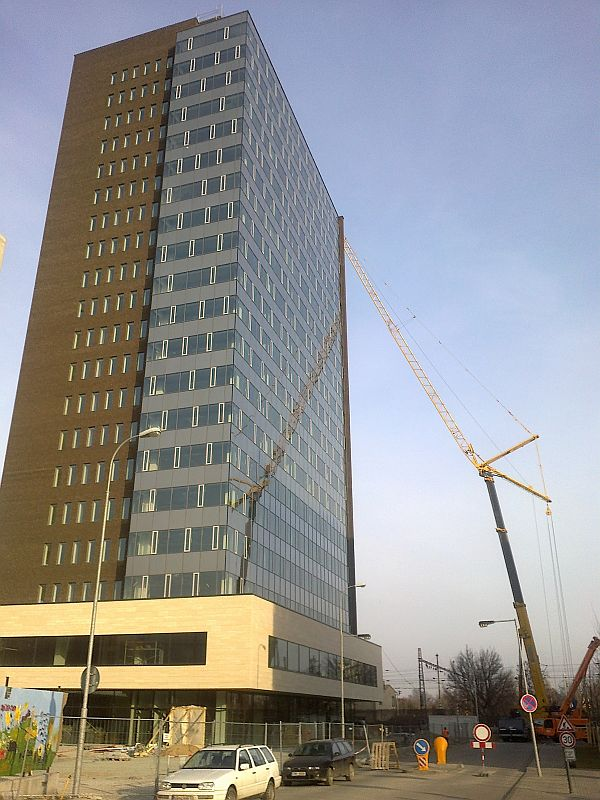
- Interactive map of the Spielberk Towers area

General information
- Status: Completed
- Location: Brno, Czech Republic
- Coordinates: 49°10′56″N 16°36′22″E
- Construction started: 2007
- Completed: 2012

Height
- Roof: Tower A 53 m (174 ft); Tower B 85 m (279 ft)

Technical details
- Floor count: Tower A 15; Tower B 21

Spielberk Towers are two high-rises in Brno, Czech Republic. The towers are part of the complex Spielberk Office Centre. The towers are named as Tower A and Tower B. The lower tower is named Tower A and the taller tower is named Tower B. The Tower A is 53 metres high and the taller Tower B is 85 metres high. The taller tower has 21 floors above ground and 3 floors below ground. The building has received a BREEAM Outstanding certificate.

The construction of the building started in 2007, but it was stopped because of the 2008 financial crisis. The construction was restored in June 2010. The Tower B was completed in 2012. The Tower A is used as a hotel. The Tower B had been the tallest building in Brno before the AZ Tower was built in 2013.

== Gallery ==
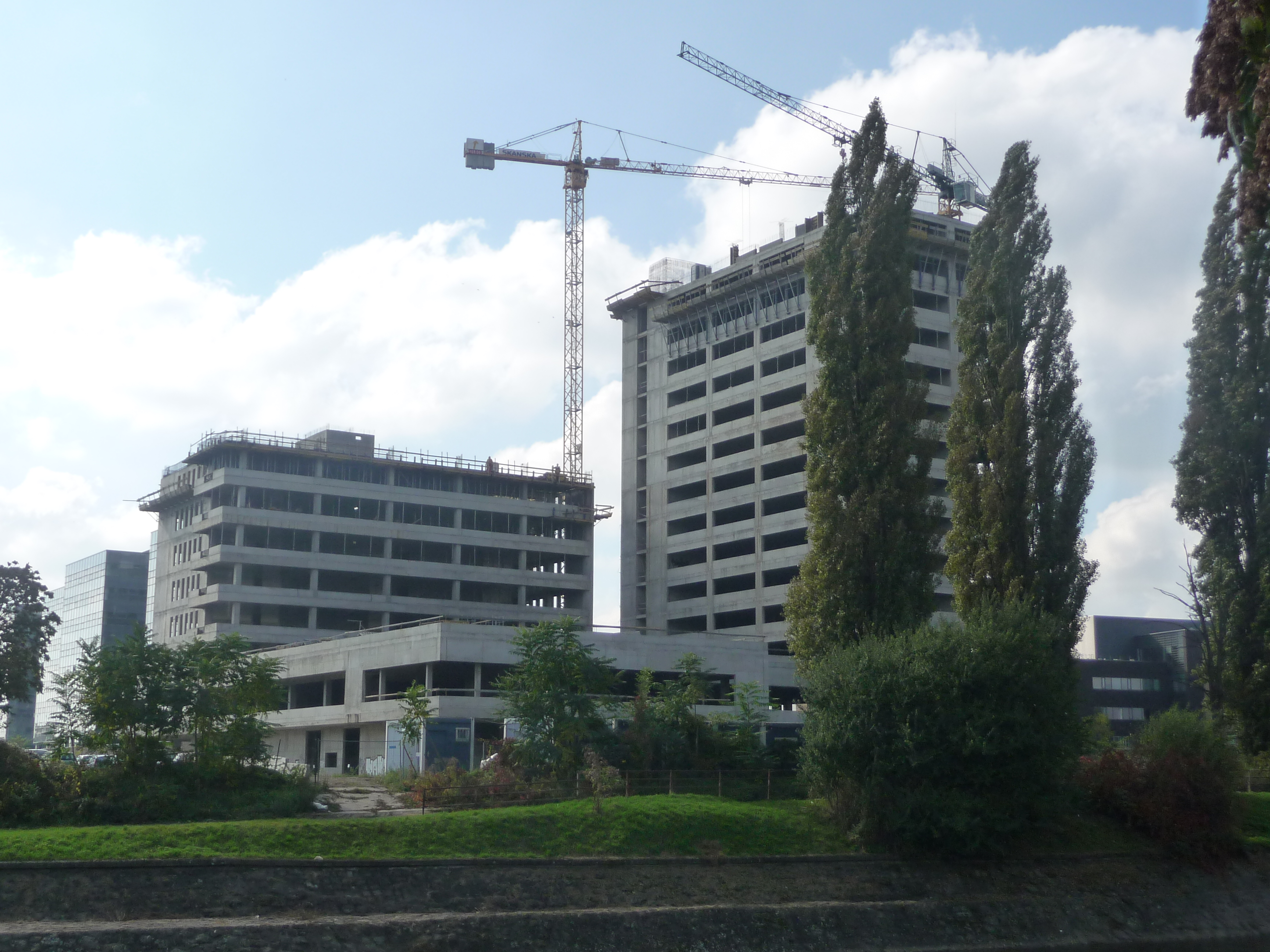
Construction of the Spielberk Towers

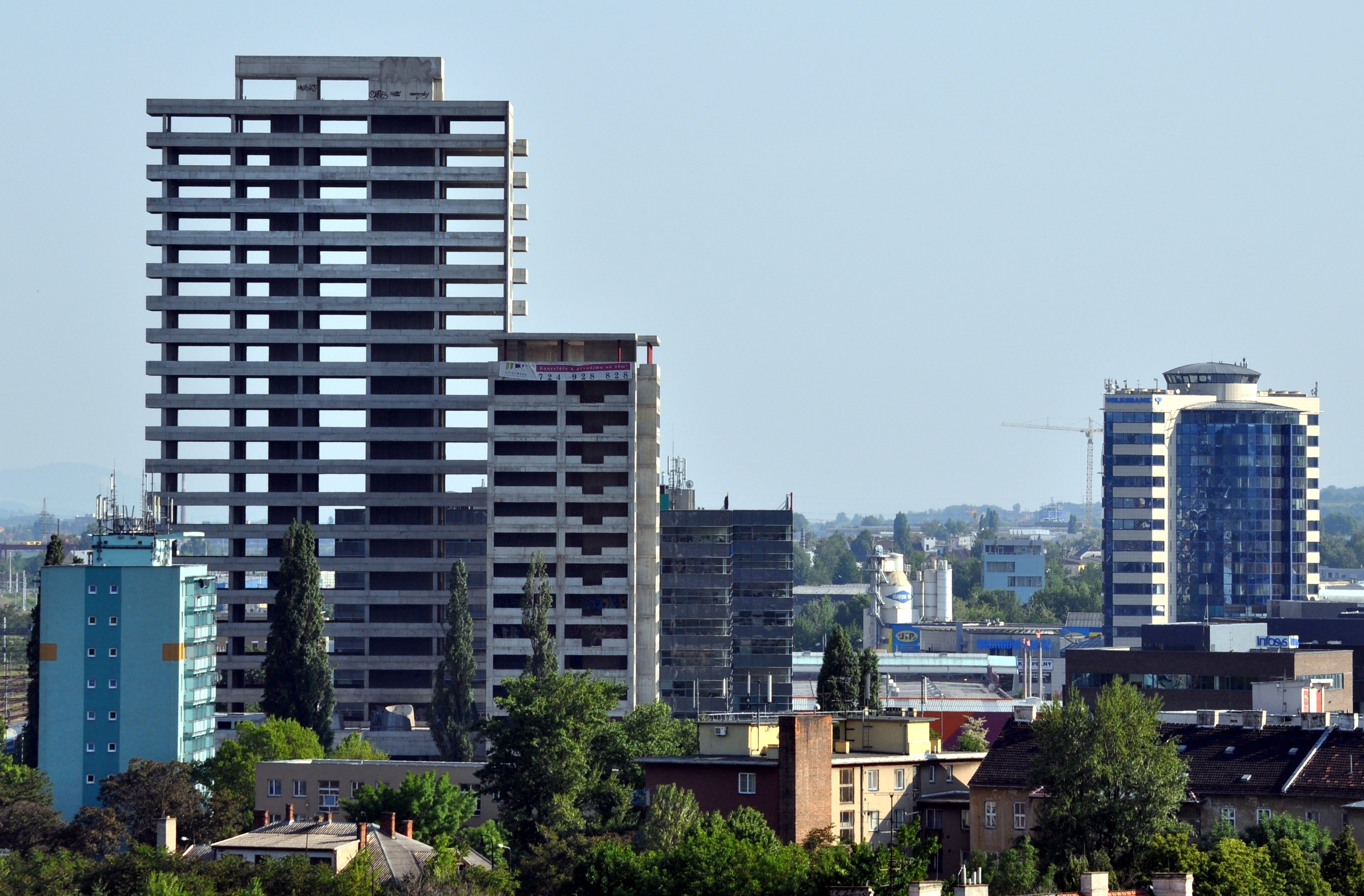
Construction of the Spielberk Towers

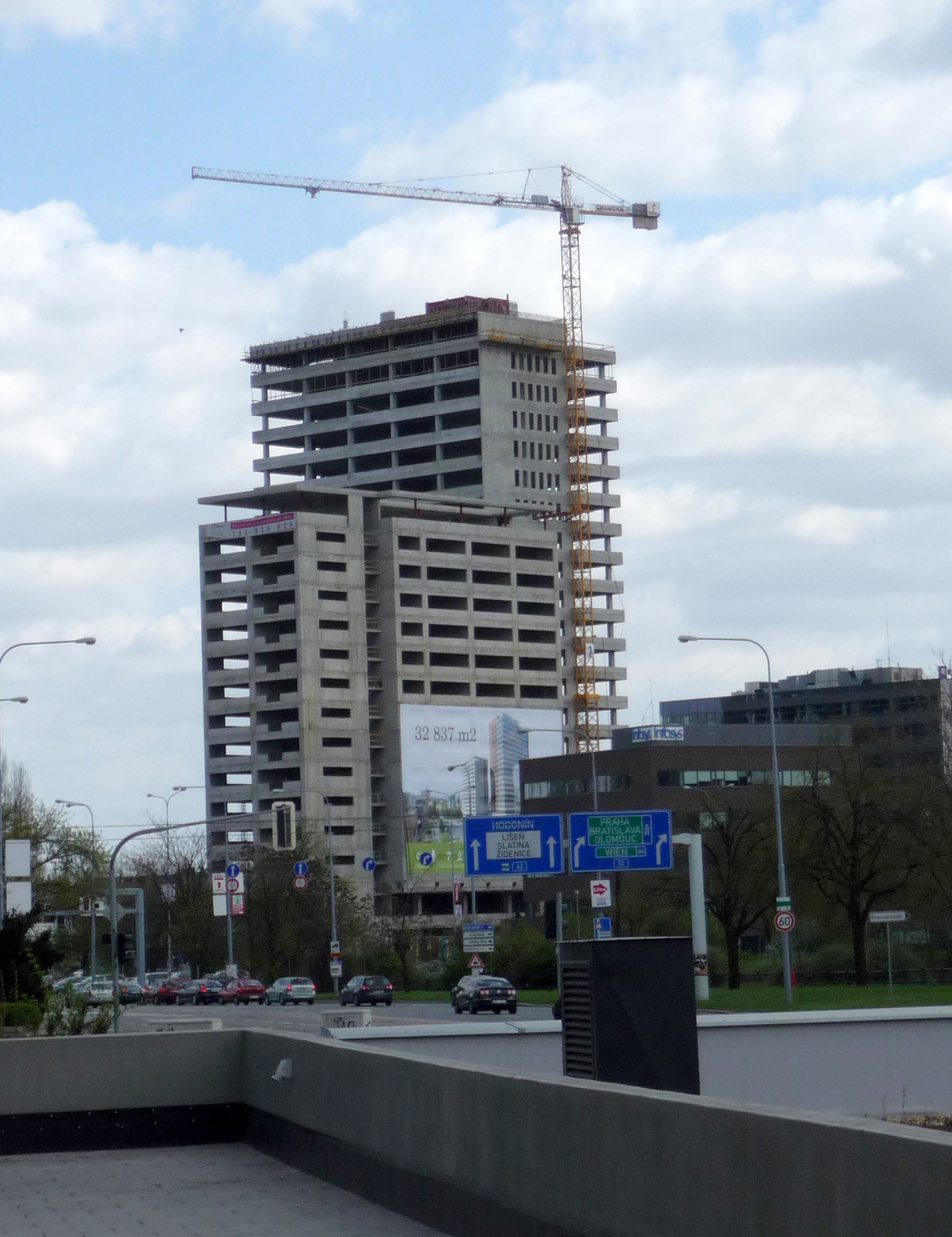
Construction of the Spielberk Towers

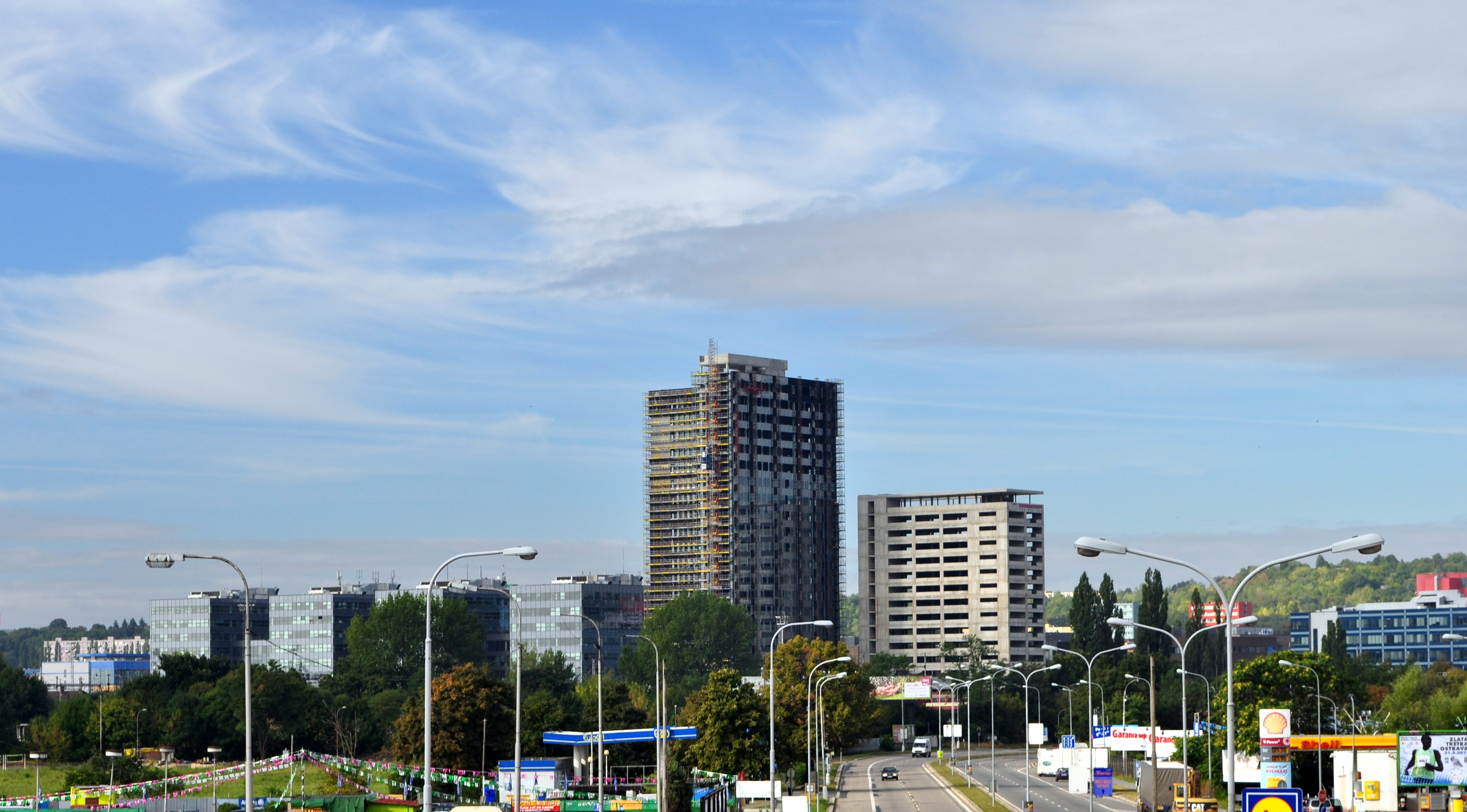
Construction of the Spielberk Towers

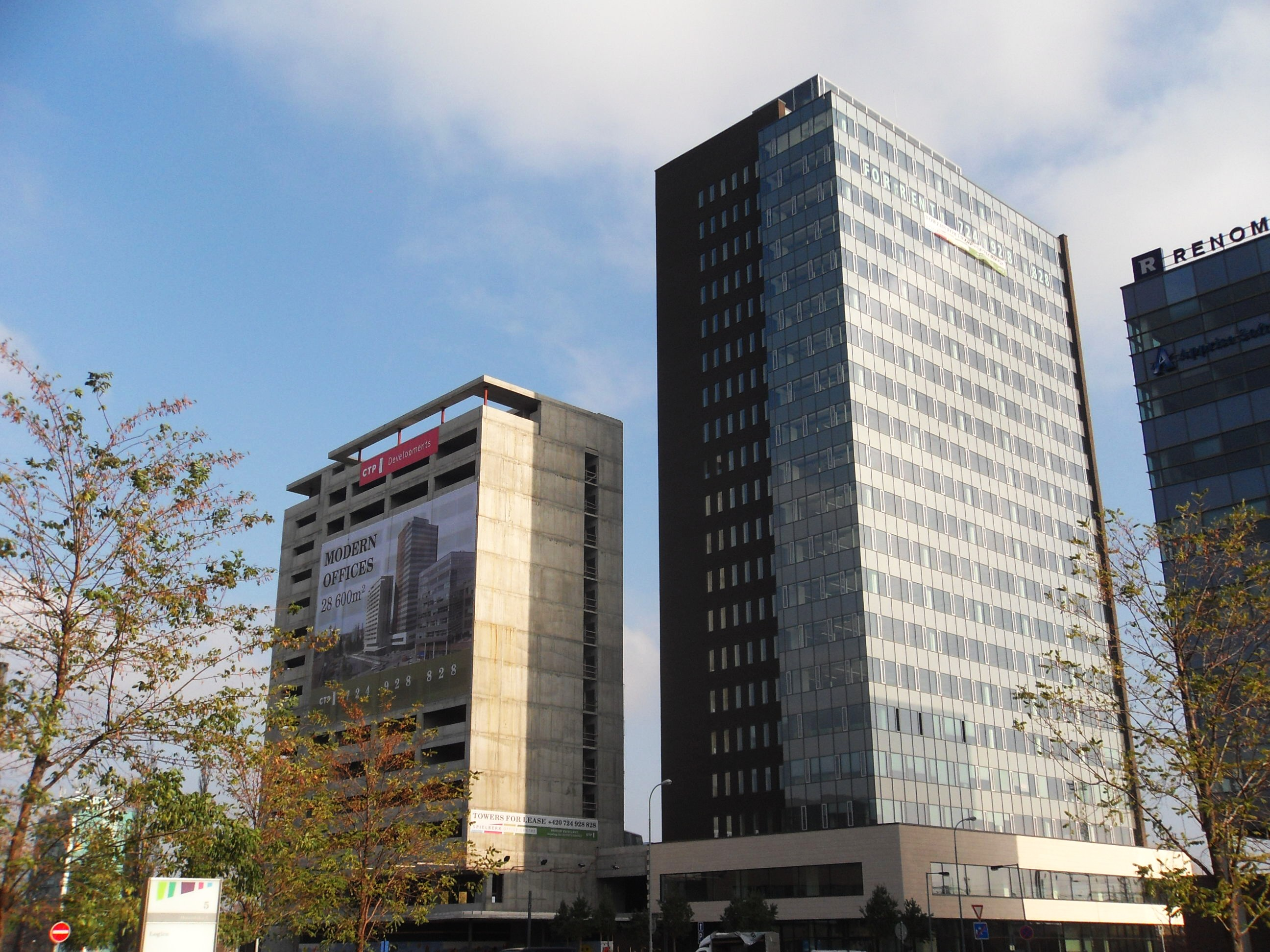
Spielberk Towers

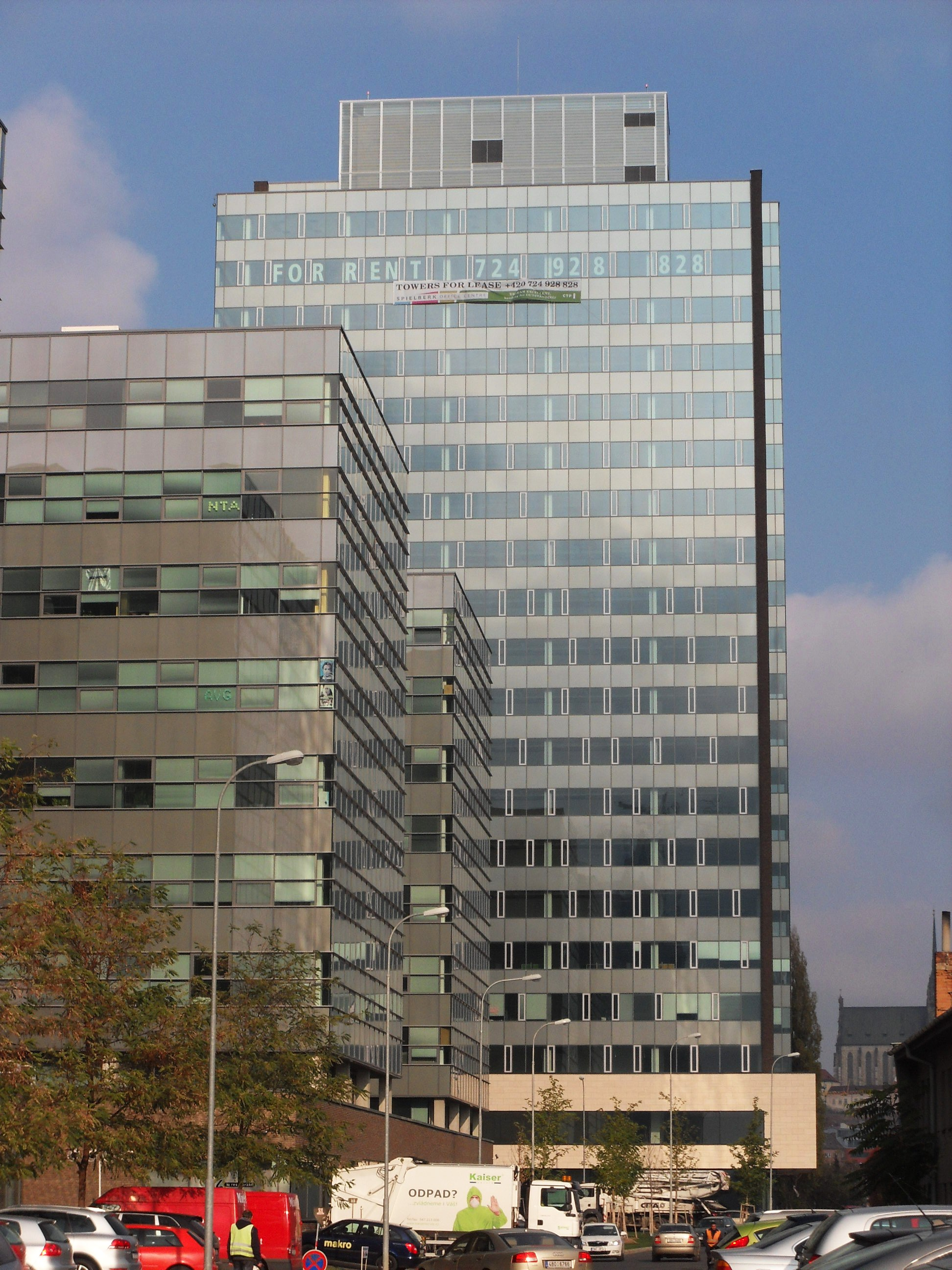
Spielberk Tower B
