= Outline of Prague =

Overview of and topical guide to Prague

Flag of Prague

Coat of arms of Prague

The following outline is provided as an overview of and topical guide to Prague:

Prague – capital and largest city in the Czech Republic. With about 1.3 million residents within an area of 496 km2 (192 sq mi), it has the status of a statutory city. Prague is classified as a "Beta+" global city according to GaWC studies, and is the fifth most visited European city after London, Paris, Istanbul and Rome.

== General reference ==
- Pronunciation: English: /prɑːɡ/; Czech: Praha [ˈpraɦa];
- Common English name(s): Prague
- Official English name(s): Prague
- Adjectival(s): Praguer
- Demonym(s): Praguer

== Geography of Prague ==
Geography of Prague

- Prague is:
  - a city
  - a statutory city
    - capital of the Czech Republic
- Population of Prague: 1,280,508
- Area of Prague: 496 km^{2} (192 sq mi)
- Atlas of Prague

Prague Praha
- Location within the Czech Republic
- Coordinates: 50°05′N 14°25′E

=== Location of Prague ===
- Prague is situated within the following regions:
  - Northern Hemisphere and Eastern Hemisphere
    - Eurasia
      - Europe (outline)
        - Central Europe
          - Czech Republic (outline)
            - Bohemia
- Time zone(s):
  - Central European Time (UTC+01)
  - In Summer (DST): Central European Summer Time (UTC+02)

=== Environment of Prague ===
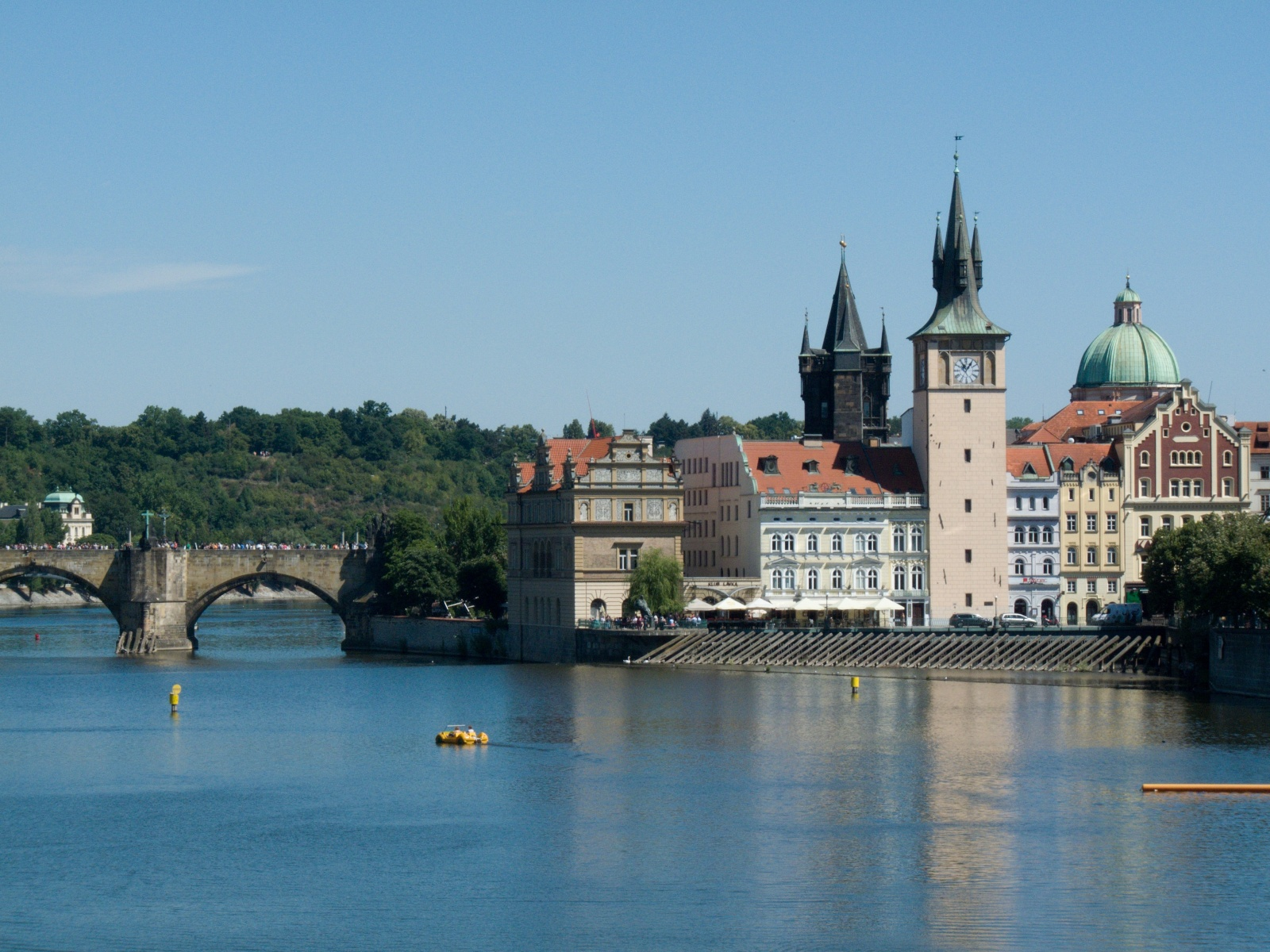
Vltava in Prague

- Climate of Prague

==== Natural geographic features of Prague ====
- Hills in Prague
  - Letná
  - Petřín
- Islands in Prague
  - Kampa Island
  - Střelecký Island
- Rivers in Prague
  - Vltava

=== Areas of Prague ===
Administrative districts of Prague

Districts of Prague

- New Town
- Old Town

=== Locations in Prague ===
- Tourist attractions in Prague
  - Museums in Prague
  - Shopping areas and markets
  - World Heritage Sites in Prague
    - Hradčany

==== Bridges in Prague ====
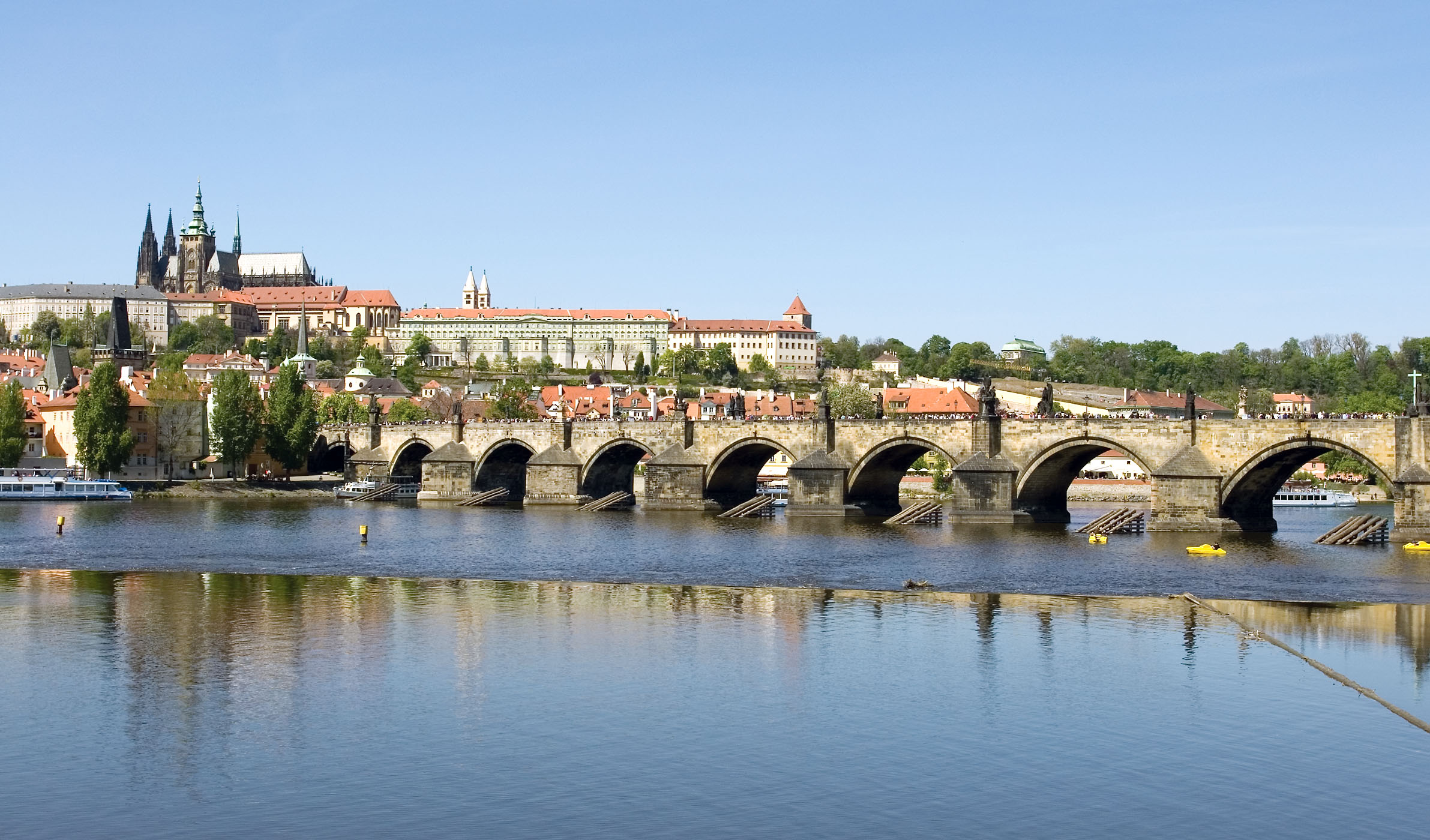
The Charles Bridge

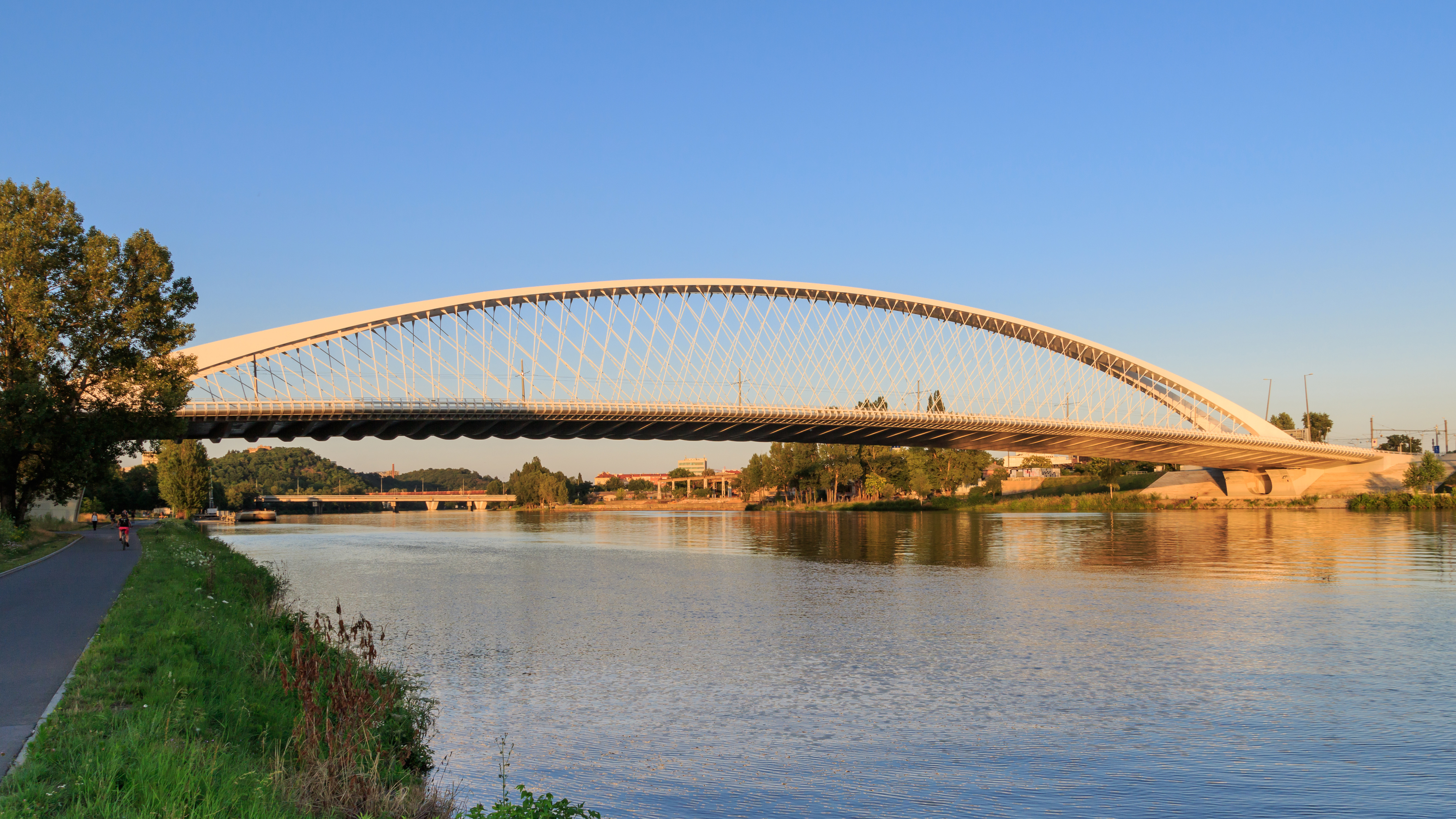
Troja Bridge

Bridges in Prague

- Charles Bridge
  - Statues on Charles Bridge
- Jirásek Bridge
- Legion Bridge
- Libeň Bridge
- Mánes Bridge
- Nusle Bridge
- Palacký Bridge
- Svatopluk Čech Bridge
- Troja Bridge
- Vyšehrad railway bridge

==== Castles in Prague ====
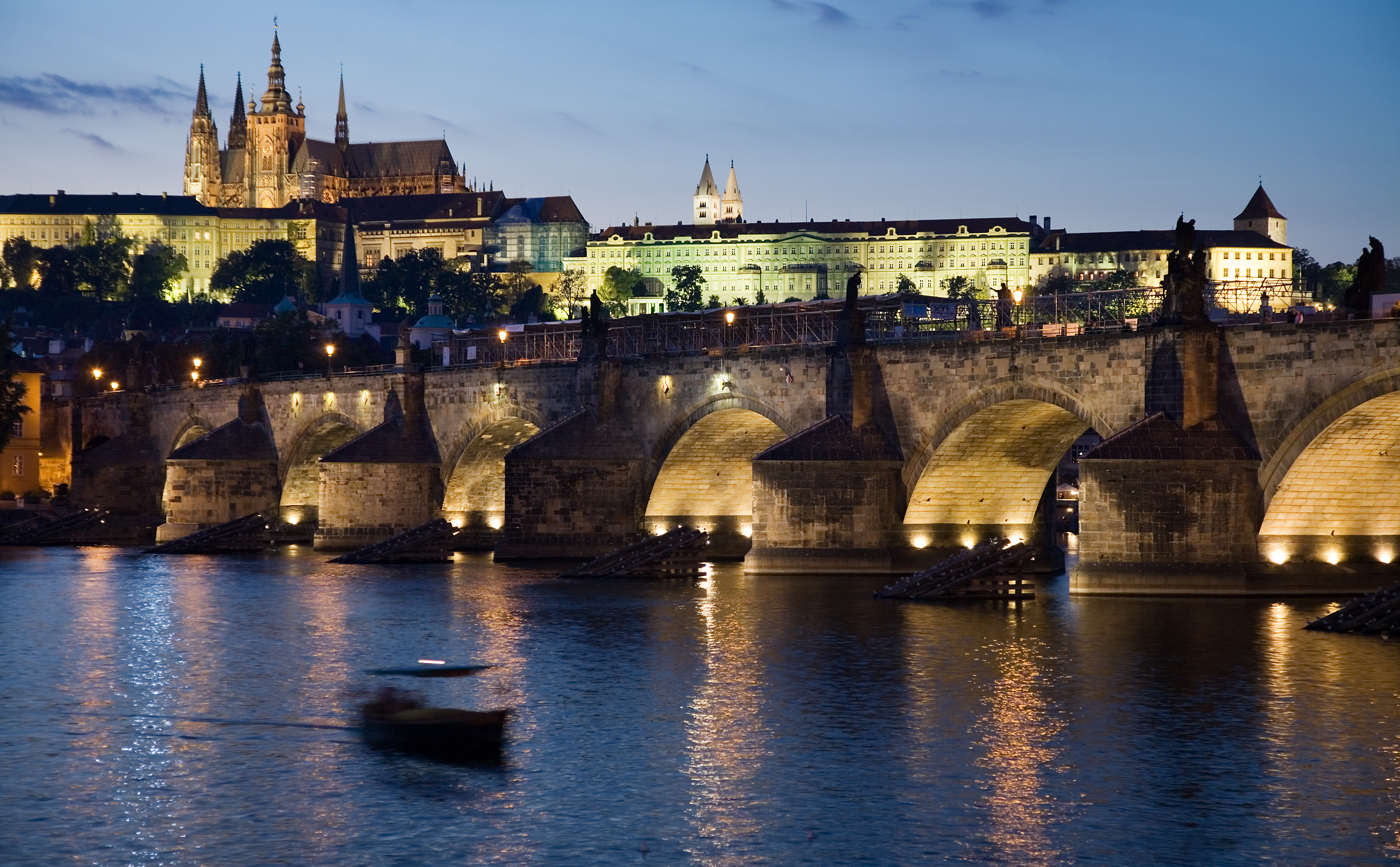
The Prague Castle during the blue hour

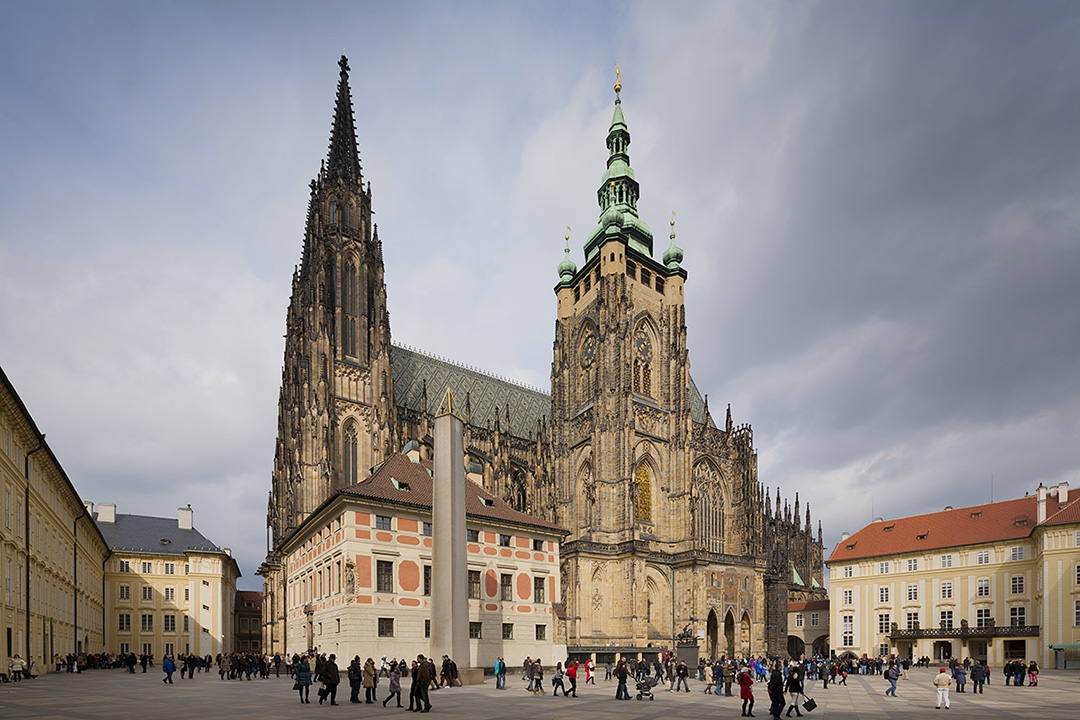
The Third courtyard of Prague Castle

Castles in Prague

- Prague Castle
  - First courtyard of Prague Castle
    - Matthias Gate
    - Wrestling Titans
  - Second courtyard of Prague Castle
    - Kohl's Fountain
  - Third courtyard of Prague Castle
    - Obelisk
  - Fourth courtyard of Prague Castle
  - Golden Lane
  - Royal Garden of Prague Castle
  - Spanish Hall
  - Vladislav Hall

==== City gates and walls of Prague ====
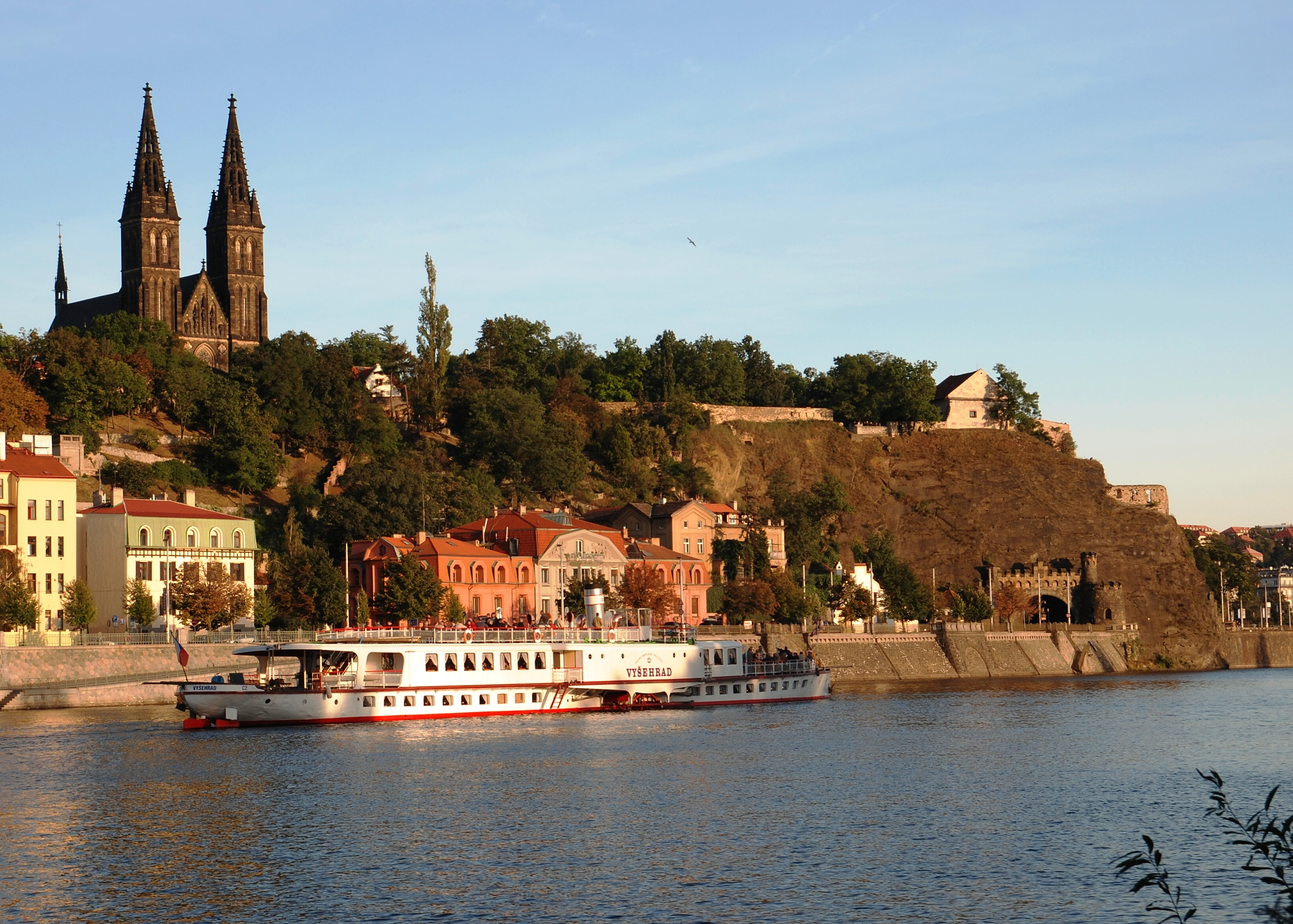
Vyšehrad, a fortified residence built on a hill over the Vltava River

- Hunger Wall
- Lennon Wall
- Písek Gate
- Powder Tower

==== Cultural and exhibition centres in Prague ====
- Prague Congress Centre

==== Forts of Prague ====
- Vyšehrad

==== Fountains in Prague ====
- Kohl's Fountain
- Kranner's Fountain
- Wimmer's Fountain

==== Monuments and memorials in Prague ====
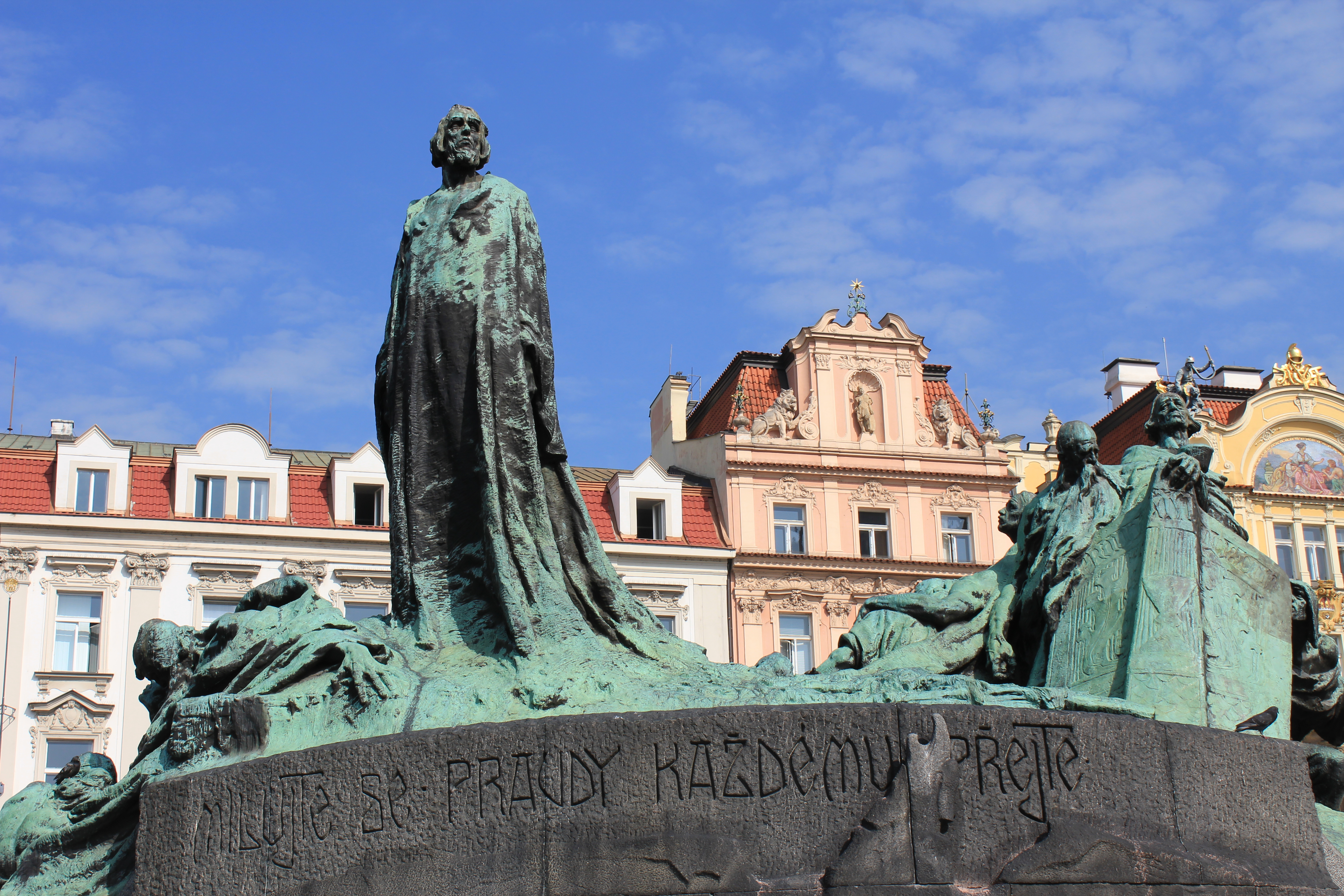
Jan Hus Memorial, which commemorates the 500th anniversary of Jan Hus' martyrdom

- František Palacký Monument
- Jan Hus Memorial
- Memorial of the Second Resistance Movement
- Memorial to the Victims of Communism
- Monument to Soviet Tank Crews
- National Monument in Vitkov
- Statue of Bedřich Smetana
- Statue of John of Nepomuk
- Statue of Tomáš Garrigue Masaryk
- Statue of Saint George
- Vítězslav Hálek Memorial
- Winged Lion Memorial

==== Museums and art galleries in Prague ====
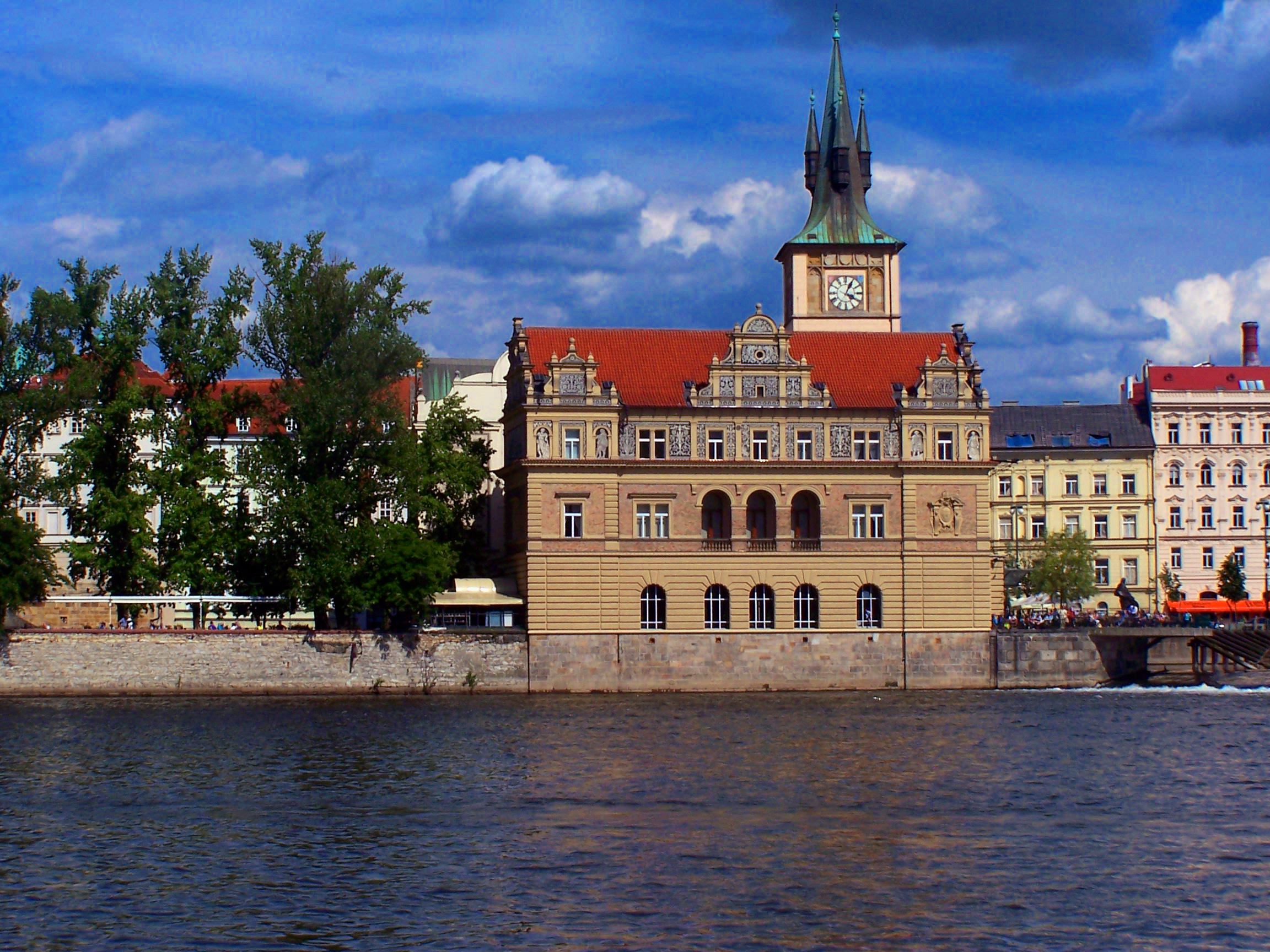
Bedřich Smetana Museum

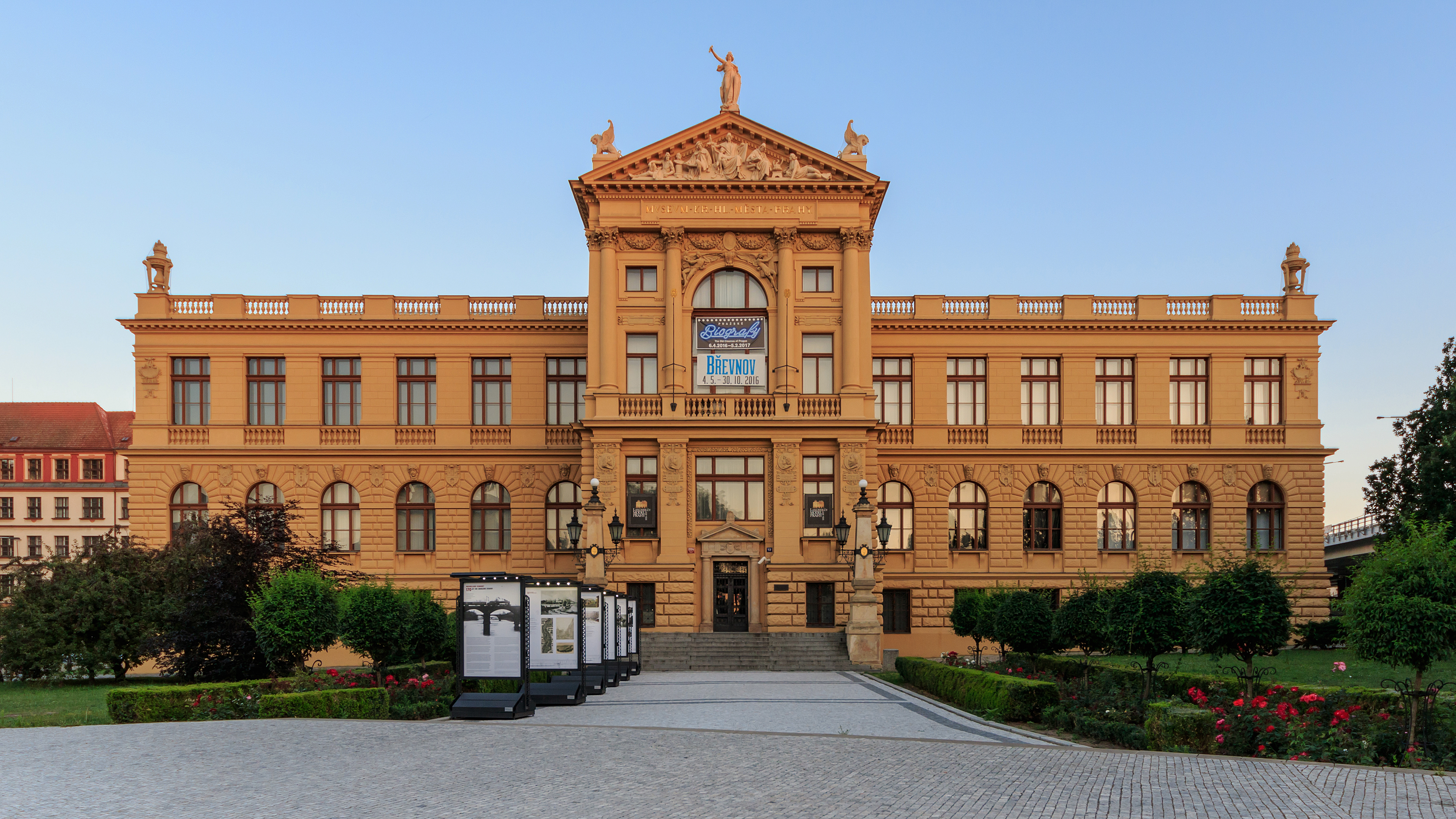
The City of Prague Museum

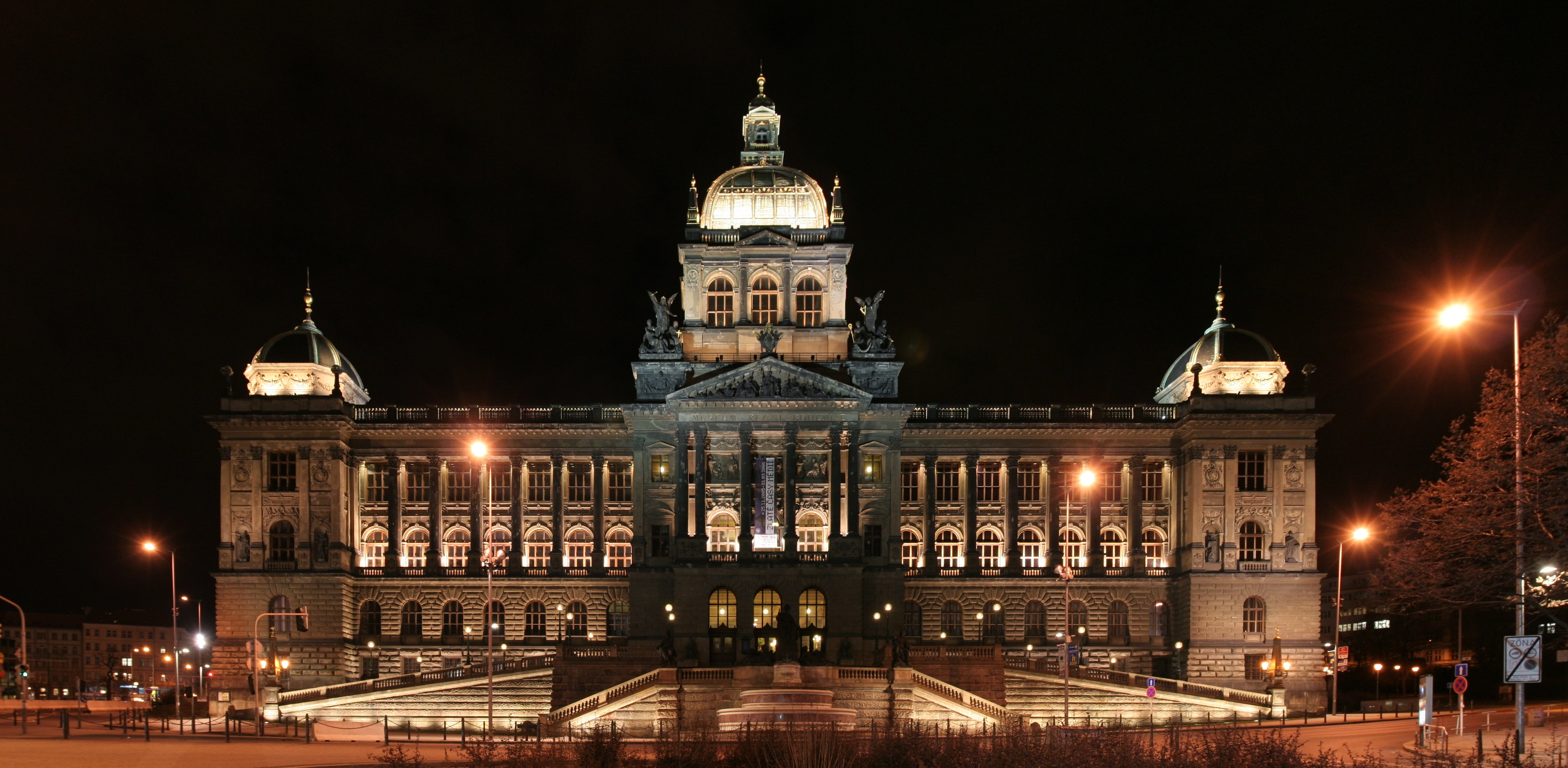
The National Museum

Museums in Prague

- Antonín Dvořák Museum
- Bedřich Smetana Museum
- City of Prague Museum
  - Langweil's Model of Prague
- Czech Police Museum
- Franz Kafka Museum
- Galerie Cesty ke světlu
- Josef Sudek Gallery
- Kepler Museum
- Museum Kampa
- Museum of Communism
- Museum of Decorative Arts in Prague
  - Galerie Rudolfinum
- Náprstek Museum
- National Gallery in Prague
- National Museum
  - Lapidarium
- National Technical Museum
- Prague Aviation Museum
- Galerie Rudolfinum
- The Václav Špála Gallery

==== Palaces and villas in Prague ====
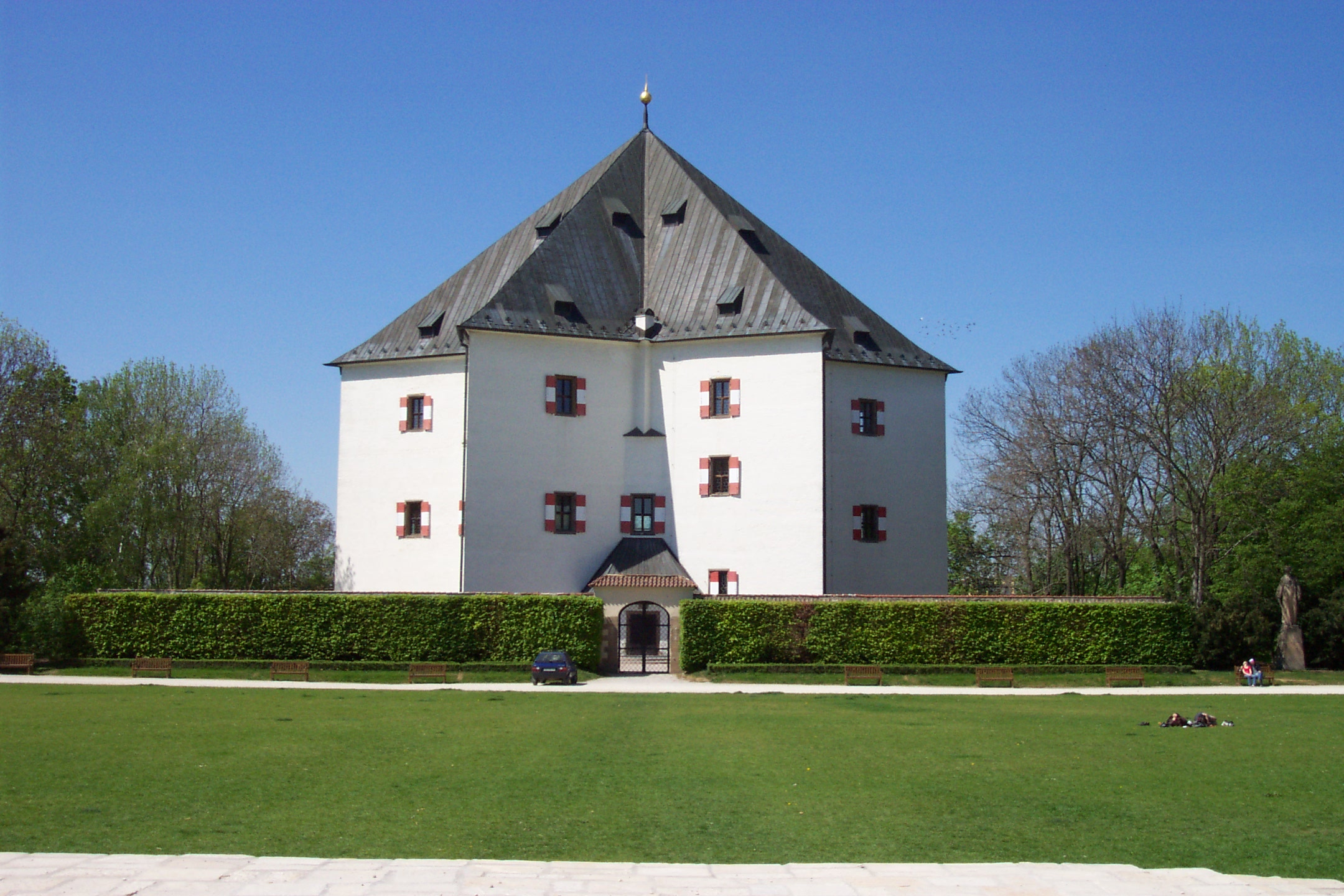
Letohrádek Hvězda

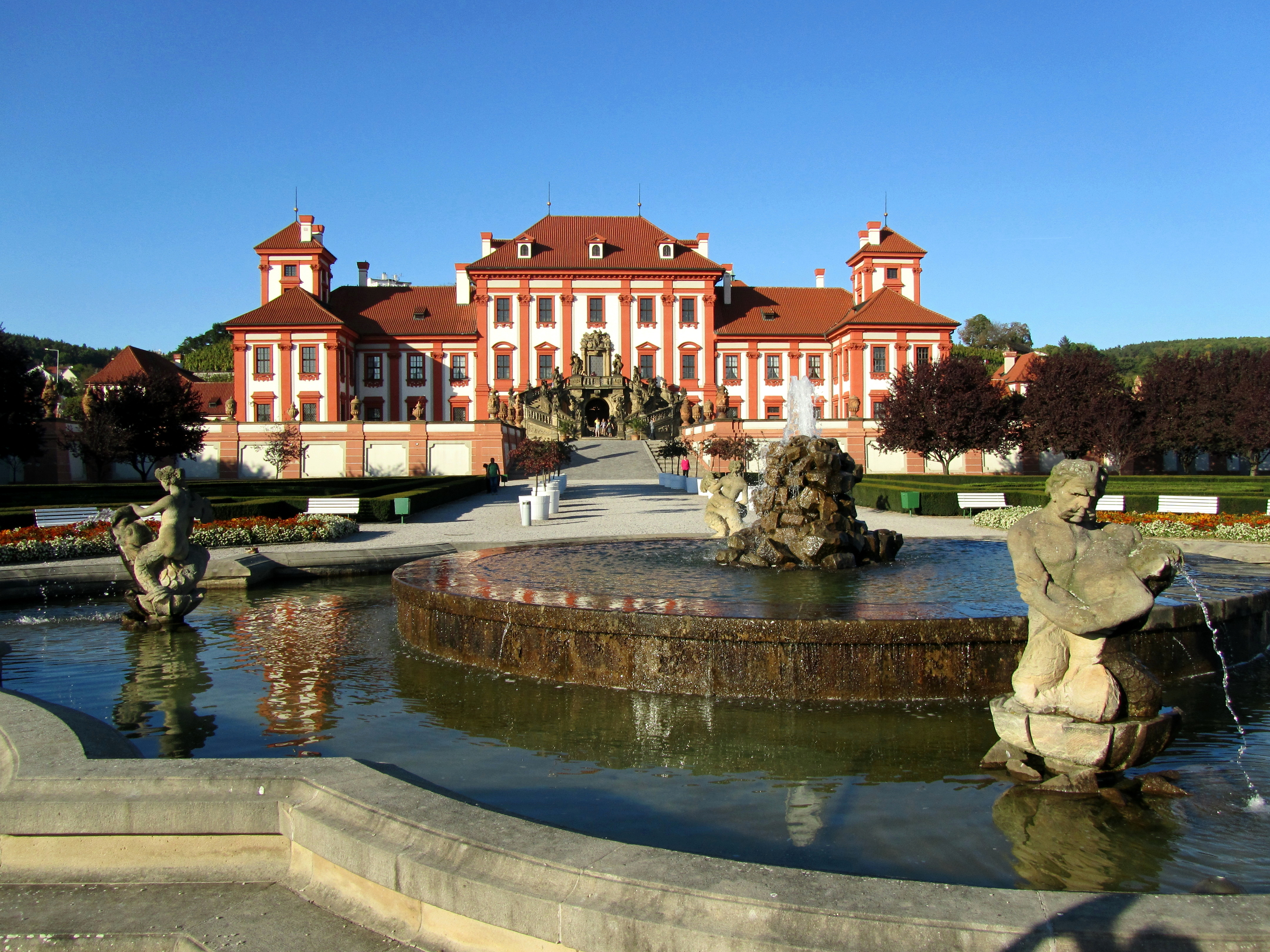
Troja Palace

- Bertramka
- Clam-Gallas Palace
- Czernin Palace
- Dolní Počernice
- Kinský Palace
- Kolowrat Palace
- Letohrádek Hvězda
- Liechtenstein Palace (Kampa Island)
- Liechtenstein Palace (Malostranské náměstí)
- Lobkowicz Palace
- Morzin Palace
- Old Royal Palace
- Schebek Palace
- Schönborn Palace
- Troja Palace
- Villa Müller
- Wallenstein Palace
- Žofín Palace

==== Parks and gardens in Prague ====
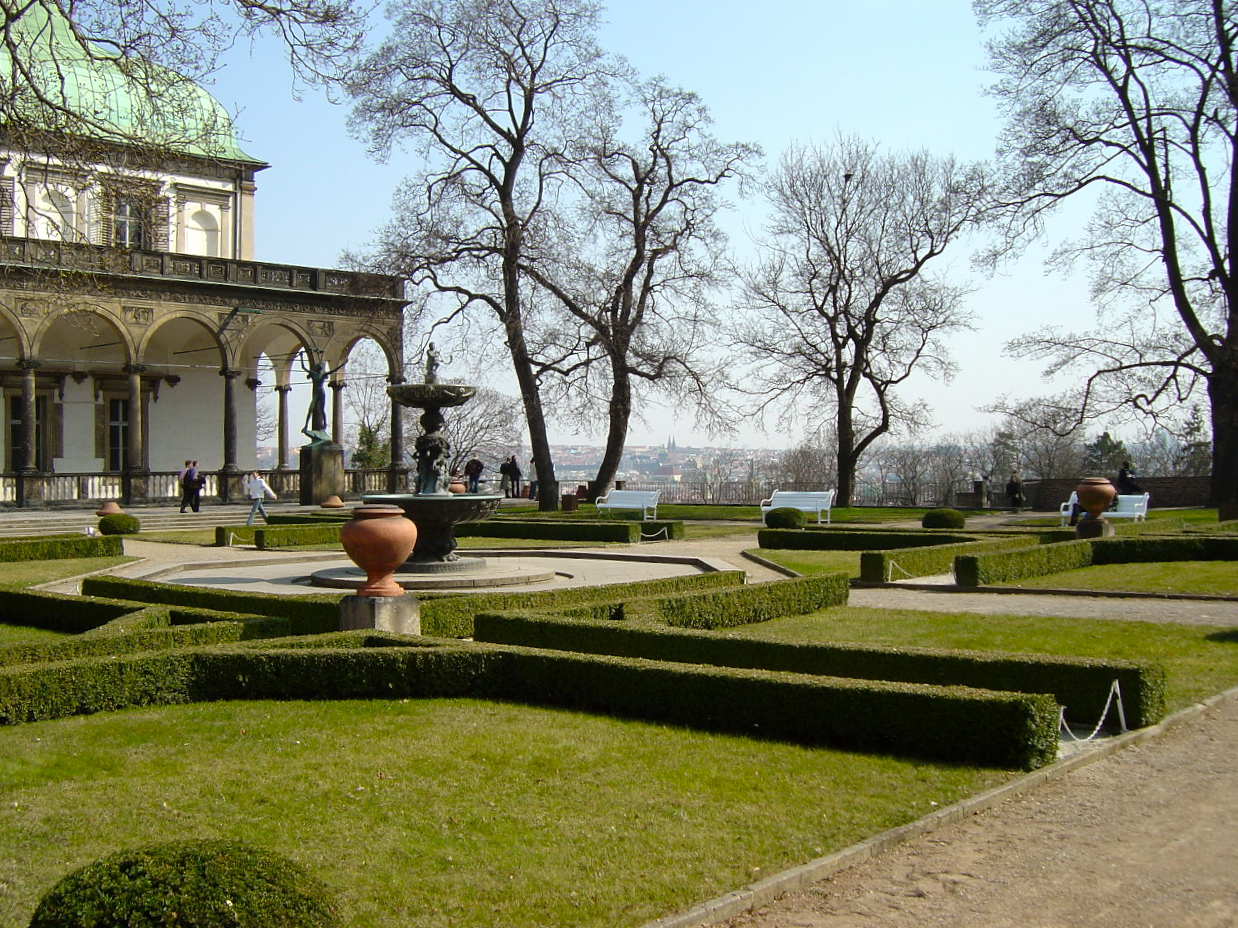
The Royal Garden of Prague Castle

- Aquapalace Prague
- Kampa Park
- Letná Park
  - Prague Metronome
- Obora Hvězda
- Park of National Awakening
- Parukářka Park
- Seminary Garden
- Stromovka

==== Public squares in Prague ====
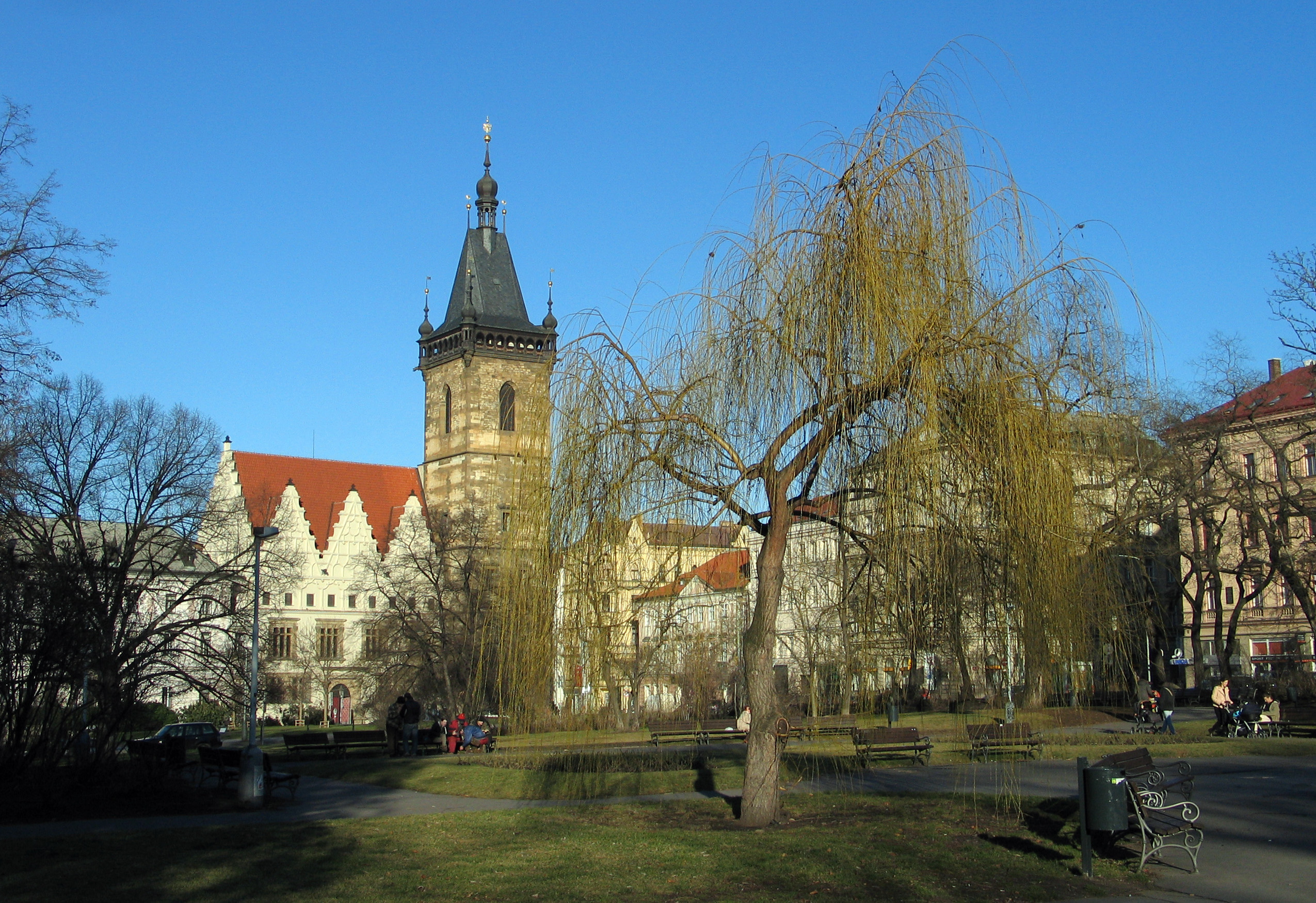
The Charles Square

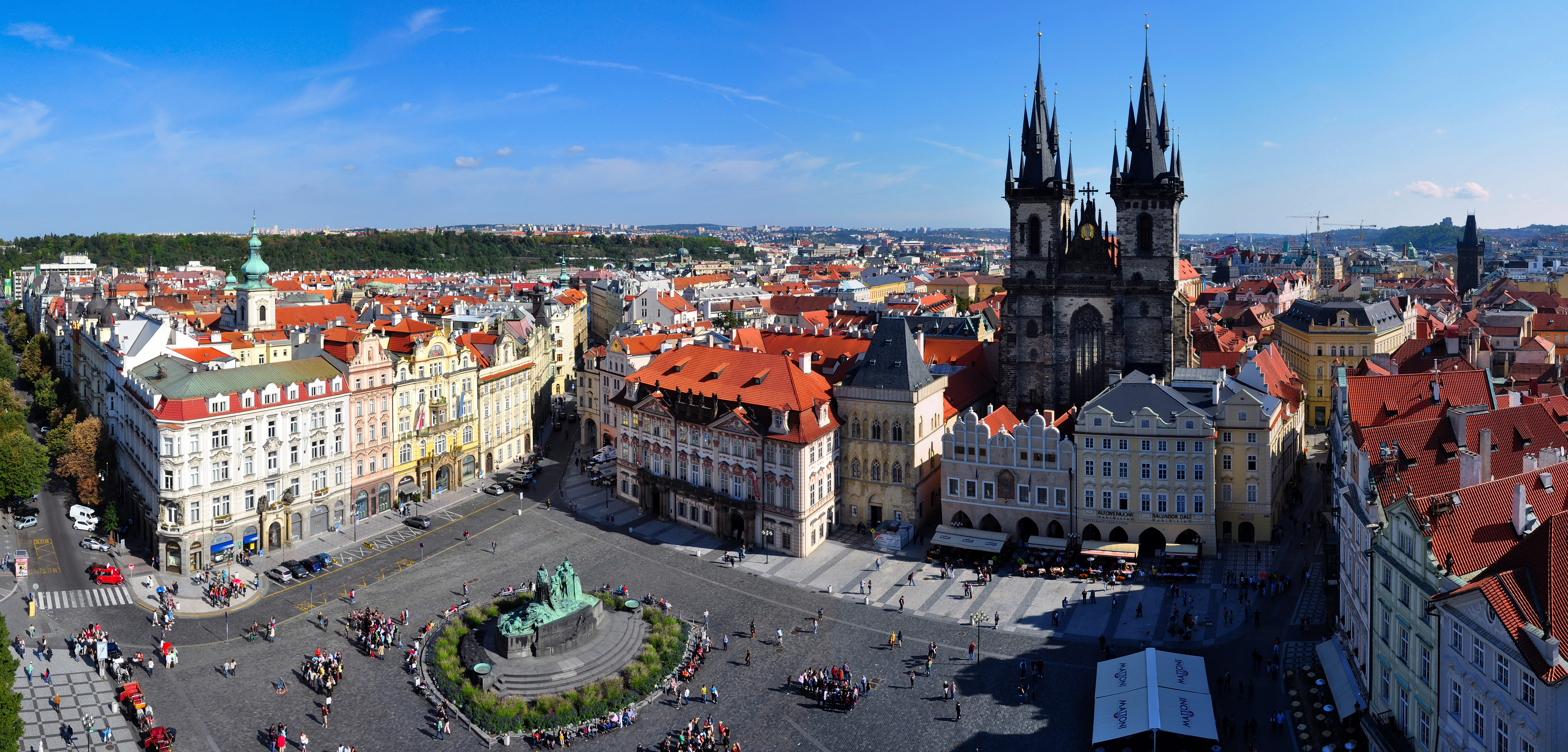
Old Town Square

Public squares in Prague

- Charles Square
- Hradčany Square
- Jan Palach Square
- Malé náměstí
- Malostranské náměstí
- Náměstí Republiky
- Old Town Square
- St. George's Square
- Wenceslas Square

==== Religious buildings in Prague ====
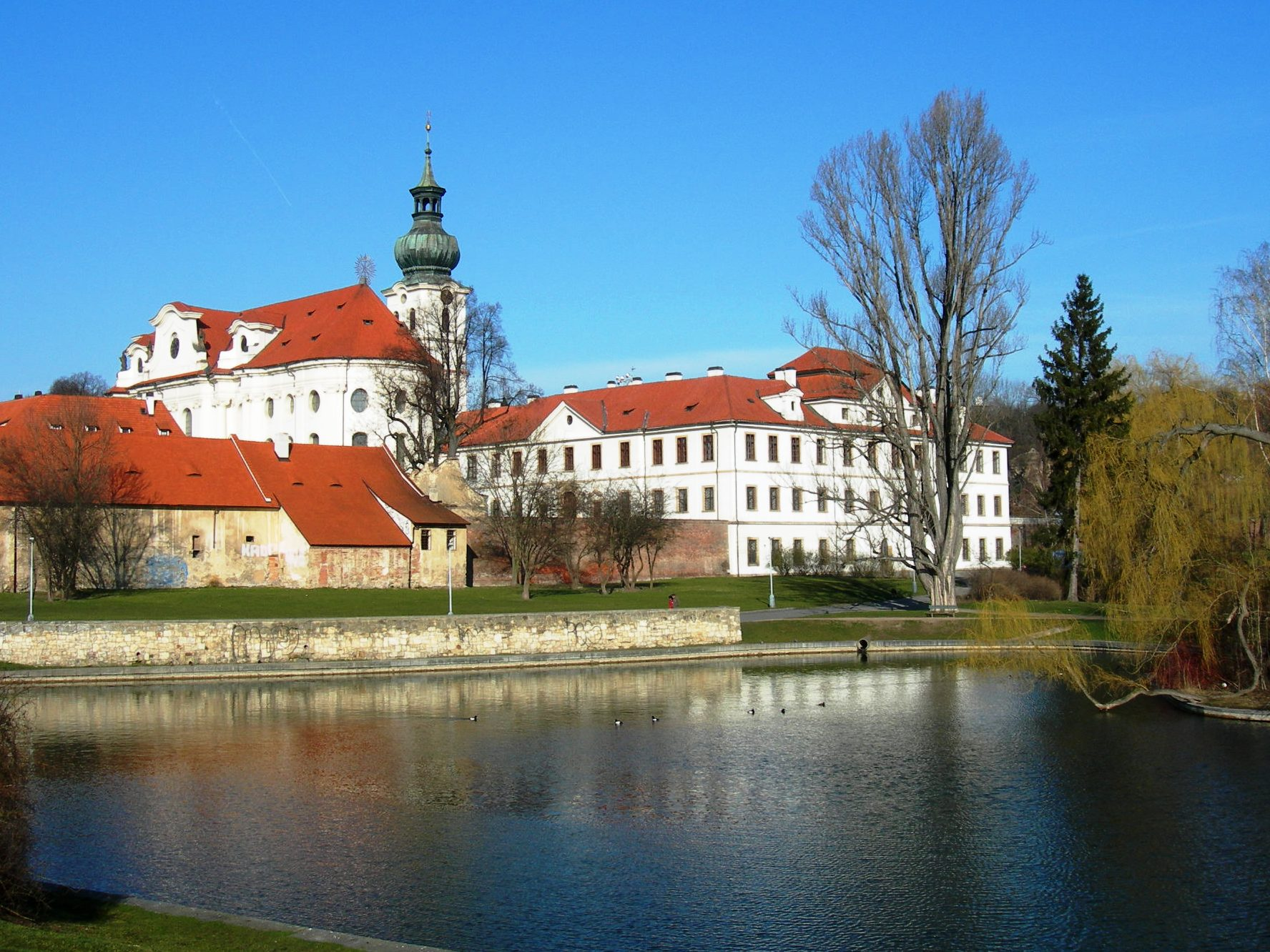
The Břevnov Monastery

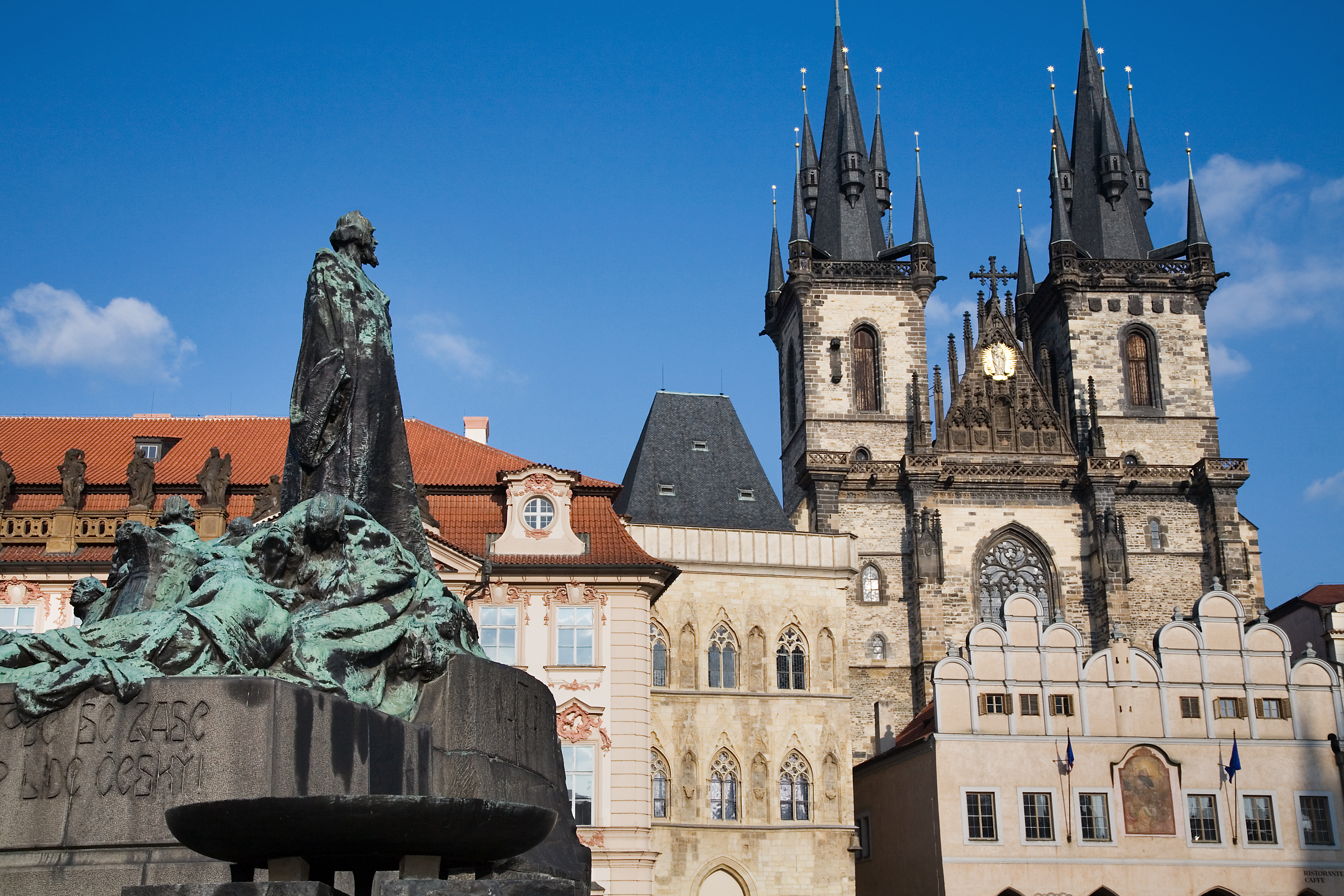
Church of Our Lady before Týn

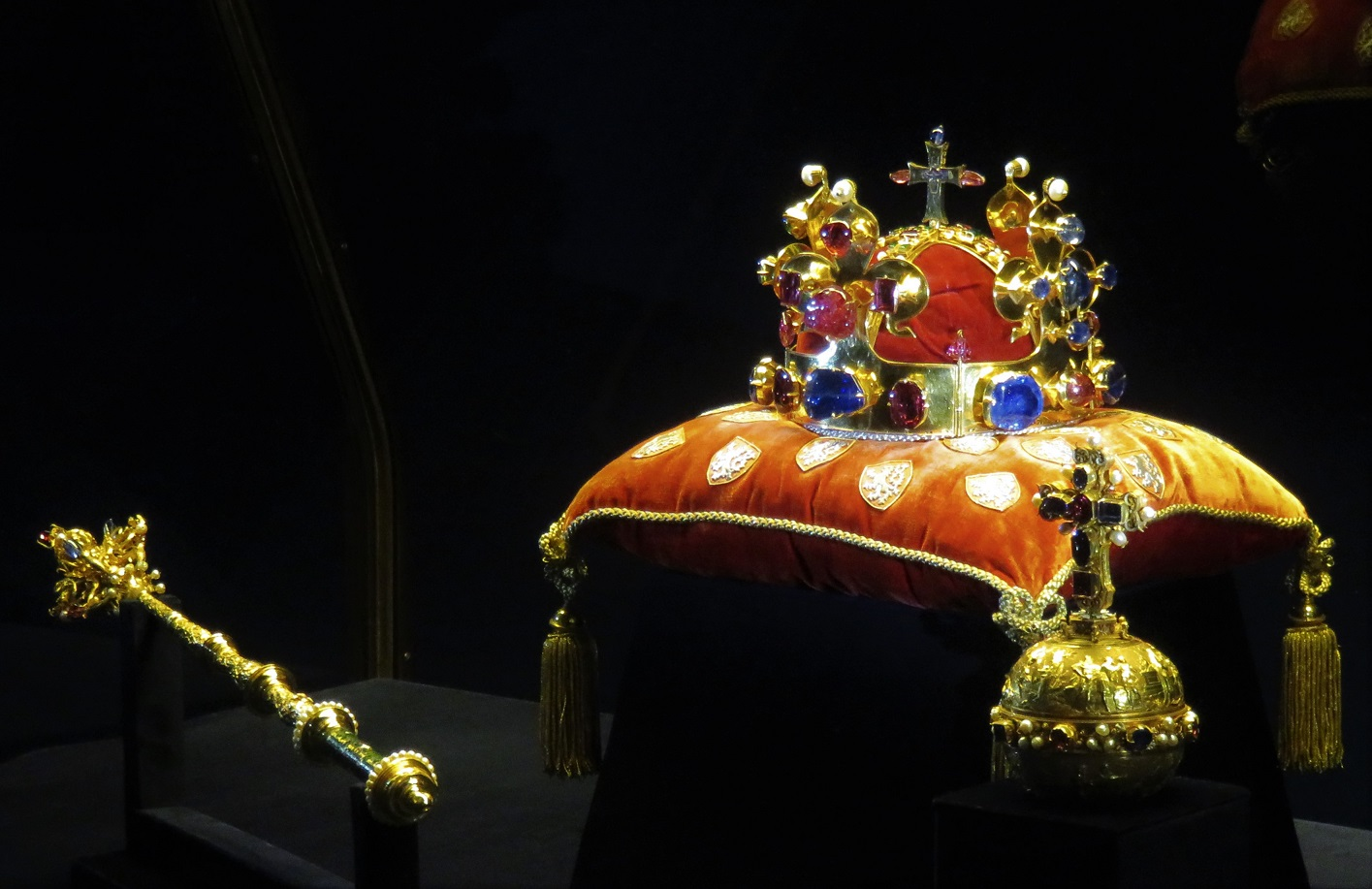
The Bohemian Crown Jewels, including the Crown of Saint Wenceslas, the royal orb, and sceptre

Churches in Prague

- All Saints Church
- Basilica of St. Peter and St. Paul
- Basilica of the Assumption
- Břevnov Monastery
- Cathedral of Saint Lawrence
- Church of Our Lady before Týn
- Church of Our Lady of the Snows
- Church of Saint Michael the Archangel in Prague
- Church of St. James the Greater
- Church of St. Martin in the Wall
- Church of St. Apollinaire
- Church of Sts. Simon and Jude
- Church of the Most Sacred Heart of Our Lord
- Hus' House
- Ss. Cyril and Methodius Cathedral
- St. Clement's Cathedral
- St. George's Basilica
- St. George's Convent
- St. Giles' Church
- St. Longin's Rotunda
- St. Nicholas Church (Malá Strana)
- St. Nicholas Church (Staré Město)
- St. Salvator Church
- St Thomas' Church
- St. Vitus Cathedral
  - Bohemian Crown Jewels
    - Crown of Saint Wenceslas
  - Treasury of St. Vitus Cathedral
- St. Wenceslas Church
- Strahov Monastery

==== Secular buildings in Prague ====
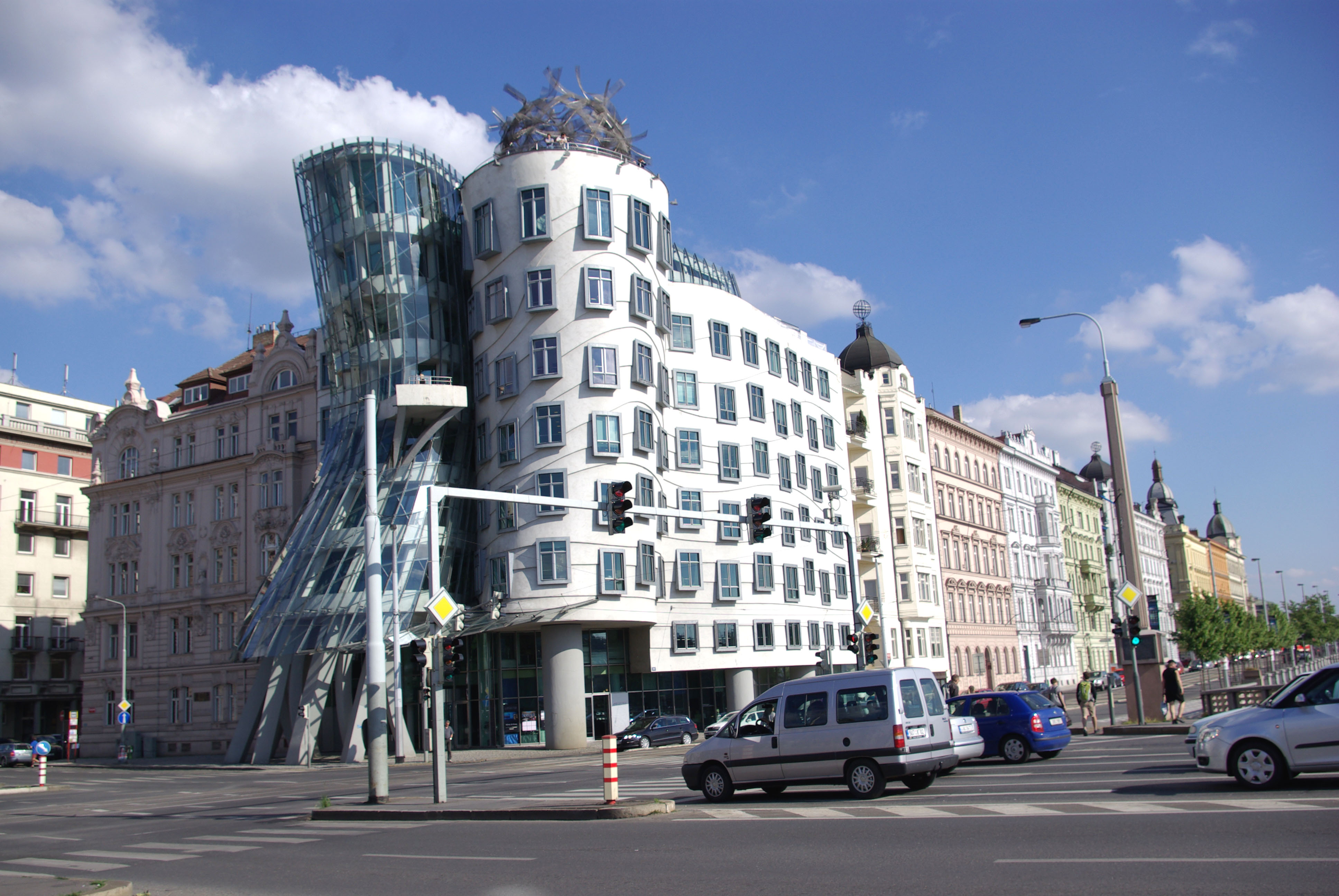
The Dancing House

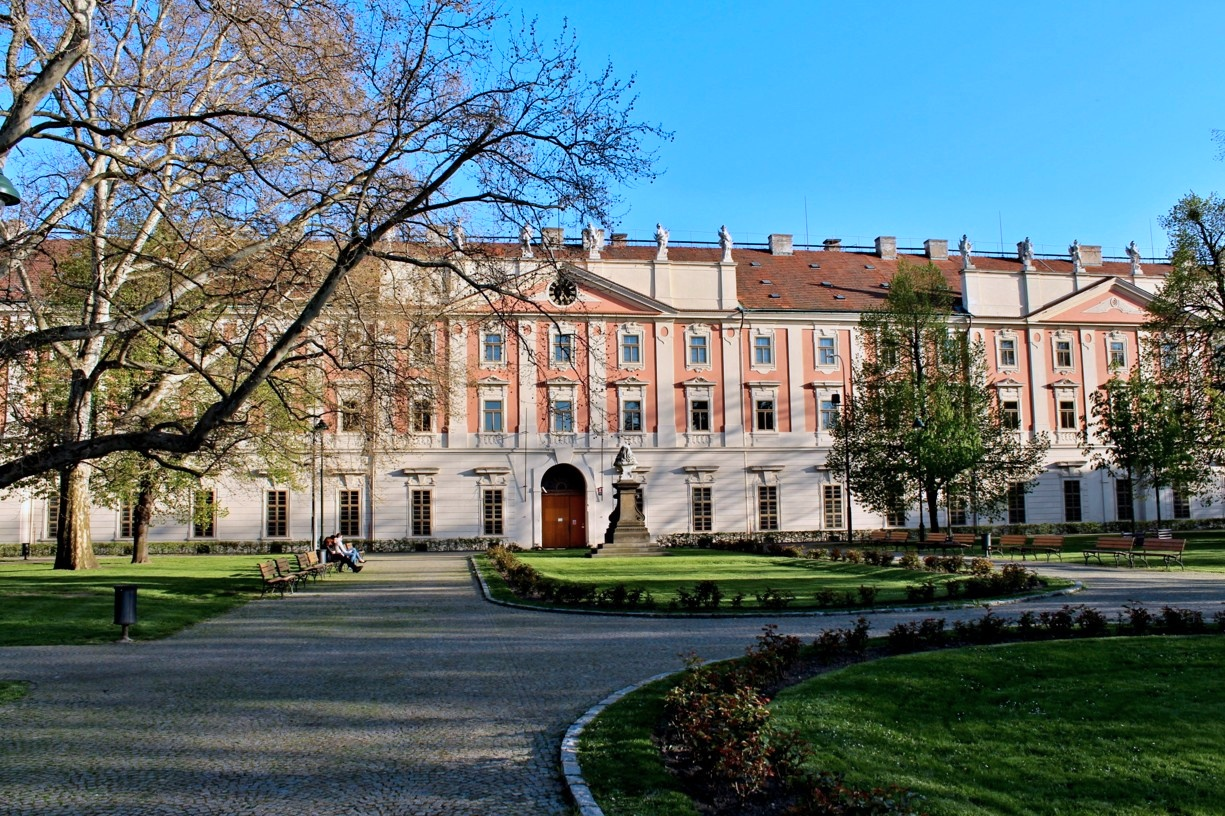
Invalidovna

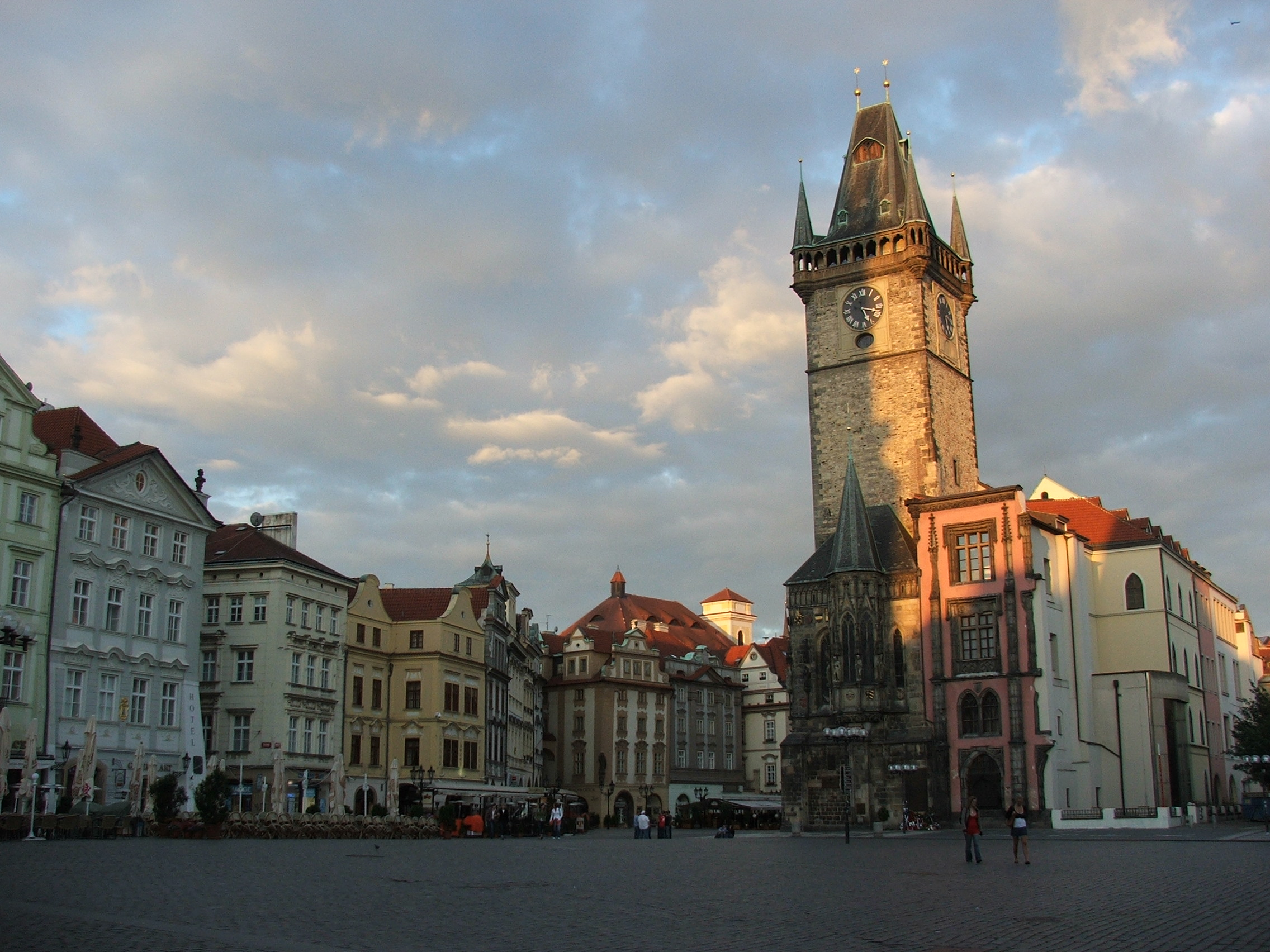
Old Town Hall

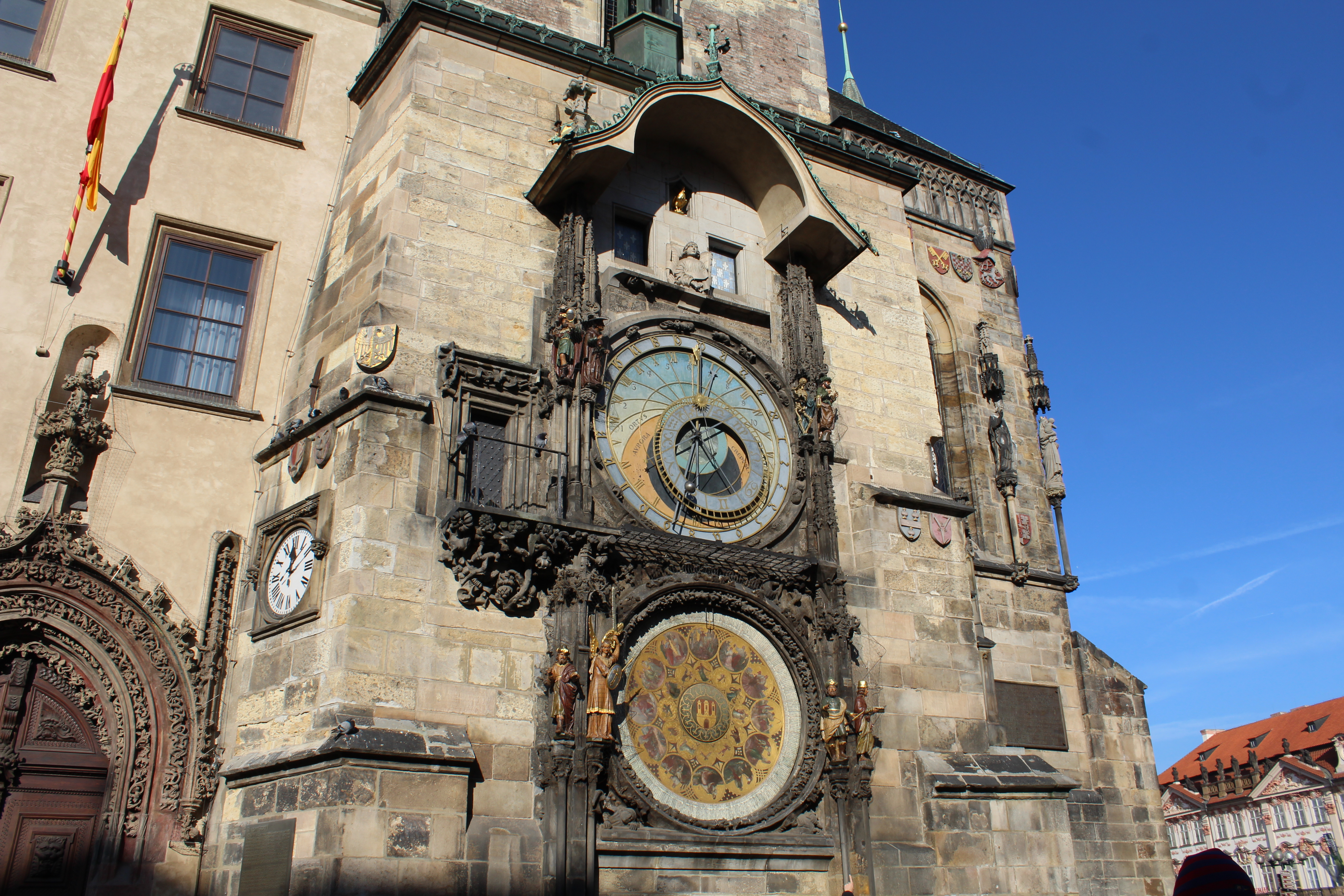
Prague astronomical clock, a medieval astronomical clock which dates back to 1410

- A Studio Rubín
- Barrandov Terraces
- Clementinum
  - National Library of the Czech Republic
- City Tower
- City Empiria
- Dancing House
- Domovina
- Golden Angel
- House at the Two Golden Bears
- House of the Black Madonna
- Invalidovna
- Karolinum
- Molochov
- Municipal House
- Municipal Library of Prague
- New Town Hall
- Old Town Hall
  - Prague astronomical clock
- Pankrác Prison
- Planetárium Praha
- Prague City Archives
- Prague Towers
- Rangherka
- Rezidence Eliška
- Rudolfinum
- Škoda Palace
- Štefánik's Observatory
- Stone Bell House
- Transgas (building)
- V Tower
- Valkounsky House
- Výstaviště Praha

==== Streets in Prague ====
- Celetná
- Na příkopě
- Národní

==== Theatres in Prague ====
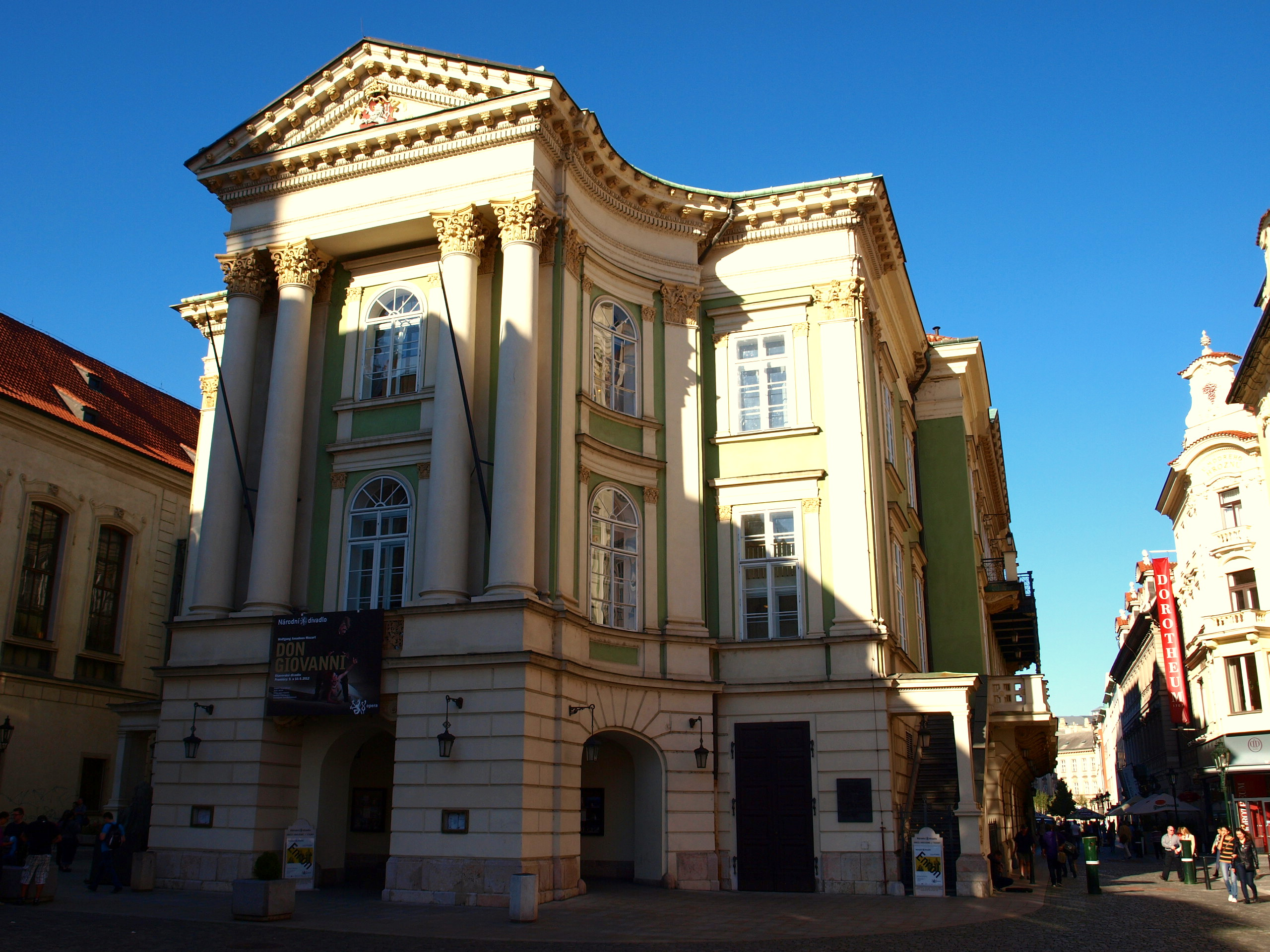
The Estates Theatre

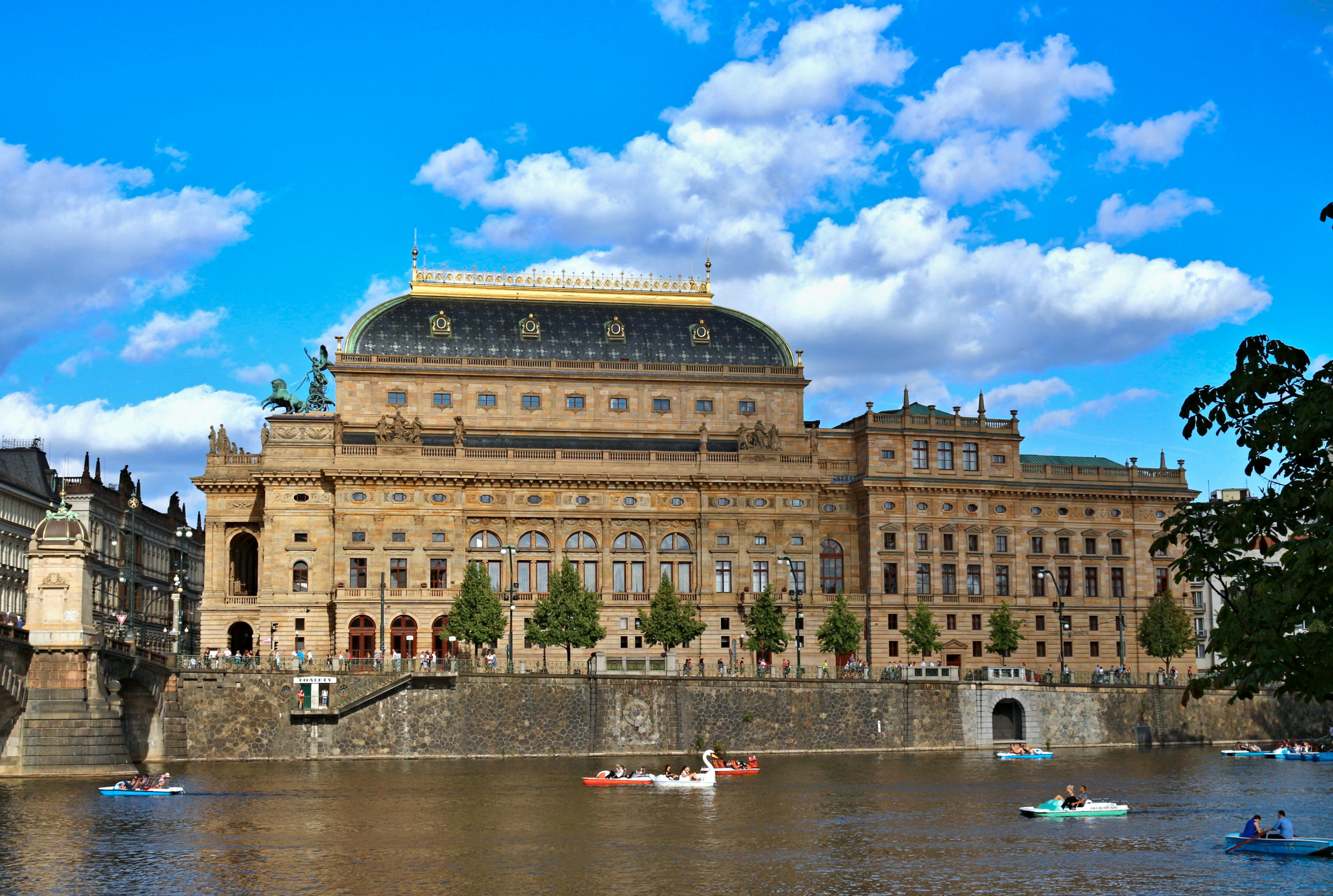
The National Theatre

- Broadway Theatre
- Divadlo DISK
- Divadlo na Fidlovačce
- The Drama Club
- Estates Theatre
- Laterna Magika
- Millennium Theatre
- Musical Theatre Karlín
- National Marionette Theatre
- National Theatre
- Provisional Theatre
- Semafor
- Spejbl and Hurvínek Theatre
- Theatre on the Balustrade
- Vinohrady Theatre

==== Towers in Prague ====
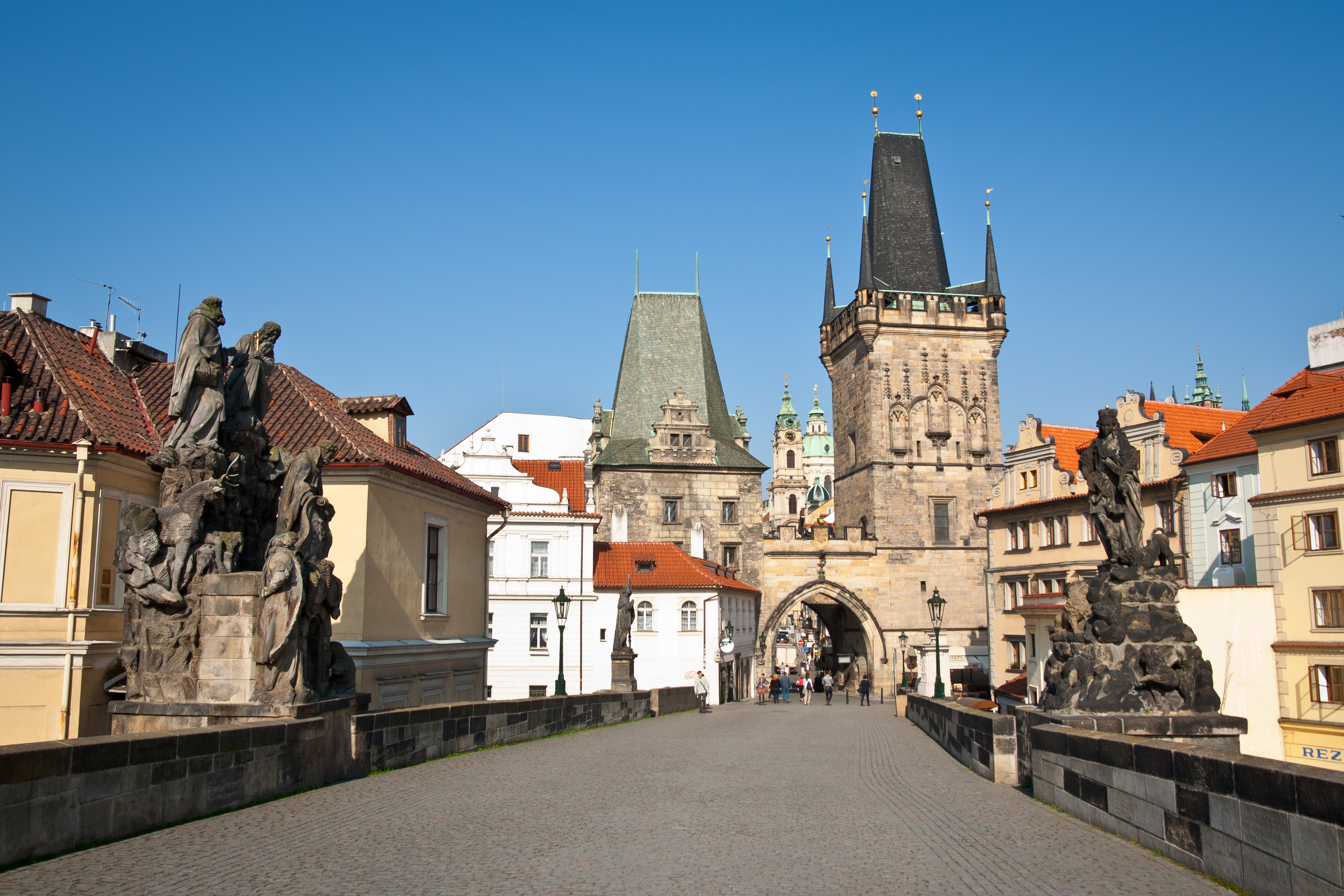
Malá Strana Bridge Tower

Tallest structures in Prague

- Malá Strana Bridge Tower
- Old Town Bridge Tower
- Petřín Lookout Tower
- Vinohrady Water Tower
- Žižkov Television Tower

=== Demographics of Prague ===
Demographics of Prague

== Government and politics of Prague ==
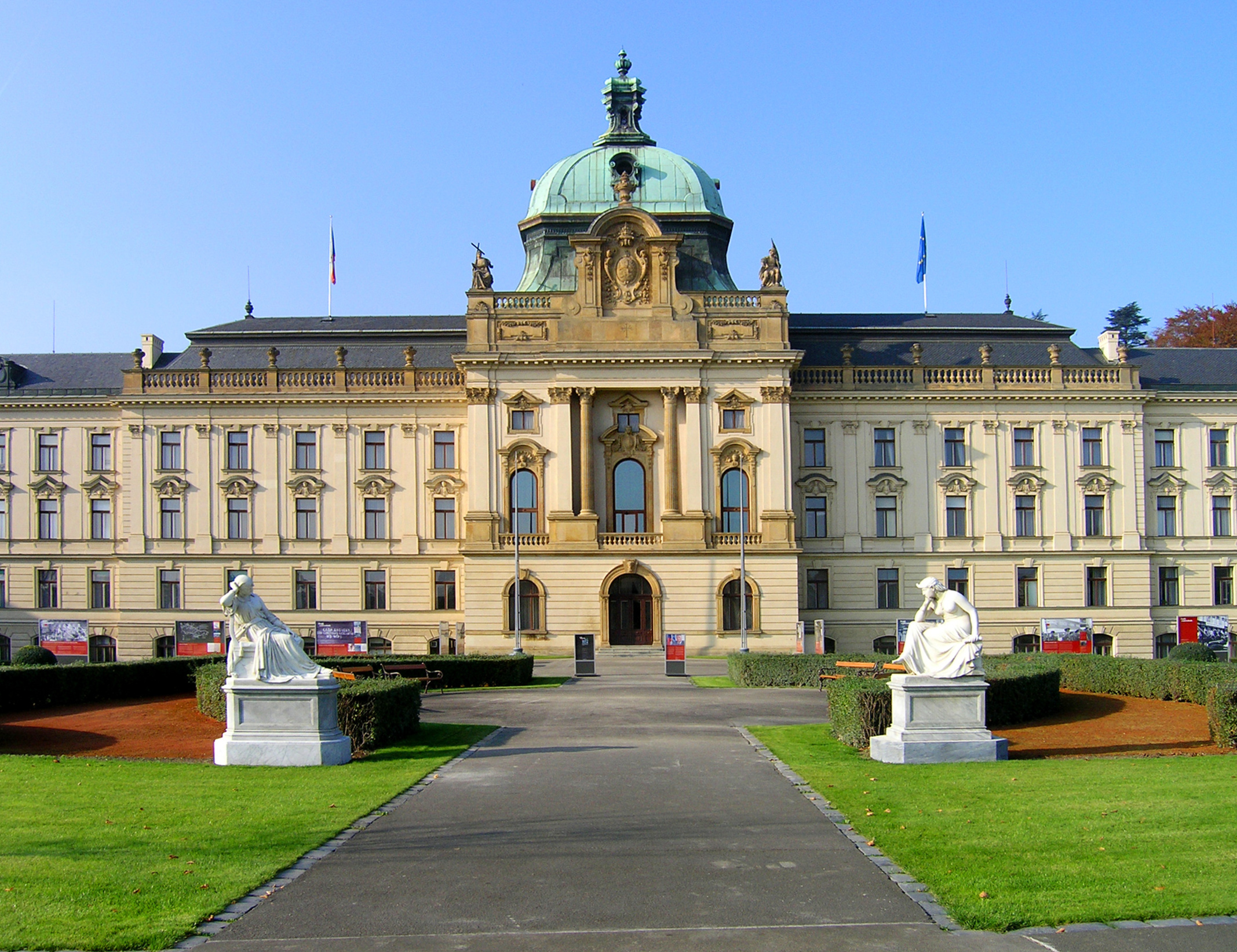
Straka Academy, seat of the government of the Czech Republic

Politics of Prague

- Mayors of Prague

=== International relations of Prague ===
International relations of Prague

=== Law and order in Prague ===
- Prague Castle Guard

== History of Prague ==
History of Prague

=== History of Prague, by period or event ===
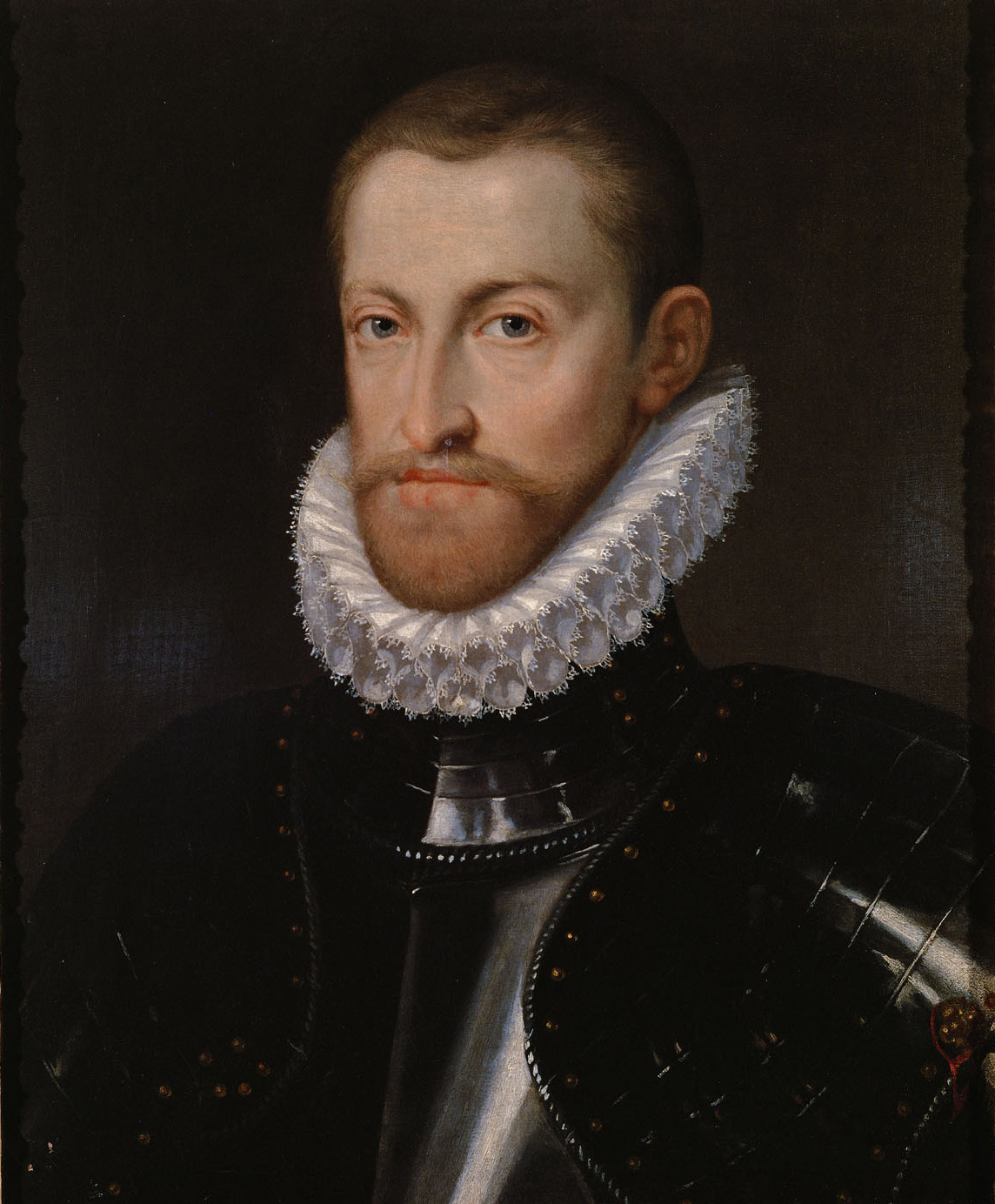
Rudolf II, Holy Roman Emperor

Timeline of Prague

- Beginnings and early Middle Ages
  - The Přemyslid dynasty rules most of Bohemia (900–1306)
  - The reign of Charles IV, of the Luxembourg dynasty (1346–1378)
  - First Defenestration of Prague (1419)
  - Holy Roman Emperor Rudolf II, of the House of Habsburg, is elected King of Bohemia in 1576, and moves the Habsburg capital from Vienna to Prague in 1583.
  - Second Defenestration of Prague (1618)
- Prague during the 18th century
- Prague during the 19th century
- Prague during the 20th century
  - 1945 Bombing of Prague (1945)
  - Prague uprising (1945)
  - Prague Spring (1968)
- Contemporary Era
  - Velvet Revolution (1989)

=== History of Prague, by subject ===
- History of the Jews in Prague

== Culture of Prague ==
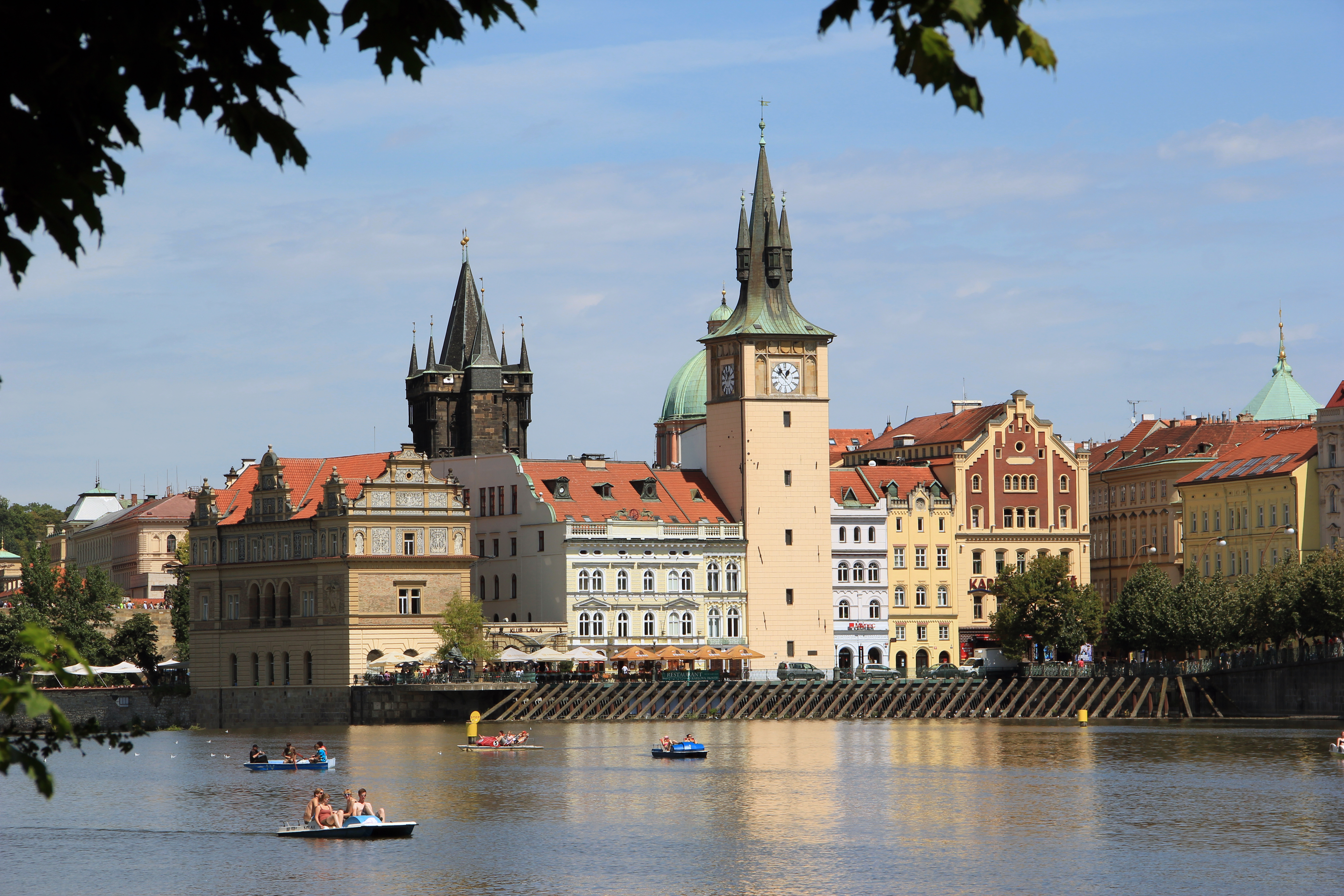
Architecture of the Old Town

Culture of Prague

- Prague underground (culture)

=== Arts in Prague ===
==== Architecture of Prague ====
The Municipal House

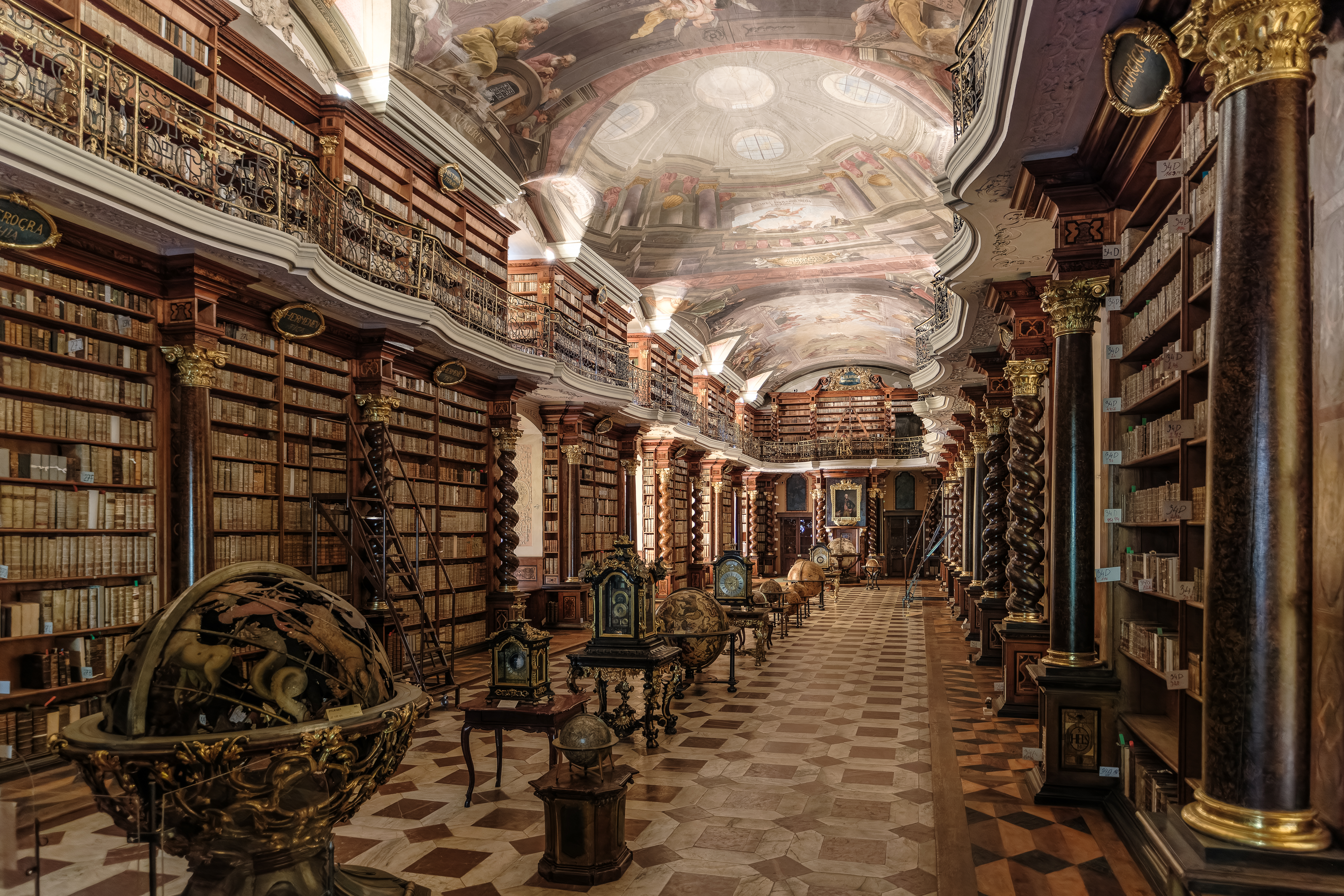
Baroque library hall in Clementinum

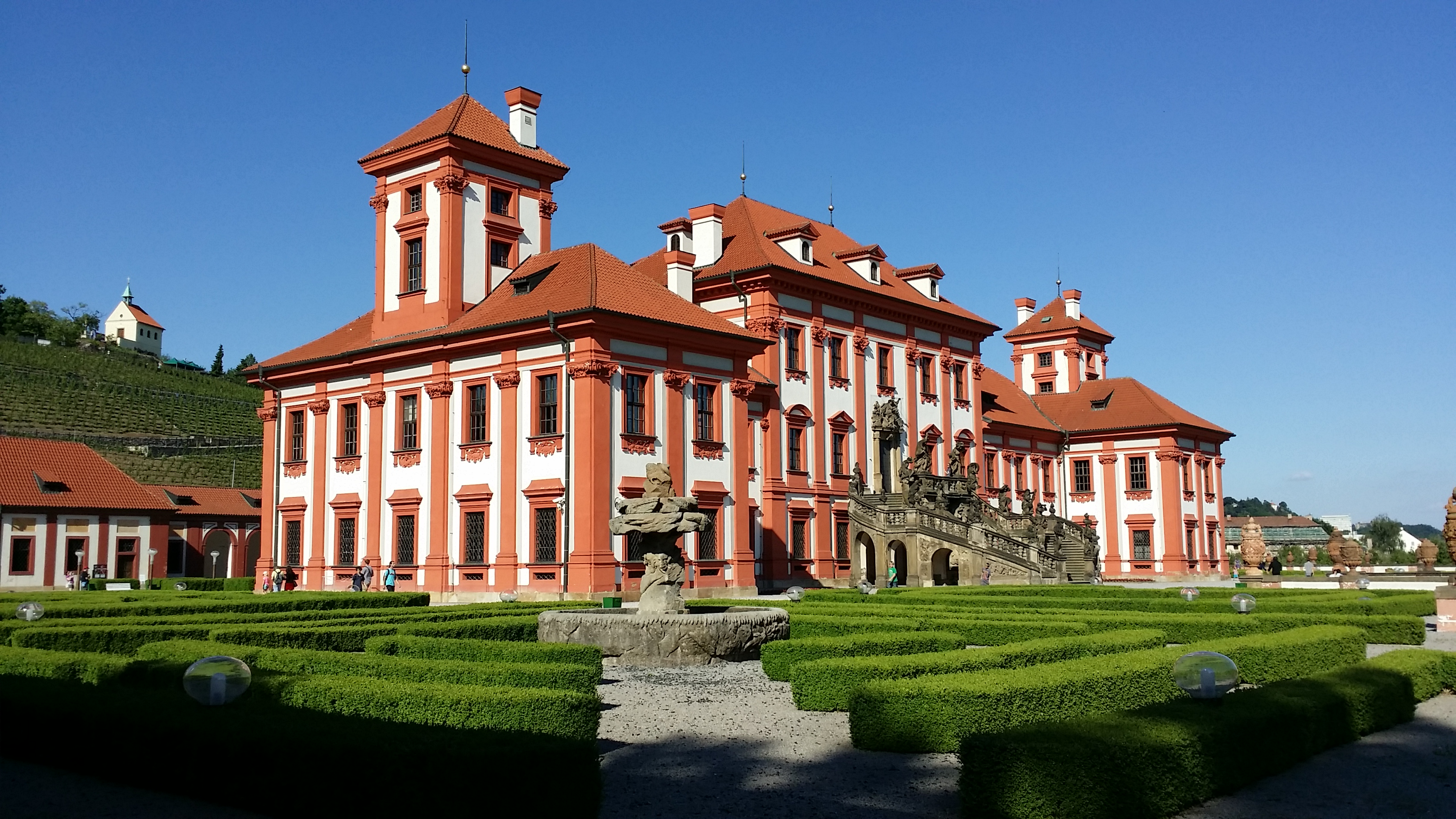
Troja Palace

List of tallest buildings in Prague

- Art Nouveau architecture in Prague
  - Hotel Paris
  - Municipal House
- Baroque architecture in Prague
  - Clementinum
  - Troja Palace
  - Wallenstein Palace
- Gothic architecture in Prague
  - Powder Tower
- Neoclassical architecture in Prague
  - Petschek Palace
- Neo-Renaissance architecture in Prague
  - Schebek Palace
  - Žofín Palace
- Postmodern architecture in Prague
  - Dancing House

==== Cinema of Prague ====
- Barrandov Studios
- Bio Oko
- Febiofest
- One World Film Festival
- Prague Independent Film Festival
- Prague Studios

==== Literature of Prague ====
- Prague linguistic circle

==== Music and ballet of Prague ====
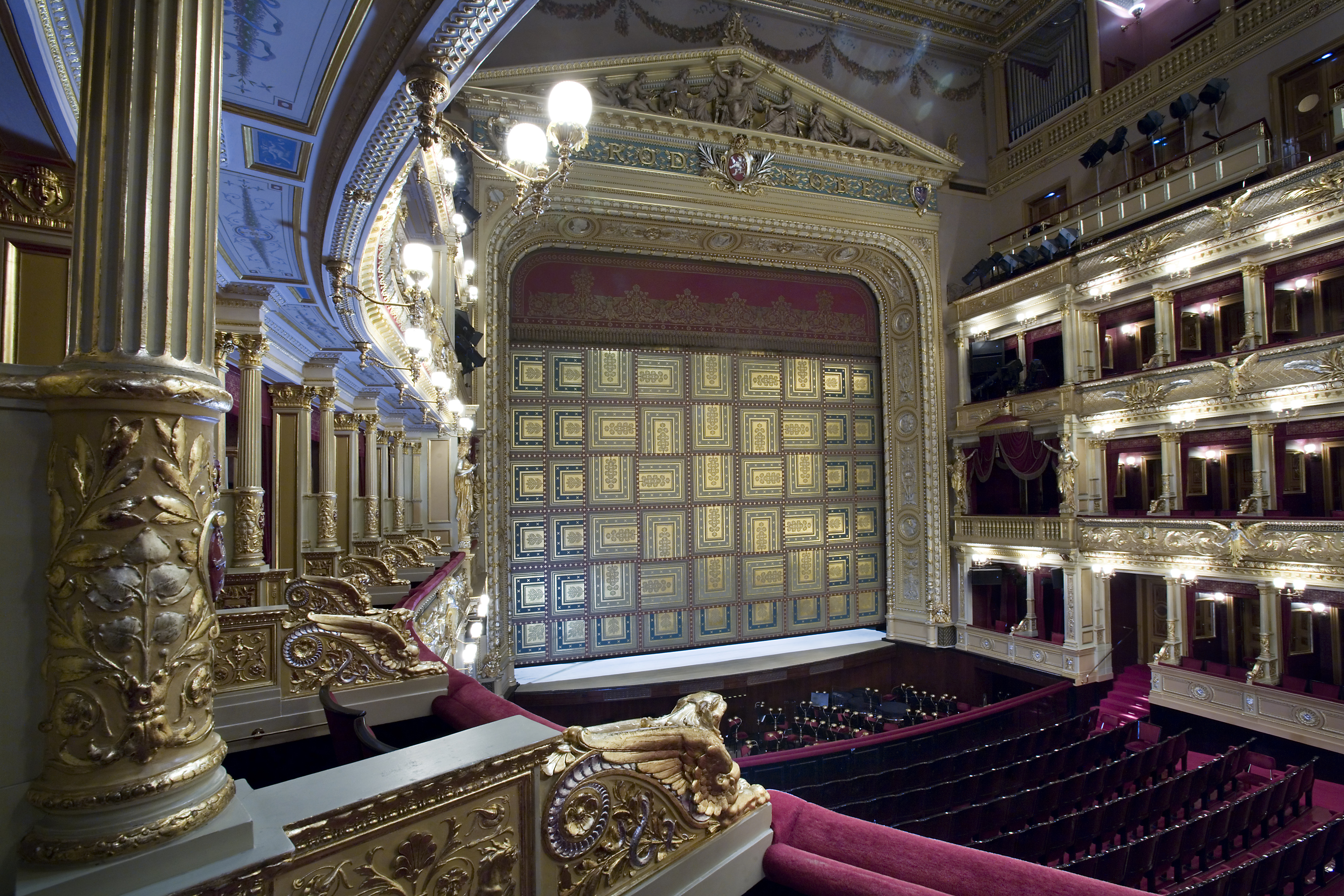
The auditorium of National Theatre

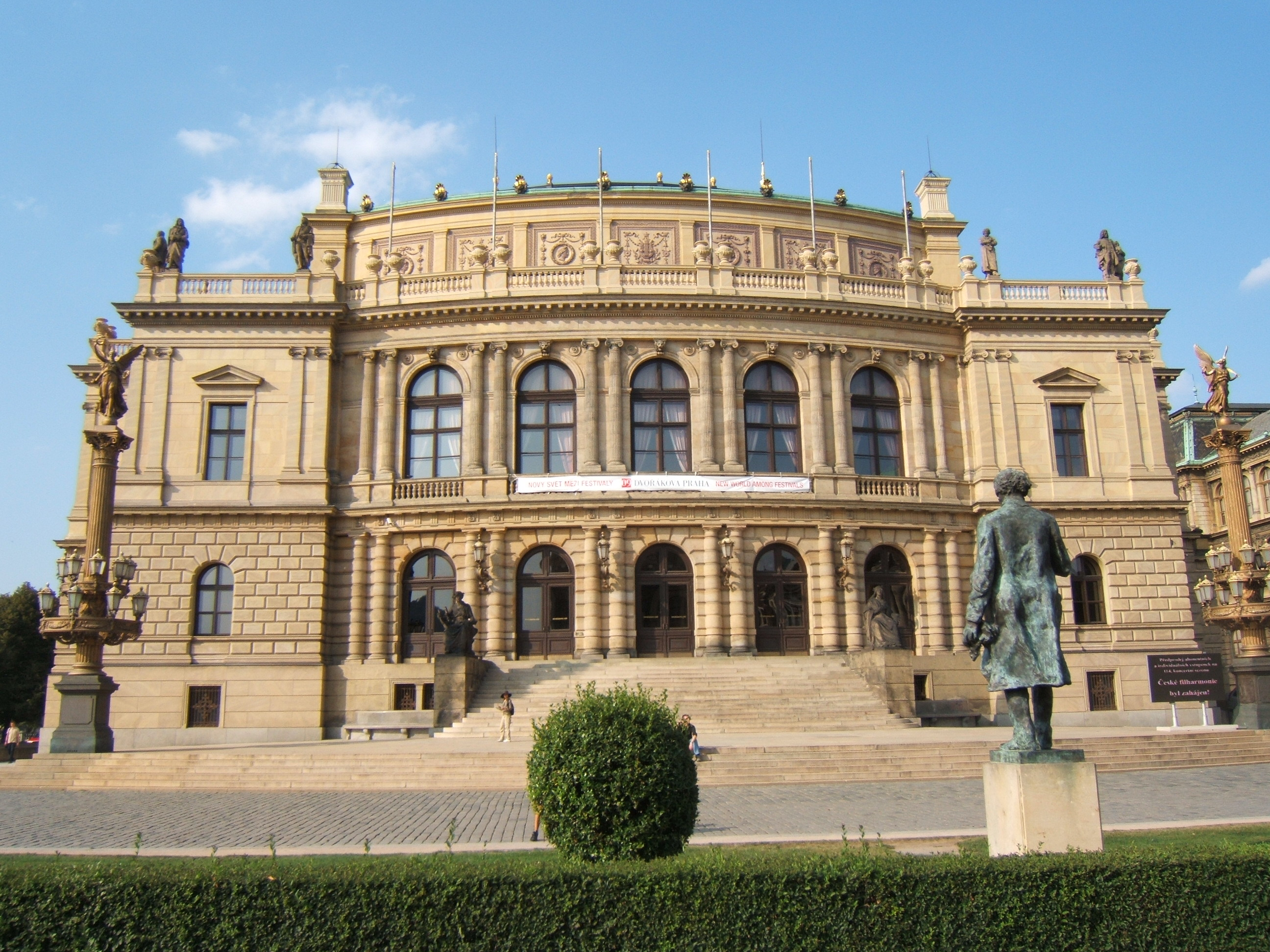
Rudolfinum, home of the Czech Philharmonic Orchestra and one of the main venues of the Prague Spring International Music Festival

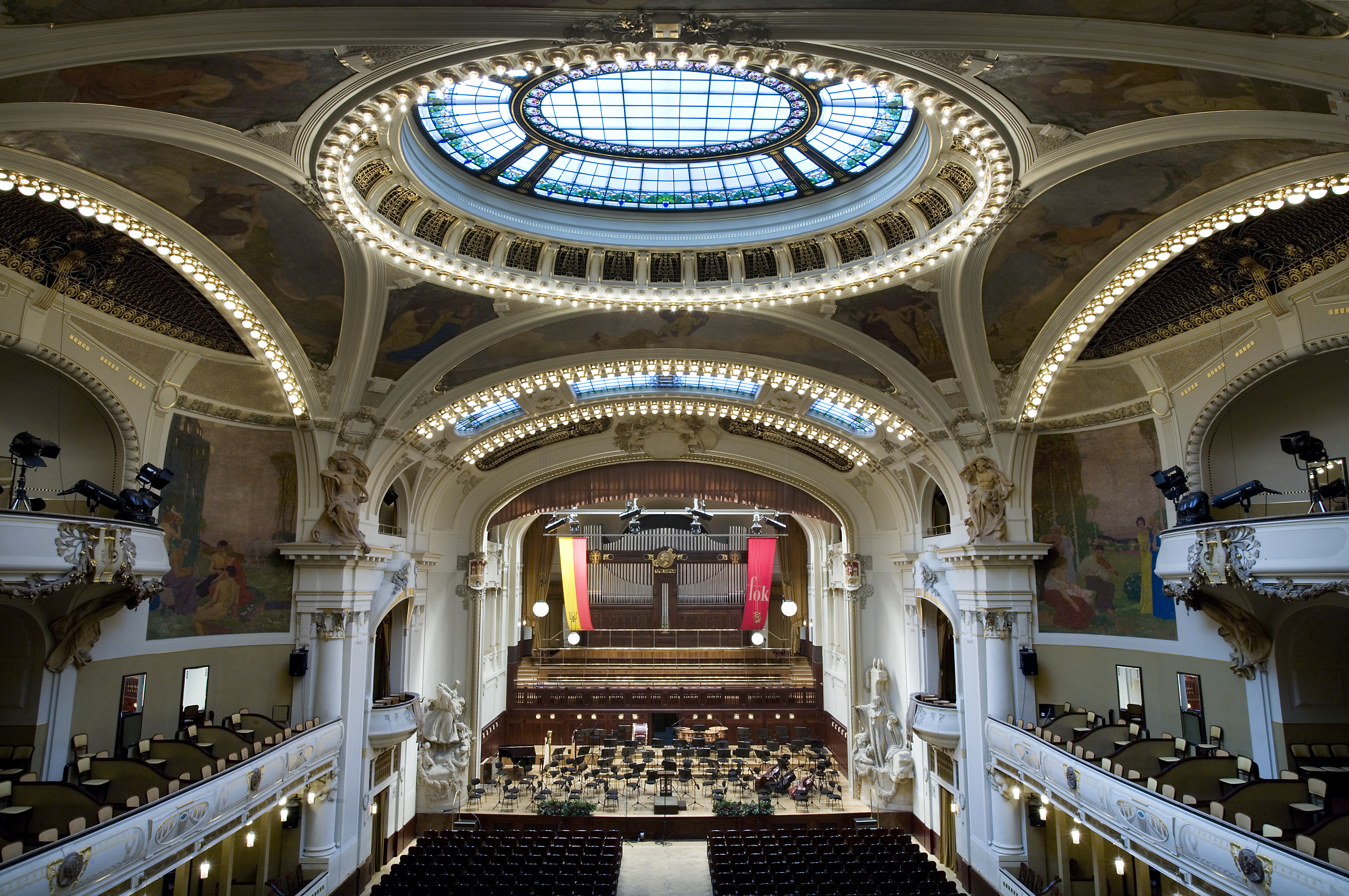
The Smetana Hall

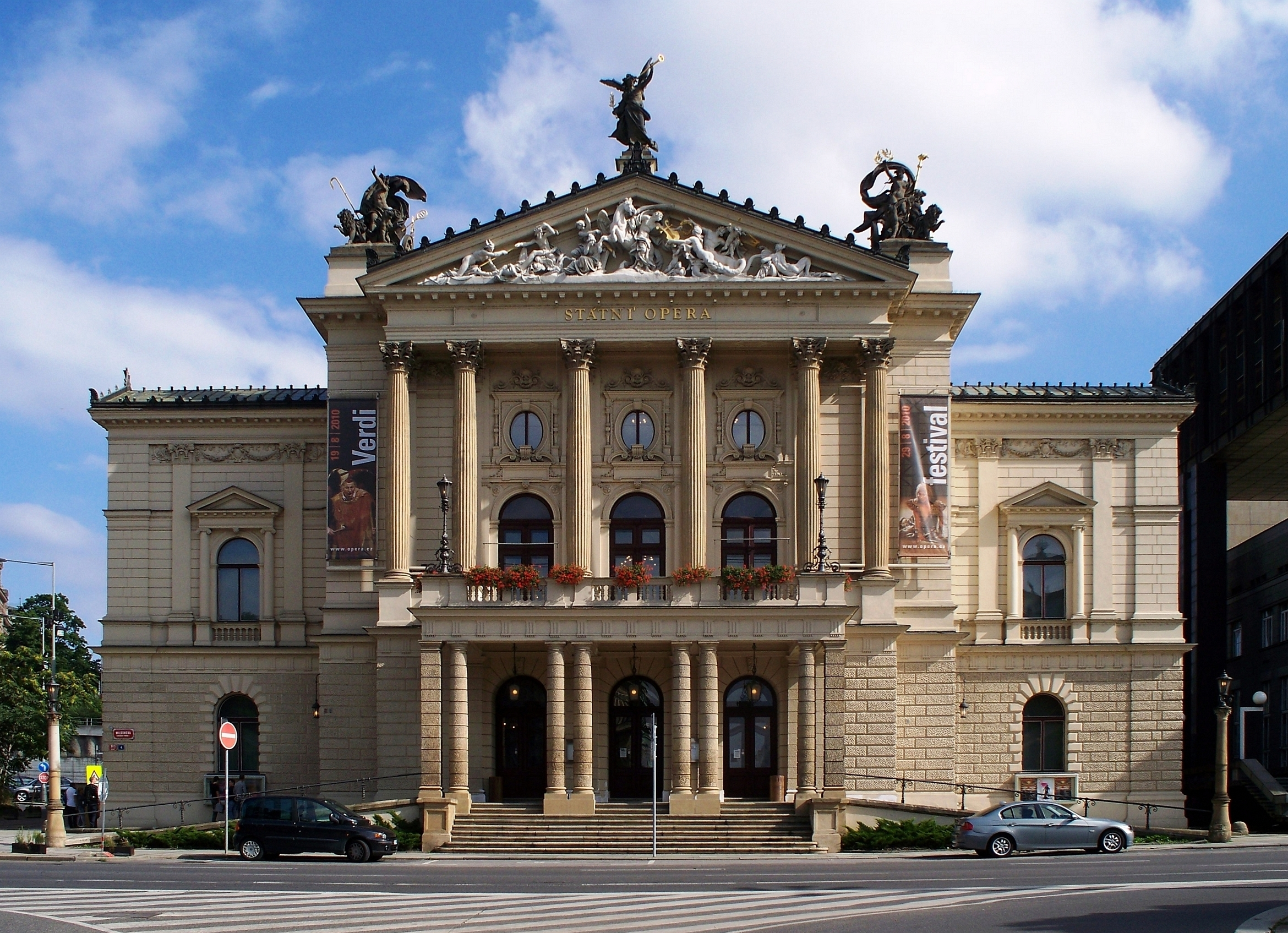
The State Opera

- Ballet of Prague
  - National Theatre Ballet
- Music festivals in Prague
  - Prague Autumn International Music Festival
  - Prague International Jazz Festival
  - Prague International Organ Festival
  - Prague Spring International Music Festival
- Music schools in Prague
  - Prague Conservatory
- Music venues in Prague
  - National Theatre
  - Rudolfinum
  - State Opera
- Musical compositions dedicated to Prague
  - Wolfgang Amadeus Mozart's Prague Symphony
- Musical ensembles in Prague
  - Band of the Castle Guards and the Police of the Czech Republic
  - Berg Orchestra
  - Bohemian Symphony Orchestra Prague
  - City of Prague Philharmonic Orchestra
  - Czech National Symphony Orchestra
  - Czech Philharmonic
  - Praga Sinfonietta Orchestra
  - Prague Philharmonia
  - Prague Philharmonic Orchestra
  - Prague Quartet
  - Prague Radio Symphony Orchestra
  - Prague Symphony Orchestra
- Musicians from Prague
  - Ignaz Moscheles
  - Josef Mysliveček
- Wolfgang Amadeus Mozart and Prague

==== Theatre of Prague ====
- Black light theatre
- Prague Quadrennial

==== Visual arts of Prague ====
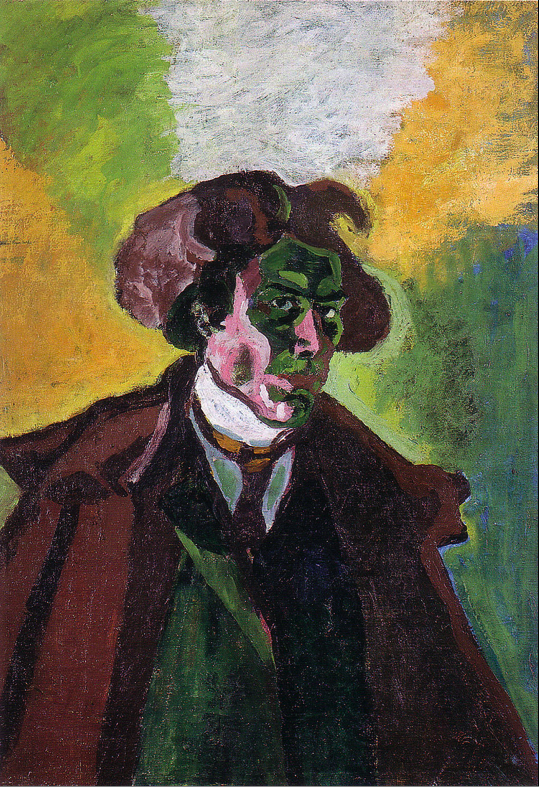
Self-portrait by Bohumil Kubišta, member of the Czech Cubism movement

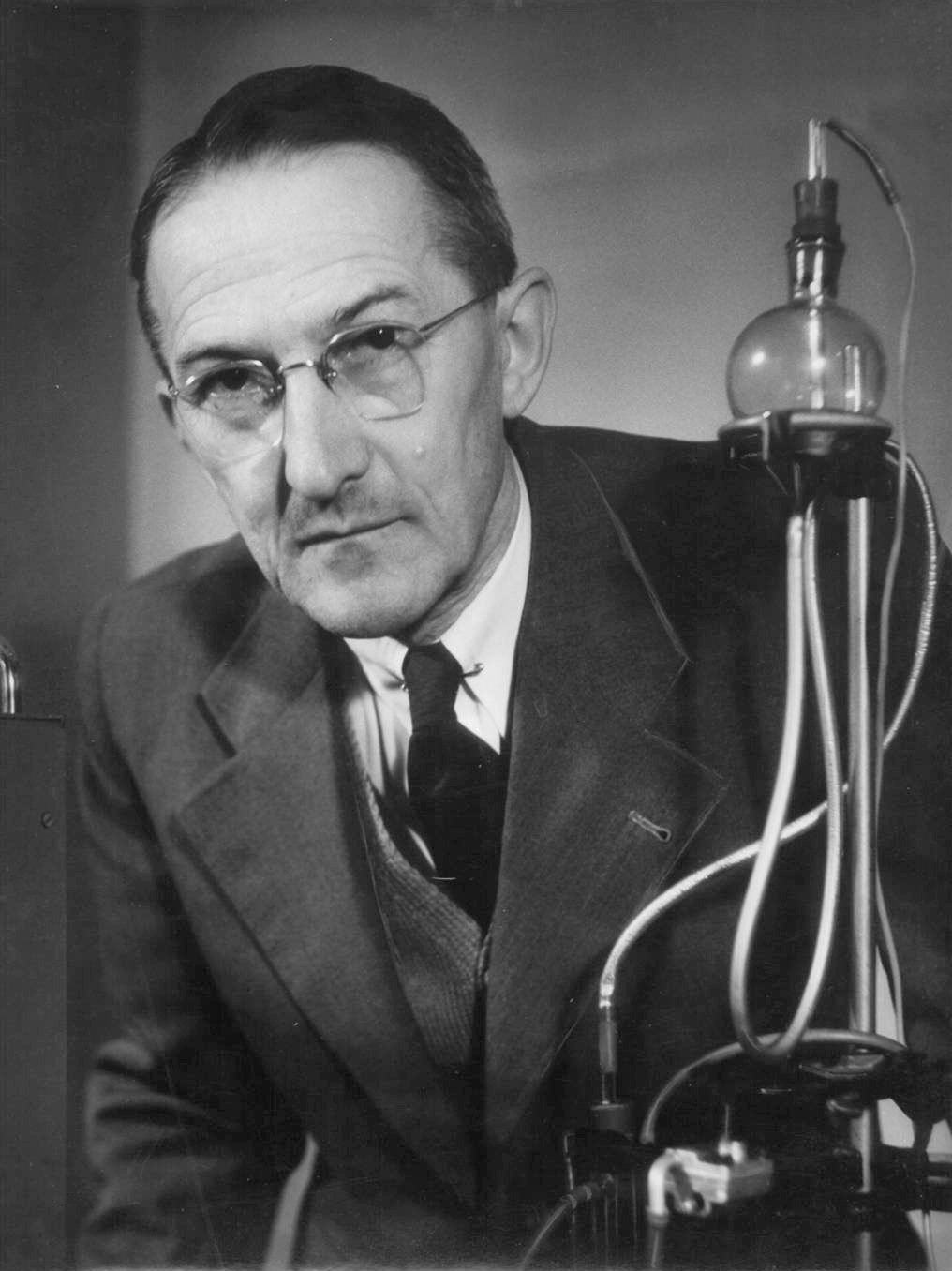
Jaroslav Heyrovský, recipient of the Nobel Prize in 1959 for his discovery and development of the polarographic methods of analysis

- Czech Cubism
- Prague Biennale

Public art in Prague

- Libuše and Přemysl
- Lumír and Píseň
- Piss
- Polibek
- Youth
- Záboj and Slavoj

Cuisine of Prague

- Beer in Prague
- Prague Ham
- Wine in Prague

Events in Prague

- Prague Fringe Festival
- Prague Writers' Festival
- Signal Festival
- Summer Shakespeare Festival

Languages of Prague

- Czech language
- Prague German language

Media in Prague

- Newspapers in Prague
  - Lidové noviny
  - Prager Zeitung
- Radio and television in Prague
  - Prima televize

People from Prague

- List of people from Prague
  - Václav Havel
  - Jaroslav Heyrovský
  - Karl Deutsch
  - Rainer Maria Rilke

=== Religion in Prague ===
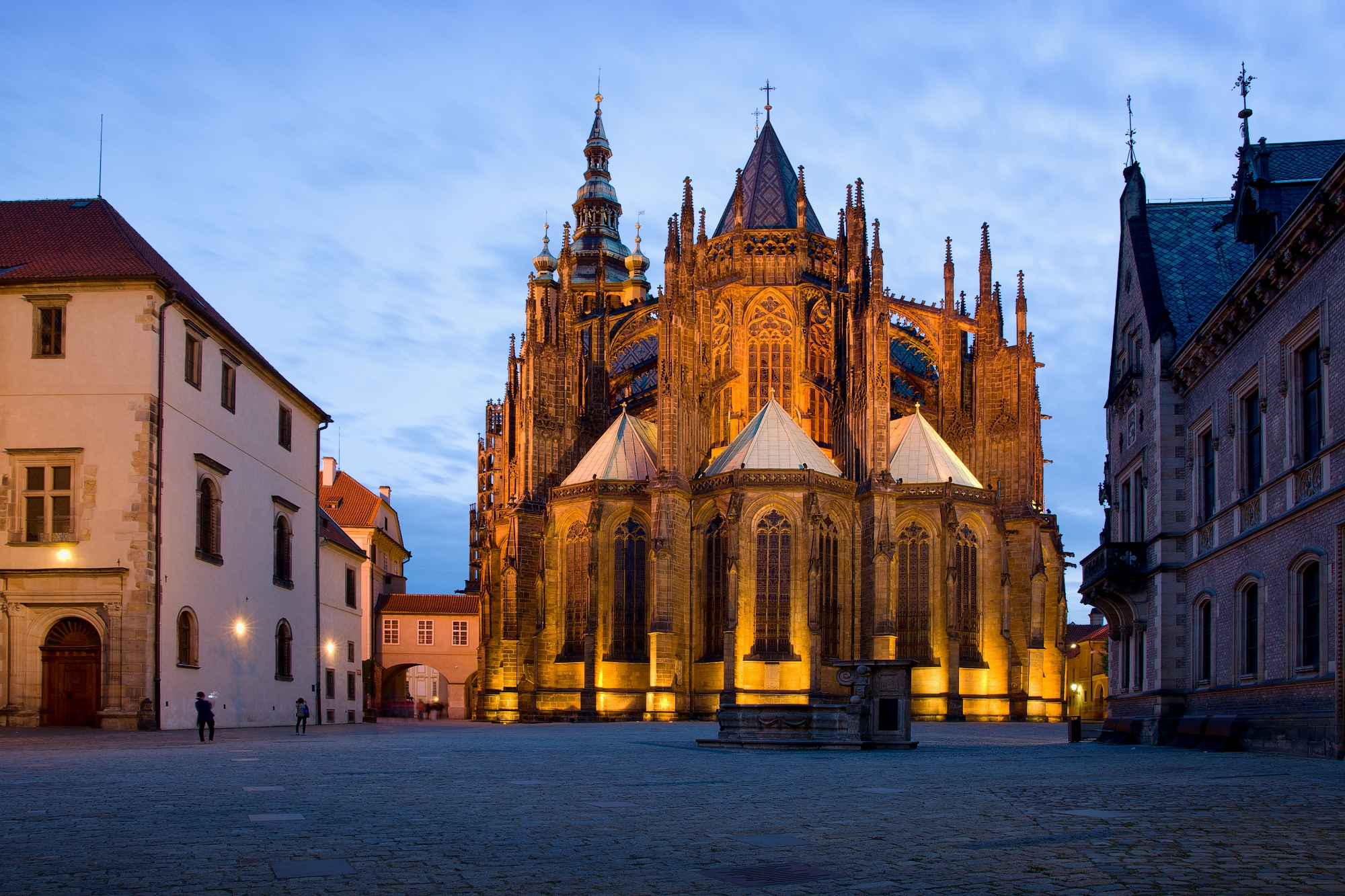
Chevet of St. Vitus Cathedral

Religion in Prague

- Catholicism in Prague
  - Bishops and archbishops of Prague
  - Roman Catholic Archdiocese of Prague
    - St. Vitus Cathedral
- Judaism in Prague
  - Jubilee Synagogue
  - Old New Synagogue

=== Sports in Prague ===
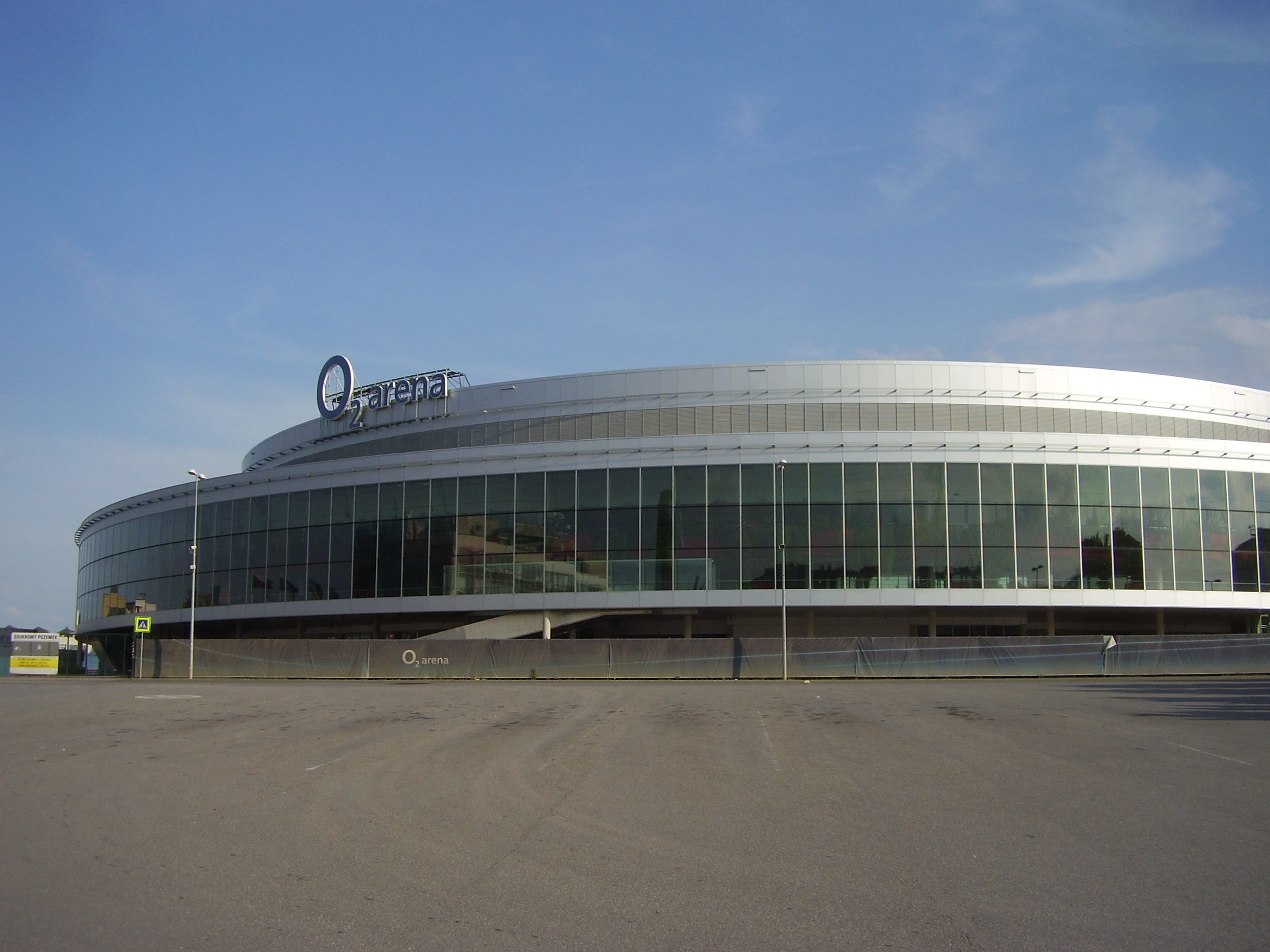
O2 Arena

Sport in Prague

- Football in Prague
  - Association football in Prague
    - Bohemians 1905
    - FK Dukla Prague
    - AC Sparta Prague
    - SK Slavia Prague
  - Prague derby
- Ice hockey in Prague
  - HC Sparta Praha
  - HC Slavia Praha
- Sports competitions in Prague
  - Czech Hockey Games
  - Josef Odložil Memorial
  - Prague Classic
  - Prague Grand Prix
  - Prague Half Marathon
  - Prague Marathon
  - Prague Golf Challenge
  - I.ČLTK Prague Open
  - Sparta Prague Open Challenger
  - WTA Prague Open
- Sports venues in Prague
  - Ďolíček
  - Stadion Evžena Rošického
  - FK Viktoria Stadion
  - Fortuna Arena
  - Stadion Juliska
  - Stadion Letná
  - Stadion Lokomotiva Praha
  - Stadion SK Prosek
  - Na Chvalech
  - Královka Arena
  - Markéta Stadium
  - O2 Arena
  - Sportovní hala Fortuna

== Economy and infrastructure of Prague ==
Economy of Prague

- Communications in Prague
  - Prague pneumatic post

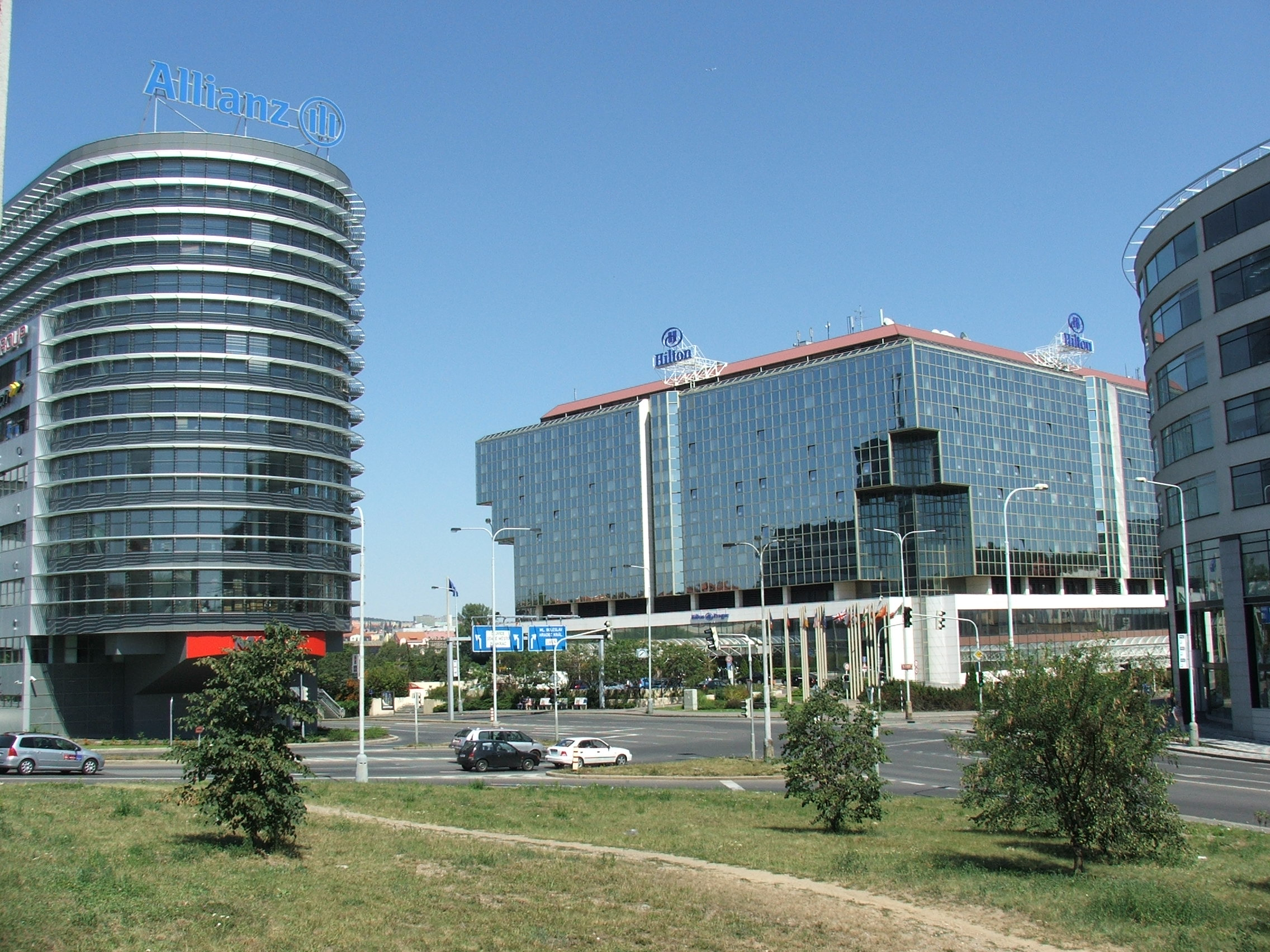
Hilton Prague

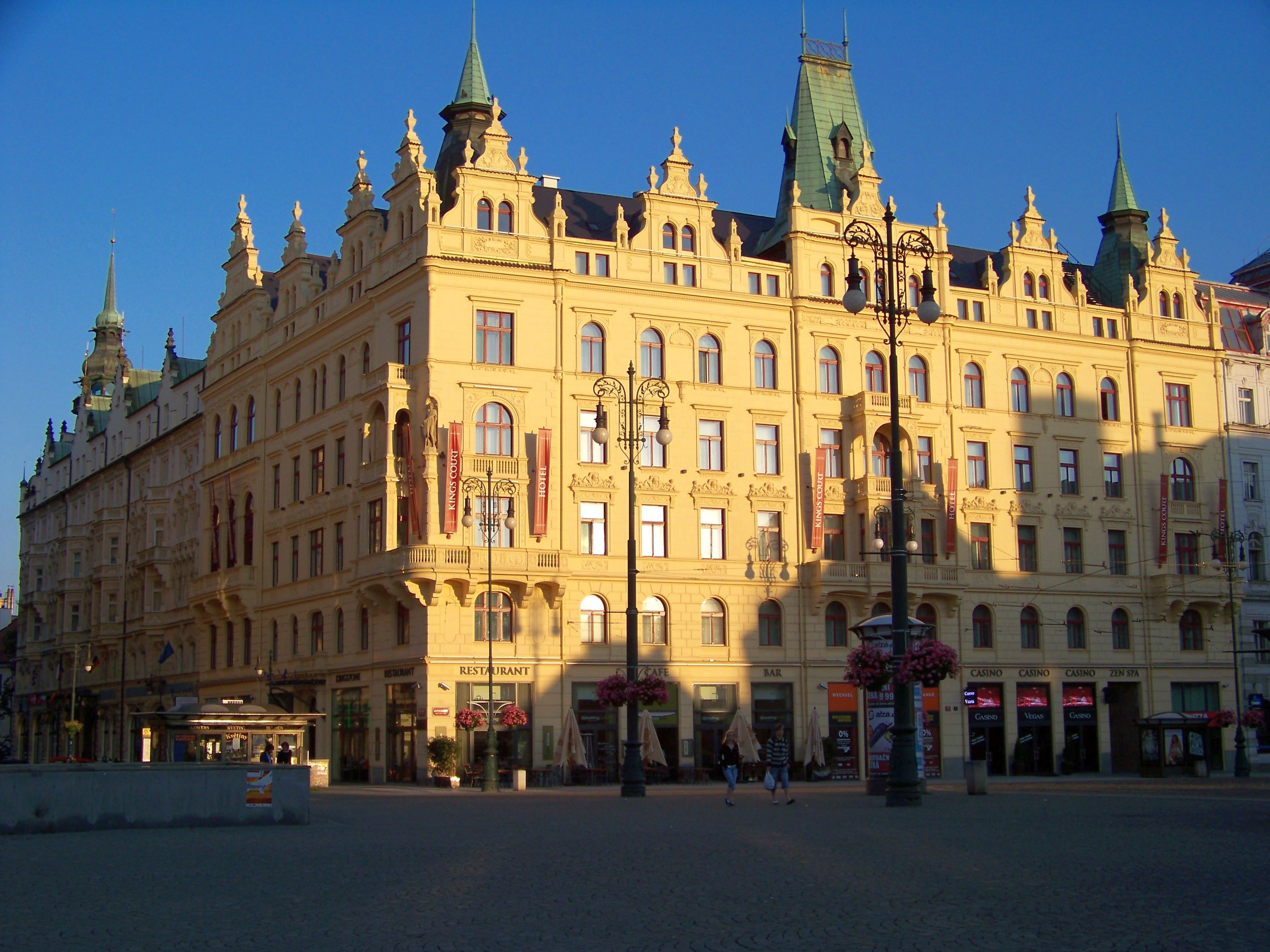
Hotel Paris

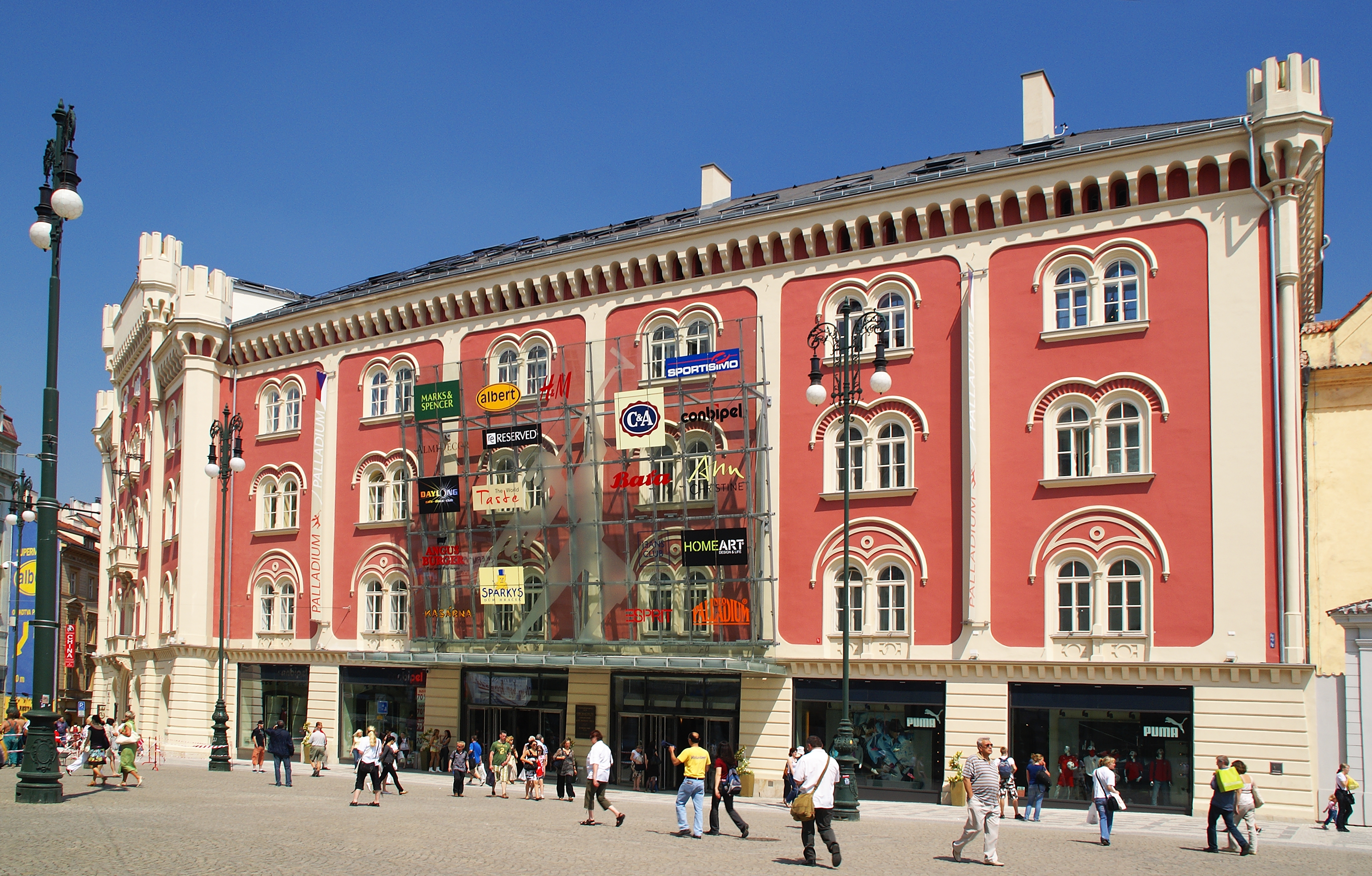
The Palladium

- Financial services in Prague
  - Czech National Bank
  - Prague Stock Exchange
- Hotels in Prague
  - Corinthia Hotel Prague
  - Four Seasons Hotel
  - Hilton Prague
  - Hotel InterContinental Prague
  - Hotel International Prague
  - Hotel Olympik
  - Hotel Paris
  - Radisson Blu Alcron Hotel
- Restaurants and cafés in Prague
  - Allegro
  - Café Slavia
  - La Degustation
  - U Fleků
  - Výtopna
- Shopping malls and markets in Prague
  - Centrum Chodov
  - Dejvická Farmers' Market
  - Kotva Department Store
  - Nový Smíchov
  - Obchodní centrum Letňany
  - Palladium
- Tourism in Prague

=== Transportation in Prague ===
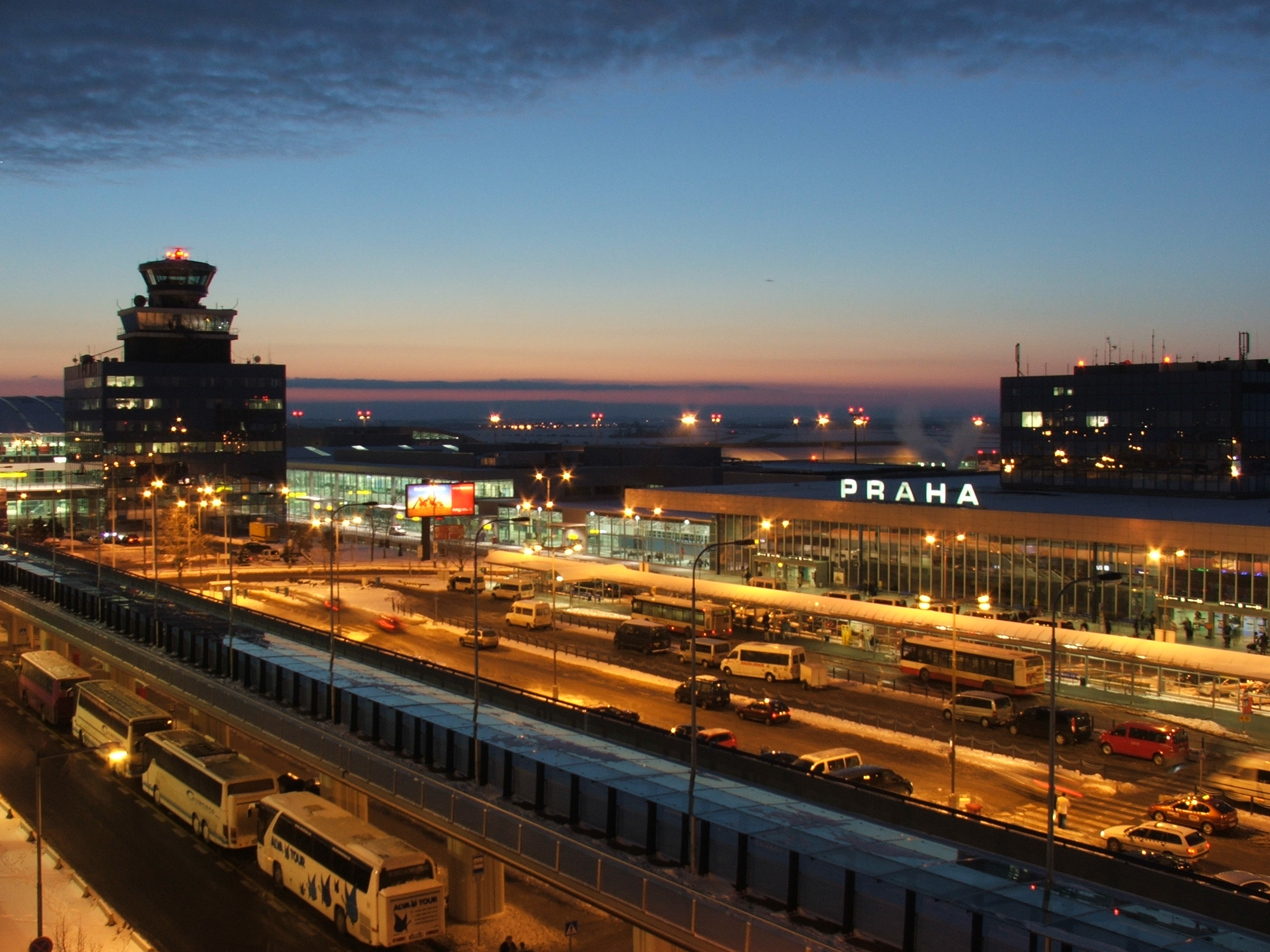
Prague Airport

Transportation in Prague

- Public transport in Prague
  - Public transport operators in Prague
- Air transport in Prague
  - Airports in Prague
    - Prague Airport
- Road transport in Prague
  - Bus transport in Prague
  - Trolleybuses in Prague

==== Rail transport in Prague ====
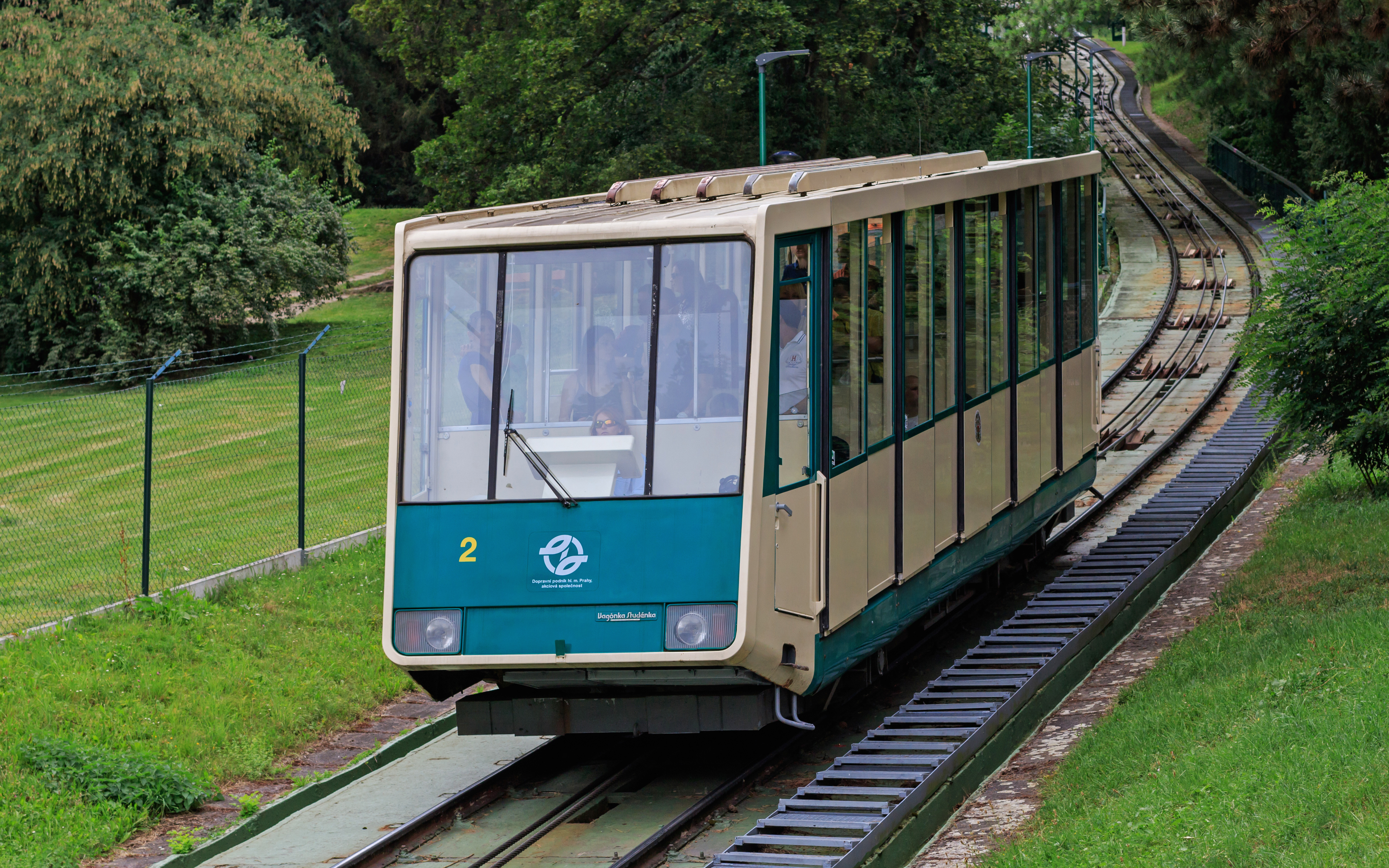
The Petřín funicular

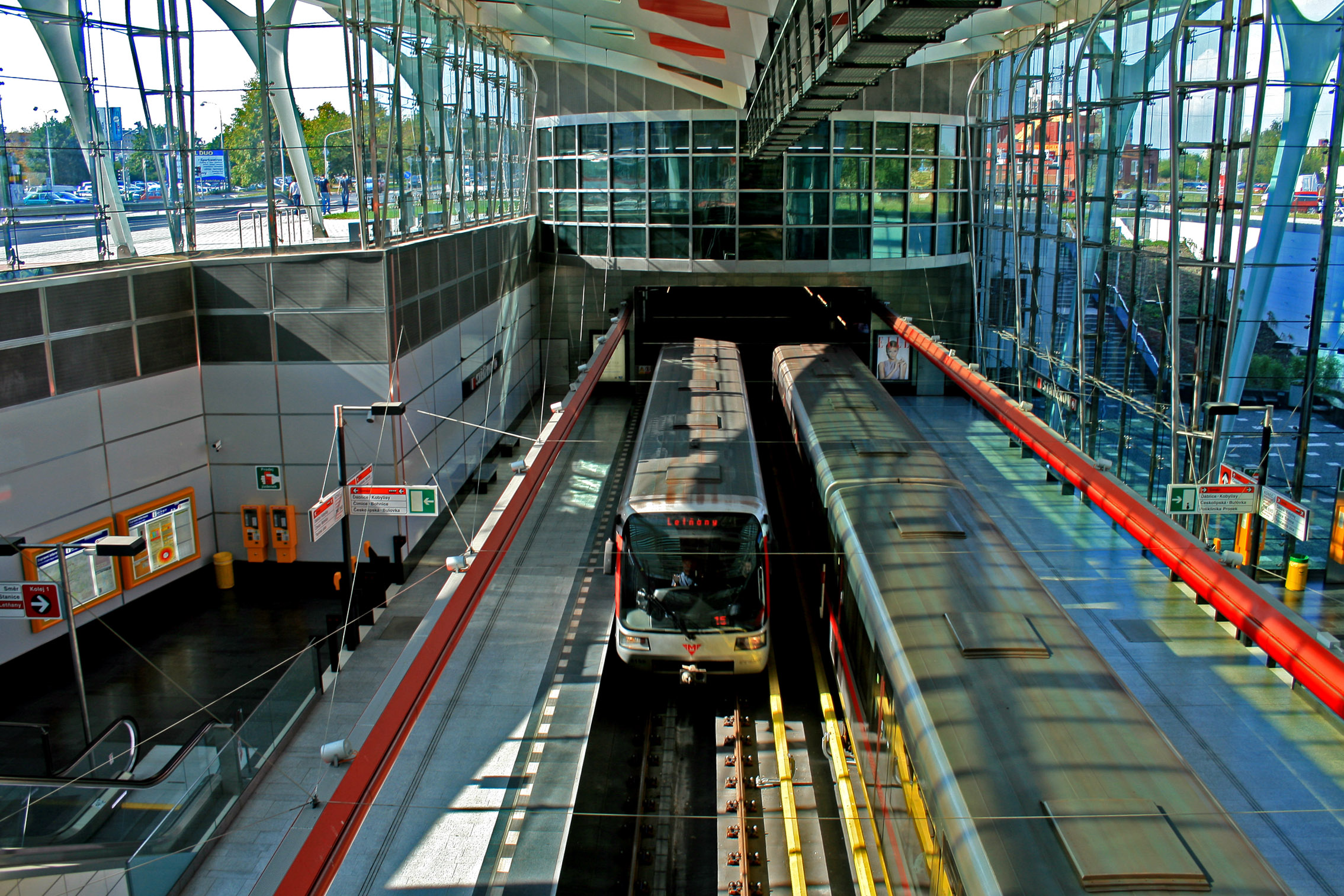
Metro M1 in Střížkov station on line C

Rail transport in Prague

- Petřín funicular
- Prague Metro
  - A Line A
  - B Line B
  - C Line C
  - D Line D (proposed line)
    - List of Prague Metro stations
- Railway stations in Prague
  - Praha hlavní nádraží
  - Praha-Holešovice railway station
  - Praha Masarykovo nádraží
  - Praha-Smíchov railway station
- Trams in Prague

== Education in Prague ==
Education in Prague

- Universities in Prague
  - Charles University
  - Czech Technical University in Prague
  - Metropolitan University Prague
  - University of Business in Prague
  - University of Economics
  - University of Finance and Administration
- Research institutes in Prague
  - Czech Academy of Sciences

== Healthcare in Prague ==
- Hospitals in Prague
  - Bulovka Hospital
  - Motol University Hospital
  - Psychiatric Clinic in Prague

== See also ==
- Outline of geography
