= List of tallest buildings in the Czech Republic =

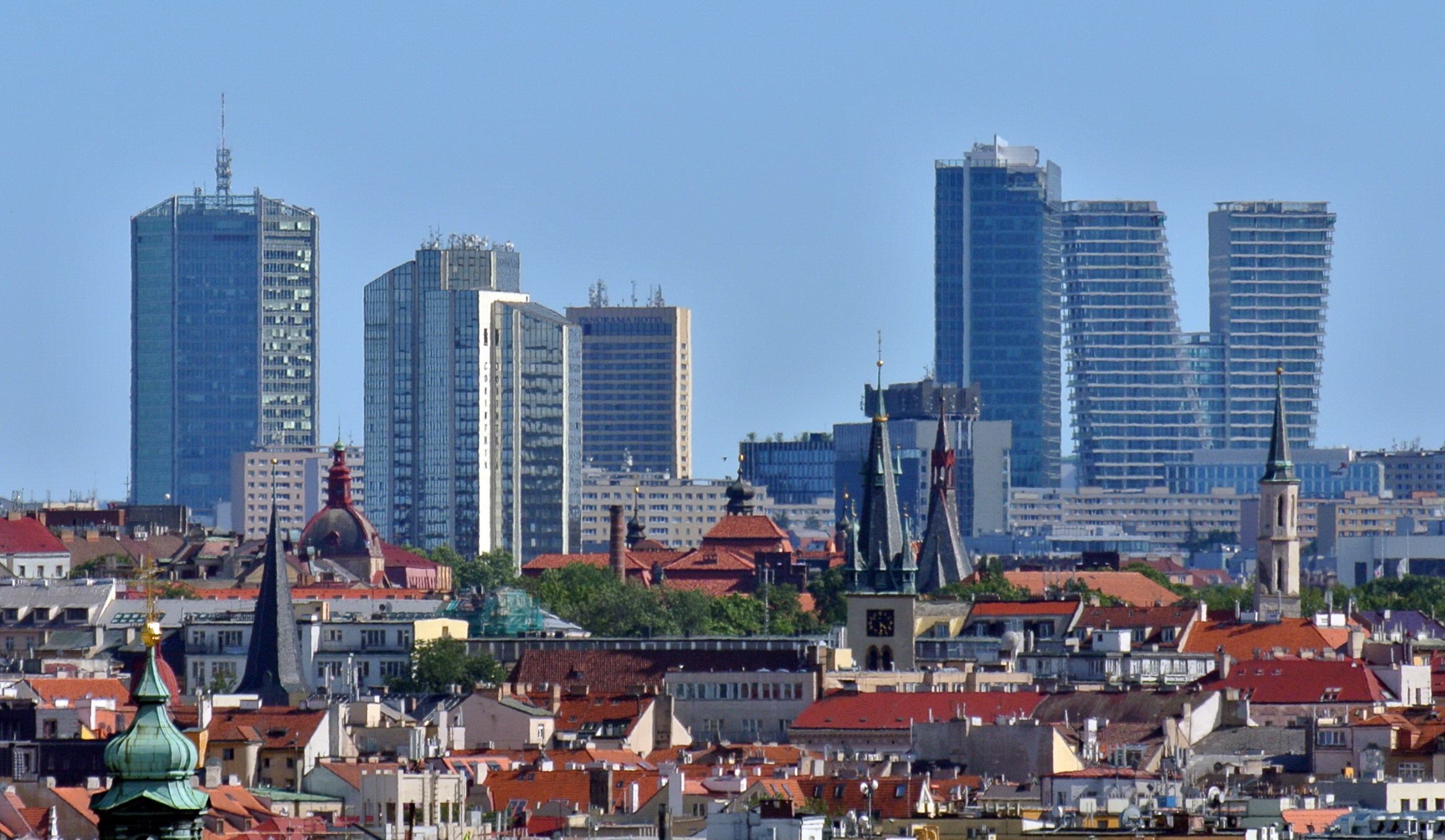
Pankrác district in Prague

This lists ranks the tallest buildings in the Czech Republic that stand at least 75 metres (246 ft) tall. For non-building structures, see List of tallest structures in the Czech Republic

== Tallest buildings ==
Was the tallest building in the Czech Republic upon completion

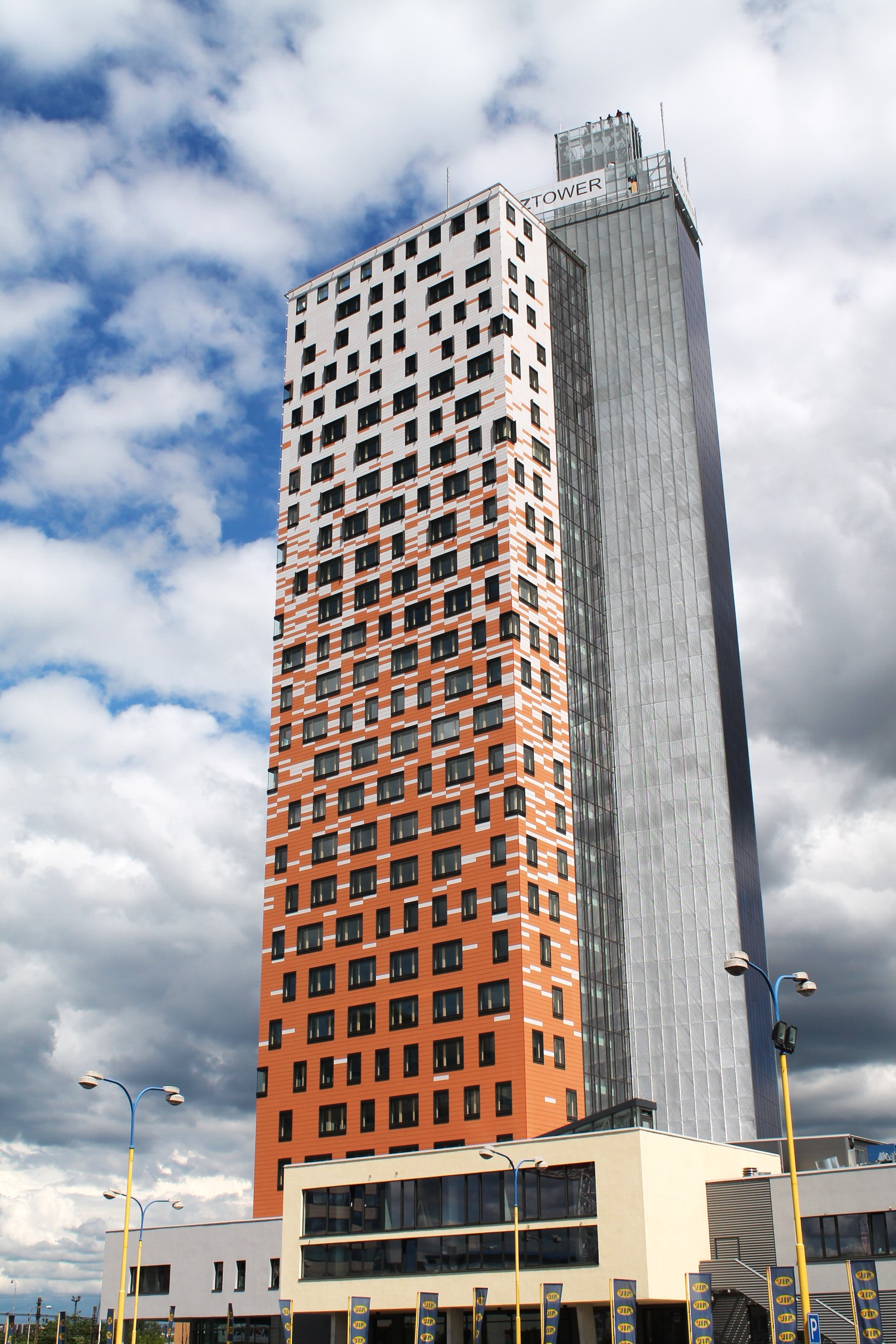
AZ Tower in Brno

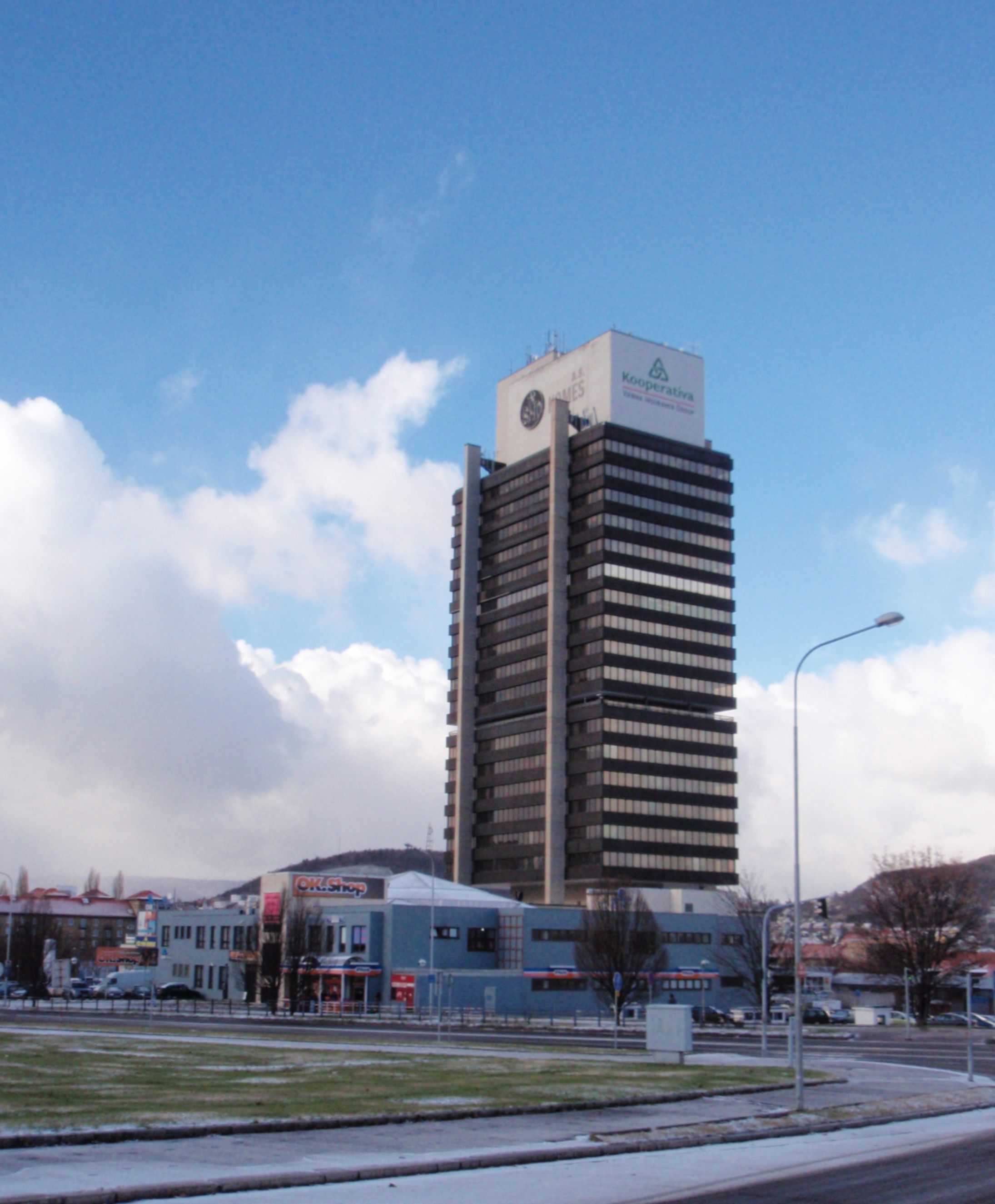
SHD Komes building in Most

Name	City	Pinnacle Height (Meters)	Floors	Year built	Use
AZ Tower	Brno	111	30	2013	mixed use
City Tower	Prague	109	27	2008	office
City Empiria	Prague	104	27	1977	office
V Tower	Prague	103.9	30	2018	residential
SaS group Tower	Most	100	23	1984	office
Rezidence Eliška	Prague	94	25	2013	residential
Corinthia Hotel Prague	Prague	90	24	1980s	hotel
Palác Vinohrady	Prague	90	18	1971	office, telecommunication
Hotel Crowne Plaza Prague	Prague	89	16	1954	hotel
Regionální Centrum Olomouc Building 2	Olomouc	85	20	2003	office
Spielberk Office Centrum	Brno	85	21	2012	office
Administrative building of Liberec Region	Liberec	84	21	1976	office
Residential building SOL	Prague	82	21	1970s	residential
Hotel Kupa	Prague	81	23	??	hotel
Lighthouse Vltava Waterfront Towers	Prague	80	19	2004	office
Baťa's Skyscraper	Zlín	80	16	1938	office
Panorama Hotel Prague	Prague	80	24	1984	hotel
BEA campus Olomouc	Olomouc	79	19	2013	education
Česká spořitelna building	Prague	76	22	??	office
A1 FSI VUT building	Brno	76	19	1984	education
Arnika	Prague	75	20	?	residential
AFI City 1	Prague	75	19	2020	office
many lower buildings

The CETIN building, with an architectural height of 85 m and a pinnacle height of 96 m, was demolished in 2023.

== Church and town towers ==
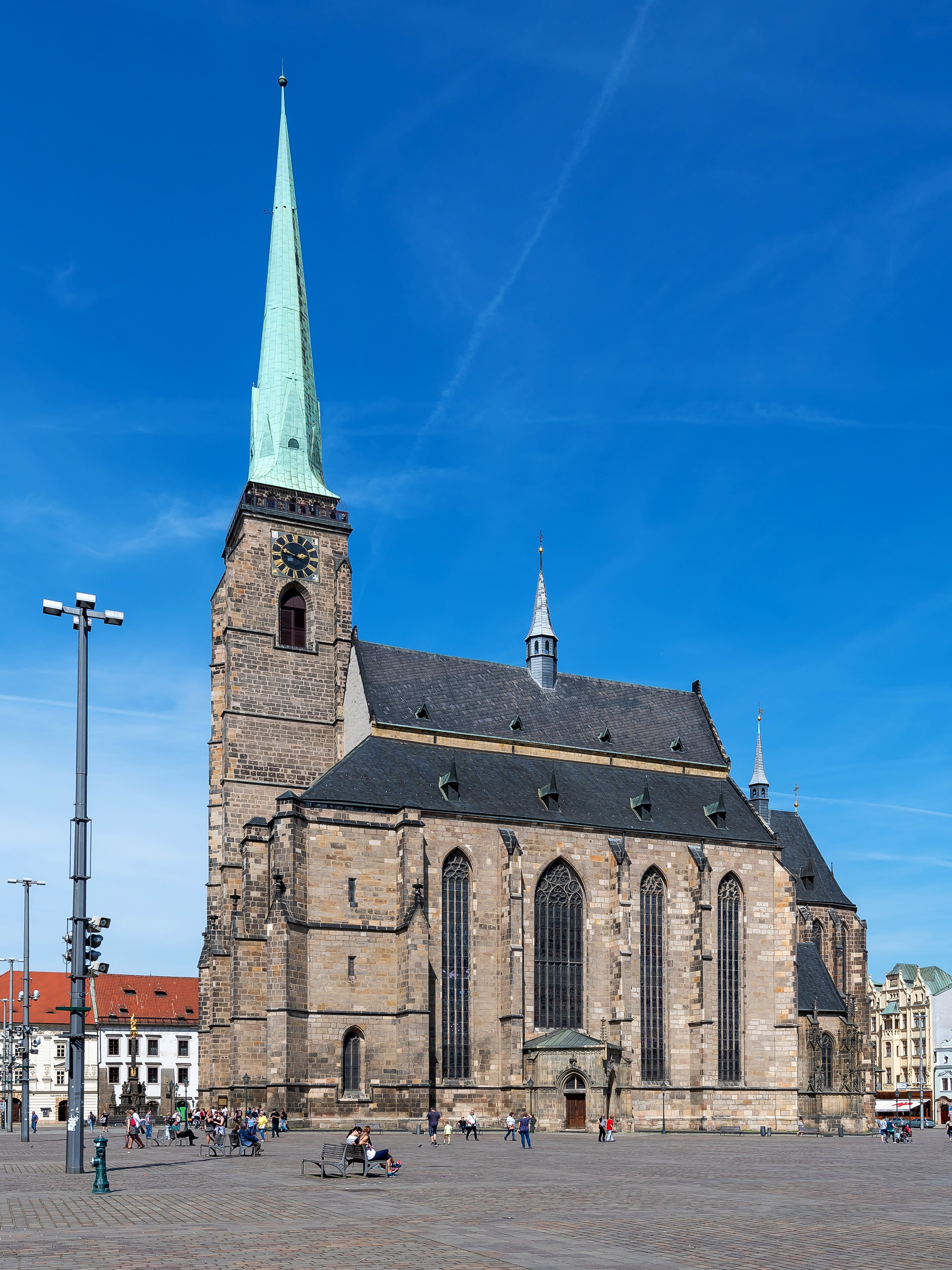
Cathedral of St. Bartholomew in Plzeň, the highest church in the Czech Republic

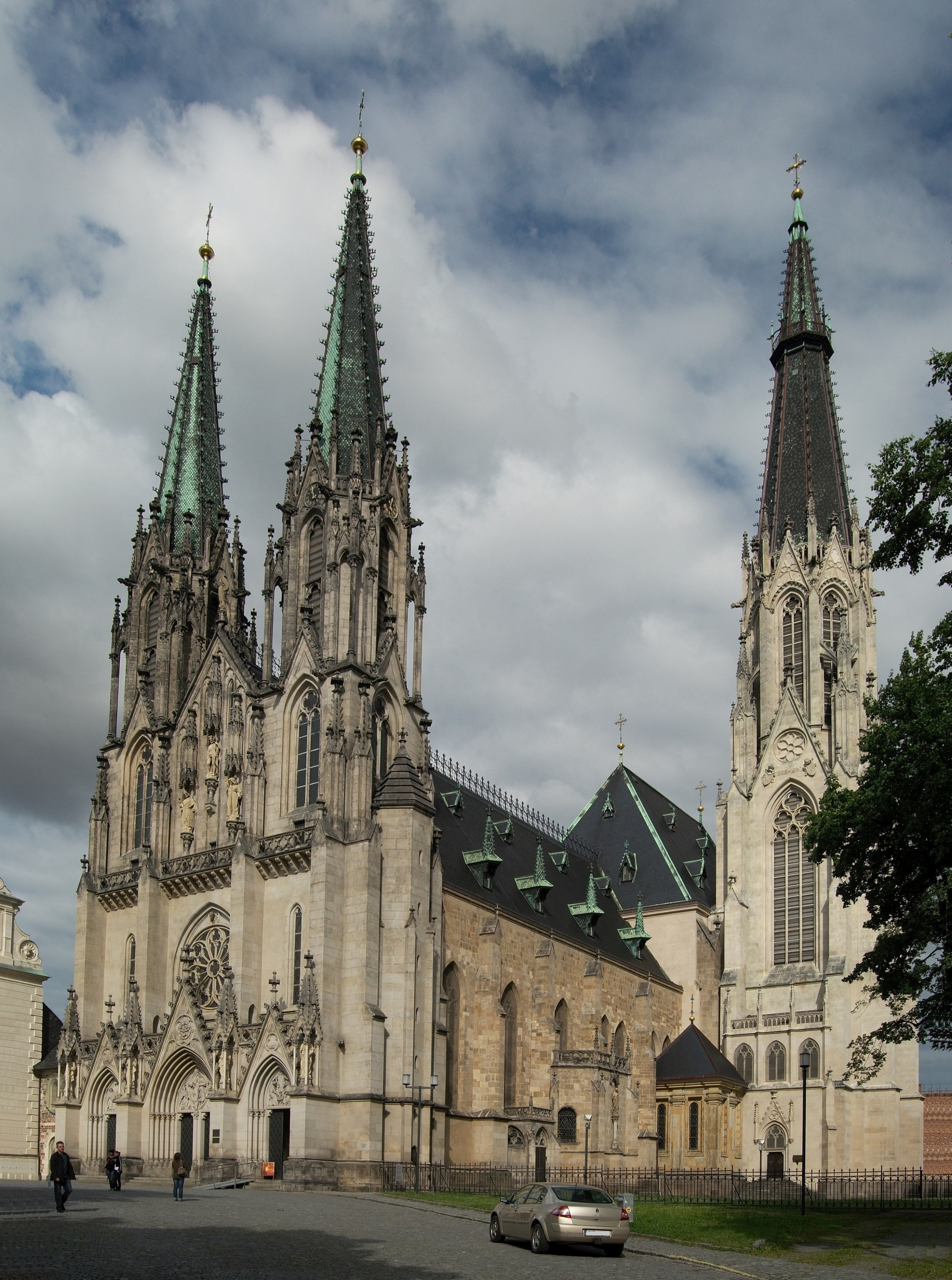
St. Wenceslas Cathedral in Olomouc

Name	City	Height	Year built	Use
Cathedral of St. Bartholomew	Plzeň	102	1837	church
Saint Wenceslas Cathedral	Olomouc	101	1883	church
St. Vitus Cathedral	Prague	97	1929	church
Tovačov Castle tower	Tovačov	96	1492	castle tower
Church of St. James	Brno	92	1592	church
Church of St. Peter and Paul	Čáslav	89	1506	church
Church of the Transfiguration	Tábor	87	1677	church
New City Hall	Ostrava	86	1930	city hall
Church of Saint James in Kutná Hora	Kutná Hora	85	1698	church
Kroměříž Castle tower	Kroměříž	84	1768	castle tower
Cathedral of St. Peter and Paul	Brno	84	1909	church
Black Tower	Klatovy	82	1872	city tower
Church of Our Lady before Týn	Prague	81	1460s	church
Church of Saint Wenceslaus	Prague	80	1930	church
Znojmo Town Hall Tower	Znojmo	80	1448	city tower
St. Nicholas Church	Prague	79	1750s	church
Church of St. Cyril and Methodius	Prague	78	1860s	church
Church of the Transfiguration	Tábor	78	1677	church
City Tower	Třebíč	75	1458	city tower
Town hall in Olomouc	Olomouc	75	1607	town hall
Church of Saint Nicholas	Ludgeřovice	75	1907	church

== Approved and proposed buildings ==
Name	City	Height (m)	Floors	Year	Status
Ostrava Tower	Ostrava	235	56	2027	Proposed
Prague Eye Towers - Tower A	Prague	153	32	–	Proposed
Prague Eye Towers - Tower B	Prague	142	29	–	Proposed
Top Tower	Prague	135	32	2028	Approved
Porto Háje	Prague	120	31	–	Proposed

== See also ==
- List of tallest structures in the Czech Republic
- List of tallest buildings in Prague
