= List of tallest buildings in Prague =

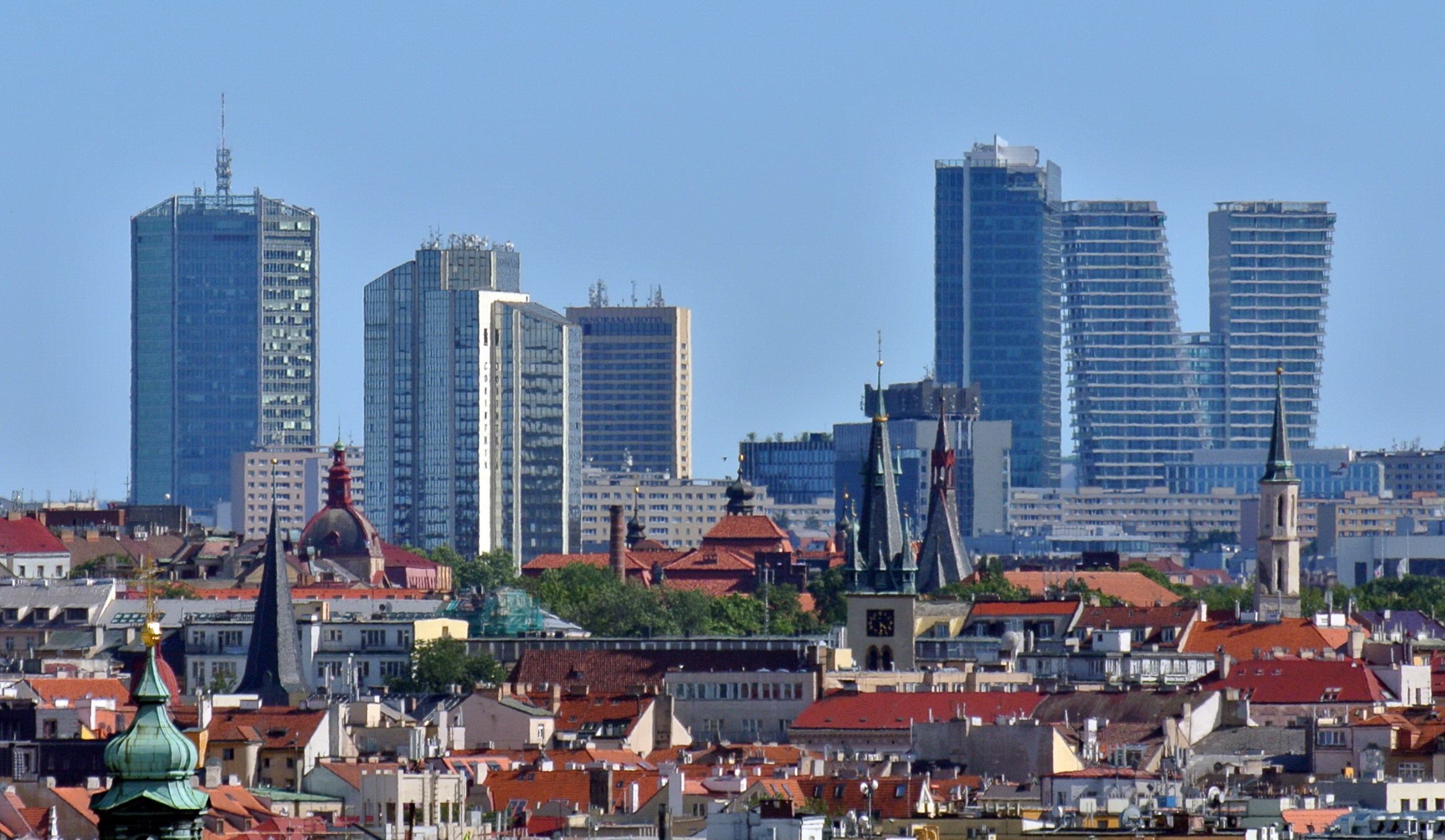
Pankrác district, where the three tallest buildings are located in (City Empiria, City Tower and V Tower)

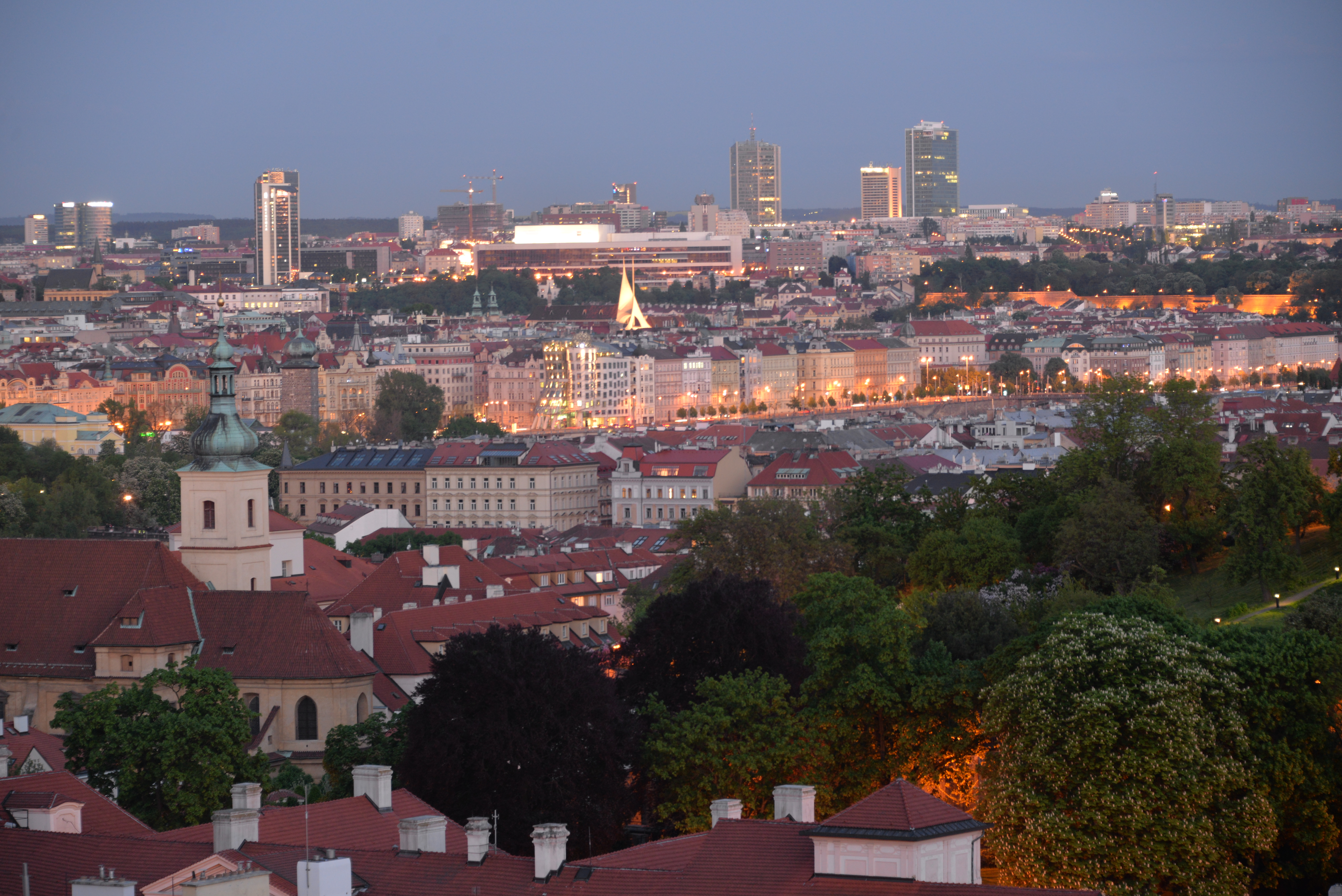
Prague's skyline towards Pankrác

This list ranks the tallest buildings in Prague that stand at least 80 metres (262 ft) tall. For non-building structures, see article List of tallest structures in Prague.

== Tallest buildings ==
Tallest buildings in Prague as of March 2019.

| Name | Roof Height m (ft) | Floors | Year | Notes |
|---|---|---|---|---|
| City Tower | 109 (385) | 30 | 2008 | |
| City Empiria | 104 (341) | 27 | 1977 | |
| V Tower | 104 (341) | 30 | 2018 | |
| CETIN building | 96 (315) | 18 | 1979 | |
| Rezidence Eliška | 94 (308) | 25 | 2013 | |
| Corinthia Hotel Prague | 90 (295) | 24 | 1988 | |
| Palác Vinohrady | 90 (295) | 18 | 1971 | |
| Hotel International Prague | 89 (292) | 16 | 1954 | |
| SOL building | 82 (269) | 21 | 1970s | |
| Ubytovna Kupa | 81 (266) | 23 | 1980 | |
| Lighthouse Vltava Waterfront Towers | 80 (262) | 19 | 2004 | |

== See also ==
- List of tallest structures in Prague
- List of tallest buildings in the Czech Republic
