= List of tallest structures in Prague =

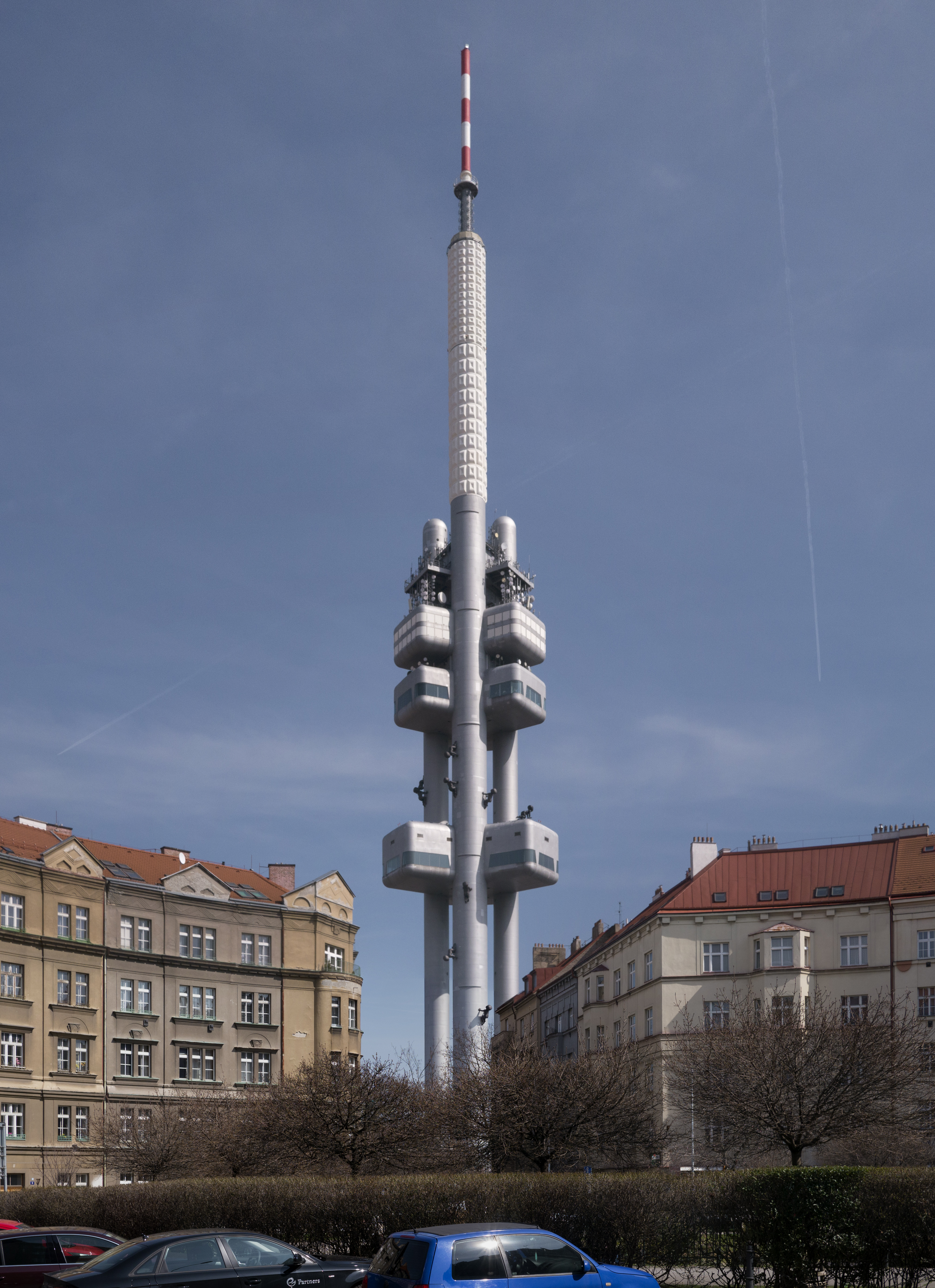
Žižkov Television Tower, tallest structure in Prague

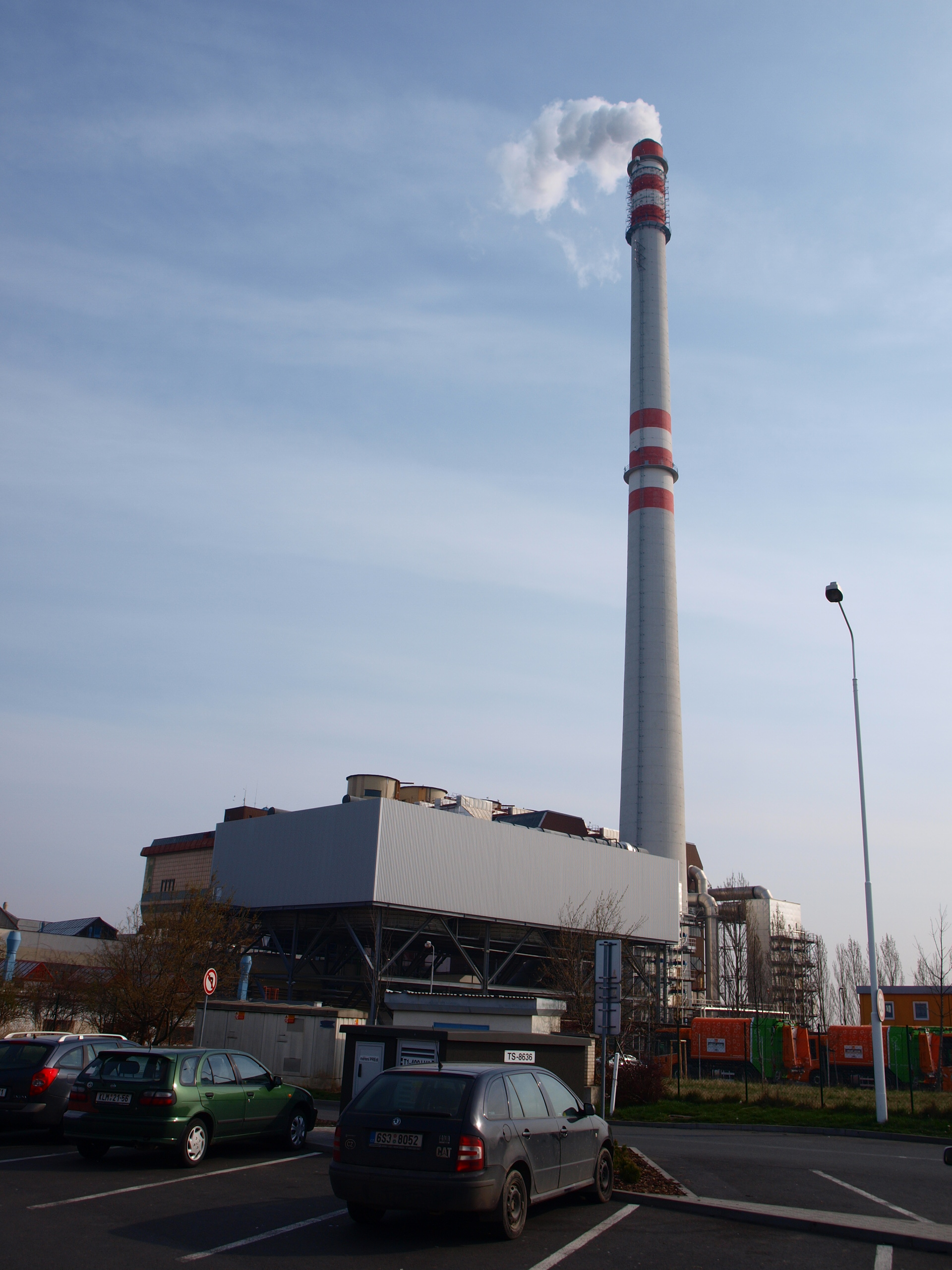
Chimney of Malešice Incineration Plant, tallest chimney in Prague

This lists ranks the tallest structures in Prague that stand at least 96.5 metres (317 ft) tall. The list contains all types of structures.

Name	Pinnacle height	Year	Structure type	Coordinates
Žižkov Television Tower	216 m	1992	Freestanding tower	50°4′51″N 14°27′4″E
Chimney of Malešice Incineration Plant	180 m	1996	Chimney	50°4′44″N 14°32′28″E
Chimney of Malešice Heating Power Plant	160 m	1961	Chimney	50°5′5″N 14°31′27″E
Chimney of Třeboradice Heating Power Plant	150 m	?	Chimney	50°9′53″N 14°30′52″E
Chimney of Michle Heating Plant	140 m	?	Chimney	50°3′15″N 14°28′8″E
Chimney of Michle Heating Plant	120 m	?	Chimney	50°3′15″N 14°28′11″E
Chimney of Motorlet Jinonice	115 m	1984	Chimney	50°3′20″N 14°22′46″E
Chimney of Průmstav	110 m	?	Chimney	50°2′40″N 14°34′26″E
Chimney of Státní statek Radotín	110 m	?	Chimney	49°59′24″N 14°22′35″E
City Tower	109 m	2008	Skyscraper	50°3′1″N 14°26′10″E
City Empiria	104 m	1977	Skyscraper	50°3′0″N 14°26′22″E
V Tower	103.9 m	2017	Skyscraper	50°2′57″N 14°26′11″E
Chimney of Holešovice Heating Power Plant	100 m	?	Chimney	50°6′36″N 14°26′10″E
Main tower of St. Vitus Cathedral	96.5 m	1929	Church tower	50°5′27″N 14°24′2″E

== See also ==
- List of tallest buildings in Prague
- List of tallest buildings in the Czech Republic
