= Pankrác (disambiguation) =

Pankrác is a neighborhood of Prague, Czech Republic

Pankrác may also refer to:

- Czech spelling of the name Pancras
- Pankrác (Prague Metro)
- Pankrác Prison
- Pankrác Plain, Pankrác Terrace, a geomorphological and urban area in Prague
