= Pankrác Plain =

Geomorphological and urban area in Prague

Coordinates: 50°3′0″N 14°26′11″E

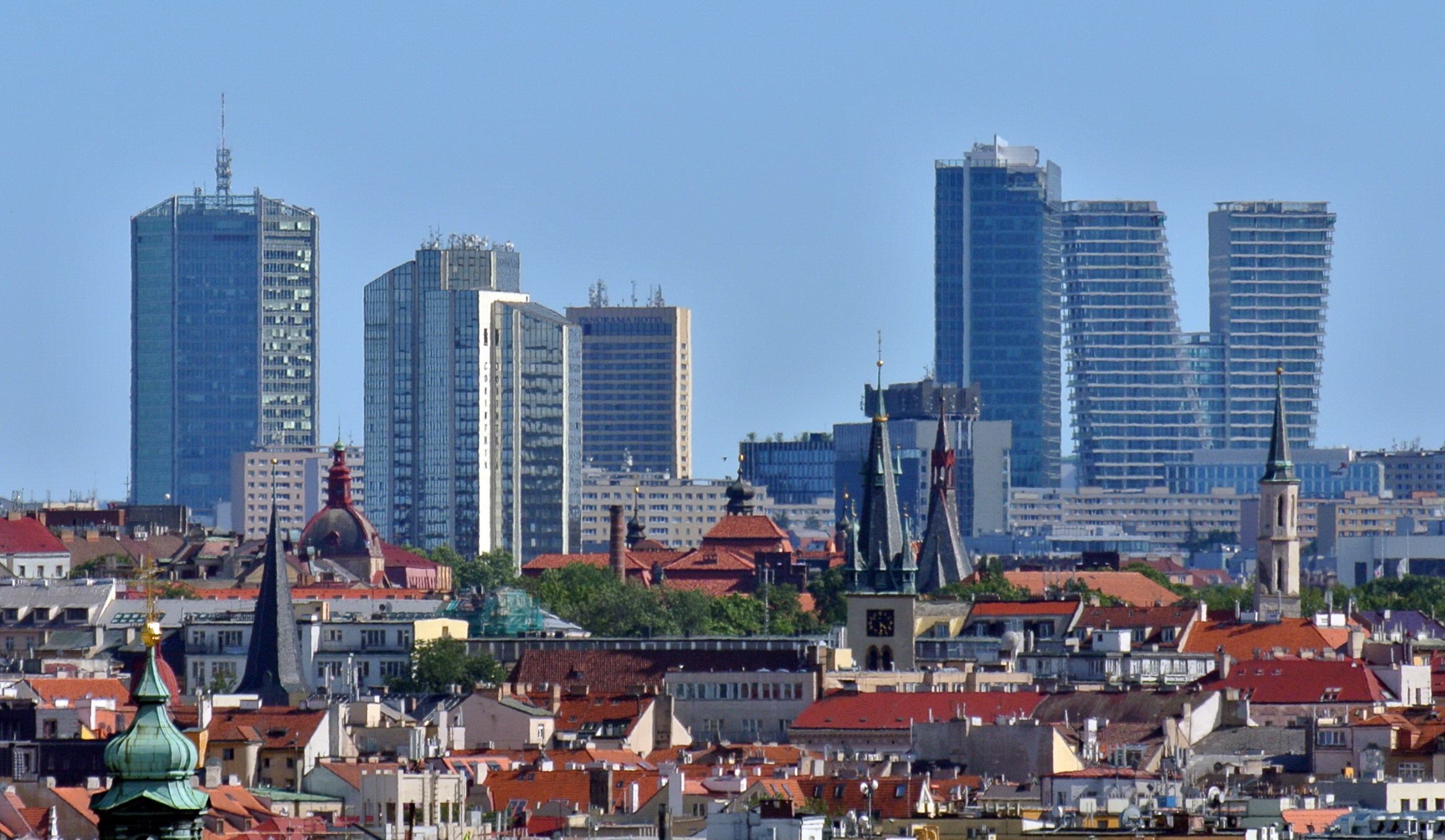
Pankrác skyline

The Pankrác Plain or Pankrác Terrace (Czech: Pankrácká pláň, Pankrácká terasa) is a geomorphological and urban area in Prague associated with the Pankrác district. The name of the district refers to the church of St. Pancras in the area. It stands about 1.5 km from the World Heritage Site "Historic Centre of Prague", the southern horizon of the Prague panorama. The second half of the 2000s witnessed a controversy related to the construction of new skyscrapers in the area.

== High rise buildings at Pankrác Plain ==
The whole panorama of the top of Pankrác hill is usually taken into account when assessing the Prague panorama. As of 2023 the following buildings enter the long-distance view:

Construction	Completion	Current name	Original name	Notes	Height (m)
1972	1978	Centrotex Building		at the metro station Pražského povstání	74
1975	1977	City Empiria	Motokov	in the pentagon (Note: "Pentagon" is an informal name for the area enclosed by the streets Hvězdova, Na Pankráci, Na Strži, Milevská, Pujmanové.)	104
1976	1981	Prague Congress Centre	Palác kultury	near Nusle Bridge	39
1979	1983	Panorama Hotel Prague	Hotel Panorama	in the pentagon	79
1984	1988	Corinthia Hotel Prague	Hotel Fórum	near Nusle Bridge	84
1983	2008	City Tower	Československý rozhlas	in the pentagon	109
2008	2010	Residence Kavčí hory		near Kavčí hory	41
2015	2018	V Tower		in the pentagon	104
