= Rezidence Eliška =

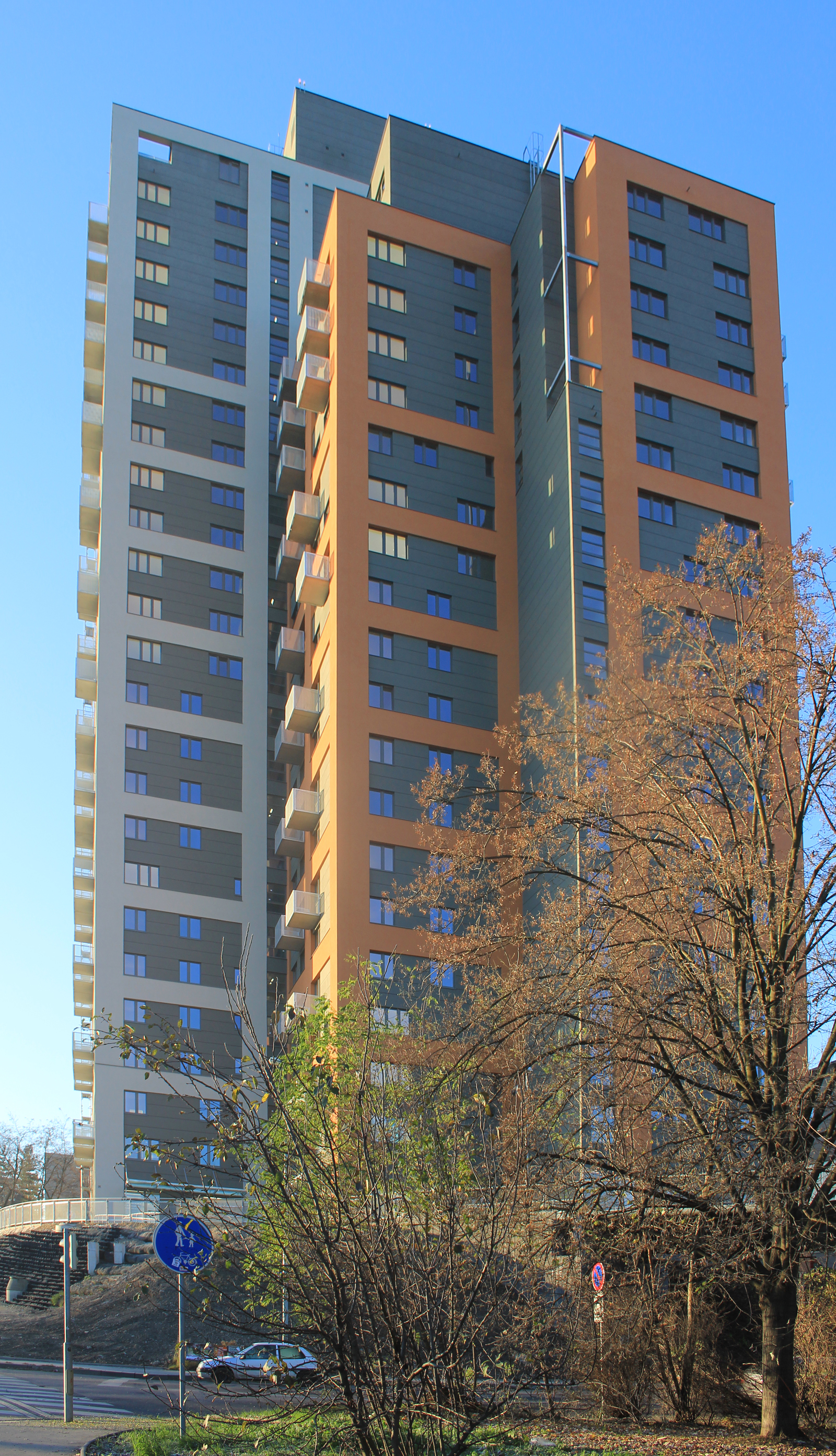
- Interactive map of the Rezidence Eliška area

General information
- Location: Freyova 983/25, Prague 9, Vysočany, 190 00, Prague, Czech Republic
- Coordinates: 50.105917°N 14.502422°E
- Groundbreaking: 2011
- Completed: 2013
- Cost: 500 million CZK

Height
- Roof: 93.6 m (307 ft)

Technical details
- Floor count: 27

Design and construction
- Architect: Ivan Sládek
- Architecture firm: ARX studio

Rezidence Eliška is a high-rise residential building in Prague-Vysočany. It is 93.6 metres (307 ft) tall.

Construction started in 2011, ending in 2013. The building has 27 above-ground floors, 25 of which are residential, and 5 underground, containing 355 units. Designed by Czech architect Ivan Sládek, the final cost of the building was estimated at 500 million CZK.

The building was the tallest residential building in Prague from its completion in 2013 until 2018, when it was superseded by the V Tower, which is 104 m (341 ft) high.

== See also ==
- List of tallest buildings in Prague
- List of tallest buildings in the Czech Republic
