= Czech Inn Hotels =

Czech hotel group

Czech Inn Hotels s.r.o.
- Industry: Hotel
- Founded: 2003
- Founder: Jaroslav Svoboda
- Headquarters: Prague, Czech Republic
- Owner: Jaroslav Svoboda
- Website: https://www.czechinn.cz/

Czech Inn Hotels s.r.o. is a Czech company which operates a group of more than 30 hotels and 32 catering facilities. It is one of the largest management companies in the Czech Republic focused on the hotel industry. The company was founded in 2003 by Jaroslav Svoboda. Most of these establishments are four-star hotels and are an integral part of the Czech Inn Holding group. Since its inception, the company has maintained cooperation with Mornington Capital, a British investment company based in London.

In 2020, the company opened its first hotel designed to accommodate people affected by the COVID-19 virus. Hotel visitors were served remotely, including check-in/check-out.

In October 2022, the American news outlet CNBC updated its "Best Hotels for Business Travelers" ranking, and two hotels from the Czech Inn Hotels network – Don Giovanni Hotel Prague and The Grand Mark Hotel Prague – made it into the Czech top five.

In 2022, the company accommodated more than 1.2 million guests. In 2023, Czech Inn Hotels accommodated more than 1.5 million guests, and in 2024, more than 2 million.

In 2023, a hotel in Georgia on the Black Sea coast was added to the network. In August 2025, the company purchased the Achat Hotel in Budapest, its first foreign acquisition in the Visegrad Four. In 2026, the company purchased the Grand Palace Hotel in Riga.In August 2026, the company entered the Austrian market by purchasing the Hilton hotel in Vienna.

In 2025, Czech Inn Hotels was included in the prestigious Czech Elite TOP 100 ranking of the most valuable Czech companies.

== Hotels and restaurants ==
The company operates three to five star hotels and restaurants across Prague. Some of the hotels are also in Brno, the second largest city of the Czech Republic.

=== Hotels (selection) ===
- The Grand Mark (Prague)
- Grand Hotel Prague Towers (Prague)
- Grand Hotel International (Prague)
- Don Giovanni (Prague)
- Wellness Hotel Step (Prague)
- Grand Palace Brno (Brno)
- Iris Hotel Eden (Prague)
- Cosmopolitan Bobycentrum (Brno)
- Plaza Prague (Prague)
- Josephine Old Town (Prague)
- Wellness Hotel Extol Inn (Prague)
- Wenceslas Square (Prague)
- Metropolitan Old Town (Prague)
- Victoria (Prague)
- Adler (Prague)
- UNO Prague (Prague)
- Charles Central (Prague)
- Miramare – Magnetic Beach Hotel (Georgia)
- Czech Inn hotel Ferenc (Hungary)
- Grand Palace Riga (Latvia)
- Grand Hotel Palace Schonbrunn (Austria)

=== Restaurants (selection) ===
- Le Grill Bistrot Puglia (Prague)
- Allegretto (Prague)
- Bistrot Valentino (Prague)
