= ECM Real Estate Investments =

Real estate developer

- Founded: 1998
- Headquarters: Luxembourg City, Luxembourg

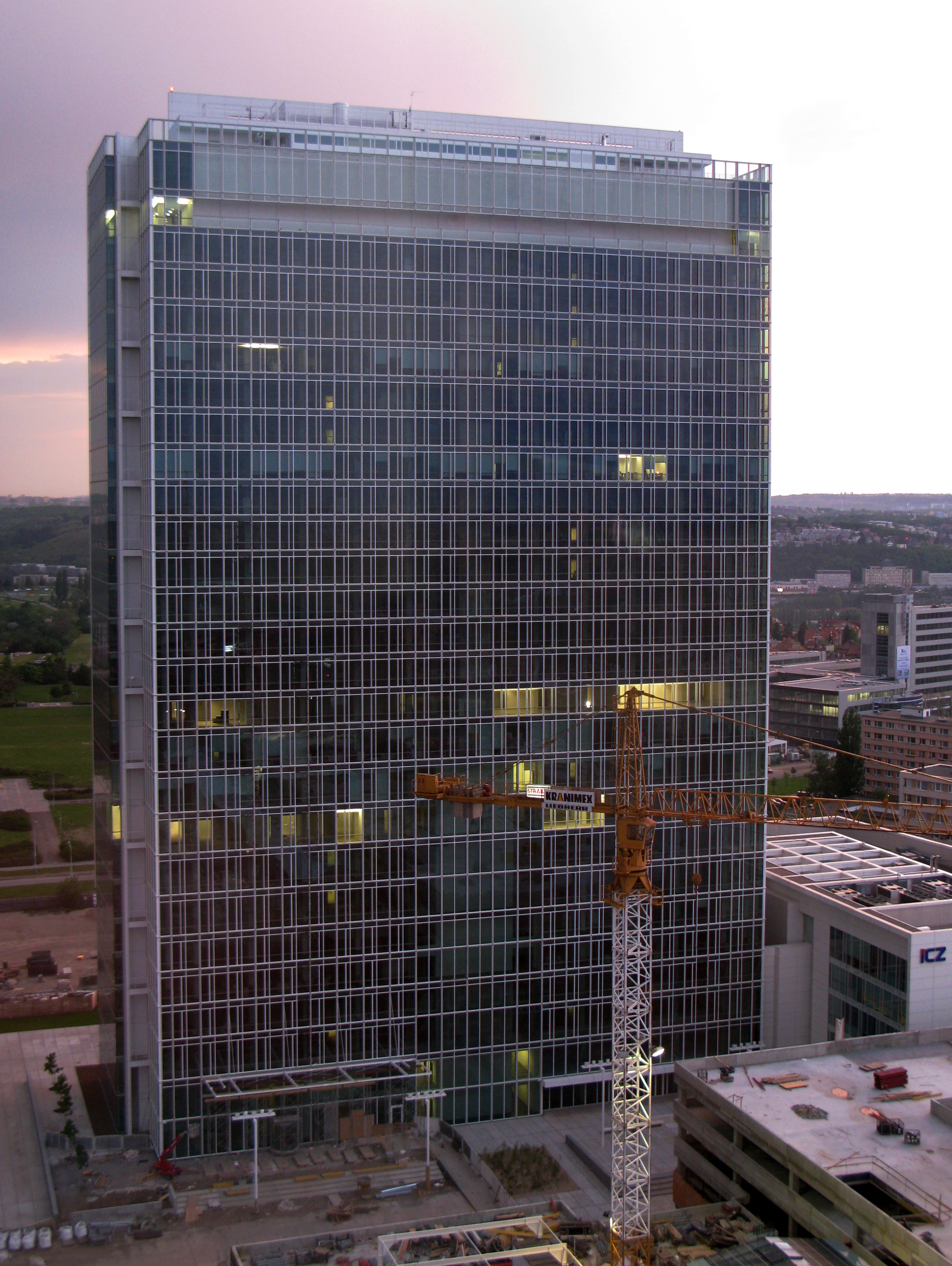
City Tower, tallest building in Prague. ECM bought it unfinished in 1999 and sold it in 2009.

ECM Real Estate Investments A.G. is bankrupted real estate developer based in Luxembourg, that was active mostly in Czech Republic, but also in China, Poland or Russia.

Company was founded in 1991 by Michal Janků, he is now still its CEO and through ECM Group N.V. largest shareholder (77%) of the company. Company owned inter alia two tallest buildings in the Czech Republic - City Tower and City Empiria. In 2006 company went on IPO on Prague Stock Exchange with price per stock 1,318 CZK (47 EUR), getting market capitalization 262.7 mil. EUR Stocks became part of PX Index and eventually reached price 2,000 CZK per share.

Mainly as result of the Great Recession, the company went bankrupt in May 2011 and went into liquidation in July 2011. In 2012 liquidation was changed to reorganization, but reverted to liquidation in February 2013.

Before its bankruptcy, ECM was involved in the development of V Tower in Prague.

== Financial data ==
Financial Data in Euro Thousands
Year-end	2005	2006	2007	2008	2009	2010	2011
Total revenue	2,136	8,315	19,339	35,793	36,851	27,039	12,046
Net income	20,710	18,955	25,564	-92,107	-60,820	-95,598	-63,848
Total assets	65,000	228,407	562,966	677,924	341,690	156,209	105,964
