= CETIN building =

Building in Prague, Czech Republic

- Ústřední telekomunikační budova (ÚTB)
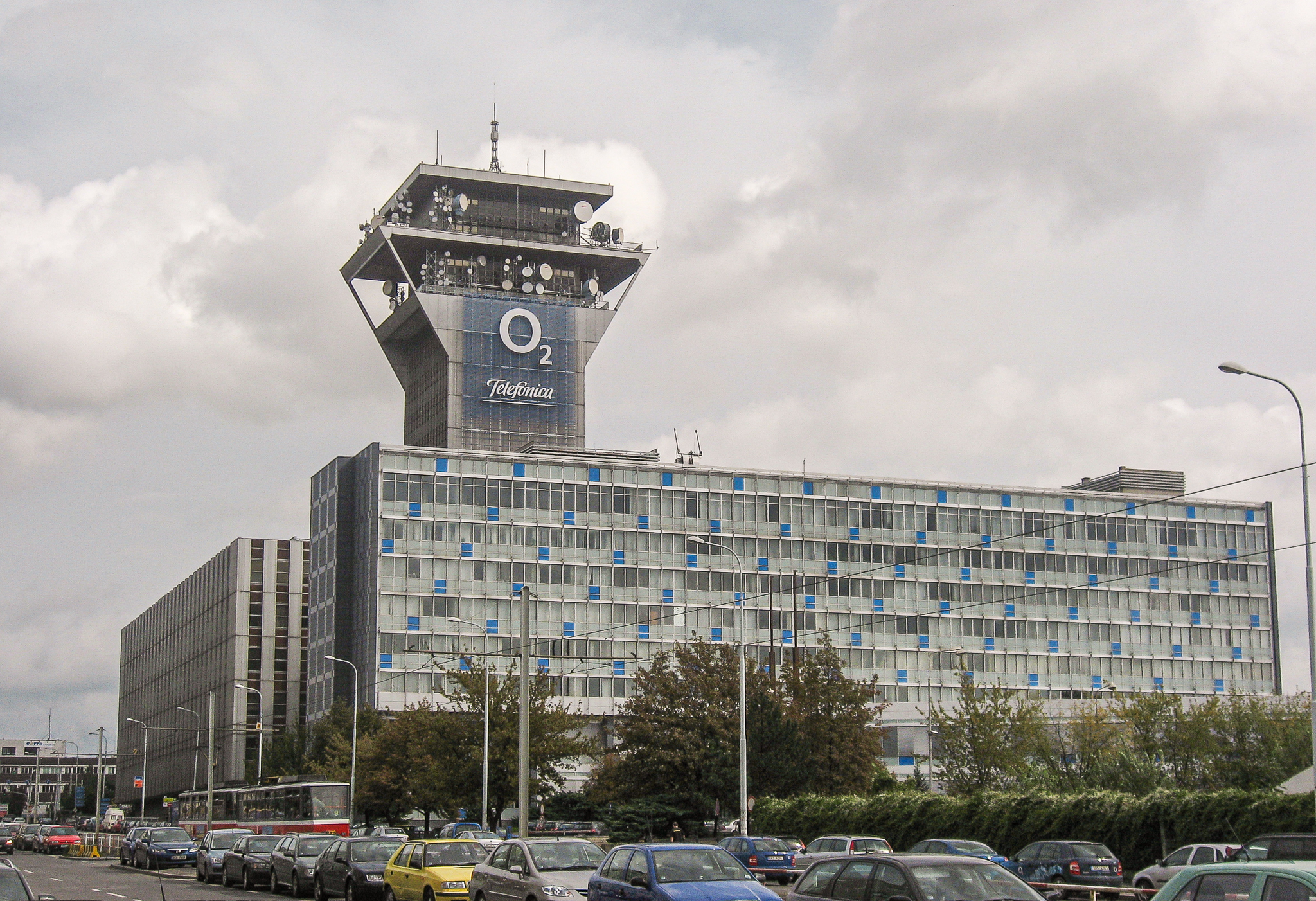
- Interactive map of the CETIN building area

General information
- Location: Prague 3, Olšanská 2681/6, Czech Republic
- Coordinates: 50°5′0.88″N 14°28′8.19″E
- Completed: 1979

The CETIN building was a building complex in Žižkov, Prague 3 district near Olšany Cemetery. Built in 1979 as the Central Telecommunications Building (Czech: Ústřední telekomunikační budova), it became the headquarters of major operators such as SPT Telecom and O2 Czech Republic after the Velvet Revolution and formation of the Czech Republic. In 2017, the complex was bought by Czech developer Central Group, and until 2022, it served as headquarters of the CETIN telecommunications company. The main tower had a roof height of 85 meters and stood a total of 96 meters with its antenna. Demolition of the building started in 2023.

== See also ==
- List of tallest buildings in the Czech Republic
