= SaS group Tower =

Coordinates: 50°30′22″N 13°38′34″E

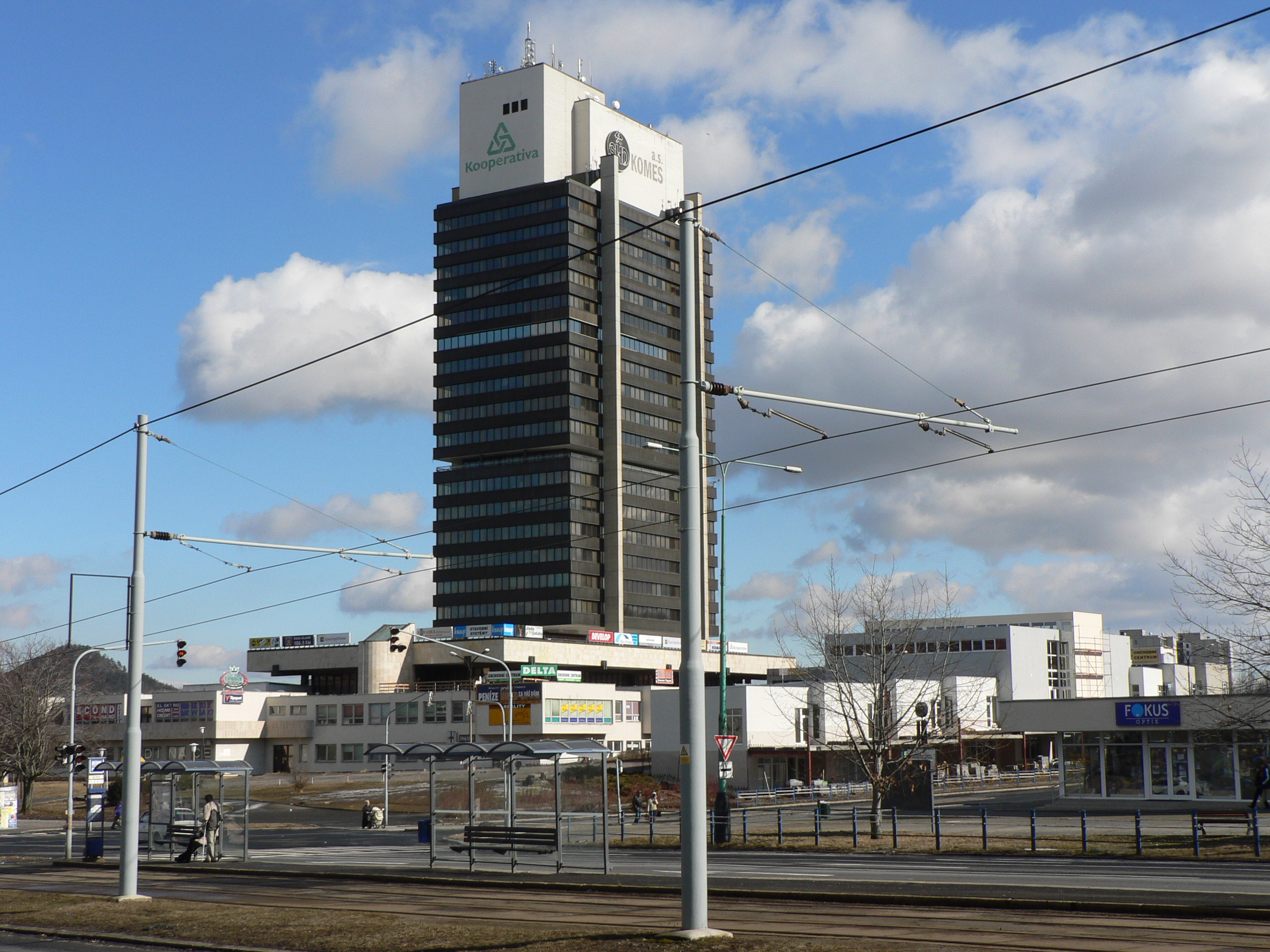
- Interactive map of the SaS group Tower area

General information
- Status: Completed
- Location: Most, Czech Republic
- Construction started: 1977
- Completed: 1984
- Opening: 1984
- Owner: SaS Energo s.r.o.

Height
- Roof: 100 m (330 ft)
- Top floor: 96 m (315 ft)

Technical details
- Floor count: 25

Design and construction
- Architects: Václav Krejčí, Jiří Fojt, Míťa Hejduk

SaS group Tower (formerly SHD Komes) is a high-rise in Most, Czech Republic. With a height of 96 metres it is the tallest building in Ústí nad Labem Region and the fifth tallest building in the Czech Republic. Construction of the building commenced in 1977, and finished in 1984. The building was used as the headquarters of Severočeské hnědouhelné doly. This company was one of the largest producers of lignite in Czechoslovakia. After 1989, SD-Comes a.s. became the new owner of the building. In 2012, the owner SD - KOMES a.s. sold the building for CZK 73.5 million to SaS ENERGO s.r.o.
