= Znojmo Town Hall Tower =

Coordinates: 48°51′19.75″N 16°2′55.71″E

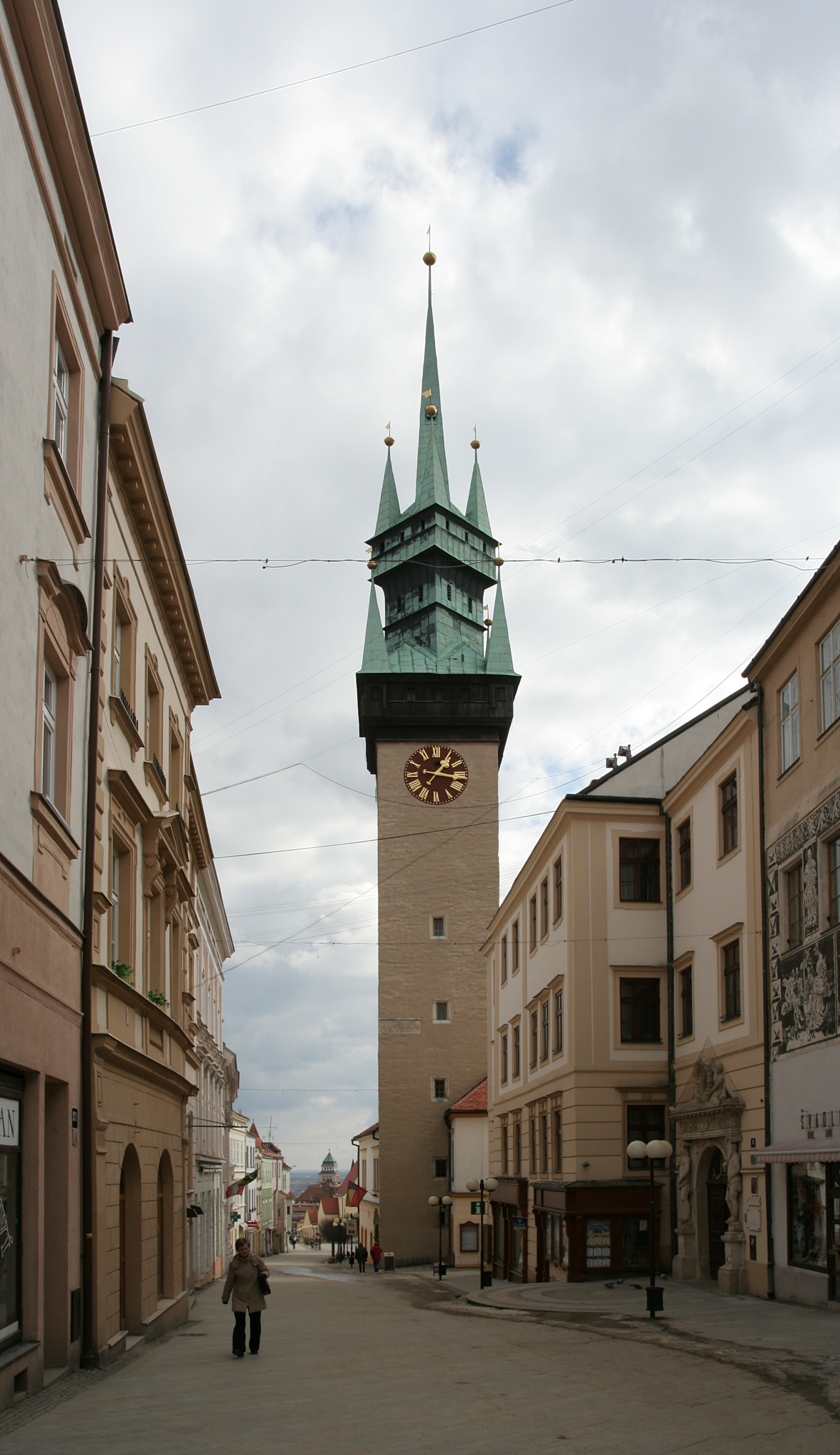
Znojmo Town Hall Tower

The Znojmo town hall tower (Czech: Znojemská radniční věž) is a Gothic tower situated in the city of Znojmo, a historic city in Moravia, Czech Republic.

The tower was contracted by Znojmo counselors in 1445 and was built by a local stonemason Nicholas of Edelspitz (Sedlešovice) in 1445–1448. The unique slim tower has a complex, elegant roof construction containing two galleries with characteristic Gothic spires.

From the top of the galleries in the tower both the inside and outside of the city could be viewed, giving much needed warning of an advancing enemy.

In a Soviet air raid during the Second World War, the tower was hit by a falling bomb. The bomb slithered off the roof of the tower, destroying the old town hall below. The destroyed building was later developed in the Communist era into a controversial concrete department store.
