= City Tower (Prague) =

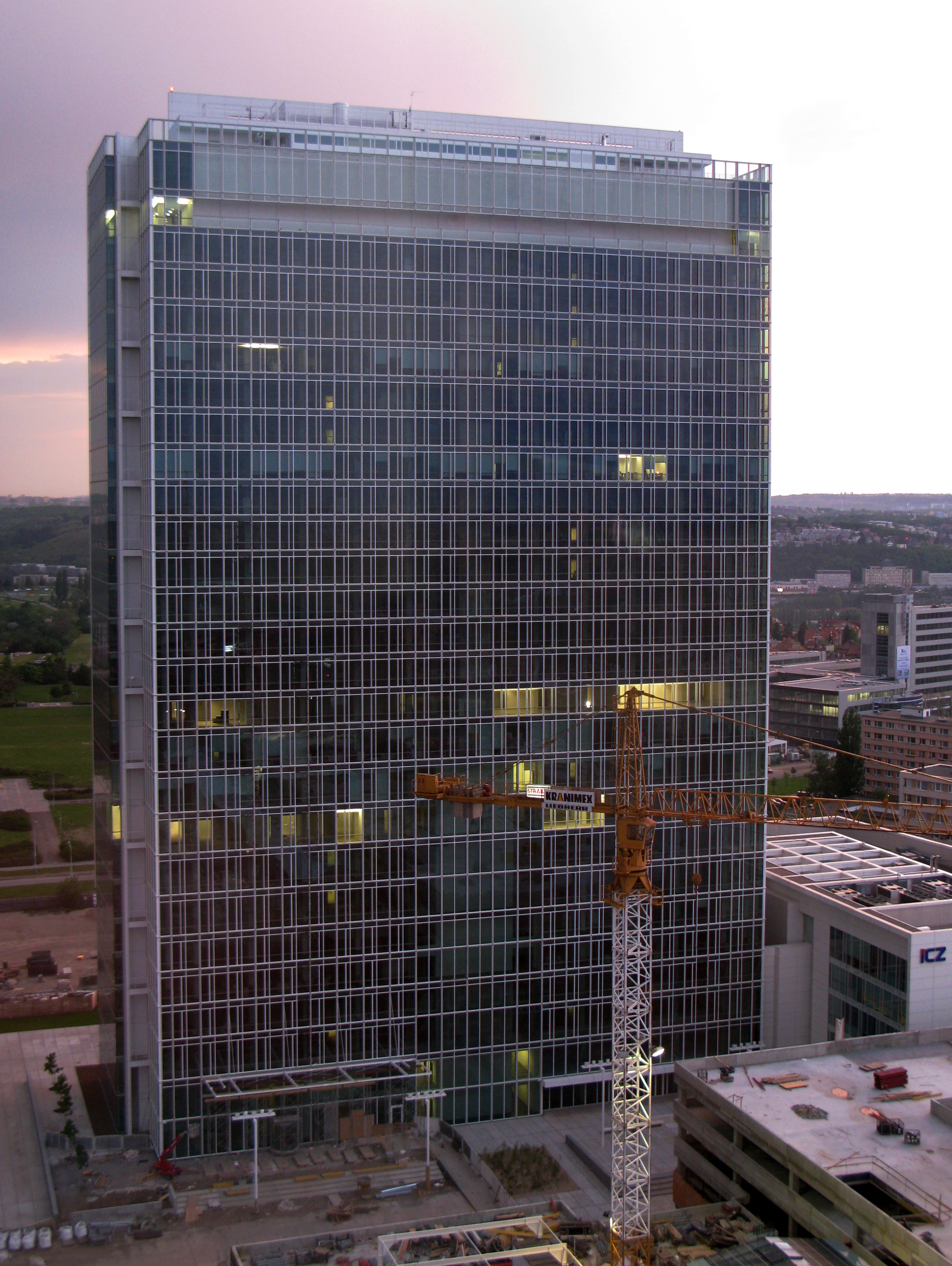
- City Tower in 2008, shortly before completion
- Interactive map of the City Tower area

General information
- Status: Completed
- Type: office, shops
- Location: Hvězdova 1716/2b, Prague, Czech Republic
- Coordinates: 50°03′01″N 14°26′10″E
- Construction started: 1985 (halted in 1993, then restarted in 2005)
- Completed: 2008
- Opened: 2008
- Owner: CITY TOWER, s.r.o.

Height
- Antenna spire: 116 m (381 ft)
- Roof: 109 m (358 ft)
- Top floor: 109 m (358 ft)

Technical details
- Floor count: 27
- Floor area: 42,000 m^{2} (450,000 sq ft) usable
- Lifts/elevators: 18

Design and construction
- Architect: Richard Meier & Partners, Architects LLP
- Developer: ECM

City Tower is the tallest skyscraper in Prague (Pankrác district) and in Bohemia, and the second tallest one in the Czech Republic standing on the Pankrác Plain with a height of 109 meters.

== History ==
Construction commenced in 1985 and the building was designated as the headquarters of Československý rozhlas (now Český rozhlas; a Czech public radio broadcaster). In 1993, the building was nearly completed, but appeared to be oversized for Český rozhlas (which split from Československý rozhlas after the Dissolution of Czechoslovakia), technically obsolete and full of dangerous asbestos.

In later years Český rozhlas tried to sell the uncompleted building. In 1996, an agreement was signed with the company NIKO to sell the building for 1 billion CZK, but subsequently failed to pay the agreed amount. A similar scenario happened one year later with the Singaporean company Wells Holding and an agreed selling price of 550 million CZK. Finally the building was sold in 1999 to the company ECM for just 285 million CZK.

After a long planning process and legislative planning steps the radical reconstruction of the building, designed by Richard Meier, began in 2005 and was completed in 2008. On 20 December 2007 the building obtained final building approval. The first tenants started to move into the building at the beginning of 2008. The largest renter is Raiffeisenbank, a.s. which occupies 10 floors of the building with about 1200 employees.

Over 2300 tons of new steel structures were used for its reconstruction. The facade consists of 30,500 m^{2} of glass sheets. 800 parking spaces were built in the underground floors. There are 18 lifts in the building. Elevators reach speeds of up to 6 meters per second and the official web page claims they are the fastest lifts in the Czech Republic. On the 27th floor is the highest restaurant in the Czech Republic, it has been since 2013 repeatedly awarded Michelin's Bib Gourmand award.

In 2009 ECM sold City Tower for €130 millions to Czech company Marpona a.s. Transaction was backed up by J&T. The building was owned by PPF until its sale to Česká spořitelna for 4.4 billion CZK in September 2016.

== Gallery ==
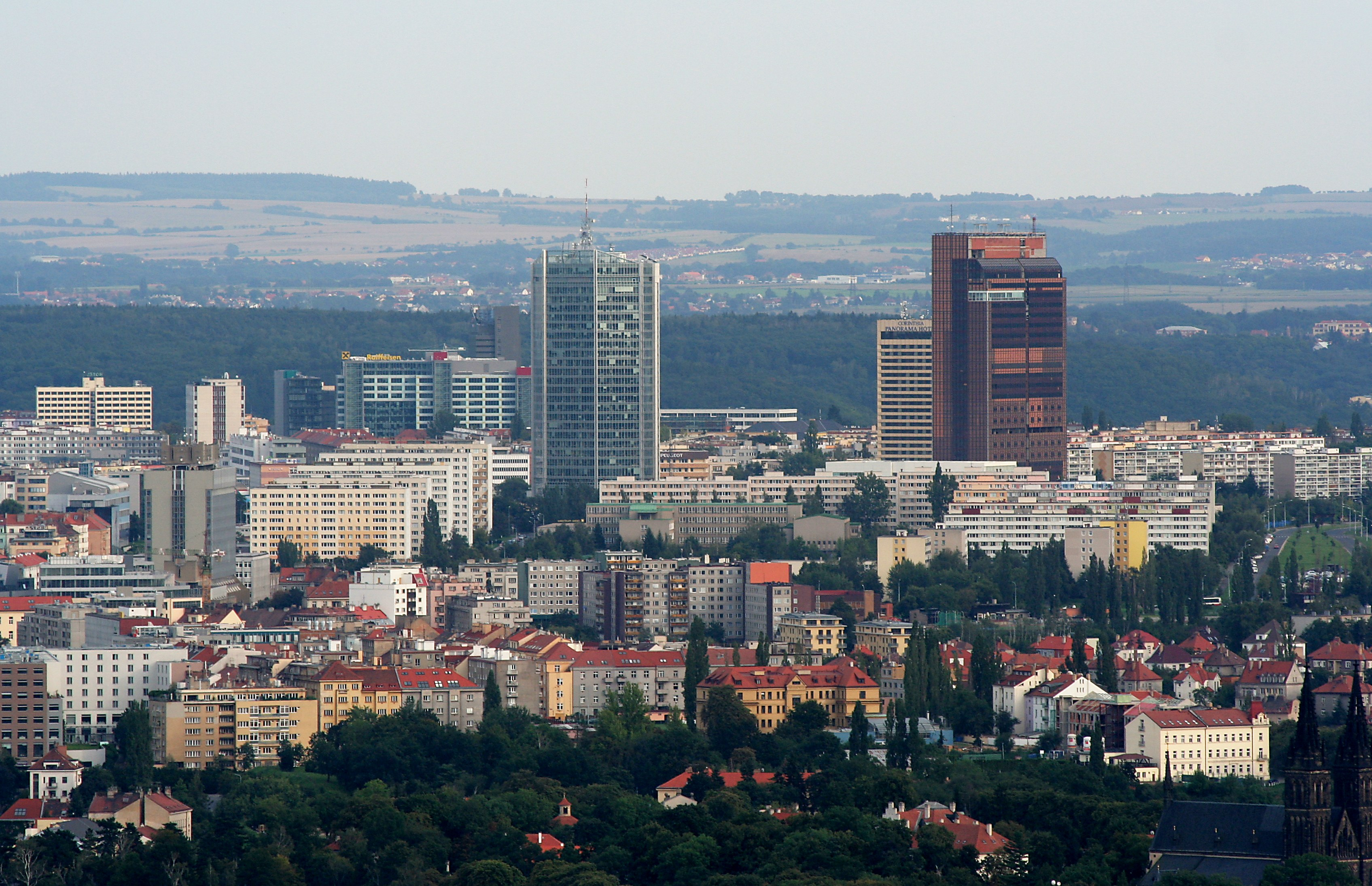
Prague skyscrapers, City Tower on right (year 2005, before reconstruction)

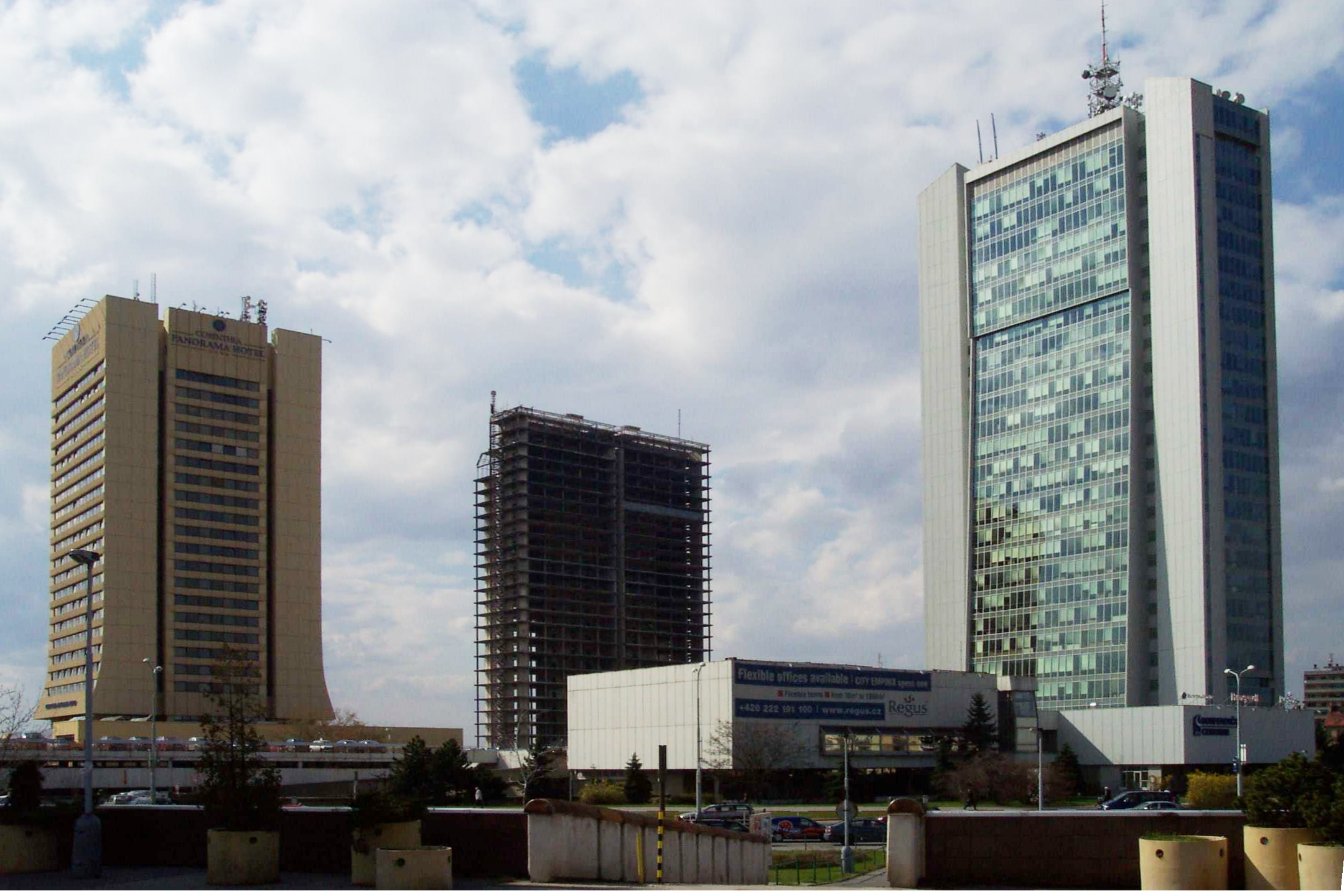
City Tower in centre (year 2006, during reconstruction)

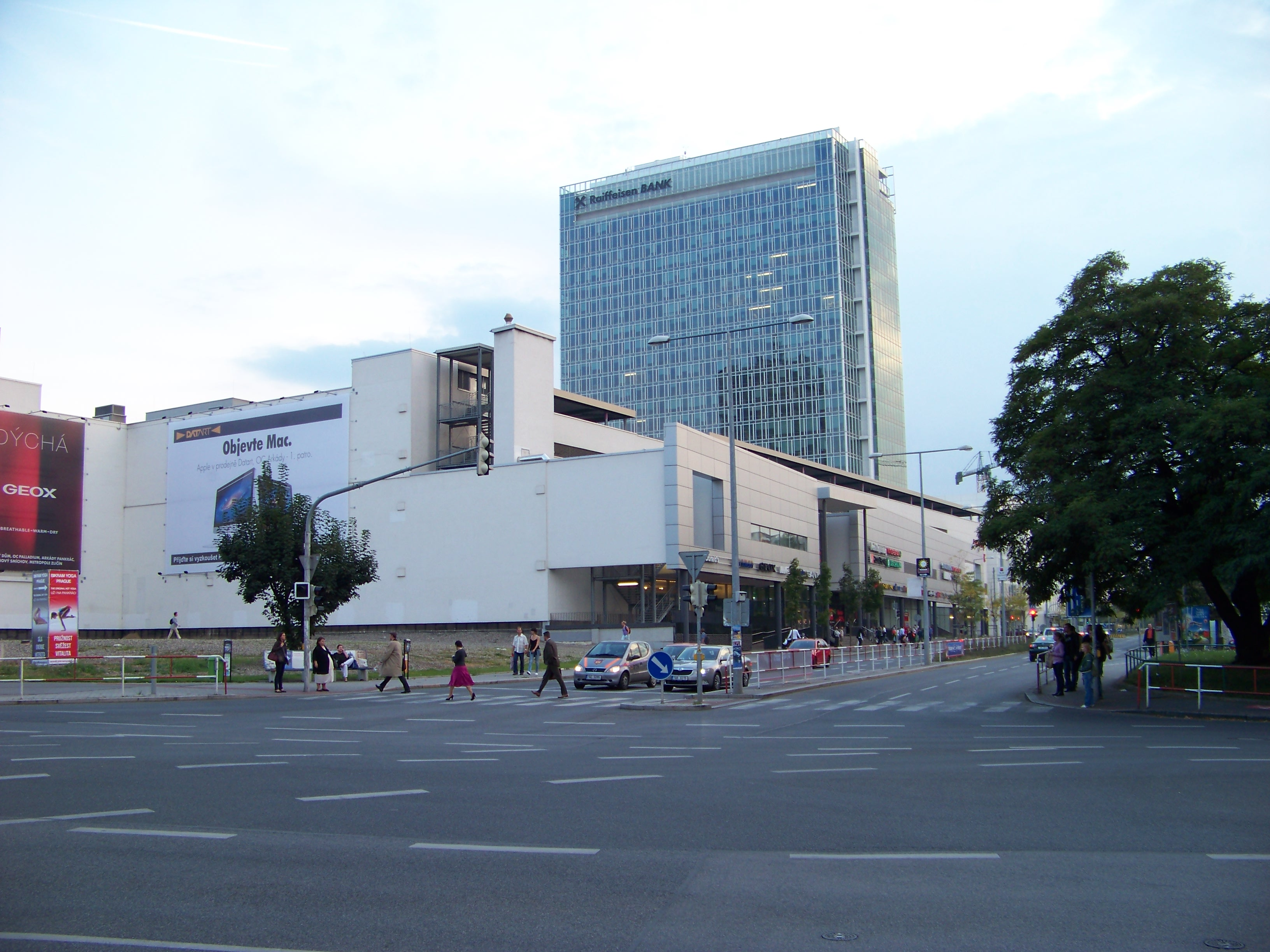
City Tower and shopping mall Arkády Pankrác

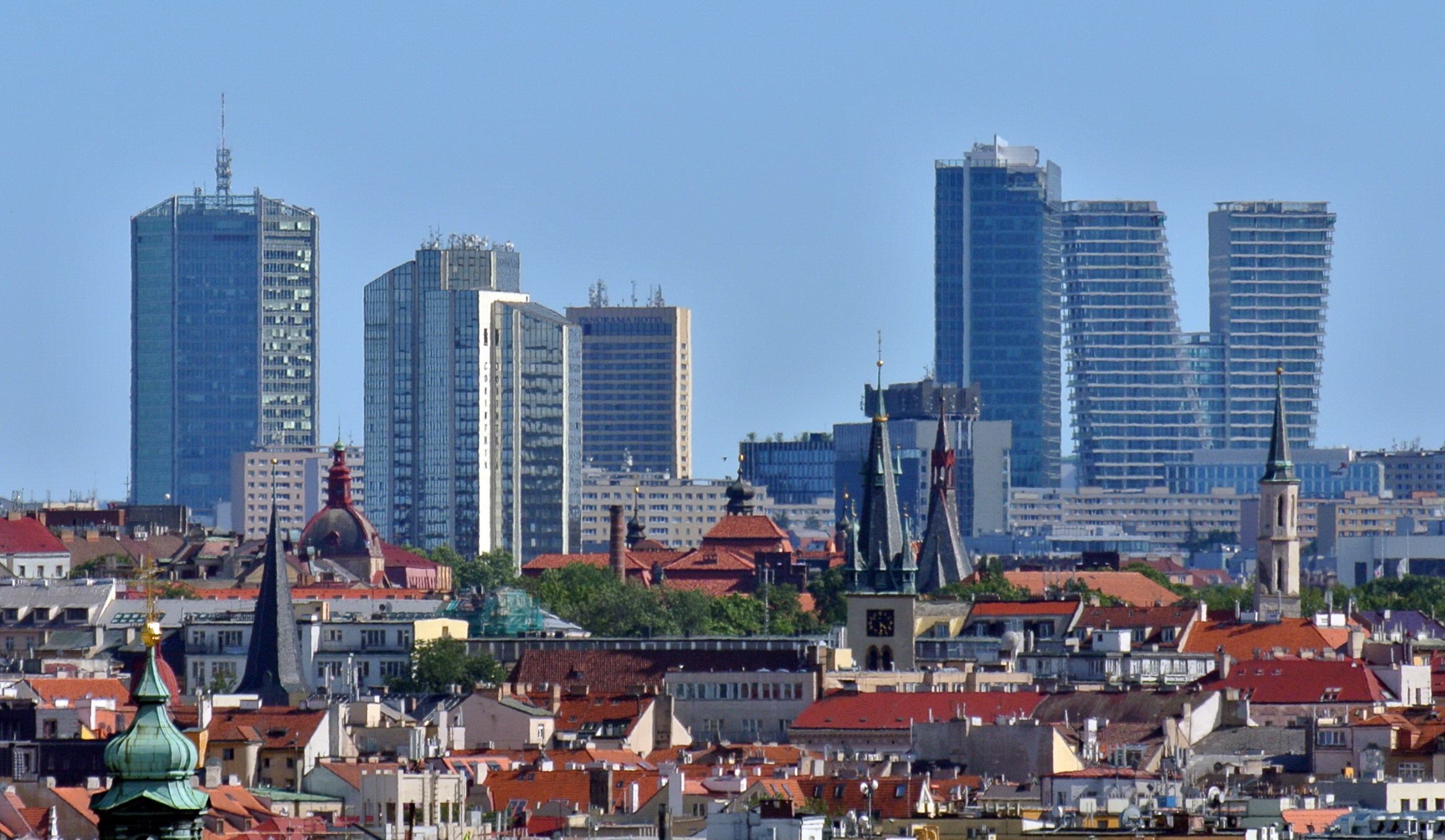
Prague skyscrapers panorama in 2018

== See also ==
- List of tallest buildings in Prague
- List of tallest buildings in the Czech Republic
