= Grand Hotel International Prague =

Hotel in the Czech Republic

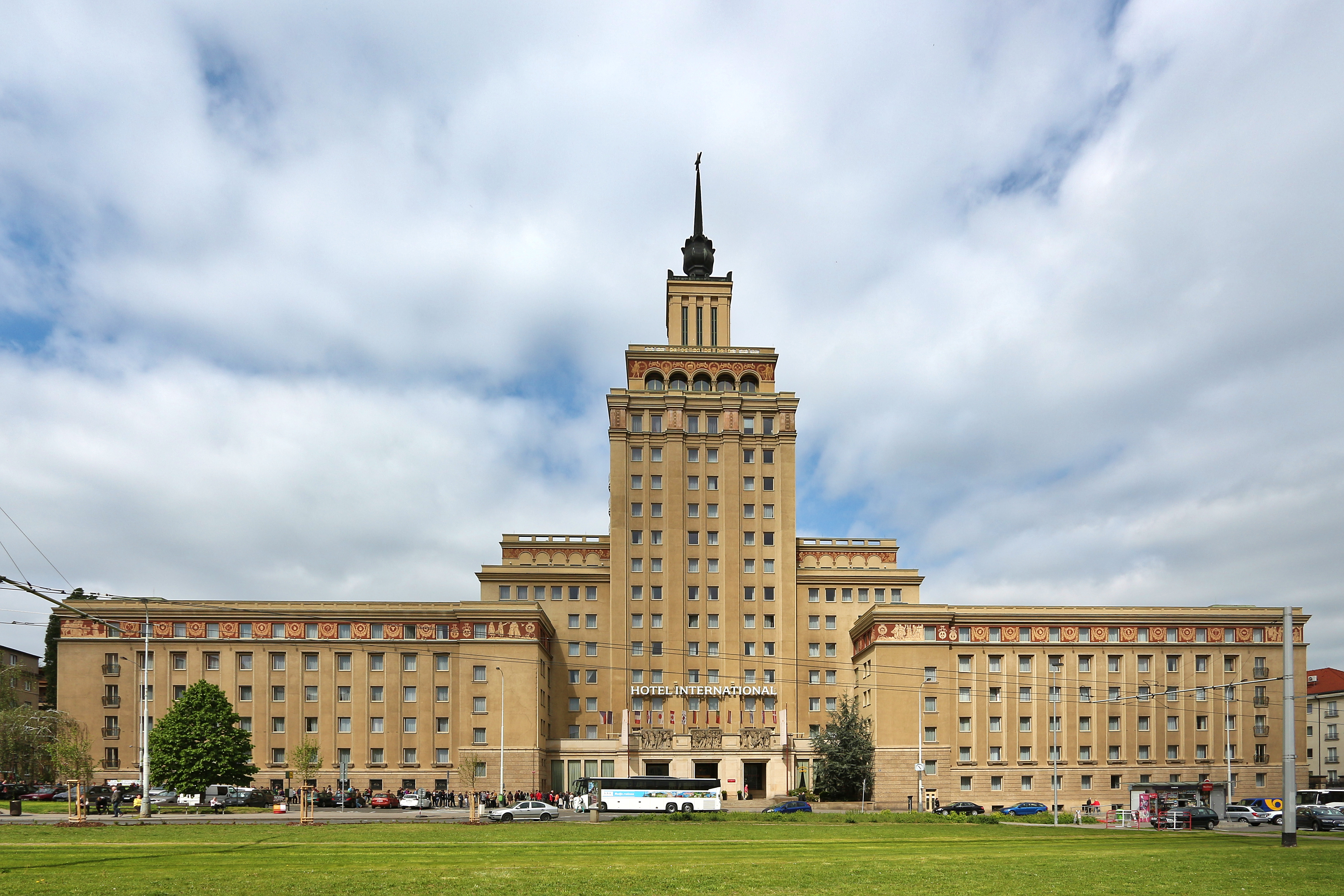
- Former names: Hotel Družba; Hotel Čedok; Hotel Holiday Inn; Hotel Crowne Plaza; Hotel International
- Hotel chain: Czech Inn Hotels

General information
- Architectural style: Stalinist architecture
- Location: Prague, Czech Republic, Koulova 15, 16000, Prague 6
- Coordinates: 50°6′33″N 14°23′36″E
- Construction started: 1952
- Completed: 1956
- Inaugurated: 1957
- Client: Alexej Čepička

Height
- Height: 88 m (289 ft)

Technical details
- Floor count: 15

Design and construction
- Architect: František Jeřábek
- Designations: Czech cultural monument

Other information
- Number of rooms: 278

Website
- www.hotelint.cz

The Grand Hotel International Prague is a four-star hotel located in the Dejvice quarter of Prague, in the Czech Republic. It was completed in 1956 in the socialist realism style, and is a Czech cultural monument. The hotel has retained much of its original interior artwork, contains 278 guest rooms, and was originally designed as a military hotel before public use as a luxury hotel. It has previously operated under the names Hotel Družba, Hotel Čedok, Hotel Holiday Inn and Hotel Crowne Plaza.

== History ==
The hotel is located in the Dejvice quarter of the Prague 6 municipal district, and was recognized on the list of Czech cultural monuments on 4 July 2000. Construction of the hotel took place from 1952 to 1956, with interior decorations finished in 1957. The hotel built with the support of Alexej Čepička, the Czechoslovak Minister of Defence, who envisioned a monument to the newly formed Fourth Czechoslovak Republic that would reinforce ties with the Soviet Union.

The original plans were commissioned from the college of architects at the Military Project Institute in 1951, and called the site Hotel Družba, the Russian word for friendship. The original function was military accommodations in a rectangular floor plan to house out-of-town officers. This draft was never sent to the public archives and kept secret. The final construction site for the new hotel was chosen in 1951, and architect František Jeřábek worked with the military on a new set of plans, which were more complicated and included a luxury hotel. Plans were revised in the late construction stage to add an extra two steps on the already finished central staircase, to accommodate one step for each of the forty-four Czechoslovak generals at that time.

When it was completed in 1957, the hotel had the largest capacity in Czechoslovakia. The Hotel Družba was opened up to public use and its name was switched to the Hotel Čedok in 1957, sharing the name of the national travel agency for tourism in the Czech Republic. Later in 1957, a public competition was held to rename the building, and Hotel International was chosen. Other suggested names included Podbaba, Juliska, Máj, Mír, Slovan, Experiment, Eldorádo, Stůlka prostři se, and Den a noc.

After the communist regime fell during the Velvet Revolution in 1989, the hotel became part of the Holiday Inn chain. The original illuminated communist-inspired red star that adorned the top of the building's spire was changed to green, the color of the Holiday Inn logo. The star was later changed to a gold color in 2007, and the hotel subsequently became part of the Crowne Plaza chain.

The hotel returned to using the Hotel International name on 1 July 2014, when it was sold by the InterContinental Hotels Group, and purchased by Gerstner Imperial Hotels and Residences of Austria. It has been part of the Mozart Hotel Group since 2015. In March 2023, the hotel became part of the Czech Inn Hotels chain and change its name to Grand Hotel International Prague.

== Design ==
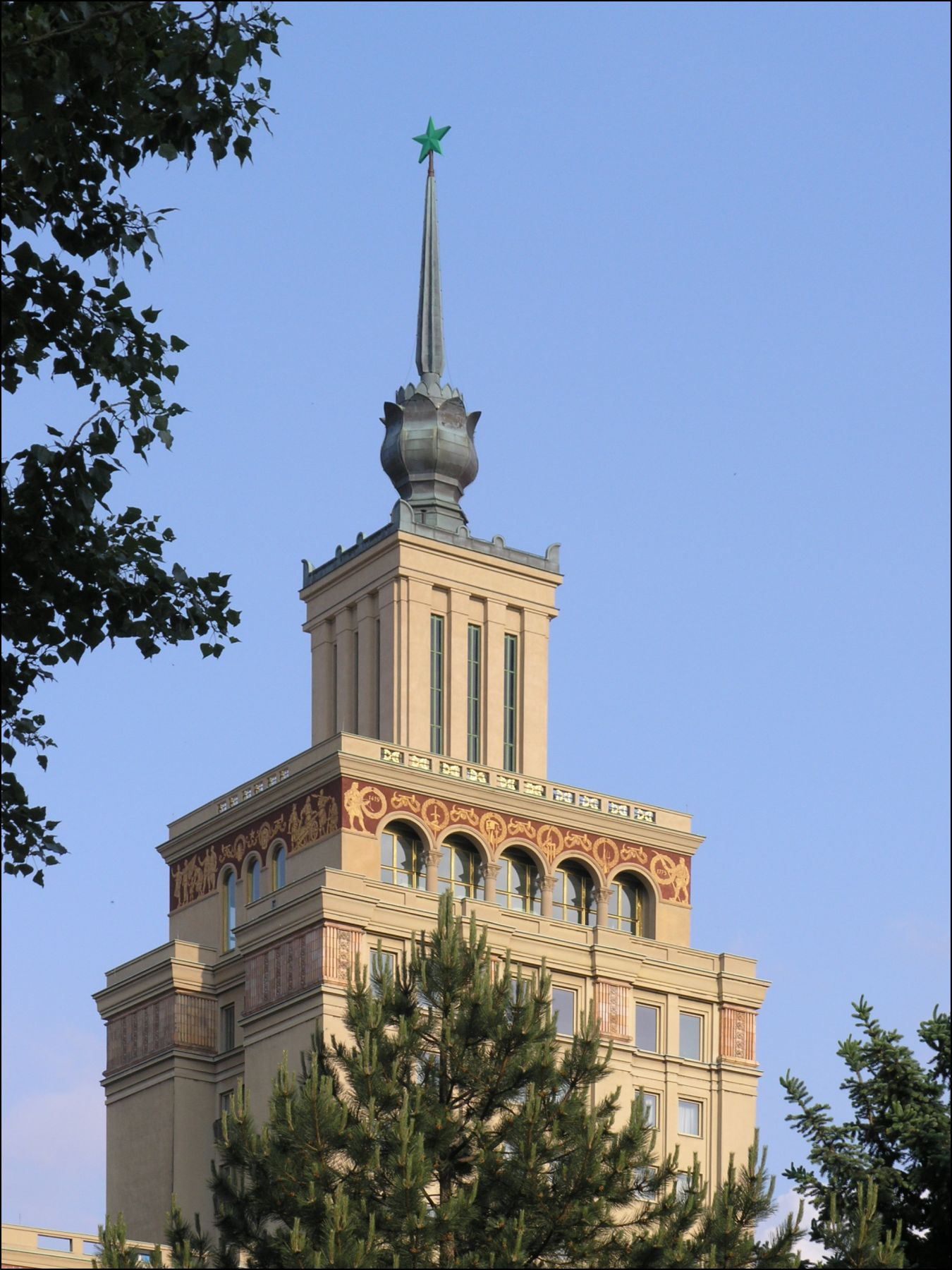
Close-up view of the upper portion of the hotel, and the Holiday Inn's green star atop the spire

The hotel was constructed in the socialist realism style. It is the largest Stalinist architecture building in Prague at 88 meters (289 ft) tall, and was inspired by the Seven Sisters in Moscow. The hotel is divided into two symmetrical wings, with a large central tower, and the former officers' gym was converted into a convention hall with a bar. The entrance hall and the main staircase include a stucco and painted ceiling, marble columns, and artworks on its walls to create a palatial atmosphere. The original lobby, reception area and main staircase have all been preserved. The hotel still has some of its original furniture mixed with some modern features. The five-pointed star atop the hotel has the ability to be lowered on the spire for regular cleaning and maintenance done at night.

In 2006, the Museum of Decorative Arts in Prague acquired the estate of František Trmač, who was an assistant to the architect Jeřábek. It included samples and designs of original tapestry and carpet designs, wall paintings, stucco designs for walls and ceilings, window layouts, parquet and wall paneling, seating furniture and lights. It also included historical photographs from the construction phase of the hotel, and perspective drawings of the surrounding area. Trmač had also designed much of the original furniture.

== Interior art ==
The interior decorations of the hotel were overseen by local artists Max Švabinský, and Cyril Bouda. The hotel features wrought iron fixtures, including a staircase railing done by Jan Nušl, a Czech blacksmith. Glass panels are featured in the hotel, which include Czech national motifs from artists Jaroslav Brychta and Vilém Dostrasil. The chandeliers and wall lamps were made in the glassworks from the towns of Kamenický Šenov and Valašské Meziříčí. Some walls of the hotel are painted with plant motifs from artists Josef Novák and Stanislav Ullman. The hotel also features several Gobelin tapestries from the Moravská gobelínová manufaktura, which includes Czech national and folklore themes. The largest tapestry called Praga Regina Musicae is located in the entrance hall, and features a view of Prague with the former Stalin monument in Letná Park in the middle. On the top floor of the tower, is a spiral staircase with a colorful bouquet mosaic covering the whole wall.

== Amenities ==
The Grand Hotel International has a four-star hotel rating, with services provided in five languages, including Czech, English, French, German and Russian. The hotel features a conference centre that includes 14 halls with a capacity of 1200 people, and other renovations in 2016 increased the number of guest rooms to 278. Dining facilities in the hotel include, The Harvest restaurant, the Racianska Vinarna restaurant, a lobby cafe and bar, and a club lounge on the 14th and 15th floors, with a skyline view of downtown Prague.

== Notable events ==
In the 1950s and 1960s, the hotel hosted regular friendship social events for local residents, which later grew in popularity when promoted by the Čedok travel agency, and hosted the annual two-day Staropražský bál for Prague 6 residents. The hotel regularly hosted the Circus Humberto series, and circus acts by the Berousek family. The hotel was featured prominently in the musical comedy film Big Beat set in 1959, directed by Jan Hřebejk. During the 1968 Warsaw Pact invasion of Czechoslovakia, the American film The Bridge at Remagen was being filmed, and the cast and crew were relocated into the hotel before being permitted travel to Austria. During the 1972 World Ice Hockey Championships in Prague, the hotel hosted negotiations between Joe Kryczka of Canada, and Andrey Starovoytov of the Soviet Union, for the international ice hockey event that became the 1972 Summit Series.
