= V Tower (Prague) =

Skyscraper in Prague, Czech Republic

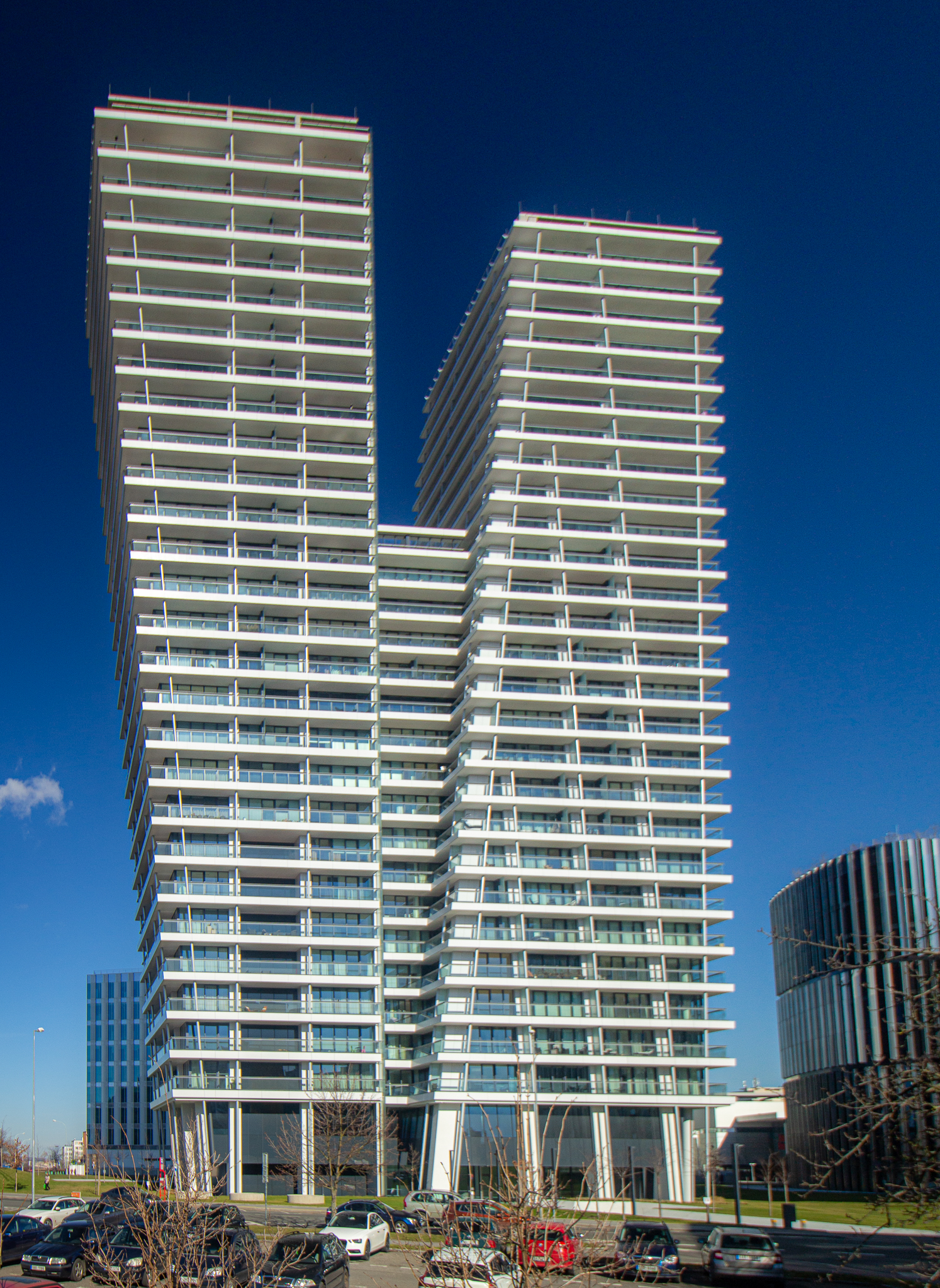
- Interactive map of the V Tower area

General information
- Status: Completed
- Type: Residences
- Location: Milevská 2094/3, Prague 4, Czech Republic, 140 00
- Coordinates: 50.0492°N 14.4364°E
- Construction started: 2015
- Completed: 2018
- Opening: 2018
- Cost: 3,000,000,000 CZK

Height
- Roof: 104 m (341 ft)

Technical details
- Floor count: 30

Design and construction
- Architect: Radan Hubička
- Developer: Aceur Investments

V Tower is a skyscraper in Prague, Czech Republic. It is the tallest residential building in the Czech Republic with 104 meters in height and 30 floors. Construction started in 2016 and ended in 2018. It was designed by Czech architect Radan Hubička and the main investor was Aceur Investment.

== Location ==
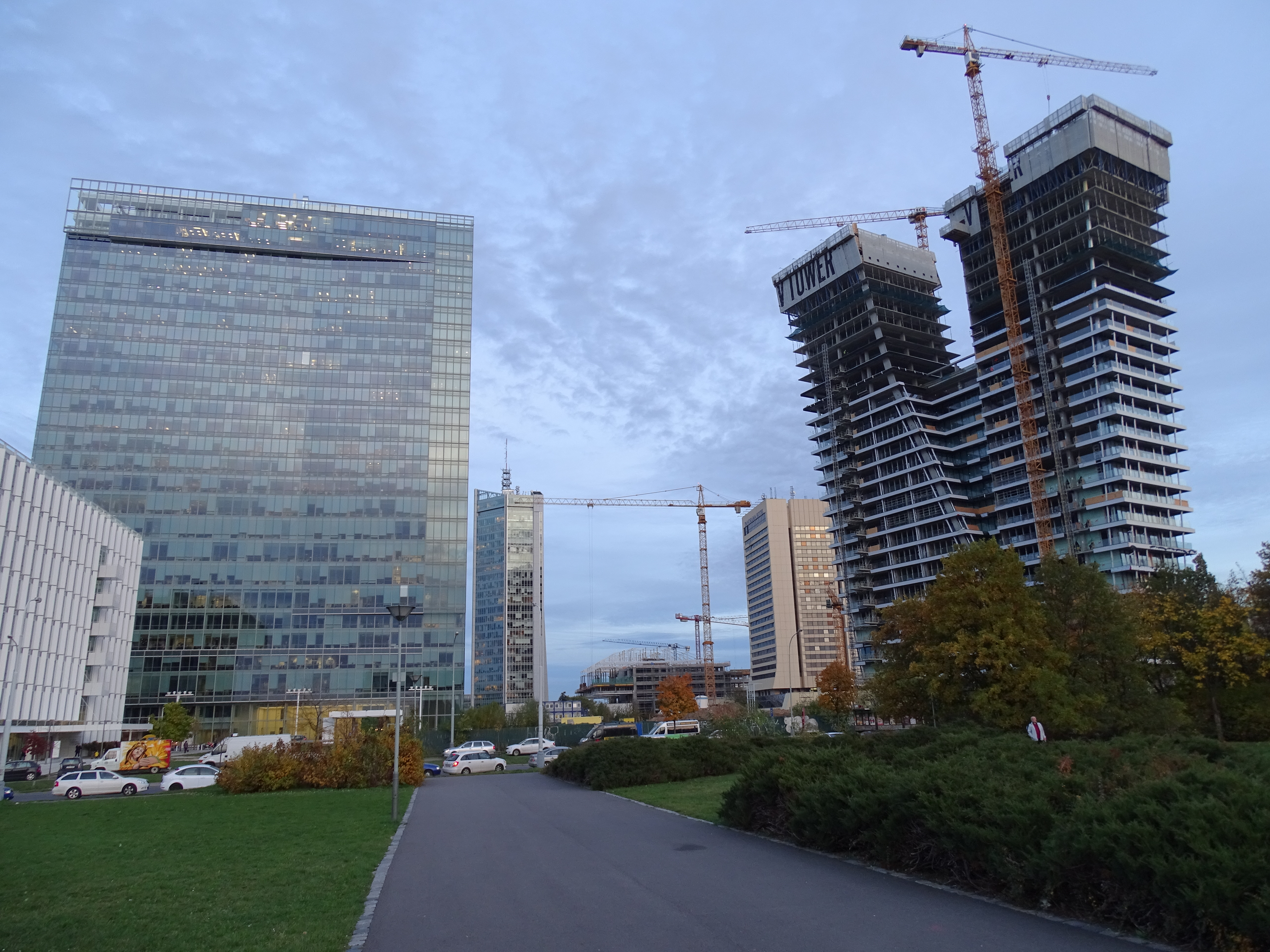
City Tower, City Empiria (in the background) and V Tower, 2016

The building is located in an area above the Vltava river with views of the city centre, as well as the Prague Castle and the residential neighbourhoods Vysehrad and Vinohrady. The apartment complex is also to be situated close to a number of leisure facilities or schools. The site is approximately the same distance from the downtown shops on Pařížská street, and the State Opera, as it is to the Hodkovicky Golf Resort and the Velka Chuchle horse racing facility.

Pankrác Plain is the only suitable location within the center of Prague which is suitable for the construction of high-rise flats. This was verified using a number of widely accepted architectural tests which date back many years. The tower is to be situated on Pankrác Plain and will be near three other pre-existing buildings. These high-rises are each of 109, 104, and 79 meters in height. Because of the high number of high-rises in the area, the plain has been dubbed the “Prague Manhattan” as the skyline is becoming reminiscent of one which would be seen in New York. In addition to the other buildings which are also situated on the plain, V Tower will be close to a residential building, which is also yet to be built, but is planned to have a height of 108 metres.

== Description ==
An example of modern Czech architecture, the building is divided into a pair of towers which are to be linked at two-thirds of their height, above which they continue upwards separately. This is allowing for the tower to expand in size as it rises whilst minimising its ground appropriation, leaving space for terraces around the outside of the building. The larger area towards the top of the towers is where the residential apartments are, resulting in the highest apartments having more space than those which are slightly closer to the bottom of the towers.

== Development ==
=== Design ===
The "V" (Victoria) is the general symbol of openness, freedom, joy and optimism. The idea behind the shape of V Tower is also to represent the yin and yang – the masculine and the feminine. The building itself is constructed of glass walls which are designed so that they will reflect light from every angle, as opposed from being transparent. Glass partitions and sliding doors will be used inside the apartments to create the openness of which the "V" is symbolic. V Tower was designed by the award-winning architectural studio, Radan Hubička. The architectural studio has been successful in producing renowned designs for residential buildings and luxury apartments and, in 2005, the company won a competition to design the City Epoque Complex in Prague. This is now the location of V Tower, in addition to a four star Sheraton Hotel.

The apartments in V Tower boast technology never seen before in the Czech Republic, including technology for tranquil cooling, heating and ventilation to ensure the right temperature for residents which has only been seen before at the 2010 Olympics sites in Vancouver, Canada, and in a small number of residences in Côte d'Azur, France. The developers also focused on the smart use of electric energy. Working on the acoustics of the apartments are British experts who specialise in soundproofing. This will be done to prevent excessive noise caused by high winds – particularly in the higher apartments.

=== ECM Real Estate Investments Bankruptcy ===
The original developer of V Tower was ECM Real Estate Investments but, upon the company's bankruptcy in 2013, Aceur Investments took over the project. This resulted in the redesigning of the building, with the new developers working in conjunction with architect Radan Hubička to create the new designs. The plans changed so drastically that new planning and construction permits had to be acquired before construction could begin and the progress of development was pushed back by two years, with new completion date expected to be in the third quarter of 2017. When the project was being developed by ECM Real Estate Investments, it was called "Epoque".

=== Cost ===
The construction cost of V Tower was estimated in 2015 to be 3 Billion Czech koruna.

== Objections ==
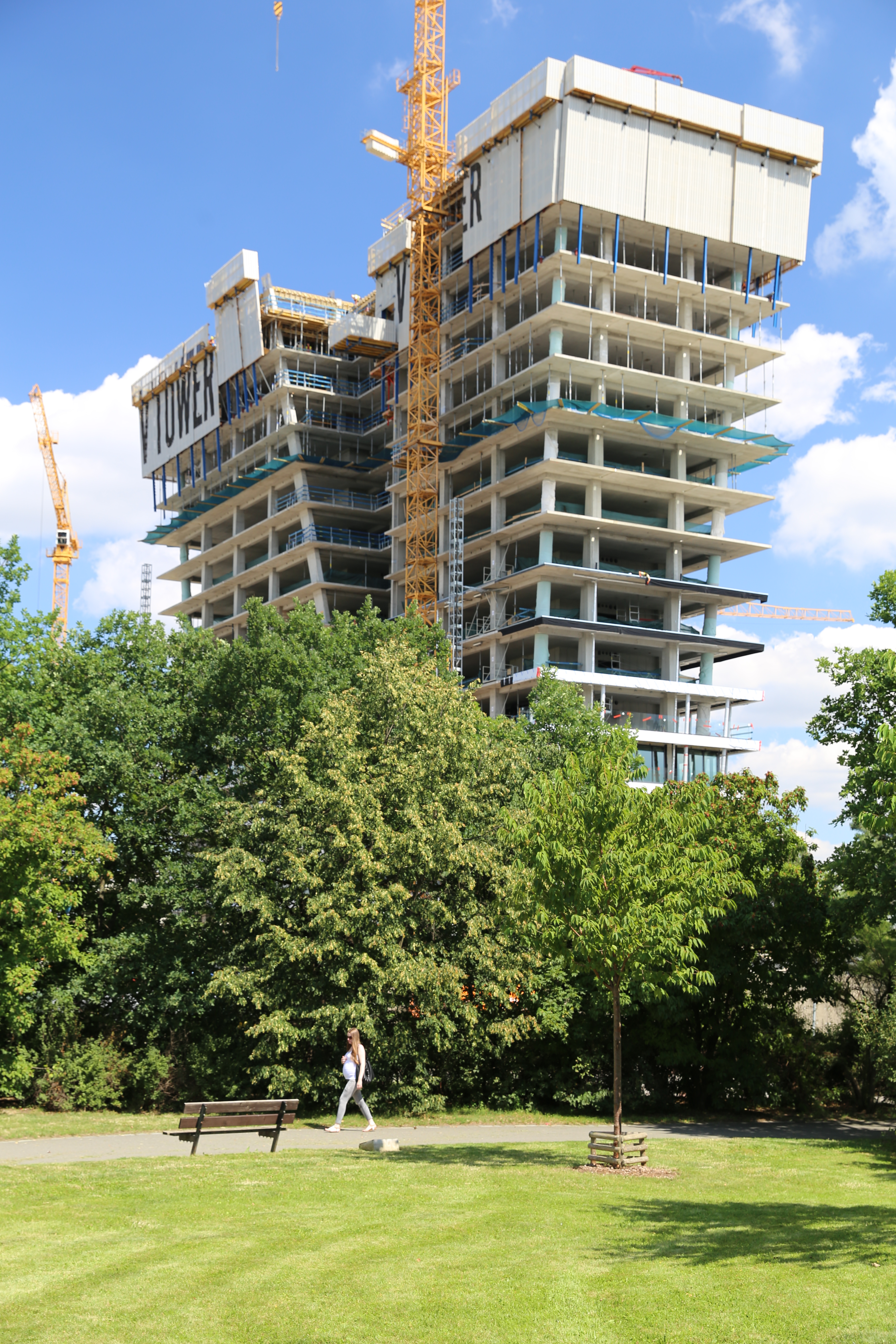
V Tower during construction in summer 2016

In the initial stages of planning V Tower (even before ECM Real Estate Investments went bankrupt) there were concerns over whether or not the building would be approved. Prague locals objected to the further construction of high-rises and started a campaign in an attempt to prevent the towers from being built. This campaign was picked up by experts from UNESCO World Heritage Committee, who were also worried that the "skyscrapers" would destroy Prague's historical and unique skyline. UNESCO objected to the heights of the buildings which were proposed to be erected in such close proximity to Prague's historical centre. They required one of the proposed buildings be reduced to a maximum height of 70 metres as they feared any higher could be detrimental to Prague's tourist industry. The result of this decision was that the Ministry of Culture of the Czech Republic reviewed their decision to construct the buildings. The plans for the buildings had to be revised due to this in order to try and resolve the issue. When development was taken over by Aceur Investments, there were no new concerns raised over the new construction plans, and V Tower has been allowed to go ahead as planned.

== Apartments ==
There are 120 flats in total, ranging from smaller studios, to large apartments, and four story penthouses with private gardens and recreational swimming pools on the roof of the complex. Additionally, there is a gym, a spa and sauna, and a swimming pool available to all residents between the ground floor and the third level, as well as facilities to care for the residents' pets, dry cleaning facilities, and catering services. The ground floor of the complex will consist only of a reception desk and vertical cores. There is also to be a concierge in the lobby at all times and each apartment owner will have access to the tower's garages, where they can safely park their vehicles whilst on the premises. These garages are located underneath the complex, with 254 spaces across 3 floors. Additionally, there is a dedicated team of handymen working at the complex who cater to the needs of the residents. The individual apartments are all designed to be primarily sunlit and will open into the park area which surrounds the building. There are one to five bedrooms in each apartment and residents will have access to a children's room in the building.

The sales of the V Tower's apartments launched in September, 2015. The apartments have been put on the market at a starting price of 100,000 Crowns (approximately US$3200) per square meter. However, the higher up the apartment is in the complex, the higher the price becomes and Aceur Investments have been unwilling to disclose the cost of the most expensive apartments and luxury penthouses. The flats vary in their size with the smallest ones being 50 square meters and the largest being 380 square meters.

== Awards ==
The V Tower won two awards before its completion. The building received both Best Residential High-rise Architecture Czech Republic and Best Residential High-rise Development Czech Republic awards in the European category at the International Property Awards in 2015. It also aspires to acquire Leadership in Energy & Environmental Design (LEED) Platinum certification, requiring the building to adhere to what are considered to be the most stringent set of requirements before it can receive the green building certification. It is the only building in the Czech Republic and the whole of Europe to have achieved such ranking. V Tower also reached the final of the International Property Awards in 2015.
