= Grand Hotel Prague Towers =

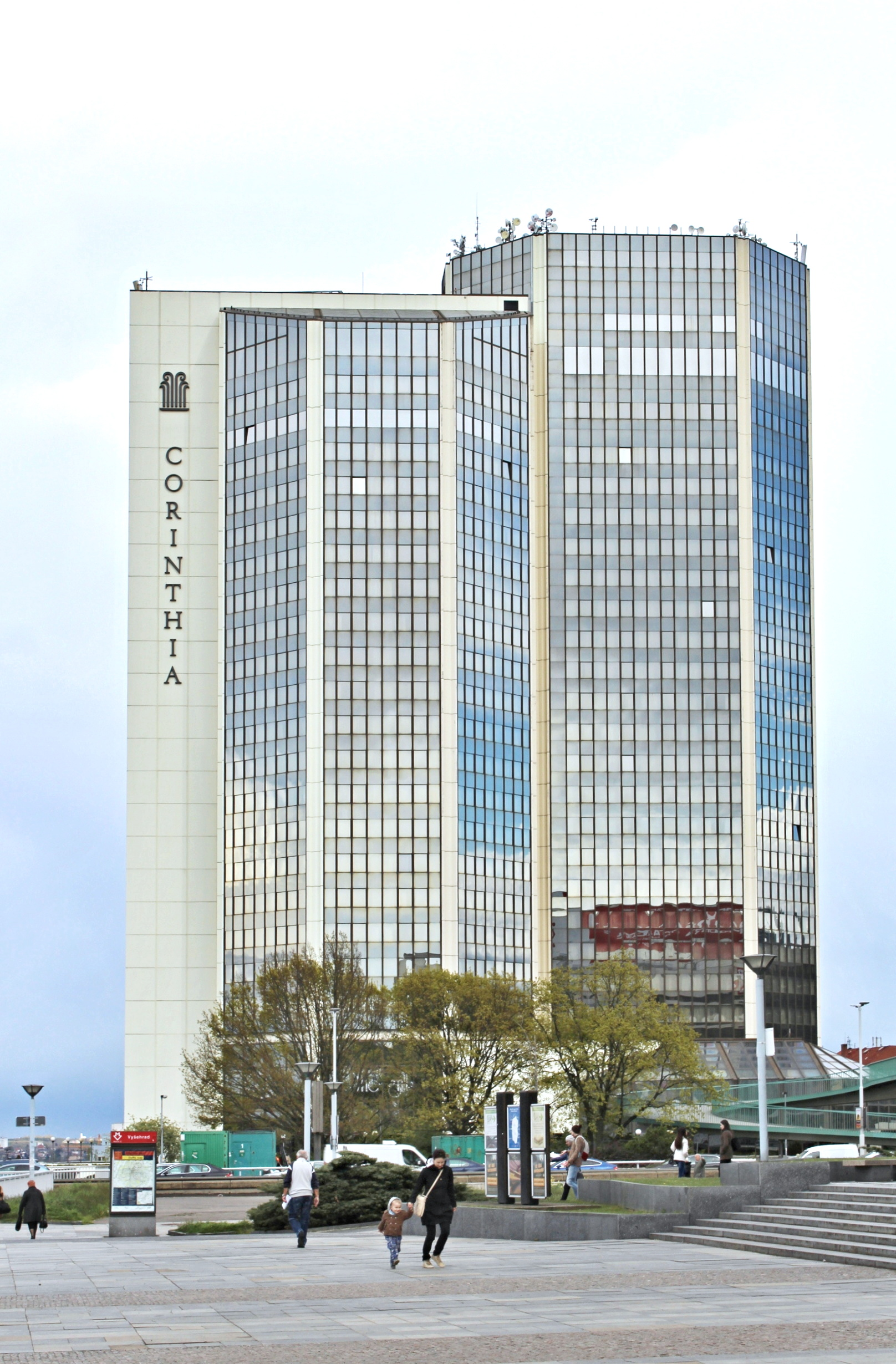
- Interactive map of the Grand Hotel Prague Towers area
- Former names: Hotel Fórum, Corinthia Prague

General information
- Location: Nusle, Prague, Czech Republic
- Coordinates: 50°3′46.34″N 14°25′55.71″E
- Completed: 1988
- Owner: International Hotel Investments
- Operator: Czech Inn Hotels

Height
- Architectural: 84 m
- Antenna spire: 90 m
- Top floor: 26

Other information
- Number of rooms: 539

The Grand Hotel Prague Towers, formerly the Corinthia Hotel Prague and the Corinthia Towers Hotel, is a highrise luxury hotel in Prague's Nusle District, next to the Prague Congress Centre and Vyšehrad Metro station. Its height is 84 m (276 ft), with an antenna spire reaching 90 m (300 ft). It was built in 1988 as the Hotel Forum Praha, operated by the Forum Hotels division of Inter-Continental Hotels. It contains 26 floors (two underground), 539 rooms, a 14-metre-long pool, a wellness center, several restaurants and congress halls.
