= Pankrác =

Neighborhood of Prague, Czech Republic

Coordinates: 50°3′23.02″N 14°26′5.56″E

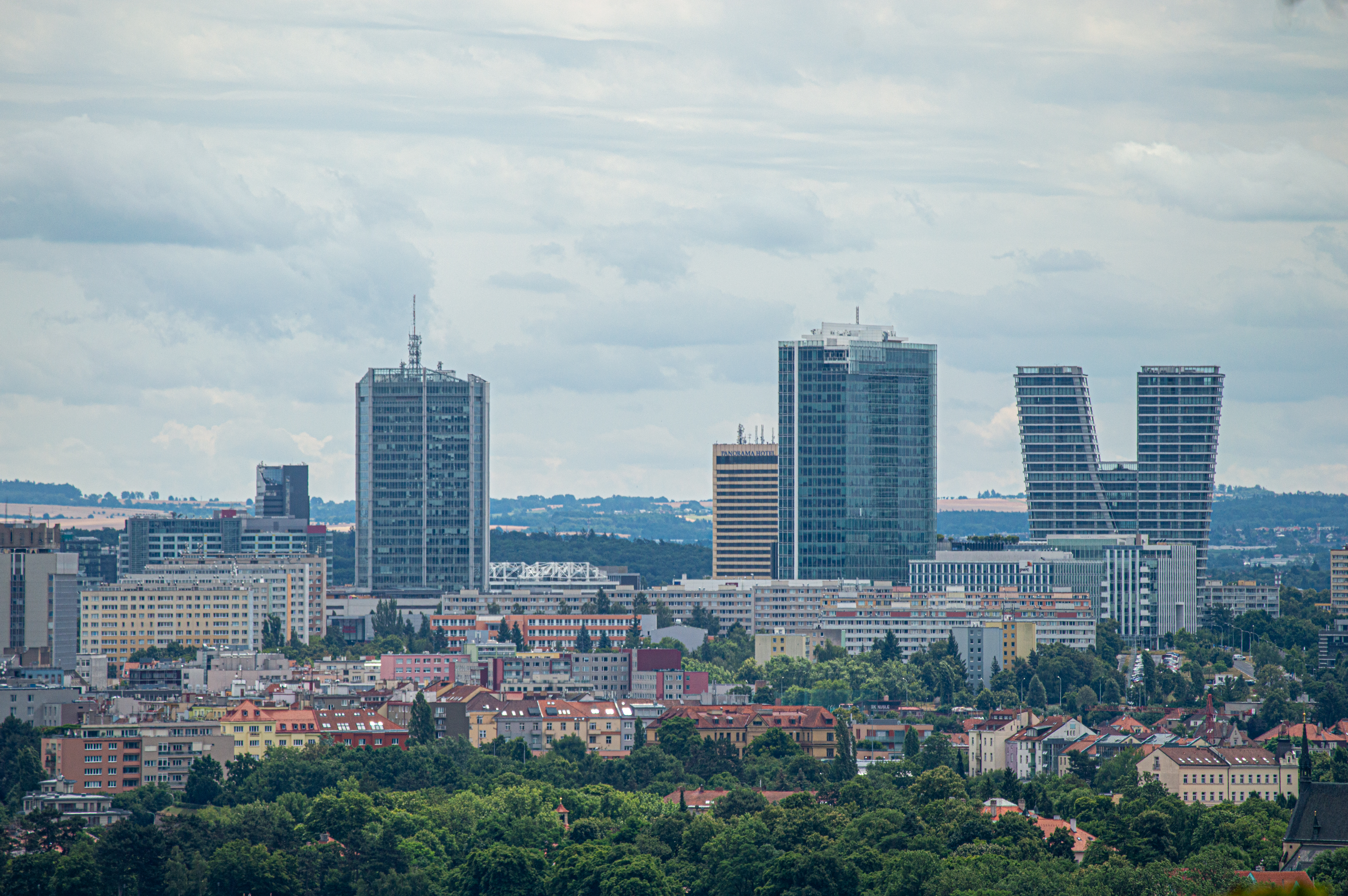
Overall view of Pankrác from Strahov

Pankrác is a neighborhood of Prague, Czech Republic. It is located south of the city centre on the hills of the eastern bank of the Vltava River and is part of the Prague 4 municipal district, situated in the district of Nusle. Bordering districts are Krč on the south and southwest, Podolí on the west, Vyšehrad on the north and Michle on the east.

The name derives from the local baroque initially very old church of St Pancras (Pankrác in Czech), which is filial to the parish church of St. Wenceslas in Nusle. Pankrác is also a synonym for its prison, which lies within its borders.

Since the 1970s, several high-rise commercial buildings have been built in Pankrác Plain, and still others are being discussed amid some criticism that the skyline may threaten the historical character of Prague. Near the high-rise buildings is Centrální park (Central Park) with 4,8 ha, which is a place for recreation.

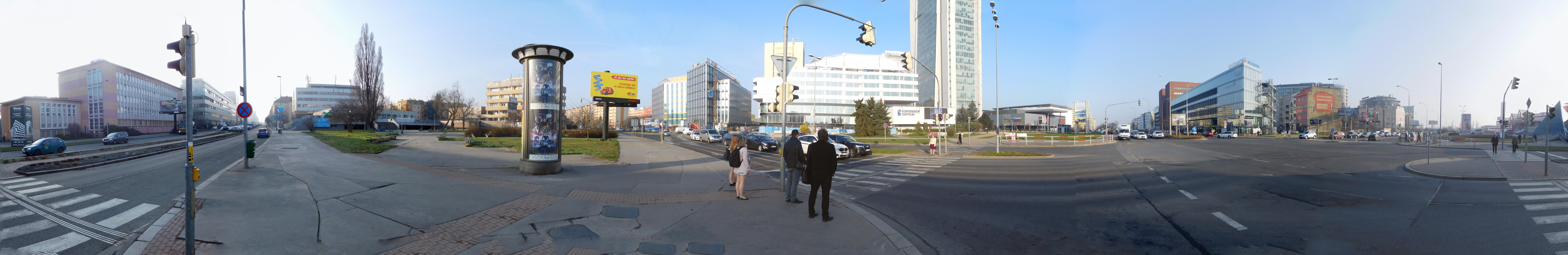
Panoramic view of Pankrác from its eastern side
