= City Empiria =

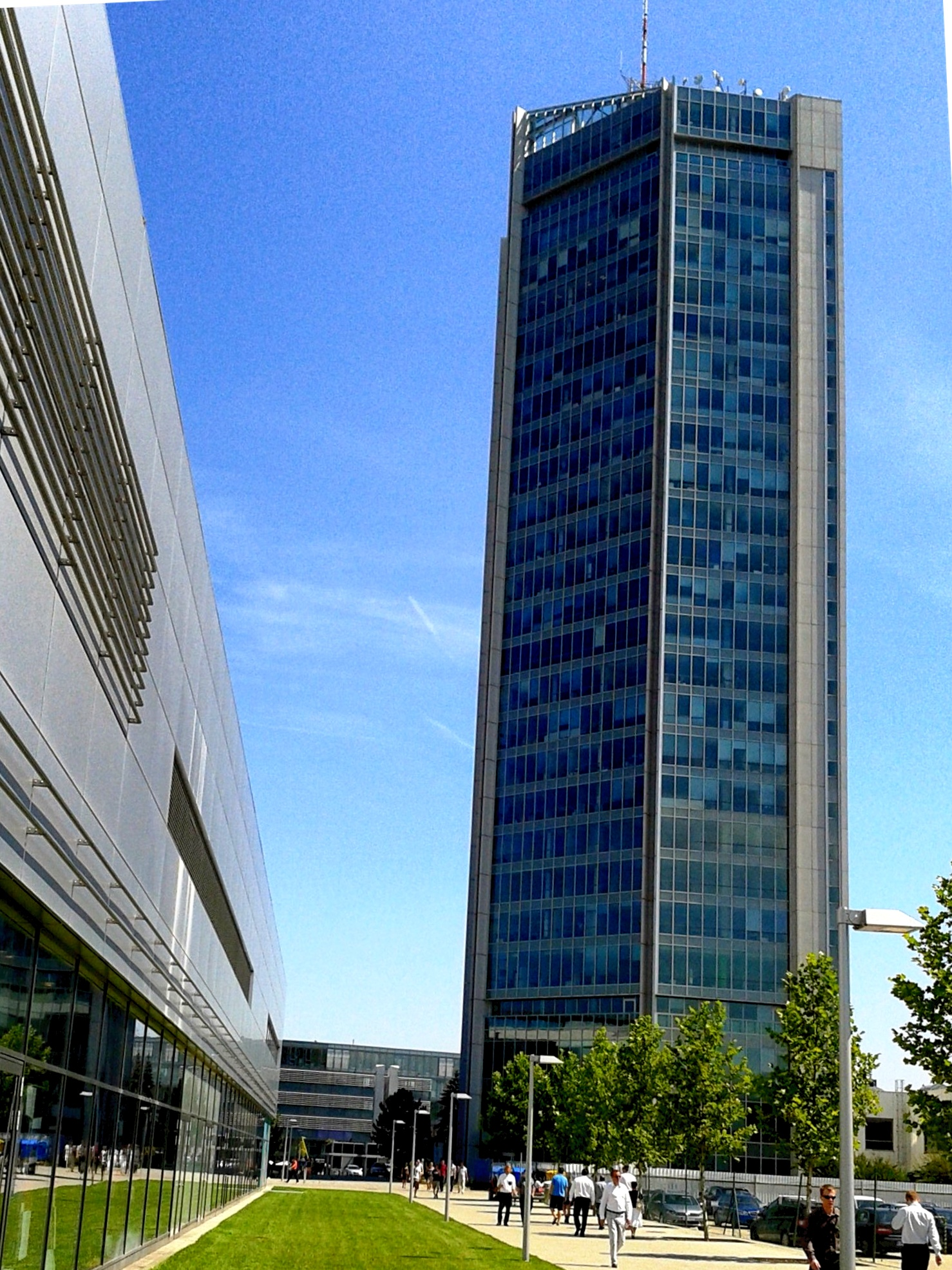
- Na Pankráci street
- Interactive map of the City Empiria area

General information
- Status: Completed
- Type: office
- Location: Hvězdova 1716/2b, Prague, Czech Republic, 140 00
- Coordinates: 50°03′00″N 14°26′22″E
- Construction started: 1975
- Completed: 1977
- Opening: 1977

Height
- Antenna spire: 132 m (433 ft)
- Roof: 104 m (341 ft)
- Top floor: 104 m (341 ft)

Technical details
- Floor count: 27
- Lifts/elevators: 8 fast lifts 1 cargo lift 1 evacuative lift

Design and construction
- Architects: Zdeněk Kuna, Zdeněk Stupka, Olivier Honke-Houfek, Milan Valenta, Jaroslav Zdražil

City Empiria (original name Motokov building), is a skyscraper in Prague. It is the third tallest building in the Czech Republic at 104 meters. The antenna reaches a height of 132 m. It was opened in 1977 as the headquarters of Czechoslovak trade company Motokov.

In 2001 ECM Real Estate Investments bought the building, and reconstructed it in 2005. In 2010, the building was sold to Generali PPF Holding for CZK 1.8 billion.

== Gallery ==
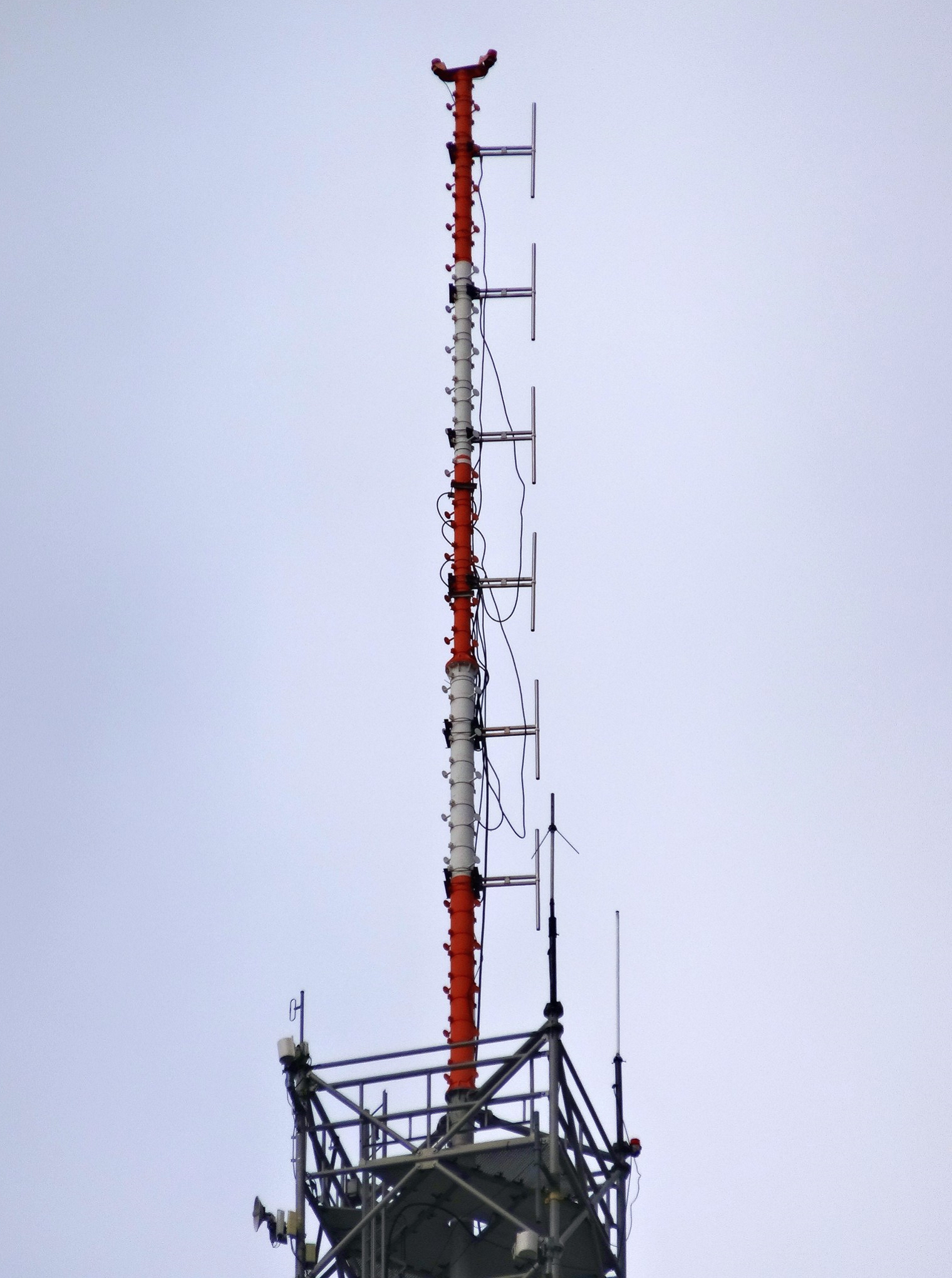
Details of Citi Empiria antenna

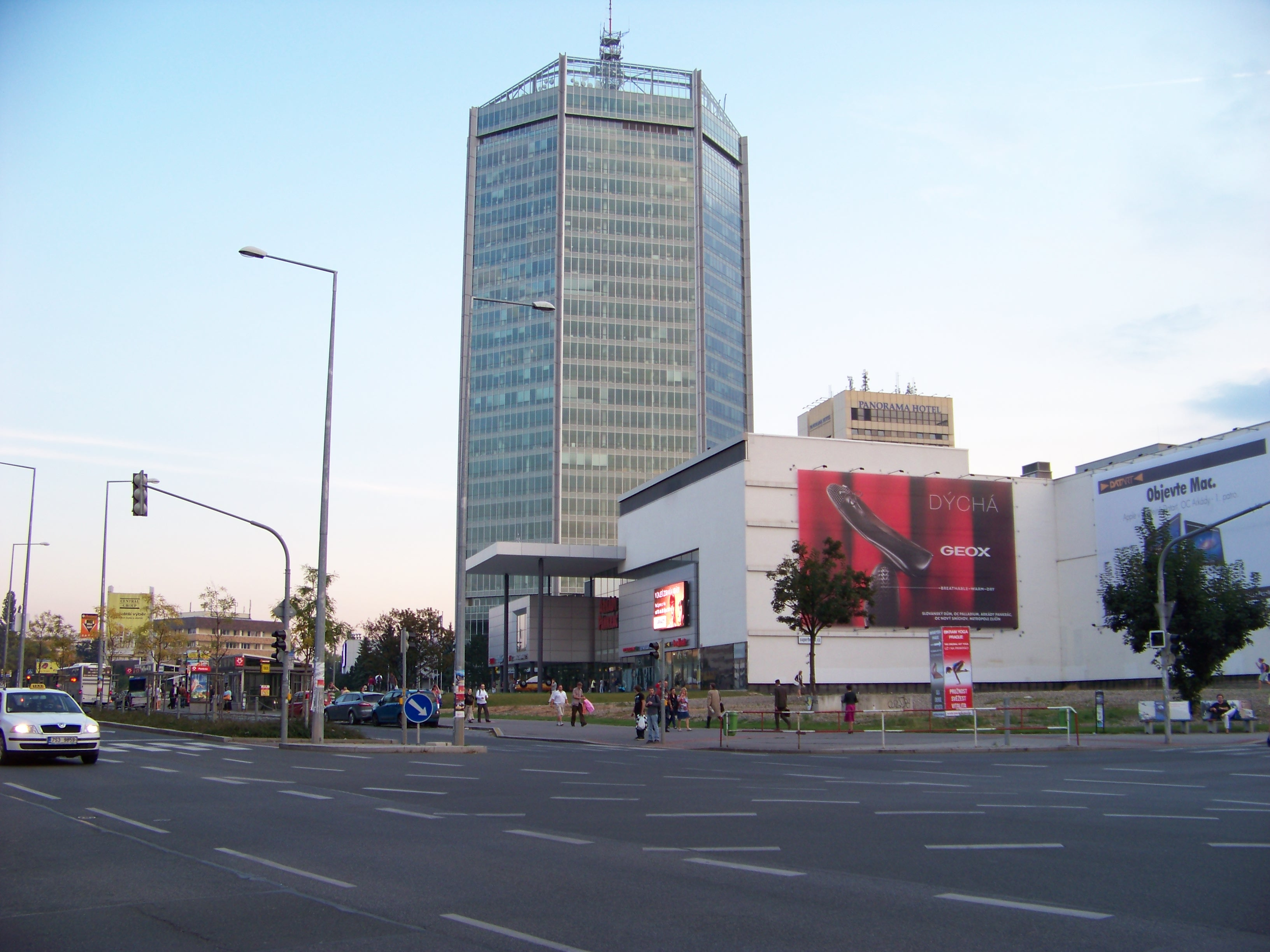
Business center Arkády Pankrác and City Empiria
