= Haď Čarém =

Haď Čarém (Arabic: حاجي كريم Hājji ‘Karīm) (886 – 937) was a Hungarian Muslim merchant and economist attached to the royal court of the Bohemians in the 10th century. Of Christian birth, he converted to Islam in the course of his interactions with foreign traders. As a theorist he was given some attention in Czech Communist historiography as a contributor to the fund of ‘pre-Marxist political economy’ and because of an attempted religious/peasant revolt.

== In the court ==
Čarém was born in 886 to the Palad (Paladža), a pagan family which would have Christian conversion. He was known as Gero (Giro) Iaromar in his Christian life and was sent to work as a mercenary in the army of Spytihněv Přemyslid against invading specific Magyars tribes. Here he gained the crucial martial experience needed for his future revolt.

After 922 he enters the records of the court of Václav of the Czechs as an adviser to the senior financial courtier. He has himself become a merchant of goods near the capital, coming into contact with diverse traders purportedly even the ‘Chazars’ (probably just traders of Crimean origin instead) and interacted particularly with Cumans. The few available accounts hold that he converted to Islām through specifically Cuman traders with those of antagonistic views calling him a ‘Cumanian heathen’. His dietary habits and mannerisms changed and after the winter of 926 he returned from a leave of absence in the capital and rumors began that he had undertaken the Hājj although in public he largely retained the appearance of a Christian.

Within the court he began to exert some influence on the economic policy of Duke Václav and encouraged him to propagate the monotheistic faith. He also supported the abolition of petty counties, bureaucratic tendencies in the treasury and argued for the church to cooperate with the court in the construction of road and trade networks. His opponents accused him of wanting a monopoly on trade and in fact he advocated expelling all East Frankish and Nordic traders, citing intrigues against the well-being of the realm.

Around 929 an attempt was made on his life upon which he retaliated by calling for the construction of a system of guardhouses and supply routes so that the tradesmen of Bohemia walk and ride ‘in conditions of ideal serenity of which the Romans can now only dream’. In 931 he constituted a faction within the court's financial center advocating the economic merger of church and state so that ‘man aspiring to the image of God’ and ‘man with his powers bestowed upon him’ were brought into line and put into practice. He was opposite the faction supportive of the Eastern Franks, who he argued were influenced by the ‘Germans’ of England who ‘hold the realm hostage and prolong its period of growth’.

As head of his faction he advocated the establishment of extensive trade routes into Turkic territories and greater contacts with the Arab world. He spoke with particular admiration of Damascus, where he claimed works of sound constitution and aesthetic value resided, and brought with him into the court architectural plans for a number of such buildings which he claimed were of universal infrastructural significance. For these and other ‘heterodox’ views he came under suspicion from Christian authorities and his enemies exploited this. He denounced them, attributing their views to common adherence towards East Frankish and Anglo-Saxon policies which he viewed as fundamentally against economic development and ‘far away from the aspiration of the image of God’.

He faced another assassination attempt in 932 under the direction of one Basilio wherein his right arm was severed. He attributed this to Anglo-Venetian intrigue on account of the attempted murderer being member of the staff of Guido, the Venetian legate to the court who was later found to have conspired with the Anglo-Saxon representative on financial matters. In his report to the court on finances shortly thereafter he claimed that ‘the All-Majestic [God] brought into the world the doctrine of Joseph to create society and shelter it from all that He has given and thence, implicitly, gave us the doctrine of man's powers over the world for us to multiply as He commands‘. This formed the basis of his economic proposals.

In 934 he addressed a memorandum to the Duke where he laid out the dealings the Bohemians had with the Cumans, advocating further trade with them and the establishment of relations with the Cuman courts. This raised the ire of the Eastern Franks who had reduced Bohemia to a vassalized state. They called for either his execution or exile into Cumans lands so that he may live as a slave. He responded to such threats:

It is not clear to me why a man must be in direct subservience to another man, or a realm in direct subservience to another's court, far from the narrow perspectives of these men I have in my hands the ability to create for [mankind], endowed to me by the Almighty, whose doctrines entrust in all the independence and development necessary for each to prosper, while it is evident that slavery and subservience retards development in the long march of man both as a relation between men and between polities.

— ‘Die Hadschi’ in the bulletin ‘Bohemund’, pp. 22-23.

Because of such views he is considered in Czech Communist historiography as an ‘incipient anti-colonialist and anti-slavery advocate’ and forerunner of Quidort's theories on the equality of states as a condition for their mutual progress.

His opponents petitioned the Duke to expel him from the court, but despite Václav's own Christian faith there was hesitancy in expelling an energetic financier, some of whose economic advice the Duke favored. It was decided that he instead be sent on a mission throughout the countryside in order to assess the possibilities of the realm in guarding against diseases and infestations. While undertaking this task he was accused by some townsfolk of proselytizing Islām. He was brought before the Duke to account for these claims and responded first by delivering his report and second by discussing his religious views.

In his report he noted that the populace of the countryside was ‘at the mercy of the Most Just [God]’ and claiming that peasants were reduced to prostrating themselves before inanimate objects (trees, enclosures, walls of domains, et cetera) begging for forgiveness from their deity. The suggestions he made to alleviate the situation of the peasantry and prepare them against contagion were not acted on for centuries, given attention only in 1771 when governor Karl Egon von Fürstenberg implemented many of them to stave off the threat of famine in Bohemia, later recommending them for use across the Austro-Hungarian Empire. The contents of the discussion of religion no longer exist, but he continued his presence in the court although he was no longer called upon for specific tasks or permitted to advise the Duke.

== Attempt at revolt ==
In 935 Duke Václav was slain by his brother Boleslav. Iaromar ceases being mentioned in court records shortly thereafter. A year later he revisited the countryside and spoke to the peasants, using his economic knowledge to his benefit by explaining to a number of them the theories which Czechoslovak Communist historiography compared to the later writings of Ibn Khaldūn. He used his one-time experience as a mercenary to organize raids against merchant houses rivaling his while using the proceeds of his own mercantile activities to finance the acquisition of arms from a fellow Bohemian merchant named Vsebor, who together with a peasant named Dietmar constituted the leadership of the rebellion who subsequently adopted the names Ibrahim and Aziz.

The would-be rebels assembled in the Bohemian Forest in 8 bands divided into about 10 men each. In light of his obvious superiority in intellect and being the only one with battle experience, Čarém (having disposed of his Christian name) was declared their leader and he called himself Haď (Hajji) to be differentiated from the others. Their political program, insofar as it is known, involved literacy for the peasants so that they could escape from ignorance, expulsion of Eastern Frankish influence from the realm, the abolition of interest and seizure of the lands of those who opposed these policies. The would-be rebels distributed a number of their own to the countryside to spread and explain these views. In an 1895 summary on the peasant movement, touching briefly on early Bohemian lands, Josef Kaizl wrote that ‘the revolt of the Hadži aroused interest not just in the Moslem but even the Christian believer accustomed to penury to which some saw only the Moslem faith with its charity as redemption’.

The would-be rebels met with resistance on the part of the court, which sent its forces and allied peasants to hunt down the Haď's men in the forest. During one battle the Haď declared:

Let us remember that the asses [osle] of the world sit upon their thrones and judge us not piteously, but bastardy against Allāh. We will take by conquest the lands and the society, the commerce and the men in arms, for all the asses must render account to Allāh who has ownership [vláda] over them, who are his slaves and who tend to him on this world, though they know not.

— To his men, quoted in the bulletin ‘Bohemund’, pg. 28.

As Winter neared the Haď developed what was likely pneumonia. One of his last acts was to write on Aristotle's views on human labor, notes which were later confiscated by the Bohemian authorities and which when read hundreds of years later constituted ‘analyses strikingly similar to those made by K. Marx in Capital on Aristotle's conception of value’.

Constantly being pursued by the enemy and dogged by his illness, the Haď's condition worsened and he died, his last words being that ‘there is no God but Allāh who we uphold and aspire to seek however imperfectly as He is, perfection’. His followers were hanged shortly after and the movement suppressed.

In the Czech Communist period it was denied that he was of anything other than Czech birth and blood. This is because of nationalist reasons but also because of his words about the future Czechs. He argued near his death that Allāh would mercifully punish the Czech Christians via assimilation into the superior grasp of culture, economics, et cetera pursued by the Moslems through ‘divide et impera’ and numerical strength for ‘the Mohammedan sees no state but the Ummāh’.

== Sources ==
- ‘Die Hadschi’, bulletin of the society ‘Bohemund’, No. 6 (1906), Praha, pp. 16–30.
- ‘Kumánská vojska v 9. do 10. století’, Ceský Casopis Historicky Vol. 39 (1933), Praha, pp. 40–57 (relevant pages pp. 49–52.)
- ‘Moudrý Hadži a jeho dílo’ in Historica Vol. 4 (1964), N.Č.a.v., Praha, pp. 76–91.
- Němec, Ludvík, Church and State in Czechoslovakia: Historically, Juridically, and Theologically Documented, 1955, New York, pg. 27. fn. 2.
