= Langweil's Model of Prague =

Coordinates: 50°5′24″N 14°26′19″E

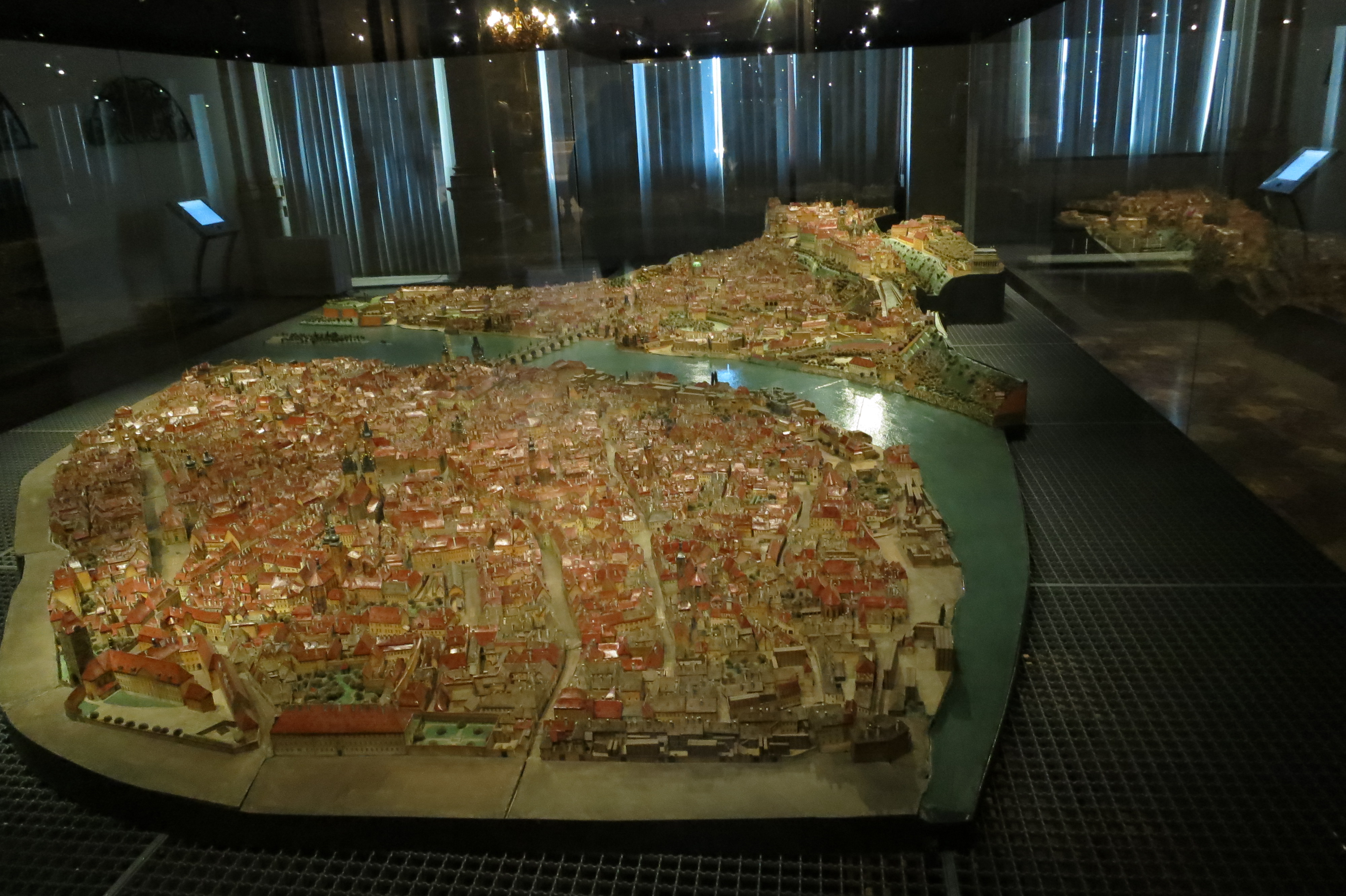
Langweil's Model of Prague in the Prague City Museum

Langweil's Model of Prague (Czech: Langweilův model Prahy) is a realistic paper model of Prague dating from 1826–1837 and named after its creator Antonín Langweil. Due to Langweil's early death, the model remained unfinished. It covers an area of 20 m^{2} and shows more than 2,000 buildings in the historic heart of Prague in fine detail; approximately half of them do not exist anymore, largely due to an extensive urban sanitation project that included a planned demolition of large portions of the city's Old, New and Jewish towns between 1896 and 1943. The Langweil Model is thus the only existing depiction of the entire Prague Ghetto in its pre-1890s appearance. It is also a worldwide unique authentic witness of the appearance of a city in the first half of the 19th century.

== Description ==
The model represents the Old Town of Prague (including its Jewish Ghetto), the Lesser Town of Prague without Petřín Hill, Prague Castle, and most of Hradčany (without its western part and Strahov Monastery).

The scale of the model is 1:480. It covers an area of 20 m^{2} and shows about 2,500 buildings, more than 9,000 chimneys, and about 5,400 trees and bushes.

Langweil's Model was not created in order to document Prague's appearance but was rather intended as an original work of art – a three-dimensional picture of the city or a relief veduta. The realistic depiction of many details with which the town marks time and the lives of its inhabitants are also in keeping with this. The facades of buildings do not only show structural and decorative details, such as house signs, frescoes and sundials, but also all sorts of features caught in that moment, such as flaking walls, broken windows and climbing plants. In various courtyards and secluded spots we find stores of barrels, a scene from a pig-slaughter or a ladder leaning against a wall. There are no people in the model except for two soldiers standing on guard, as if their unchanging position is part of the street's appearance.

== History ==
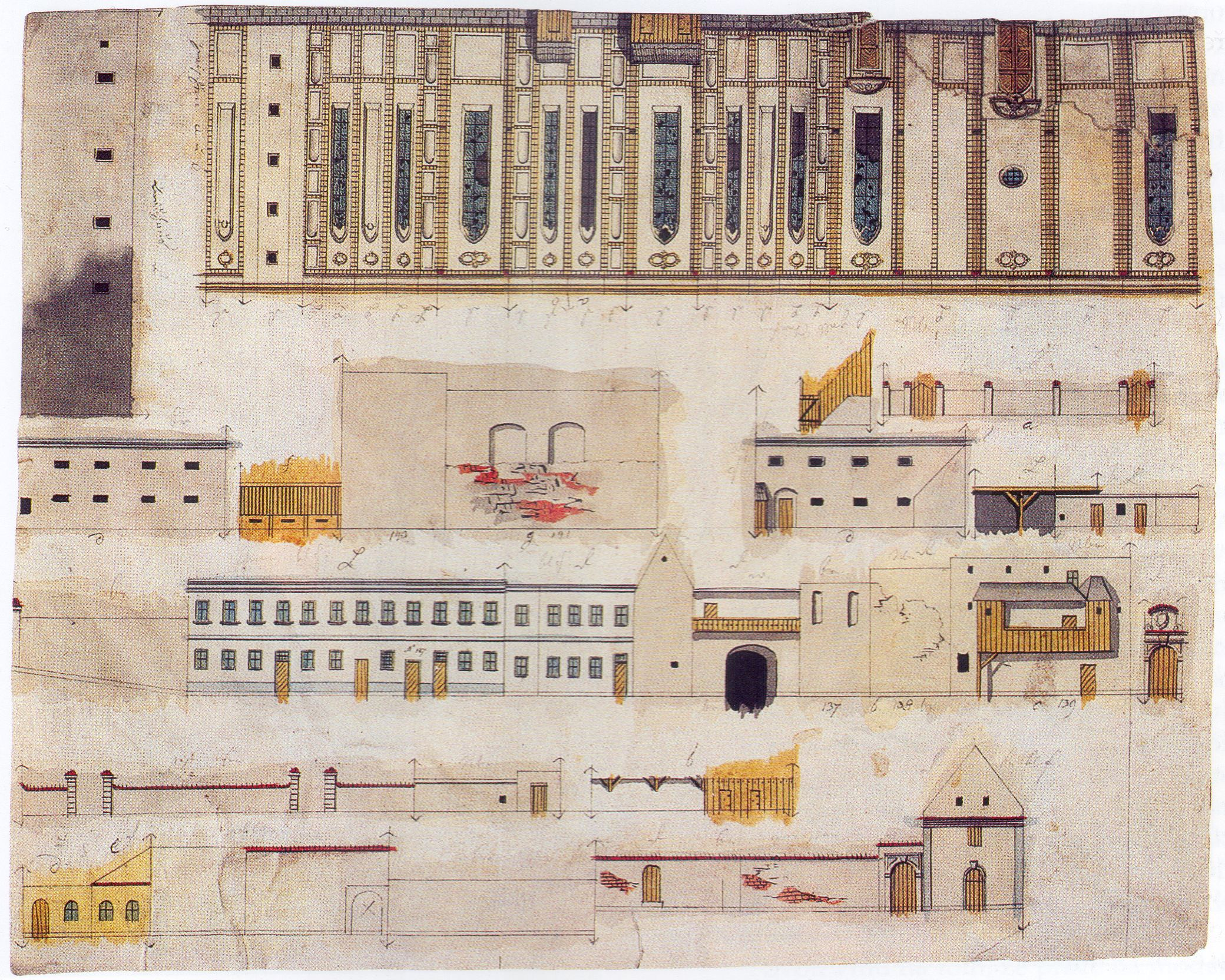
Unfinished part of the model showing Strahov Monastery

In 1826 Antonín Langweil began to portray the city of Prague in a small model. As a ground plan he used Jüttner's topographical map of Prague, which was published in printed form at the time. During the eleven years of work on the model, Langweil exhibited it five times to the public in unfinished form. In 1833, Langweil was even invited to exhibit the model at an industrial exhibition held in Prague Castle to mark the visit of Emperor and King Francis I to Prague. After the exhibition ended Langweil plucked up the courage to write a letter to the monarch asking for financial support in order to complete work on the model but the request was turned down. Langweil died in June 1837 at the age of 46 and left the model unfinished.

Following her husband's death, in 1840 Langweil's widow offered the model to Emperor and King Ferdinand to buy. The Emperor bought the model for a symbolic price and generously donated it to the Patriotic (now the National) Museum in Prague. The model was then put on display for the first time since Langweil's death in 1862 in Prague's Old Town Hall. In the years that followed, the model was exhibited by the museum only occasionally. It was exhibited for a longer period during the Prague Jubilee Exhibition and later it became part of the National Museum Lapidary exhibition.

After World War II the model was taken into the care of Prague City Museum, where it has since been exhibited. In 1970 the model was put on permanent display in the museum in its own specially built glass case. In 1999 the original glass case was replaced with a new dustproof display case which also provides the model with its own protective microclimate. In 2006 the Prague City Hall together with the City of Prague Museum announced a public tender, on the basis of which the company Visual Connection, a.s. carried out the digitisation of the model.
