= Antonín Wiehl =

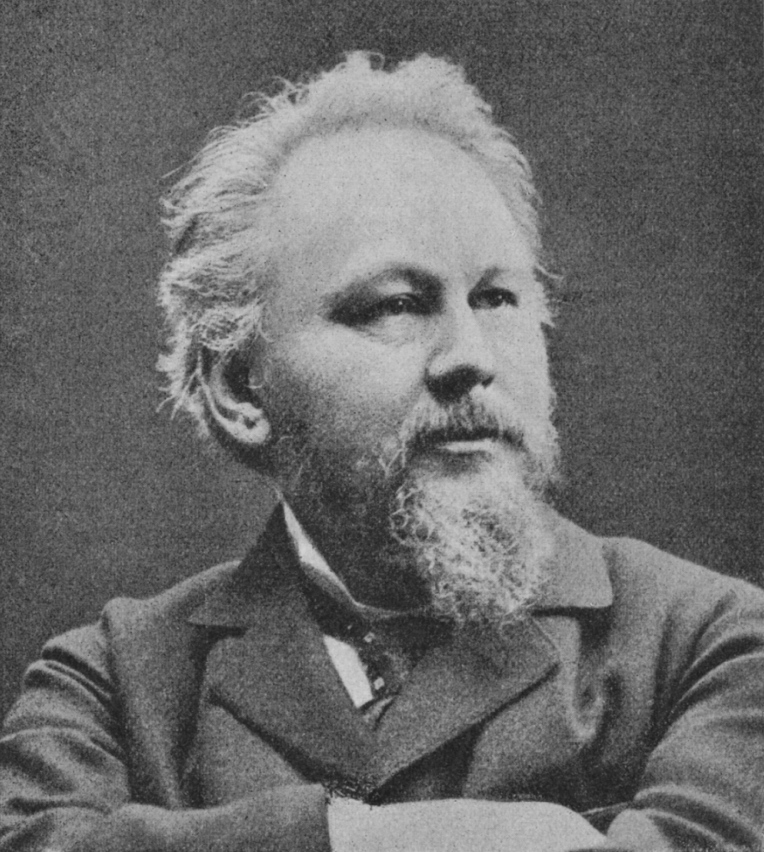
Antonín Wiehl (1880s)

Antonín Wiehl (26 April 1846 – 4 November 1910) was a Czech architect, museum official and patron of the arts. He helped create the first system of historic preservation in Bohemia.

== Biography ==
Antonín Wiehl was born on 26 April 1846 in Plasy, Bohemia, Austrian Empire. His father was an Austrian forestry official, assigned to the estates of Klemens von Metternich. He attended the Realschule in Plzeň, then received his secondary education in Prague. From 1863 to 1868, he was enrolled at the Polytechnic. He began his civil engineering course with Professor Karel Wiesenfeld, who retired in 1864, then continued with Josef Zítek.

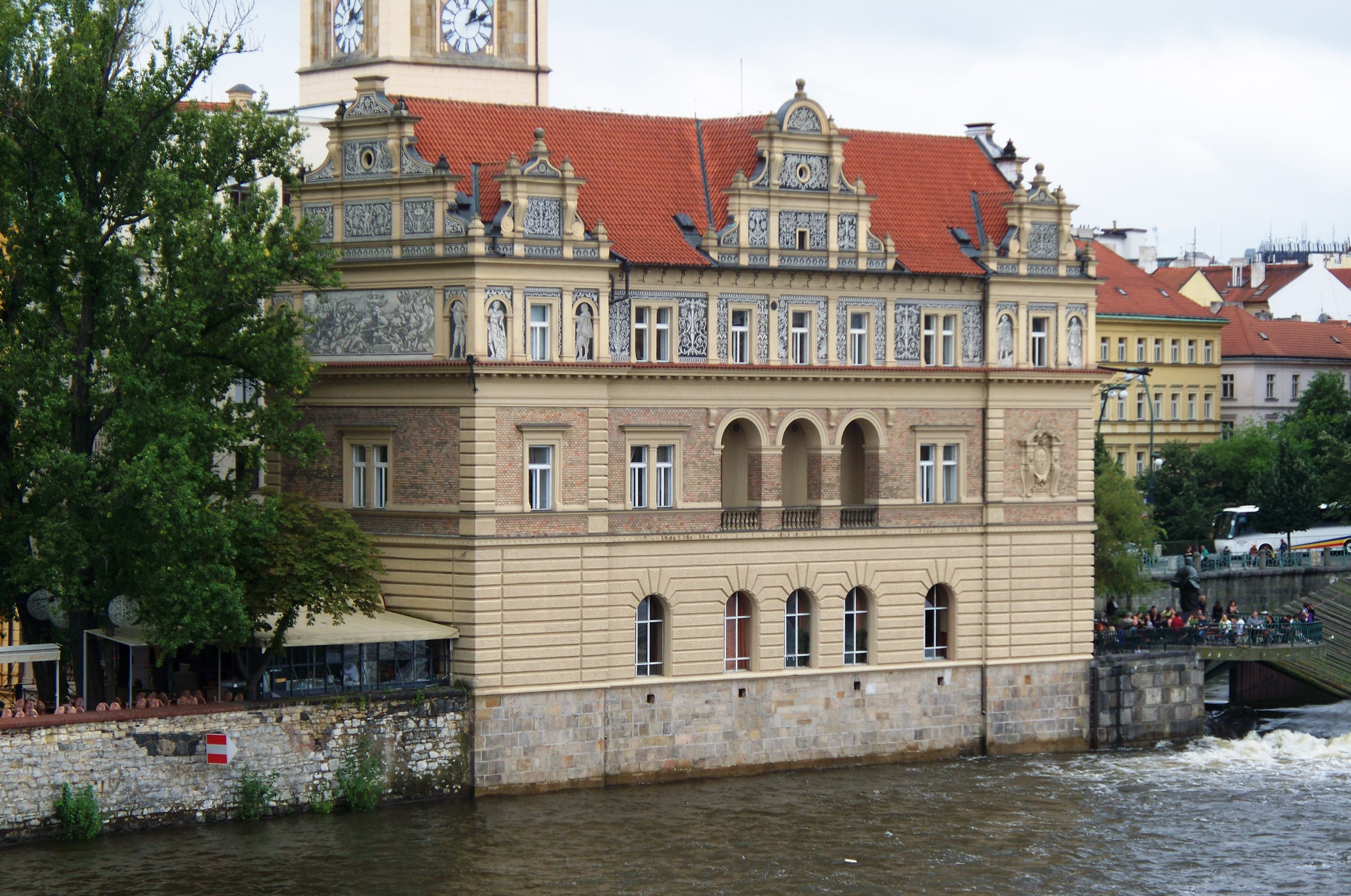
The Prague Water Company building. Since 1936, the Bedřich Smetana Museum

From 1869 to 1870, he was in Slatiňany, working for a construction company owned by the architect, František Schmoranz, who did restorations and was a regional conservator for the Vienna Central Commission that oversaw the preservation of monuments. During Wiehl's time with the company, he gained invaluable experience doing restorative work on a number of churches. Following his employment there, he returned to the Polytechnic and was an assistant to Professor Josef Niklas until 1873. After that, he took an extended study trip to Italy; what would be the first of many such trips throughout his career. Upon returning, he opened his own architectural practice. In 1876, he married Maria Lukasová, from Slaný. Their marriage would remain childless.

From 1881, he was a member of the founding committee for the City of Prague Museum. He also drafted a design for the museum, which was not chosen. In 1883, he became the first Chairman of the Association of Engineers and Architects. He was also a member of the Czech Academy of Sciences and Arts, where he sat on the archaeological commission, and was involved in the study of museology.

In 1891, he made trips to the Bohemian countryside, preparing his folk-motif concepts for a pavilion at the General Land Centennial Exhibition. The architect, Jan Koula, and the writer, Alois Jirásek, worked with him to create the project. Although it received praise from the critics in Prague, visitors from the countryside were less impressed. The writer, Svatopluk Čech, satirized it in one of his novels. From 1892, he focused on designing rental homes and conservation; serving on a committee dedicated to identifying historical architectural elements and transferring them to museums, during a period of redevelopment known as the "Pražská asanace", that resulted in the demolition of many old neighborhoods.

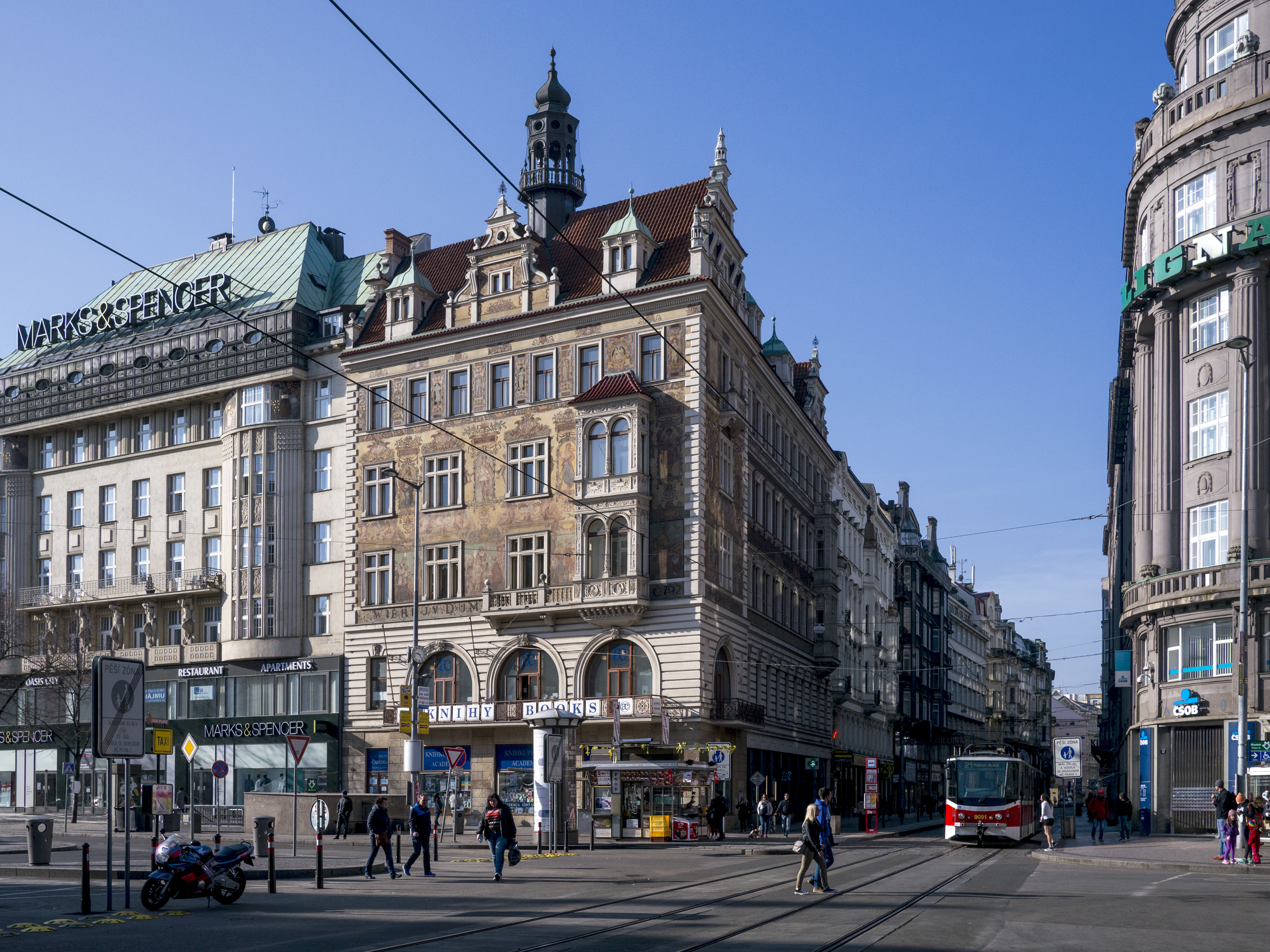
Wiehl House

As he grew older, he became increasingly deaf, and gradually retired from active work; devoting himself instead to gardening, collecting art and antiques, and pursuing his lifelong interests. He also worked on developing ideas for what he called the "Institute of National Economy". His will included numerous endowments for scientific, technical and educational organizations. His home was bequeathed to the Academy of Sciences and Arts. Since 1953, they have used it for their bookstore and publishing division, Academia. He also donated some of his property for the establishment of his proposed Institute. His art collection, books and photographs were given to various museums.

He died on 4 November 1910 in Prague. He is buried in a tomb of his own design at Vyšehrad Cemetery. His sculptural models and sketches were donated to the National Museum by his widow Maria.

== Sources ==
- Kateřina Boháčová, "Antonín Wiehl a jeho pražské novorenesanční stavby" (Antonín Wiehl and his neo-renaissance buildings in Prague), in: Stavba, Vol.18, #3, 2011, pp. 69 - 71 ISSN 1210-9568
- Irena Bukačová, Antonín Wiehl, City of PLasy, 2010, ISBN 978-80-254-8282-7
- Milan Kašpar, Alena Michálková, "Architekt Antonín Wiehl, tvůrce a představitel české neorenesance (1846–1910)" (Architect Antonín Wiehl, creator and representative of the Czech Neo-Renaissance) @ Stavebnictvi3000
- Markéta Kudláčová, "Architekt souladu: Antonín Wiehl a jeho cesta k české renesanci" (Antonín Wiehl and his journey to the Czech Renaissance) @ Dějiny a současnost
- Pavel Vlček, Věra Naňková; Vítovský, "Antonín Wiehl", In: Encyklopedie architektů, stavitelů, zedníků a kameníků v Čechách, Jaroslav Havel, Běla Trpišovská (Eds.), Academia, 2004 pp. 712-713 ISBN 80-200-0969-8
- Jindřich Vybírla. "Česká versus italská neorenesanãní vila: Antonín Wiehl, Antonín Barvitius a jejich mecenáši" ("Czech" versus "Italian" Neo-Renaissance villa. Antonín Wiehl, Antonín Barvitius and their patrons), in Zprávy památkové péče, Vol.74, #3, pp.83-90 (Online)
- Zdeněk Wirth, Antonín Wiehl a česká renesance (Antonín Wiehl and the Czech Renaissance), Jan Štenc, 1921
