= Myslkovice =

- Municipality
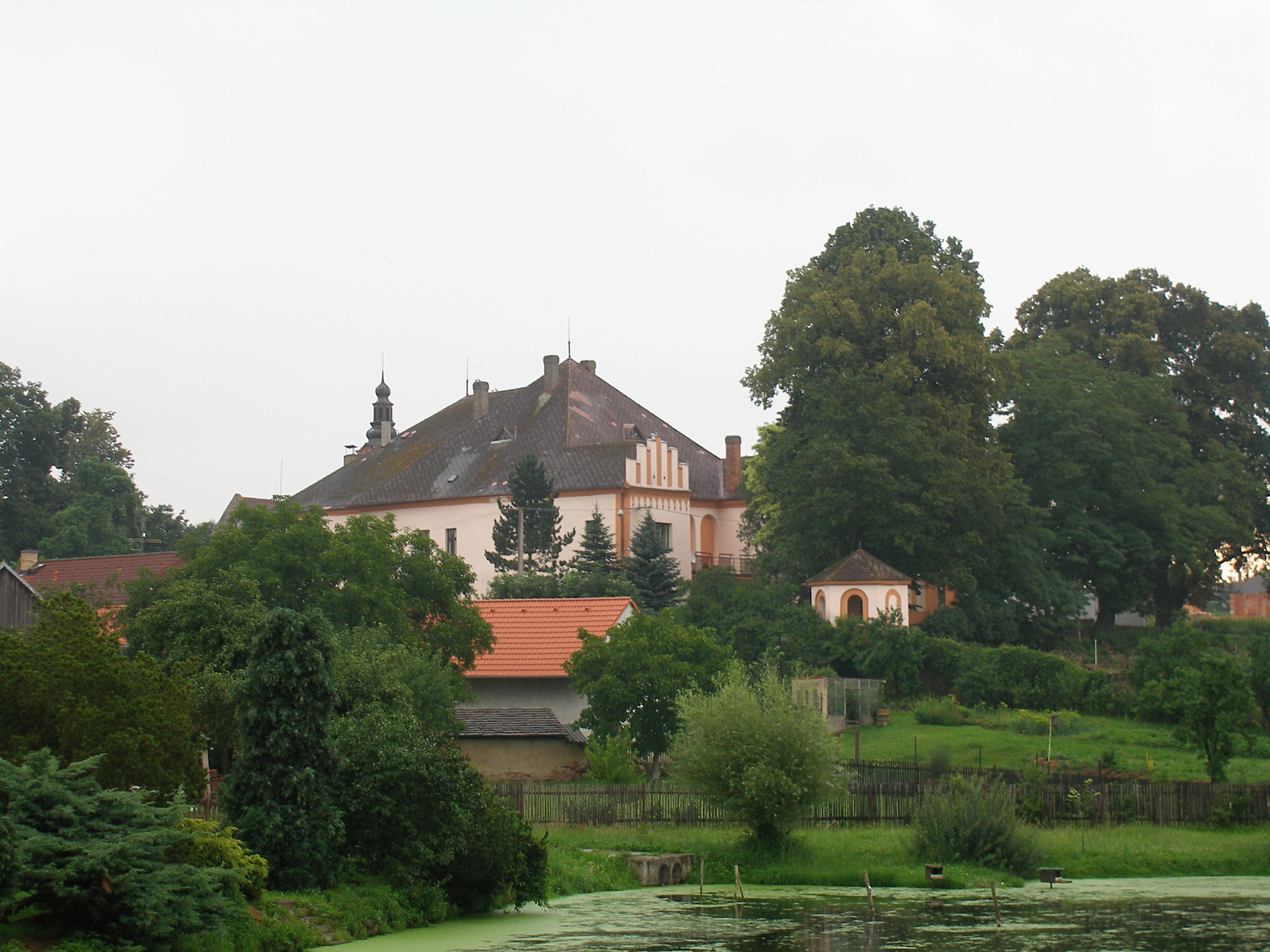
- Myslkovice Castle

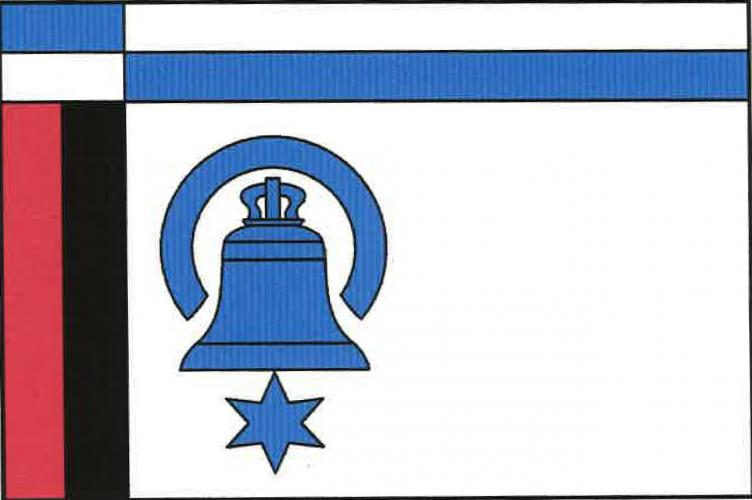
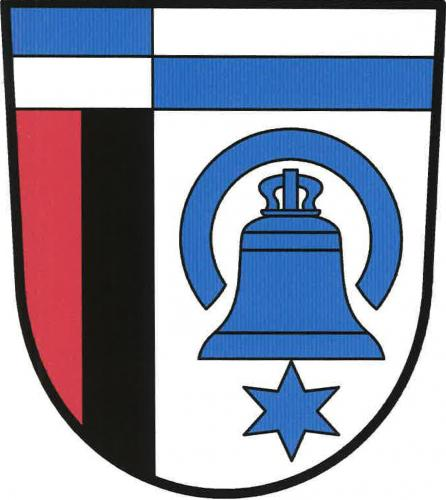
- Flag Coat of arms

- Location in the Czech Republic
- Coordinates: 49°17′57″N 14°44′44″E
- Country: Czech Republic
- Region: South Bohemian
- District: Tábor
- First mentioned: 1367

Area
  - Total: 4.88 km^{2} (1.88 sq mi)
- Elevation: 450 m (1,480 ft)

Population (2026-01-01)
  - Total: 440
  - Density: 90/km^{2} (230/sq mi)
- Time zone: UTC+1 (CET)
  - Summer (DST): UTC+2 (CEST)
- Postal codes: 391 16
- Website: www.myslkovice.cz

Myslkovice (German: Miskowitz) is a municipality and village in Tábor District in the South Bohemian Region of the Czech Republic. It has about 400 inhabitants.

Myslkovice is located approximately 15 kilometres (9 mi) south-east of Tábor, 41 km (25 mi) north-east of České Budějovice, and 91 km (57 mi) south of Prague.

== Demographics ==
Historical population
Year	Pop.	±%
1869	824	—
1880	710	−13.8%
1890	608	−14.4%
1900	631	+3.8%
1910	594	−5.9%
1921	577	−2.9%
1930	545	−5.5%
1950	432	−20.7%
1961	463	+7.2%
1970	440	−5.0%
1980	378	−14.1%
1991	367	−2.9%
2001	343	−6.5%
2011	376	+9.6%
2021	408	+8.5%
Source: Censuses

== Notable people ==
- Josef Kaizl (1854–1901), economist and politician; lived and died here
