= Václav Vondrák =

Czech linguist (1859–1925)

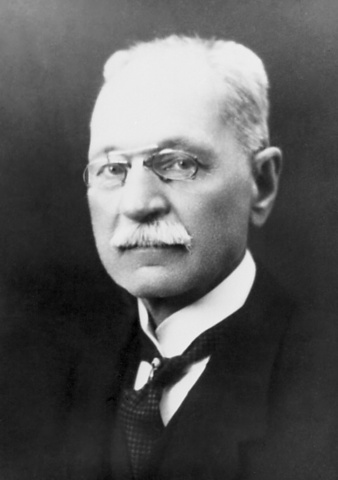

Václav Vondrák (German: Wenzel Vondrák; 22 September 1859 – 13 August 1925) was a Czech Slavist and professor at the universities of Vienna and Brno.

== Life ==
Vondrák was born on 22 September 1859 in Dub, Bohemia, Austrian Empire (modern day Czech Republic).

From 1872 to 1880, Vondrák attended gymnasium in Prachatice and České Budějovice. He studied Slavic philology under Franz Miklosich in Vienna and earned a doctoral degree in 1884. From 1881 to 1891 he was emploued as a teacher by assorted members of the aristocracy, then in 1893 attained habilitation in Slavic languages and literature in Vienna. He became a professor extraordinarius at the Vienna University in 1903. In 1919, he was appointed to professor at the Brno University (today Masaryk University).

Vondráks research contributions lie in the fields of Old Church Slavonic and comparative Slavistics, particularly grammar.

He died on 13 August 1925 in Brno, Czechoslovakia.

== Selected works ==
A full bibliography is available in Časopis pro moderní filologii 12(1) and Slavia 4(3).

- Zur Kritik der altslovenischen Denkmale, Sitzungsberichte d. phil.-hist. Classe d. kaiserl. Akad. d. Wissenschaften, Vienna 1886. Separatabdruck, Vienna 1889 (Google Books)
- Altslovenische Studien, Vienna 1890 (Google Books)
- Ueber einige orthographische und lexikalische Eigentümlichkeiten des Codex Suprasliensis, Vienna 1891.
- Zur Würdigung der altslovenischen Wenzelslegende und der Legende vom heil. Prokop, XIII. Abhandlung in: Sitzungsberichte der philosophisch-historischen Classe der kaiserlichen Akademie der Wissenschaften. Hundertsiebenundzwanzigster Band, Vienna 1892 (Google Books)
- Die Spuren der altkirchenslavischen Evangelienübersetzung in der altböhmischen Literatur, Vienna 1893 (Google Books)
- Glagolita Clozův, Otto, Prague 1893.
- Studie z oboru církevněslovanského písemnictví (Studies Old Church Slavonic Literature), Rozpravy české akademie, Prague 1903.
- O mluvě Jana exarcha bulharského (The Language of Jan the Bulgarian Exarch), Prague 1896.
- Altkirchenslavische Grammatik, Berlin 1900, 1912^{2}.
- O původu kijevských listů a pražských zlomků a o bohemismech v starších církevněslovanských památkách vůbec (The Origin of the Kiev Folia and Prague Fragments), Prague 1904.
- Novější práce o činnosti slovanských apoštolů svatých Cyrilla a Methodia (New Works on the Activities of the Holy Slavic Apostles Cyril and Methodius), "ČČM" 1897.
- Zur Frage nach der Herkunft des glagolitischen Alphabets, Archiv für slavische Philologie 18, 19.
- Vergleichende Slavische Grammatik, Göttingen, I, 1906, II, 1908; I, 1924^{2}.
- Zu den Nasalen im Slavischen. Bezzenbergers Beiträge 29.
- Slavische Akzent- und Quantitätsstudien. Bezzenbergers Beiträge 30.
- Zur Liquidametathese im Slavischen. Archiv f. slav. Philol. 25.
- O genitivech na u ve staré češtině (Genitives Ending with -u in Old Czech), Listy filologické a paedagogické 12, 1885 (Google Books)
- O koncovkách praes. sg. 1. -ím a -ám v češtině (The First-Person Present Singular Endings -ím and -ám in Czech), Listy filol. 13.
- Kremsmünsterská legenda o 10.000 rytířích (The Kremsmünster Legend of 10,000 Knights), Listy filol. 16.
- Ueber die Lokalendungen -ě und -u der ъ- und о-Stämme im Altböhmischen, Archiv f. slav. Philol. 1886.
- Ueber die persönlichen Schimpfwörter im Böhmischen, Archiv f. slav. Philol. 1890.
- Frisinské památky, jich vznik a význam v slovanském písemnictví (The Freising Manuscripts, Their Origin and Significance in Slavic Literature), Prague 1896.
- Vokabulář klasické staroslověnštiny (Dictionary of Classic Old Slavonic, with Bartoň, Josef), KLP, Prague 2003.
