= Dub (Prachatice District) =

- Market town
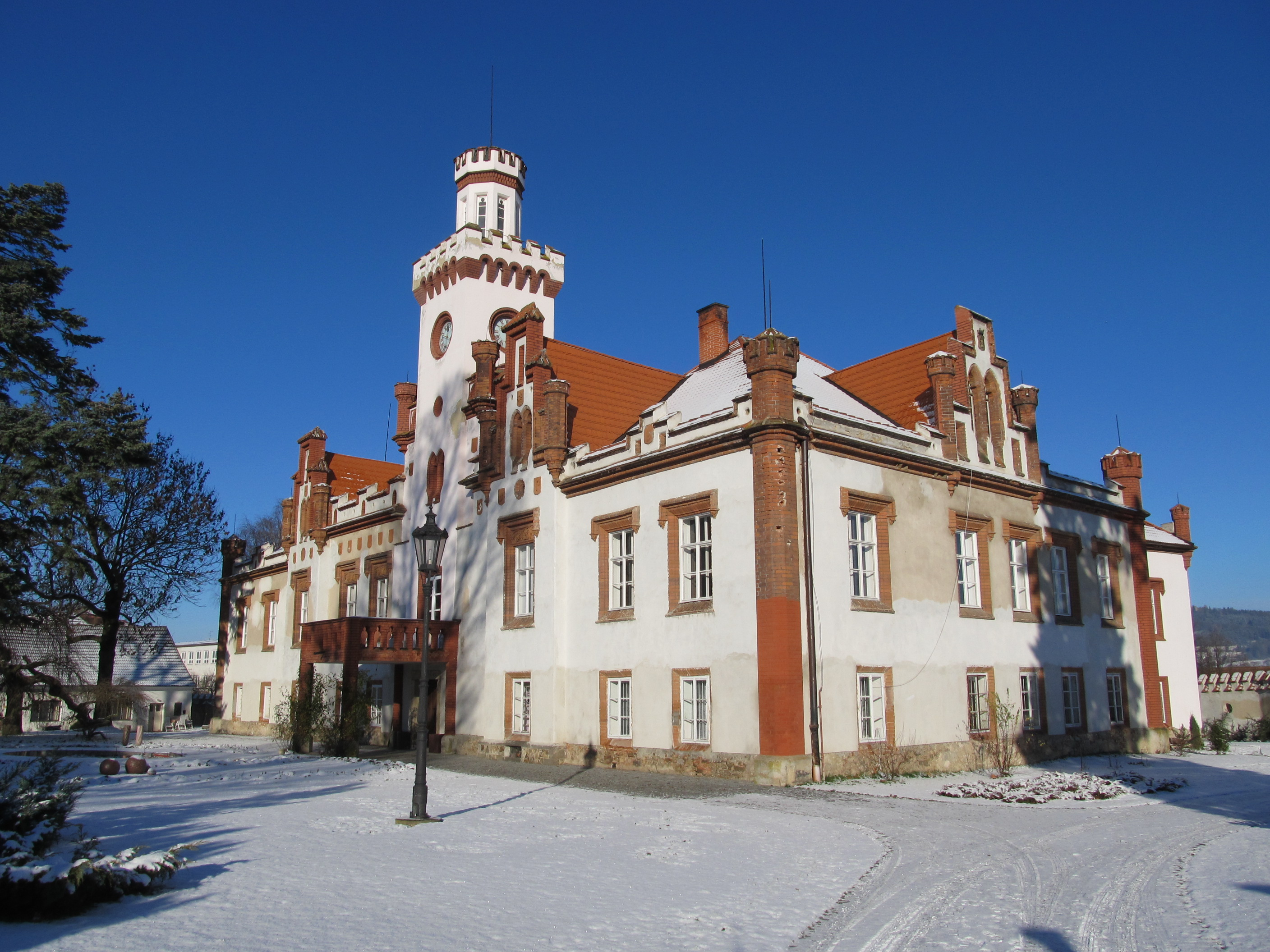
- Dub Castle

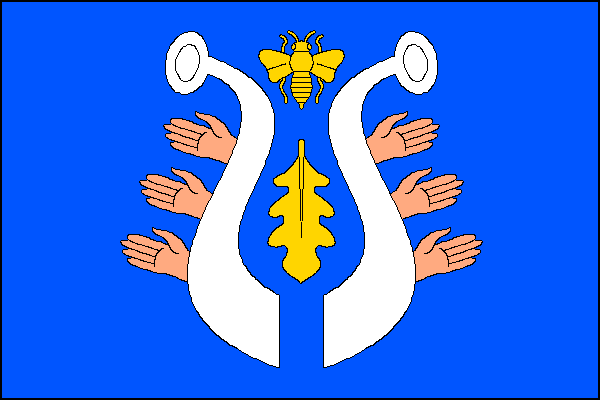
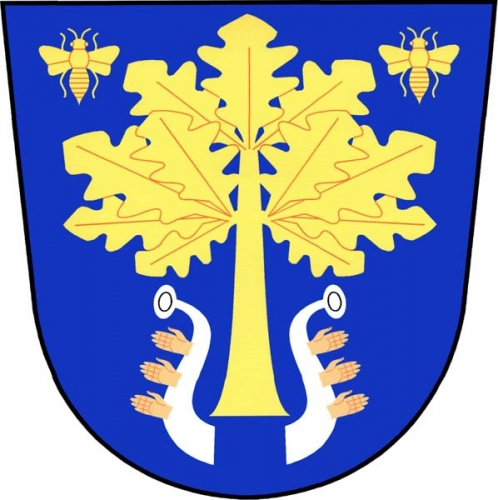
- Flag Coat of arms

- Location in the Czech Republic
- Coordinates: 49°6′30″N 14°0′43″E
- Country: Czech Republic
- Region: South Bohemian
- District: Prachatice
- First mentioned: 1274

Area
  - Total: 14.52 km^{2} (5.61 sq mi)
- Elevation: 474 m (1,555 ft)

Population (2026-01-01)
  - Total: 425
  - Density: 29.3/km^{2} (75.8/sq mi)
- Time zone: UTC+1 (CET)
  - Summer (DST): UTC+2 (CEST)
- Postal code: 384 22
- Website: www.dubuprachatic.cz

Dub (Czech pronunciation: [ˈdup]) is a market town in Prachatice District in the South Bohemian Region of the Czech Republic. It has about 400 inhabitants.

== Administrative division ==
Dub consists of five municipal parts (in brackets population according to the 2021 census):

- Dub (269)
- Borčice (8)
- Dubská Lhota (48)
- Dvorec (10)
- Javornice (41)

== Etymology ==
The name literally means 'oak' in Czech. The settlement was probably founded near some notable oak.

== Geography ==
Dub is located about 10 kilometres (6 mi) north of Prachatice and 36 km (22 mi) northwest of České Budějovice. It lies in the Bohemian Forest Foothills. The highest point is the hill Spálená at 595 m (1,952 ft) above sea level. The stream Dubský potok flows through the market town. The fishpond Dubský rybník is built on this stream.

== History ==
The first written mention of Dub is from 1274. In 1869, Dub was promoted to a market town by Emperor Franz Joseph I.

== Demographics ==
Historical population

Year	Pop.	±%
1869	1,191	—
1880	1,100	−7.6%
1890	1,053	−4.3%
1900	1,035	−1.7%
1910	1,035	+0.0%

Year	Pop.	±%
1921	1,039	+0.4%
1930	866	−16.7%
1950	563	−35.0%
1961	522	−7.3%
1970	454	−13.0%

Year	Pop.	±%
1980	435	−4.2%
1991	382	−12.2%
2001	398	+4.2%
2011	395	−0.8%
2021	376	−4.8%

Source: Censuses

== Transport ==
There are no railways or major roads passing through the municipality.

== Sights ==
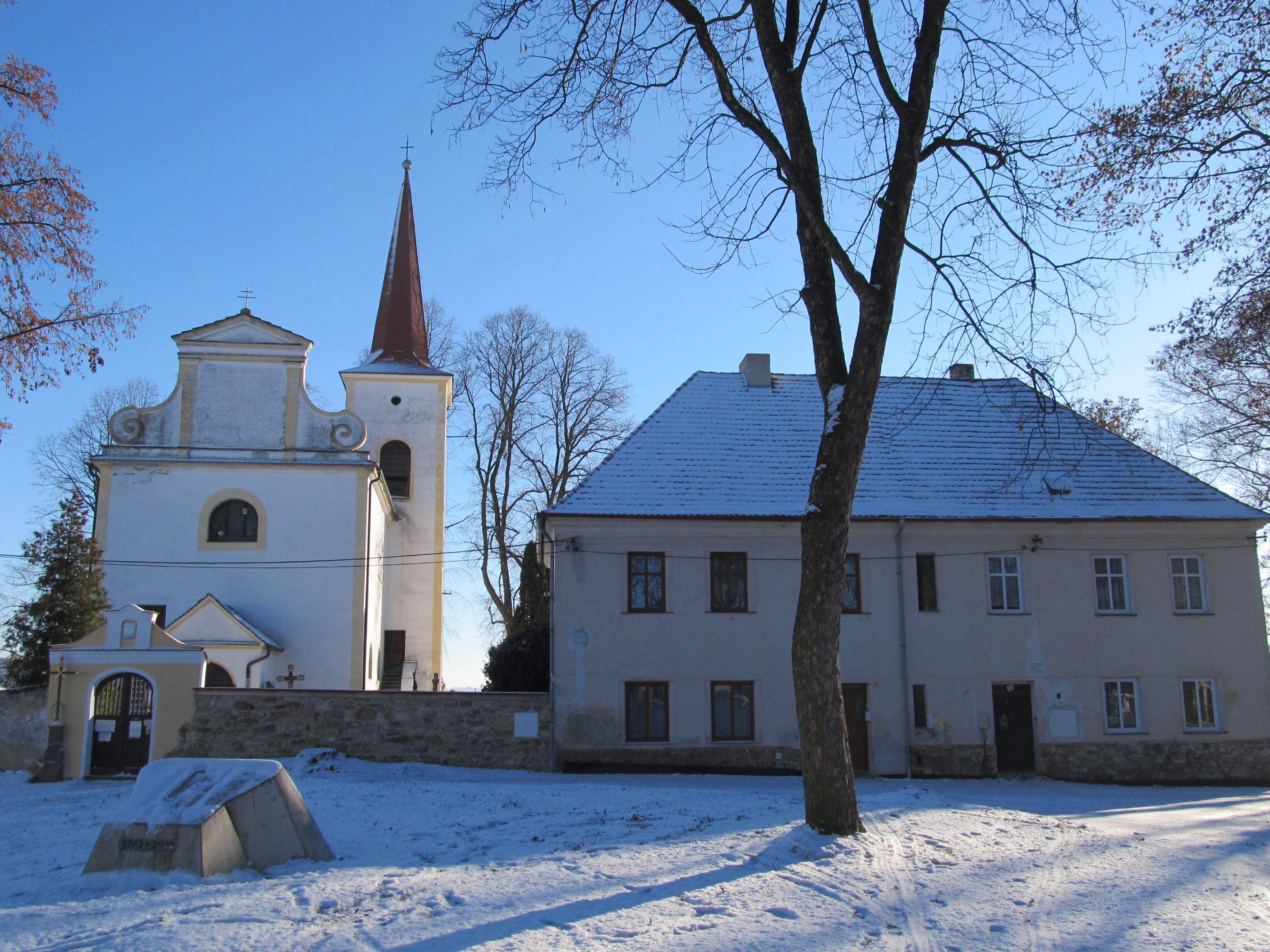
Church of The Mission of the Saint Apostles and rectory

Among the main landmarks of Dub are the local church and the Dub Castle. The Church of The Mission of the Saint Apostles was built in the late Baroque style.

The Dub Castle was built in the neo-Gothic style in 1854–1860 on the site of a medieval fortress, according to the design by Josef Niklas. Next to the castle is a landscape park from the second half of the 19th century.

== Notable people ==
- Václav Vondrák (1859–1925), slavist and philologist
