= Antonín Langweil =

Czech lithographer, librarian, painter and model maker

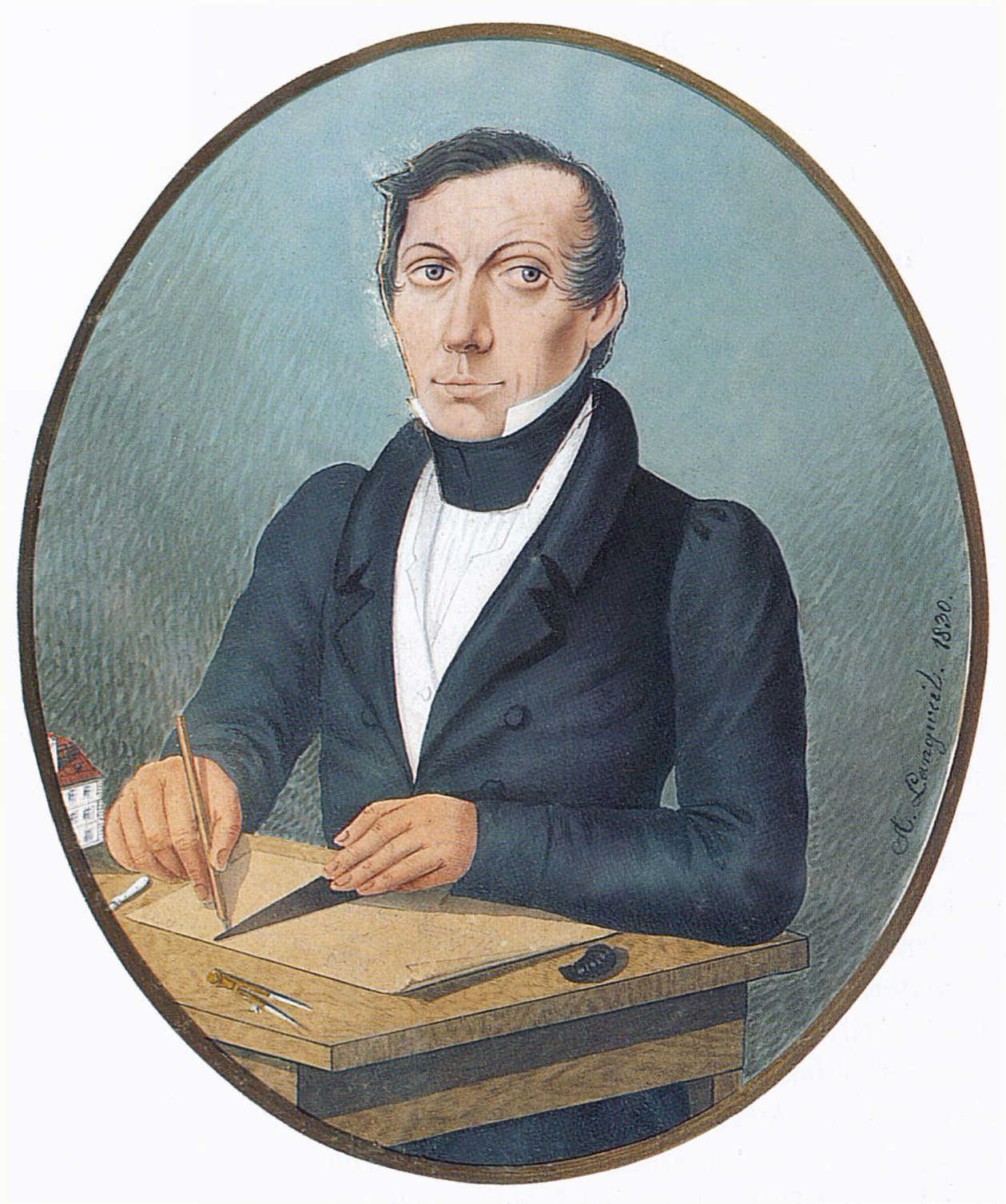
Self-portrait of Antonín Langweil, 1830

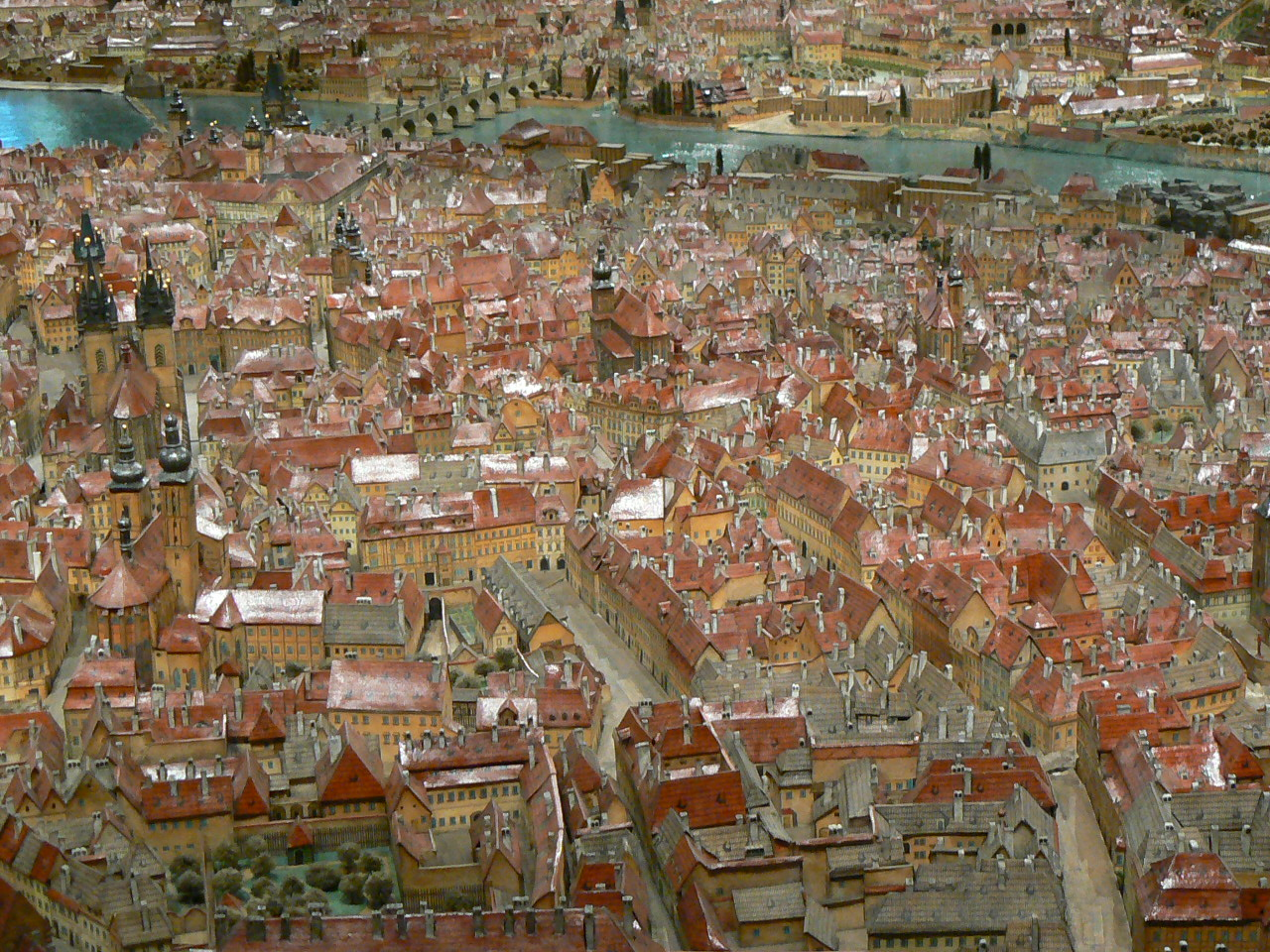
Langweil's model of Prague

Antonín Langweil (13 June 1791 in Postoloprty – 11 June 1837 in Prague) was a Czech lithographer, librarian, painter and model maker. He created a model of the city of Prague, which is now on display at the City of Prague Museum.
