= Volyně =

- Town
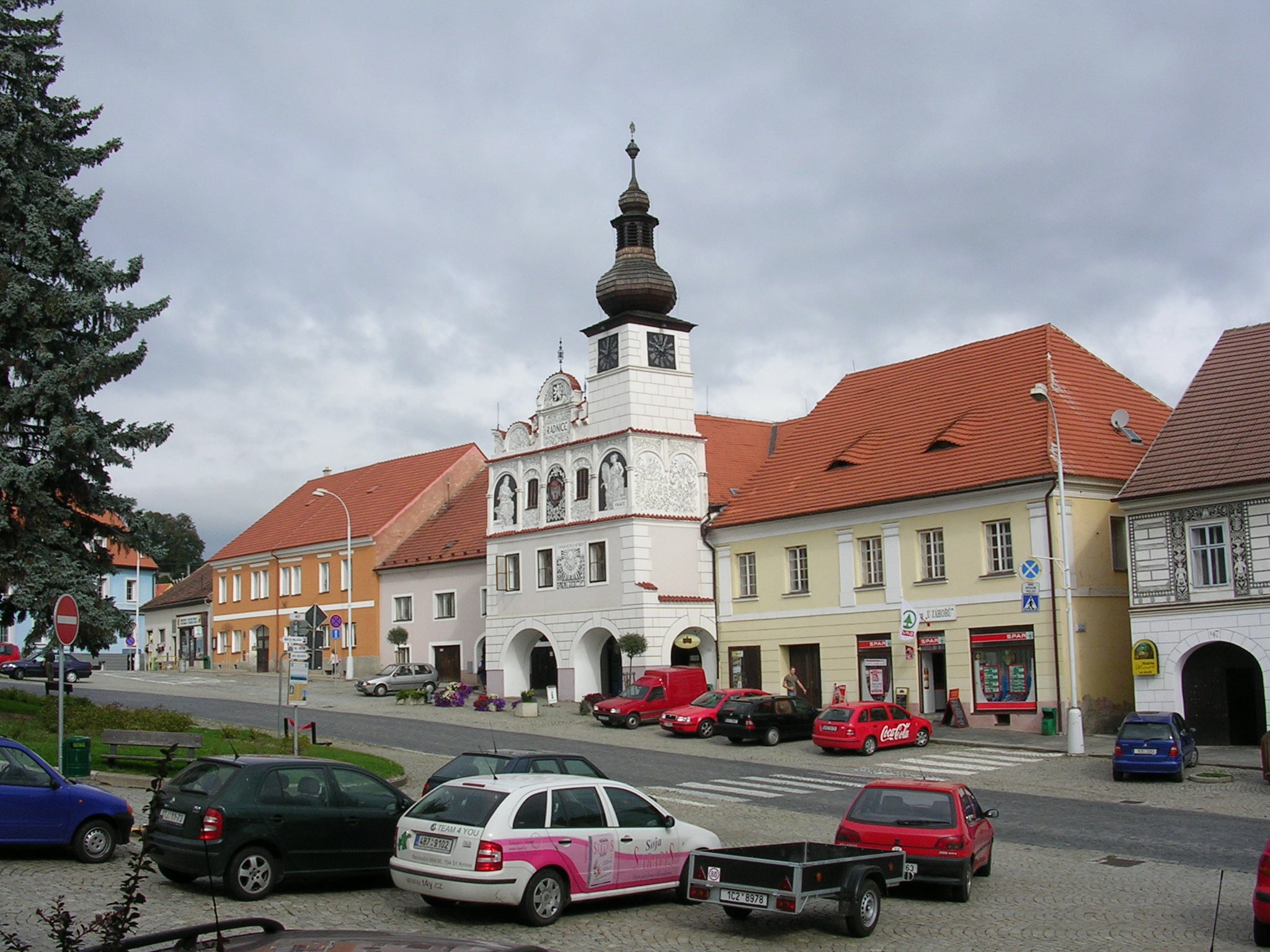
- Town square

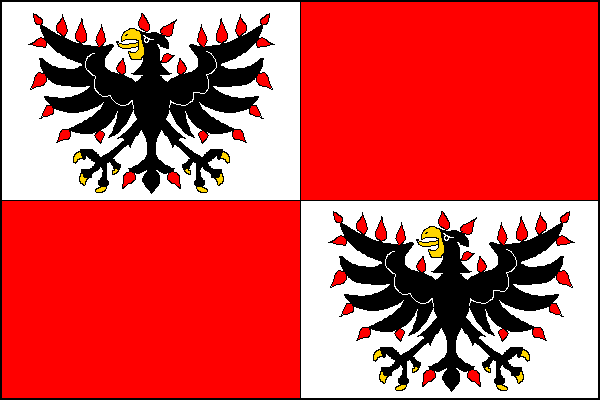
- Flag Coat of arms

- Location in the Czech Republic
- Coordinates: 49°9′57″N 13°53′10″E
- Country: Czech Republic
- Region: South Bohemian
- District: Strakonice
- First mentioned: 1271

Government
  - Mayor: Martin Červený

Area
  - Total: 20.58 km^{2} (7.95 sq mi)
- Elevation: 461 m (1,512 ft)

Population (2026-01-01)
  - Total: 3,033
  - Density: 147.4/km^{2} (381.7/sq mi)
- Time zone: UTC+1 (CET)
  - Summer (DST): UTC+2 (CEST)
- Postal code: 387 01
- Website: www.volyne.eu

Volyně (Czech pronunciation: [ˈvolɪɲɛ]; German: Wolin) is a town in Strakonice District in the South Bohemian Region of the Czech Republic. It has about 3,000 inhabitants. The town is located on the Volyňka River in the Bohemian Forest Foothills.

Volyně became a town in 1299. The historic town centre is well preserved and is protected as an urban monument zone. The main landmark of Volyně is the Renaissance town hall.

== Administrative division ==
Volyně consists of five municipal parts (in brackets population according to the 2021 census):

- Volyně (2,789)
- Černětice (67)
- Račí (19)
- Starov (46)
- Zechovice (85)

Černětice and Račí form an exclave of the municipal territory.

== Etymology ==
The origin of the name Volyně is unknown. There are hypotheses that it was derived from a Slavic tribe that came from the area of today's Ukraine.

== Geography ==
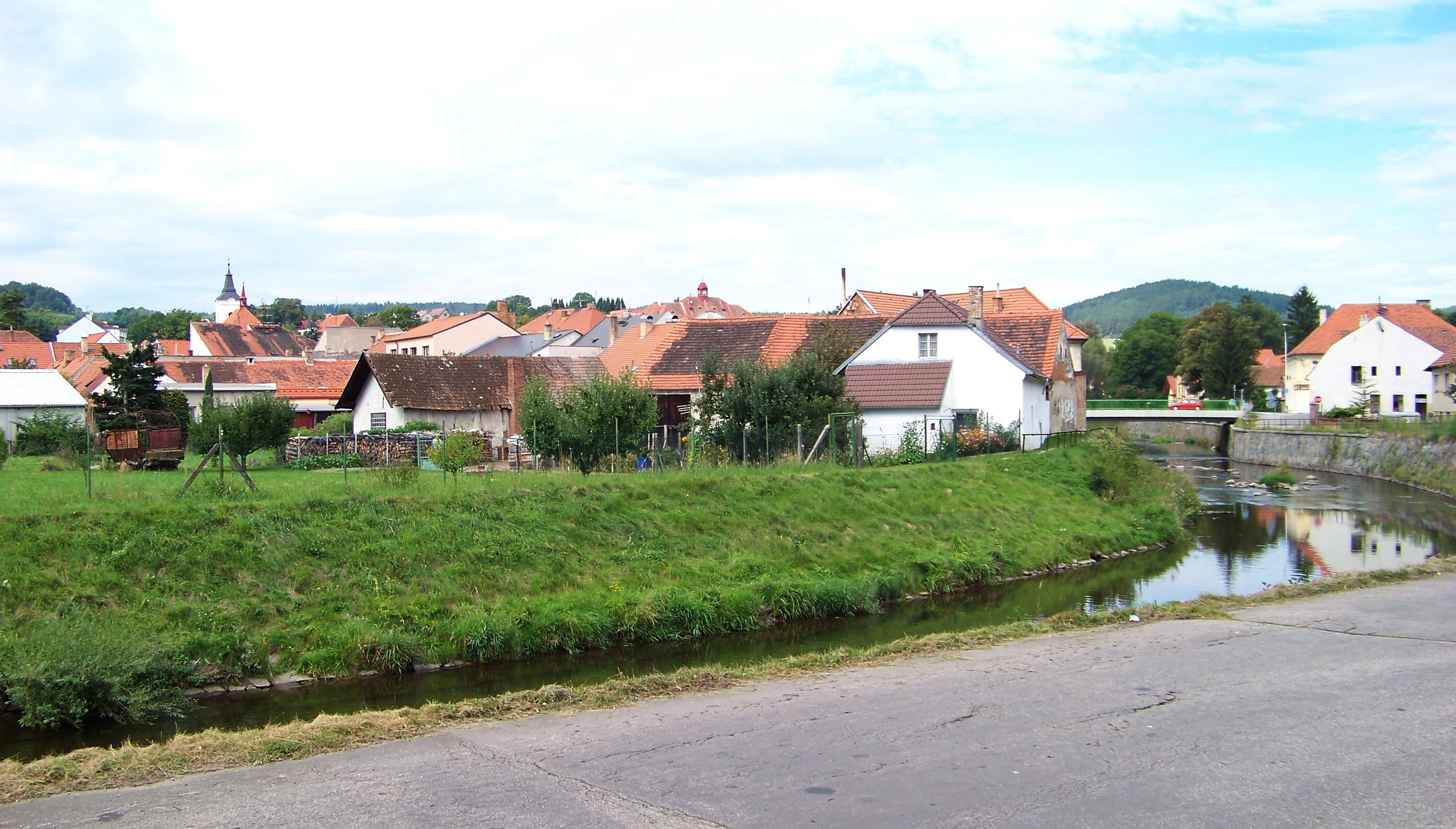
Eastern part of Volyně with the Volyňka

Volyně is located about 10 kilometres (6 mi) south of Strakonice and 46 km (29 mi) northwest of České Budějovice. It lies in the Bohemian Forest Foothills. The highest point is a nameless hill at 769 m (2,523 ft) above sea level. The Volyňka River flows through the town.

== History ==
According to archaeological findings, a Slavic settlement was built on the site of today's town in the 7th century. The first written mention of Volyně is from 1271, when a gord was documented here. In 1299, the settlement was promoted to a town. In 1327, the parish church and town fortifications were completed. In the 15th century, the Volyně waged a long-standing and ultimately victorious dispute with the royal town of Písek over the import of salt and the payment of tolls. The town's prosperity peaked before the Thirty Years' War.

During the war, Volyně suffered from looting, fires and passage of troops. After the war, despite several fires and plague epidemics, the town continued to grow and spread beyond the town walls. The face of the town changed significantly in the 19th century, when the square was paved and new multi-story buildings began to be built.

== Demographics ==
Historical population

Year	Pop.	±%
1869	3,495	—
1880	3,738	+7.0%
1890	3,757	+0.5%
1900	4,018	+6.9%
1910	4,131	+2.8%

Year	Pop.	±%
1921	3,993	−3.3%
1930	3,930	−1.6%
1950	3,349	−14.8%
1961	3,144	−6.1%
1970	2,970	−5.5%

Year	Pop.	±%
1980	3,162	+6.5%
1991	3,251	+2.8%
2001	3,194	−1.8%
2011	2,981	−6.7%
2021	3,006	+0.8%

Source: Censuses

== Education ==
The town is known as a local centre of education. Apart from preschool education and a primary/secondary school, there is the Higher Vocational School and Secondary Industrial School. It was founded in 1864.

== Transport ==
The I/4 road (the section from Strakonice to the Czech–German border in Strážný) runs through the town.

Volyně is located on the railway line Strakonice–Volary.

== Sights ==
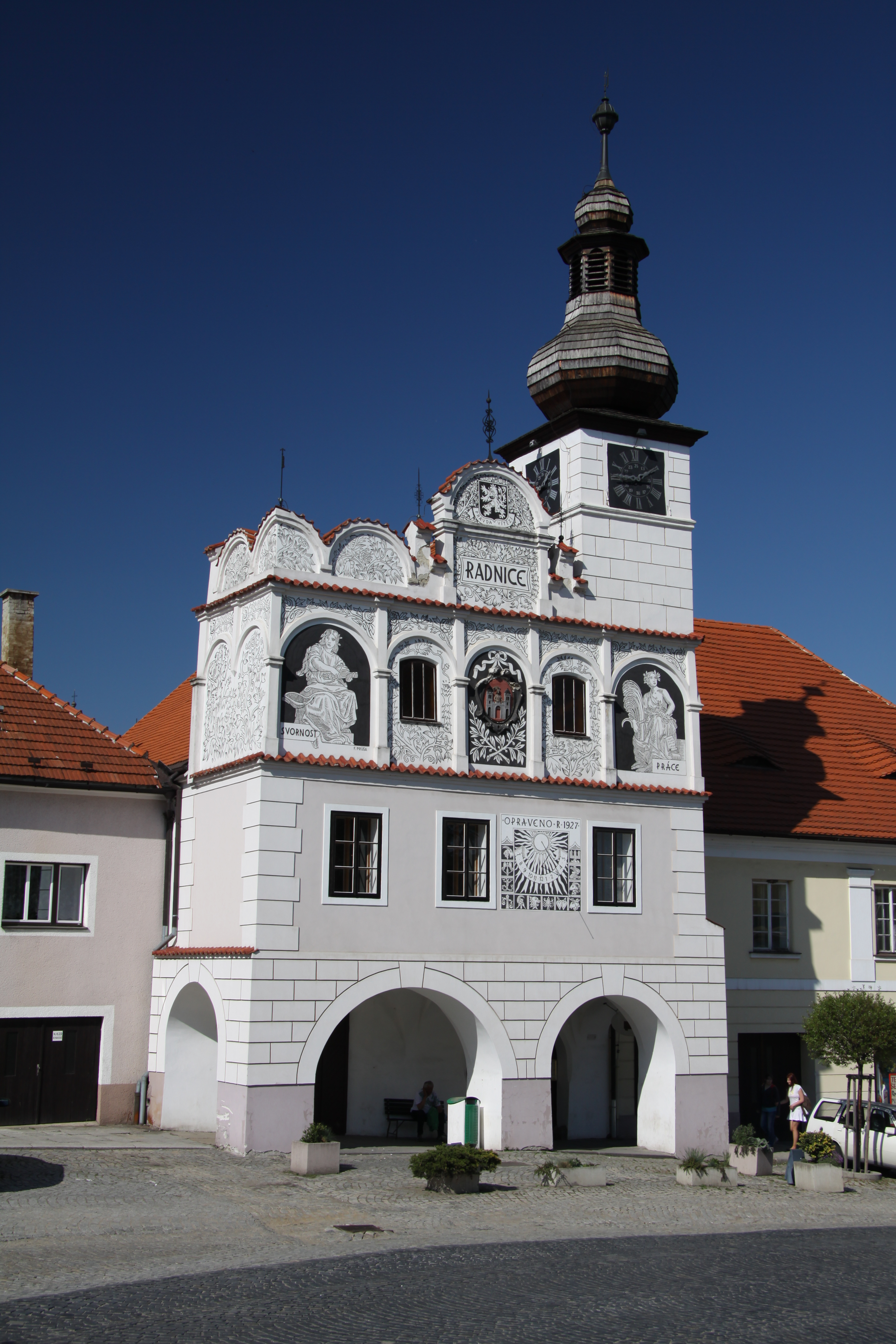
Town hall

The historic town centre is formed by the square Náměstí Svobody and adjacent streets. The main landmark of the square is the Renaissance town hall, built between 1521 and 1529. Other historical buildings include Gothic fortress from the 14th century, Church of All Saints from same period, Church of the Transfiguration, which was built between 1580 and 1618, and Jewish synagogue that dates from 1939. A Marian column located in the middle of the town square dates from 1760.

A landmark is the Chapel of the Holy Guardian Angel, located on a nameless hill above the town. It was built in 1858 on the site of an older chapel from the 17th century. It was designed by Josef Niklas, a native of Volyně.

== Notable people ==
- Josef Niklas (1817–1877), architect
- Josef Kaizl (1854–1901), economist and politician
- Leopold Adler (1861–1948), Austrian businessman
- Jan Rubeš (1920–2009), opera singer and actor

== Twin towns – sister cities ==
Volyně is twinned with:

- Aidenbach, Germany
- Kováčová, Slovakia
