= City of Prague Museum =

Museum of Prague
- Muzeum Prahy
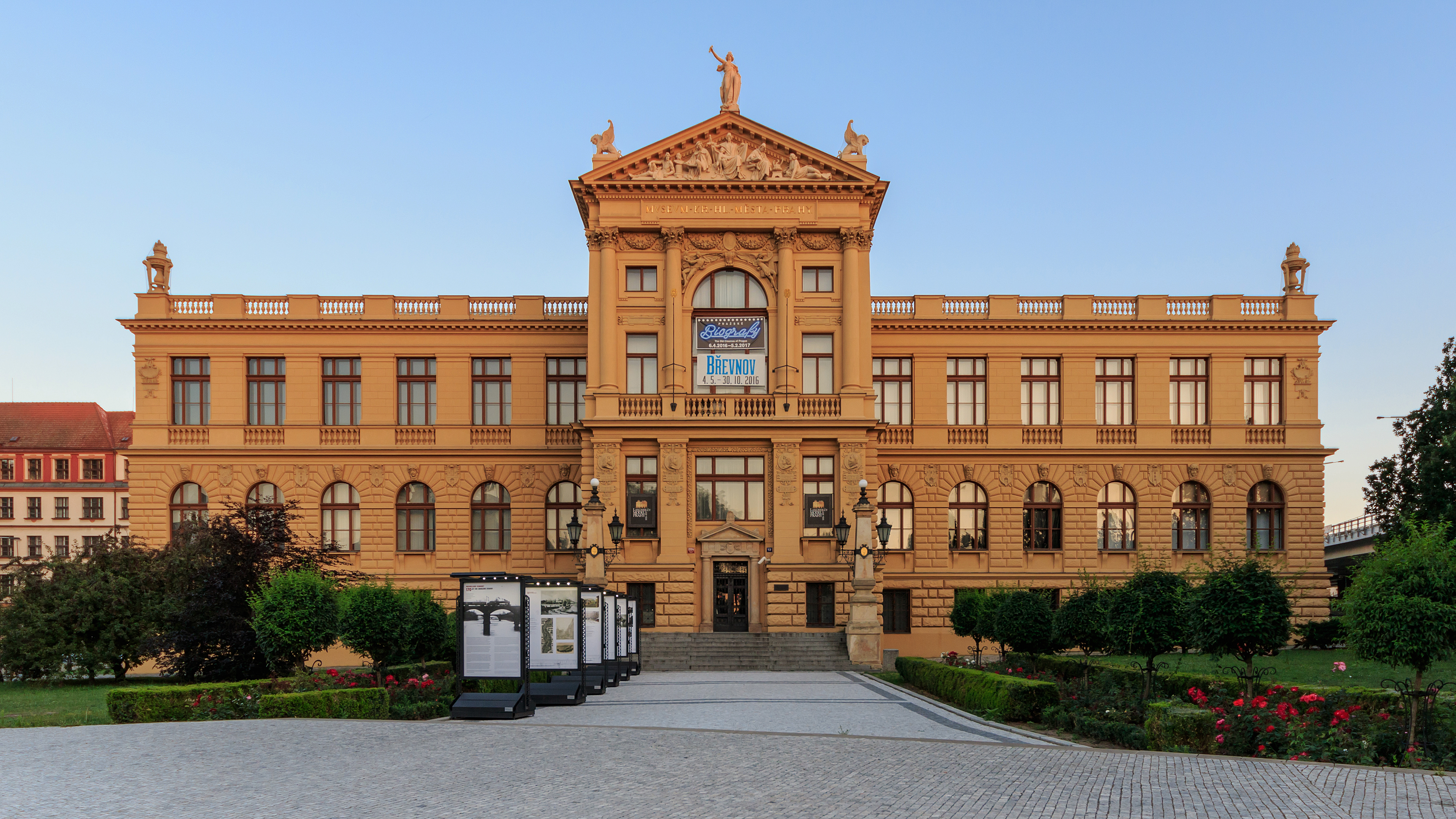
- The museum's main building's front exterior in 2016
- Location: Prague, Czech Republic
- Coordinates: 50.0901°N 14.4386°E
- Type: Museum
- Director: Ivo Macek
- Website: Official website

The Museum of Prague is a museum serving the capital region of Prague. Its responsibilities include the management and presentation of collections documenting Prague’s past, as well as research into the history of the Czech capital and its presentation to the general public. The main museum building is located in Prague at Florenc (Prague 8, Nové Město, Na Poříčí 1554/52).

== History ==
The museum was officially founded on 3 October 1881, when the City Council approved the Statutes of the Permanent Committee of the Museum of Prague, whose main task was to establish a new museum, create a systematic collection and find a suitable building to house the collections and exhibitions.

The main reason for establishing the museum was to prevent the sale and export of antiques abroad and to collect and present to the public exhibits related to the history of Prague and the life of its people.

The first meeting of the Committee took place in the Mayor’s Hall of the Old Town Hall on 23 November 1881 and was attended by many important figures in the cultural and political life of the time. The Committee was chaired by Member of the Prague Assembly Robert Nittinger and further included Emanuel Štěpán Berger (lawyer and collector of antiques); Josef Stanislav Doubek (architect and alderman); Vojta Náprstek (entrepreneur and founder of the industrial museum); Bohuslav Schnirch (sculptor); Hugo Toman (lawyer and art collector); Miroslav Tyrš (aesthetician, art historian and co-founder of the Prague Sokol association); Bedřich Wachsmann (painter and architect); František Ženíšek (painter); and Antonín Baum (architect), who was shortly thereafter replaced by Antonín Wiehl (also an architect).

In 1882 the Prague City Council donated to the Museum Committee a small café pavilion built in 1876 on the site of the original city walls near the St Christopher’s Bastion. In the first half of 1883, the Committee and the newly appointed museum keeper (administrator) installed the first exhibitions, which were opened to the public on 12 May. The oldest museum building was demolished in 1974 to make way for the main arterial road.

The museum’s keeper, Břetislav Jelínek (1843–1926), an amateur archaeologist and collector of antiques, later became the museum’s first director and served in this capacity until 1913. He was succeeded by the art historian František Xaver Harlas and later Antonín Novotný, the author of the well-known and popular “pocket encyclopaedias” of Prague. During World War I, the museum was briefly managed by Václav Vilém Štech. In addition to the aforementioned founding personalities, many other historians, art historians, archaeologists, architects, as well as other men of culture among lawyers and politicians had made significant contributions to the museum and its collections in the service of the Committee until 1939, including František Ekrt (priest and historiographer), Josef Fanta (architect), Josef Václav Frič (lawyer, writer and journalist), Karel Guth (archaeologist and art historian), Karel Chudoba (politician and collector), Josef Koula (architect), Jan Kapras (historian), Vincenc Kramář (art historian), Rudolf Kříženecký (architect and designer), Antonín Matějček (art historian), Josef Mauder (sculptor), Josef Václav Novák (industrialist, collector and art patron), Václav Novotný (historian and professor), Antonín Podlaha (priest, theologian and collector), Albín Stocký (archaeologist), Eduard Šittler (priest and historian), Renáta Tyršová (art historian), Karel Urbánek (historian), Václav Vojtíšek (Prague archivist and professor), Zikmund Winter (historian and writer), Zděněk Wirth (art historian and conservationist), and Karel Židlický (chairman of the Club for Old Prague).

== Main building ==
It was clear from the outset that the café pavilion was too small to house the museum’s collections and unrepresentative of its ambitions, so after much deliberation, it was decided to construct a new building. The original designs were created by the architects Antonín Wiehl and Jan Koula, and the final design was drawn up by Antonín Balšánek. The building in the Renaissance Revival style was built between 1896 and 1898 and was officially opened to the public on 27 September 1900. It is a two-storey building consisting of two symmetrical side wings with a central avant-corps with a tympanum containing a relief (named History with Art, Science and Crafts Creates the Glory of Our Past) by Ladislav Šaloun topped by the sculpture Allegory of Prague by the same artist. The rear facade is also divided by a semi-circular avant-corps. Further decorative elements on the outer shell of the museum building were created by F. Stránský, V. Štaff and F. Hergesell.

Inside the building, there is a central lobby with a staircase, and exhibition halls in the wings. K. Klusáček, K. Liebscher, V. Jansa, V. Amort, L. Wurzel and A. Procházka decorated the interior of the building. The decoration of the museum’s main building includes a number of interesting exhibits from demolished Prague houses from the period of the city’s major redevelopment in the late 19th century, such as the particularly striking painted ceilings from Prague’s Renaissance townhouses (e.g. “U Císařských” on Wenceslas Square or the Egg Market house) and the coffered ceiling from the Pauline Monastery in the Old Town. Some of the rooms are decorated with distinctive stone exhibits from the area of historical Prague, such as tombstones and portals, as well as elements from the Gothic Powder Gate Tower and an authentic vault from an Old Town Square house. The staircase of the main museum building is decorated with a cyclorama by Antonio Sacchetti called View of Prague from the Lesser Town Bridge Tower. Since 1970, a unique model of Prague created by Antonín Langweil in the first half of the 19th century has been exhibited in the building. The detailed 20 sq. metre paper model, with over 2,000 buildings, shows the historic city centre as it looked in 1826–1837.

== Other exhibition buildings ==
In addition to its permanent exhibitions, the museum also offers short-term exhibitions. The Museum of Prague also includes the Podskalí Customs House at Výtoň, the House at the Golden Ring (Týnská 6), Villa Müller (Nad Hradním vodojemem 14), Villa Rothmayer (U páté baterie 50), the Ctěnice Chateau Complex, and the Norbertov Study and Documentation Centre.

The building is protected as a cultural monument.

== See also ==
- List of museums in Prague

== Bibliography ==
- BEČKOVÁ, Kateřina. Svědectví Langweilova modelu Prahy (in Czech). Prague: Nakladatelství Schola ludu – Pragensia in cooperation with Prague City Museum, 1996. 252 pages. ISBN 80-900668-8-7
- HARLAS, František Xaver, Stará Praha, nástin vývoje města a průvodce jeho sbírkami (in Czech). Prague: Lidové nakladatelství, 1911, 210 pages.
- JELÍNEK, Břetislav. Ze zbrojnice Městského musea pražského (in Czech). Prague: Obec pražská, 1913. Available online.
- JINDROVÁ, Jarmila. Muzeum hlavního města Prahy (in Czech). Prague: Olympia, 1970.
- LIŠKA, Antonín, FRAUENTERKA, Miroslav, ŠTIKOVÁ, Eva. Muzeum hlavního města Prahy (in Czech). Prague: Sportovní a turistické nakladatelství, 1957.
- MÍKA, Zdeněk. Muzeum hlavního města Prahy: průvodce (in Czech). Prague: Muzeum hlavního města Prahy, 2001. ISBN 80-85394-37-5
- MÍKA, Zdeněk. 100 let Muzea hlavního města Prahy (in Czech). Prague 1983
- STÁTNÍKOVÁ, Pavla, Městské museum Pražské roku 1883 příspěvek ke 120. výročí otevření první expozice Muzea veřejnosti. Historia Pragensia. Historický sborník Muzea hlavního města Prahy (in Czech). Prague: Muzeum hlavního města Prahy, 2003. ISBN 80-85394-46-4
- WIRTH, Zdeněk. Antonín Wiehl a česká renesance (in Czech). 1st ed. Prague: Jan Štenc, 1921 (printed 1921). 27 pages, pp. 7–11, 26. Special reprint from the collection Umění.
