= Bedřich Smetana Museum =

- Muzeum Bedřicha Smetany
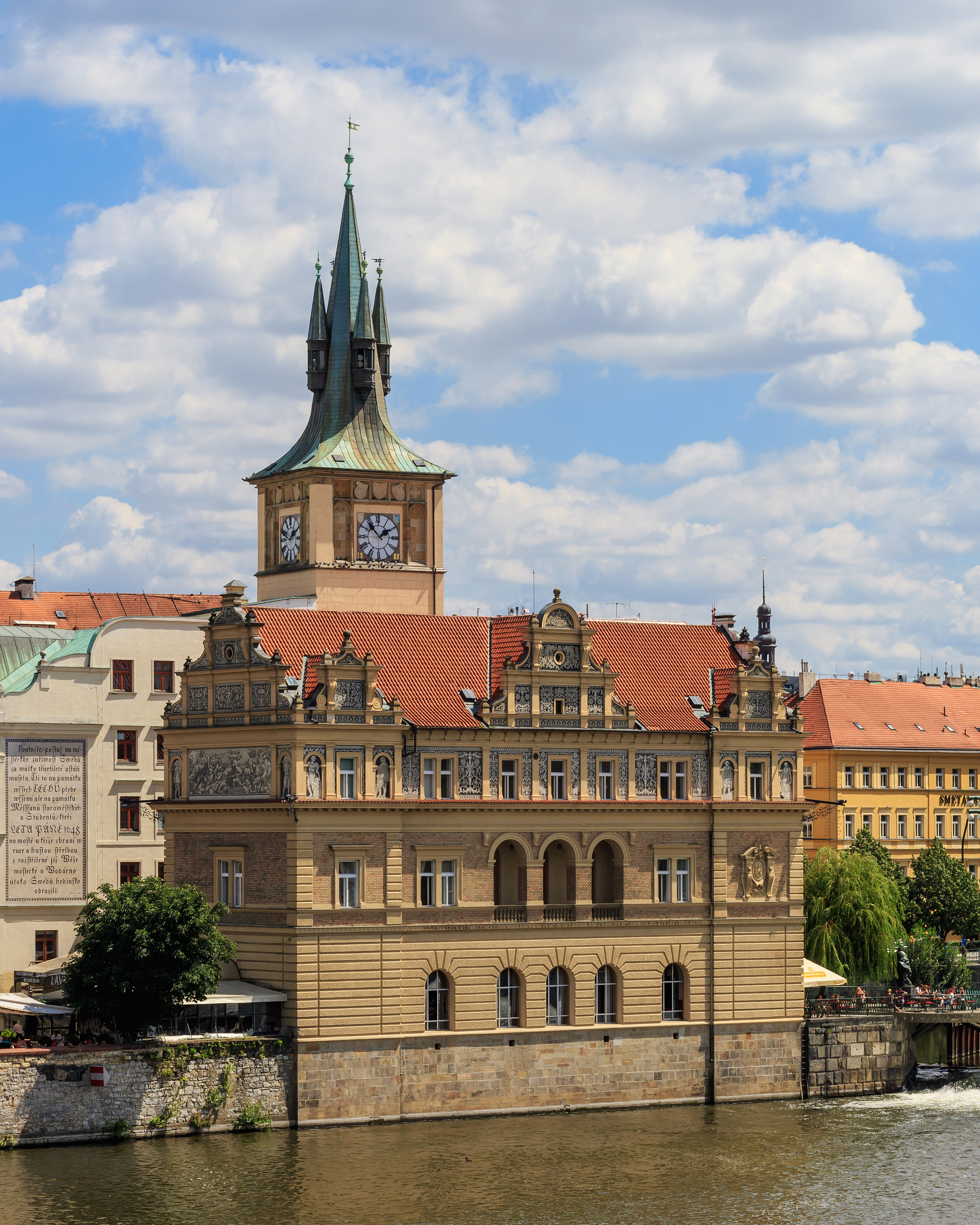
- Interactive fullscreen map
- Established: 1936; 90 years ago
- Location: Novotného lávka 201/1, Prague 1, Czech Republic, 110 00
- Coordinates: 50°05′7.5″N 14°24′46.7″E
- Website: https://www.nm.cz/navstivte-nas/objekty/muzeum-bedricha-smetany

The Bedřich Smetana Museum (Czech: Muzeum Bedřicha Smetany) in Prague is a museum which is dedicated to the life and works of famous Czech composer Bedřich Smetana (1824–1884). It is situated in the centre of Prague in a small block of buildings right next to Charles Bridge on the right bank of the river Vltava in the Old Town (Novotného lávka 1, Praha 1).

The building, designed by Antonín Wiehl, which was formerly owned by Prague Water Company, has housed the Smetana Museum since 1936. It is a grand building in the Renaissance style. The main part of the museum exhibits are on the first floor. The upper floors house archive material relating to Smetana, providing a centre for research.

Exhibits include copies of letters, photographs and newspaper cuttings relating to Smetana’s life as well as various possessions including his earbone (Smetana suffered from deafness). There are also folders on music stands which contain material about some of Smetana’s most famous works. The visitor is able to listen to extracts from these works by zapping the required music stand with an electronic baton.

Smetana was the leading Czech composer at a time when Czech nationalism was allowed to be expressed through the medium of the arts, which had so long been dominated by the official language, German. The Czech people were searching for their national identity and for the first time had the opportunity to perform plays and operas in Czech. The embodiment of this movement was the National Theatre which opened in November 1883 with a performance of a specially written opera by Smetana, Libuše, which deals with the legendary story of the foundation of Prague. His six symphonic poems Má vlast (My Country) describe various aspects of his homeland: its countryside and legends. The second of these tone-poems, Vltava, is especially popular. The main tune is broadcast over the public address system at Prague’s main railway station.

The museum is open daily except on Tuesdays.

== See also ==
- List of music museums
- Statue of Bedřich Smetana, Prague

== Sources ==
- “Czech and Slovak Republics” ISBN 981-234-714-3
