= Statue of Bedřich Smetana, Prague =

Statue in Prague, Czech Republic

Statue of Bedřich Smetana
- Socha Bedřicha Smetany (Czech)
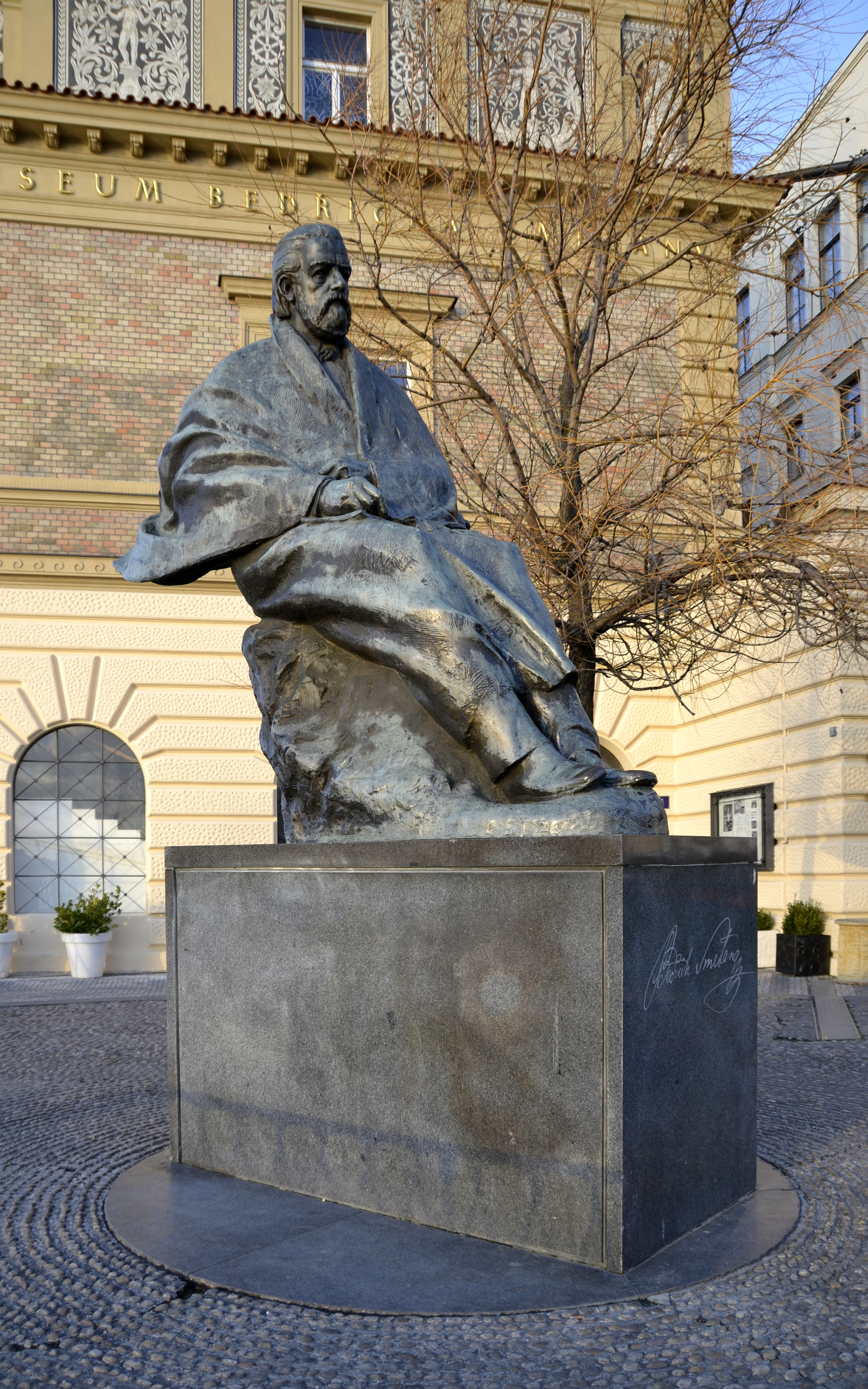
- The statue in 2012
- Year: 1984
- Type: Sculpture
- Medium: bronze
- Subject: Bedřich Smetana
- Dimensions: 235 cm (93 in)
- Location: outside Bedřich Smetana Museum, Prague, Czech Republic; 50.085335°N 14.412924°E

The statue of Bedřich Smetana (Czech: Socha Bedřicha Smetany) is a sculpture of the famous Czech composer Bedřich Smetana (1824–1884) located outside the Smetana Museum in Prague, Czech Republic. It was unveiled on 4 June 1984, in the centenary year of his death. The sculpture, 235 cm high and weighing about a ton, was by professor Josef Malejovský and architect Bedřich Hanák.
