= Josef Niklas =

Czech architect and academic (1817–1877)

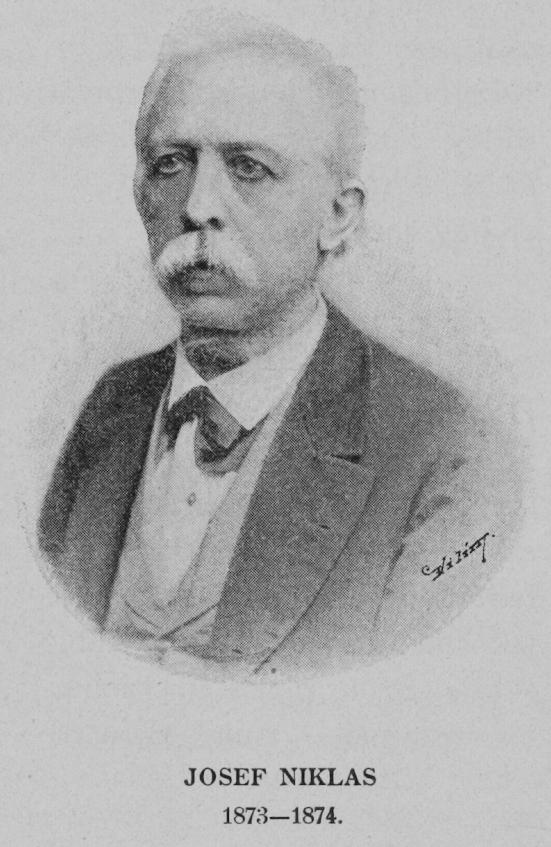
- Josef Niklas, drawing by Jan Vilím
- Born: 11 March 1817; Volyně, Bohemia, Austrian Empire
- Died: 10 October 1877 (aged 60); Prague, Bohemia, Austria-Hungary
- Occupations: architect, pedagogue

Josef Niklas (11 March 1817 – 10 October 1877) was a Czech architect, builder and pedagogue. In 1873–1874, he was the rector of the Czech Technical University in Prague.

== Biography ==
Josef Niklas was born on 11 March 1817 in Volyně. He graduated from a primary school in Český Krumlov and from the Polytechnic Institute in Prague. In 1836–1840, he was employed by the Prague builder Jindřich Fencl, then in 1841–1845, he worked for Leopold Mayer. In 1845, he travelled around Europe to study various architectural styles. He then returned to Prague and devoted himself to industrial drawings and private buildings according to his own designs.

From 1849, he was an assistant at the Czech Technical University in Prague (ČVUT). From 1850, he taught at a real school in Prague 2. In 1864, he became a professor at the ČVUT, where he was also the Test Commissioner for Civil Surveyors. In 1873–1874, he was the rector of the ČVUT.

Niklas died in Prague on 10 October 1877, aged 60.

== Work ==
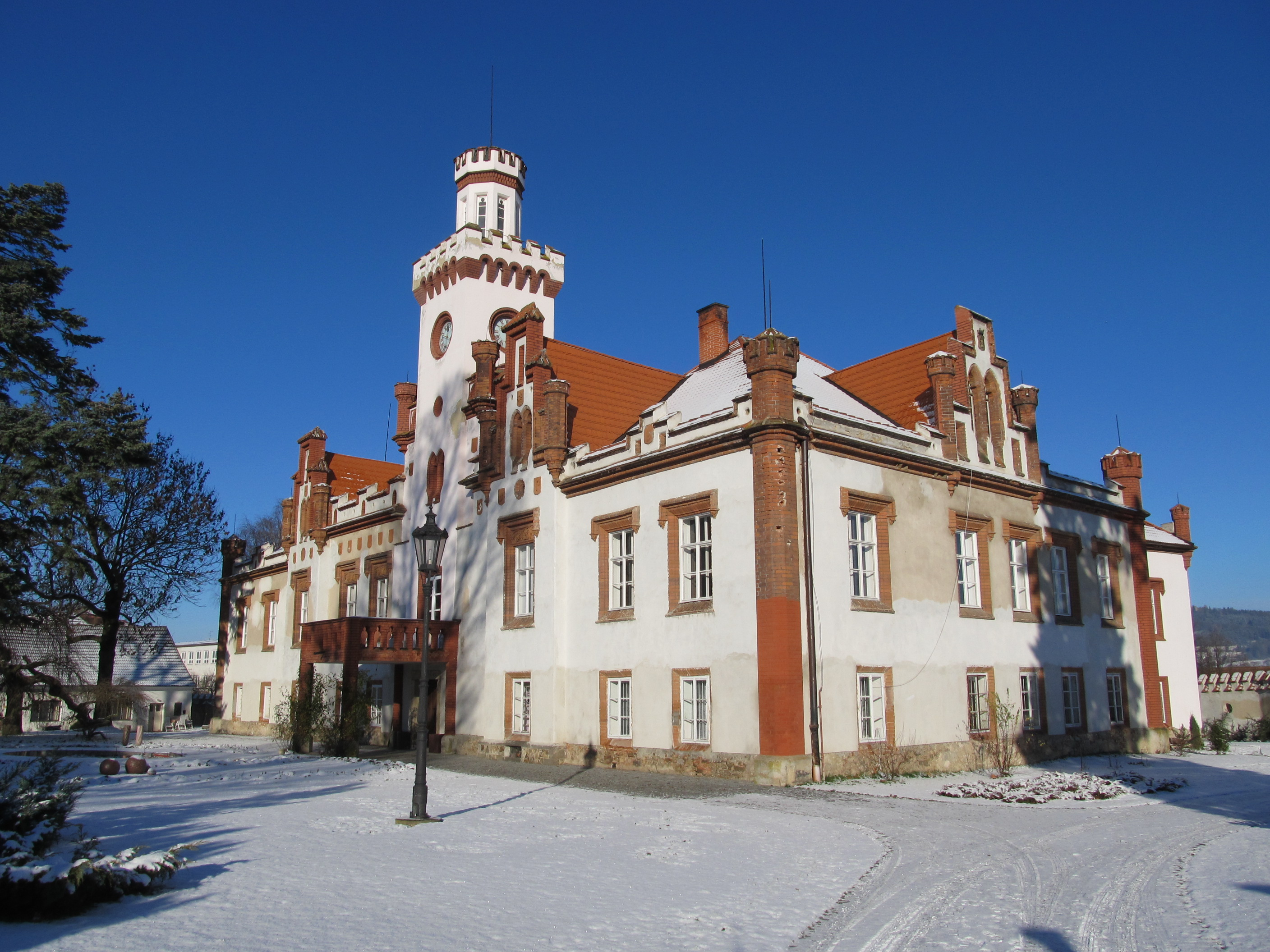
Dub Castle

Niklas preferred the neo-Gothic style in his work. His quality work was considered New Town Theatre in Prague (1857–1858), however, it was demolished in 1886. Among Niklas' notable works are the neo-Gothic reconstructions of the Dub Castle in Dub (1854–1860), Jetřichovice Castle in Sedlec-Prčice (1857–1859) and Skřivany Castle in Skřivany (1867–1868). The main part of his work was the construction of many private houses in Prague. His last work was provostship in Prague-Vyšehrad (1874).

A valuable work of Niklas is the Old Town Hall in Tábor, which is protected as a national cultural monument. It was restored to its late Gothic appearance according to the plans of Josef Niklas in 1878, shortly after his death.

Niklas is also the author of the Chapel of the Holy Guardian Angel (1858) in his native Volyně, the project of which he developed for the town free of charge.

== Honours ==
In 2017, Niklas was posthumously awarded Honorary Citizenship of the Town of Volyně.

== Gallery ==
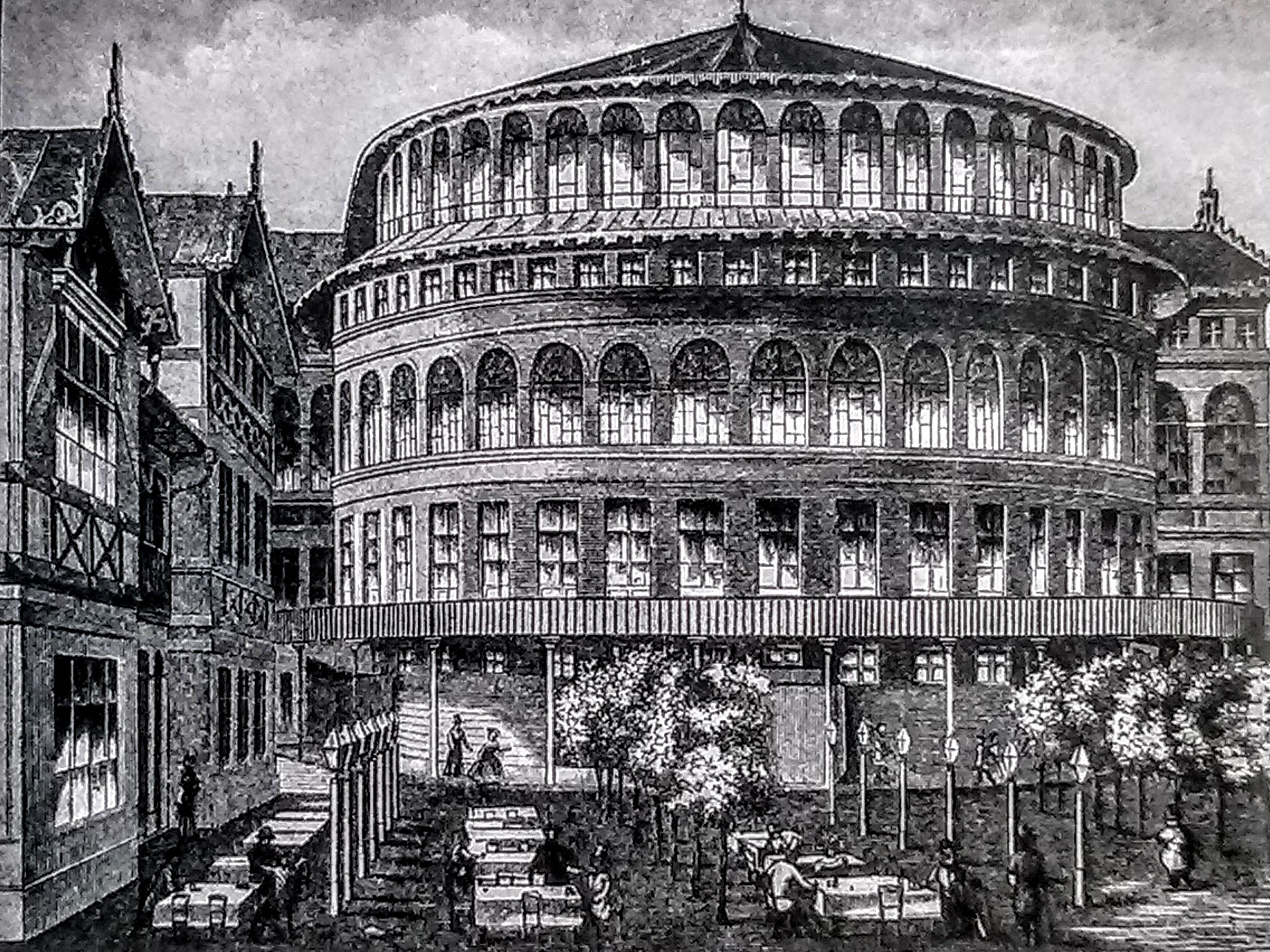
New Town Theatre in Prague in 1885

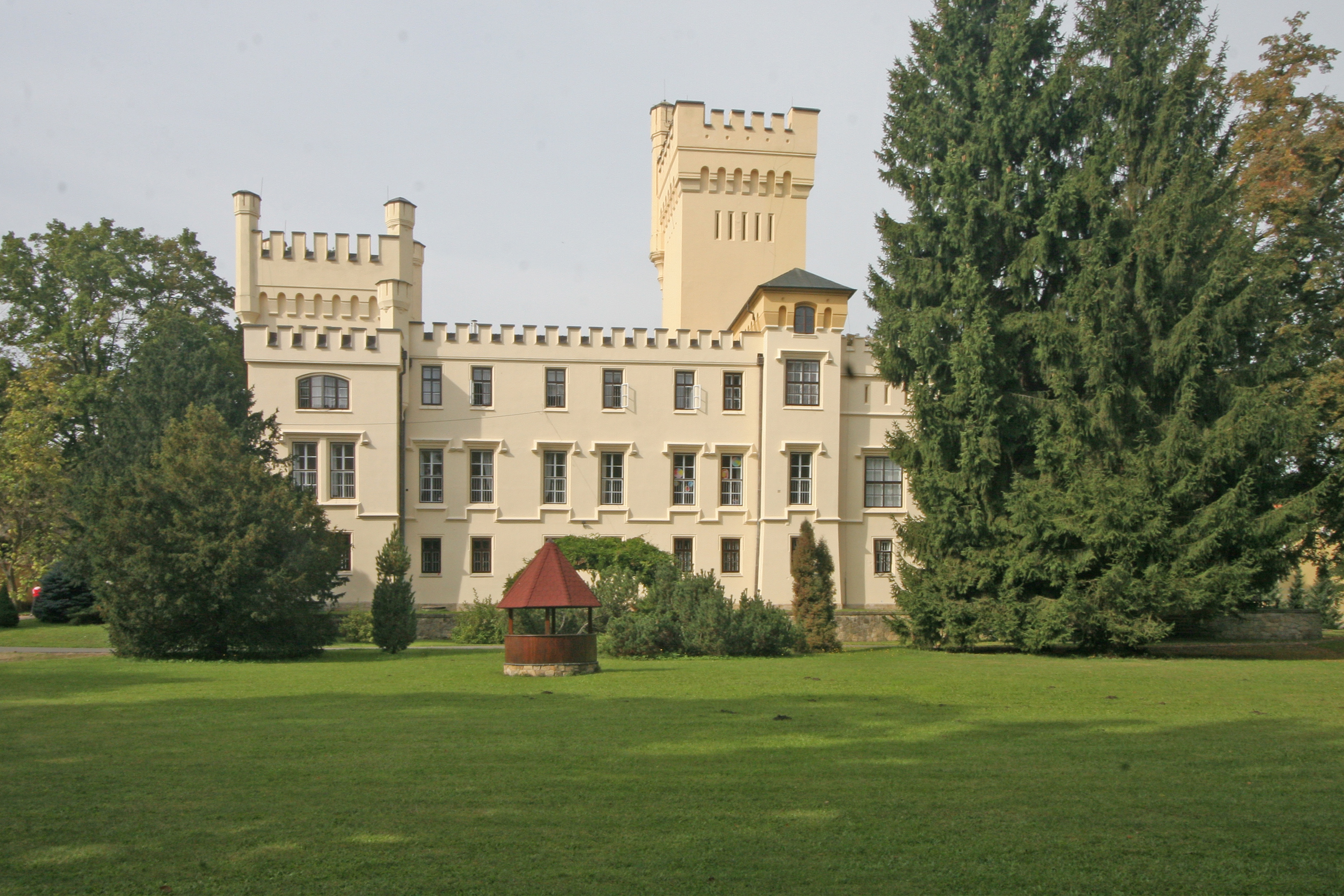
Skřivany Castle

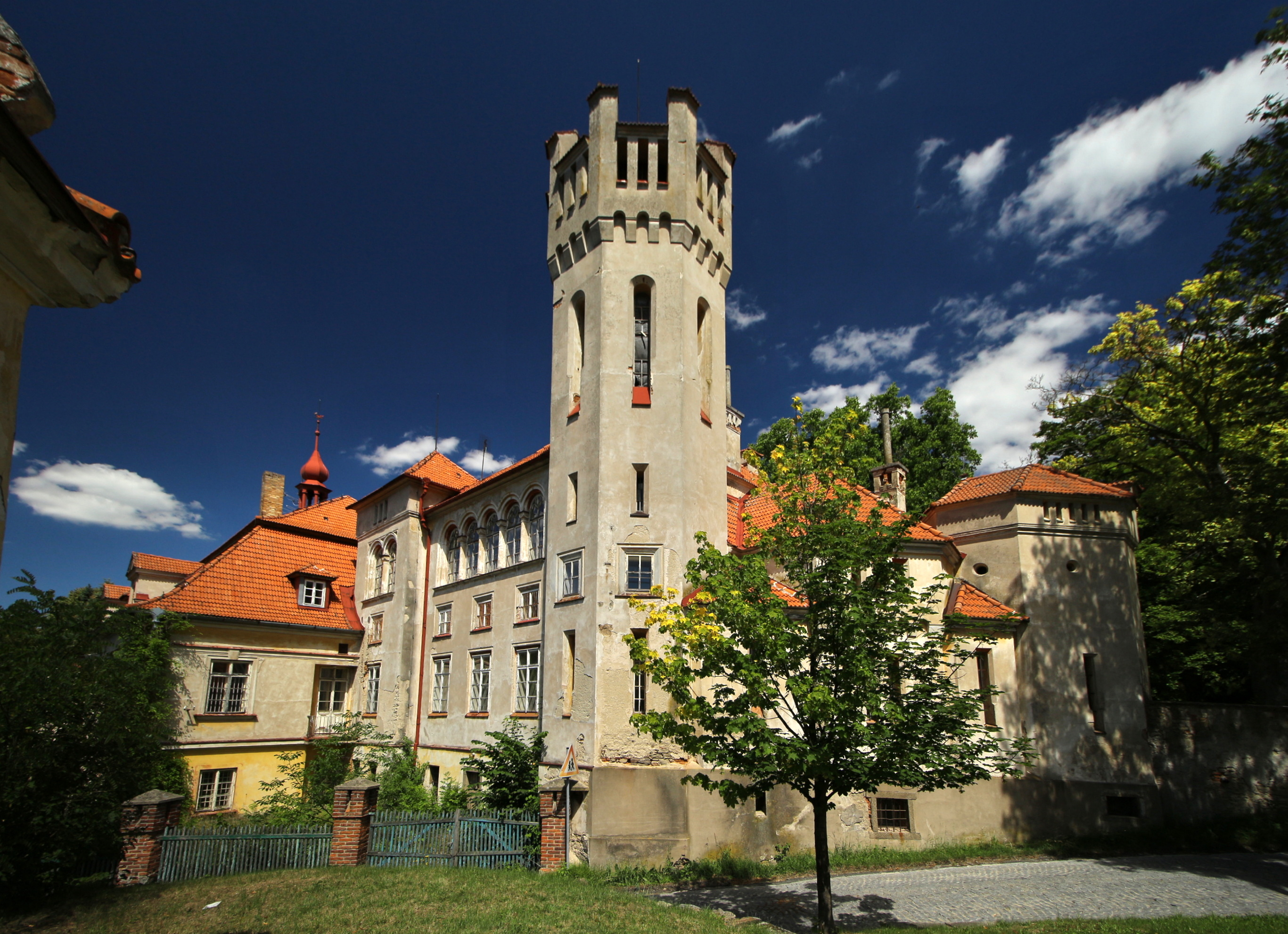
Jetřichovice Castle

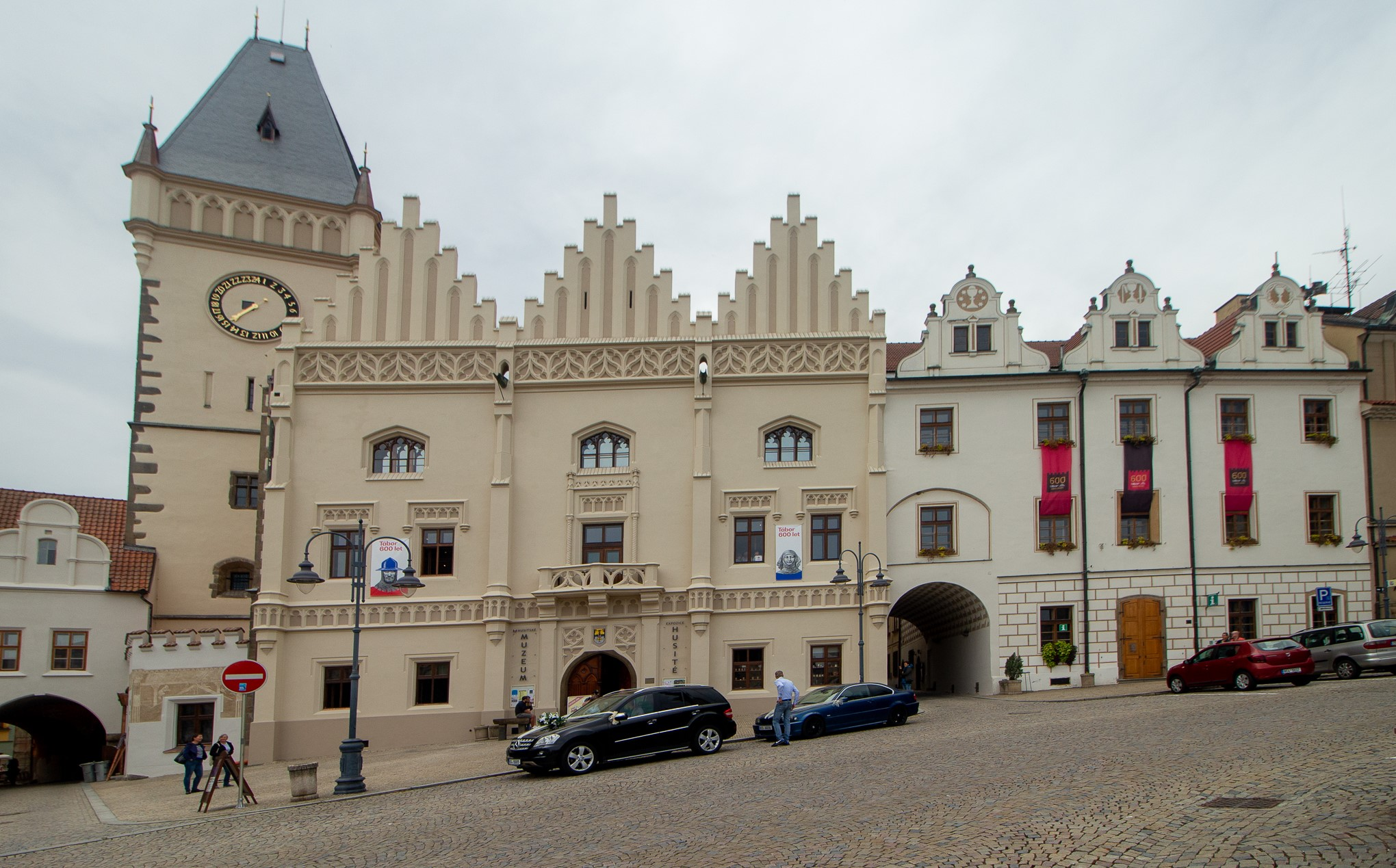
Old Town Hall in Tábor

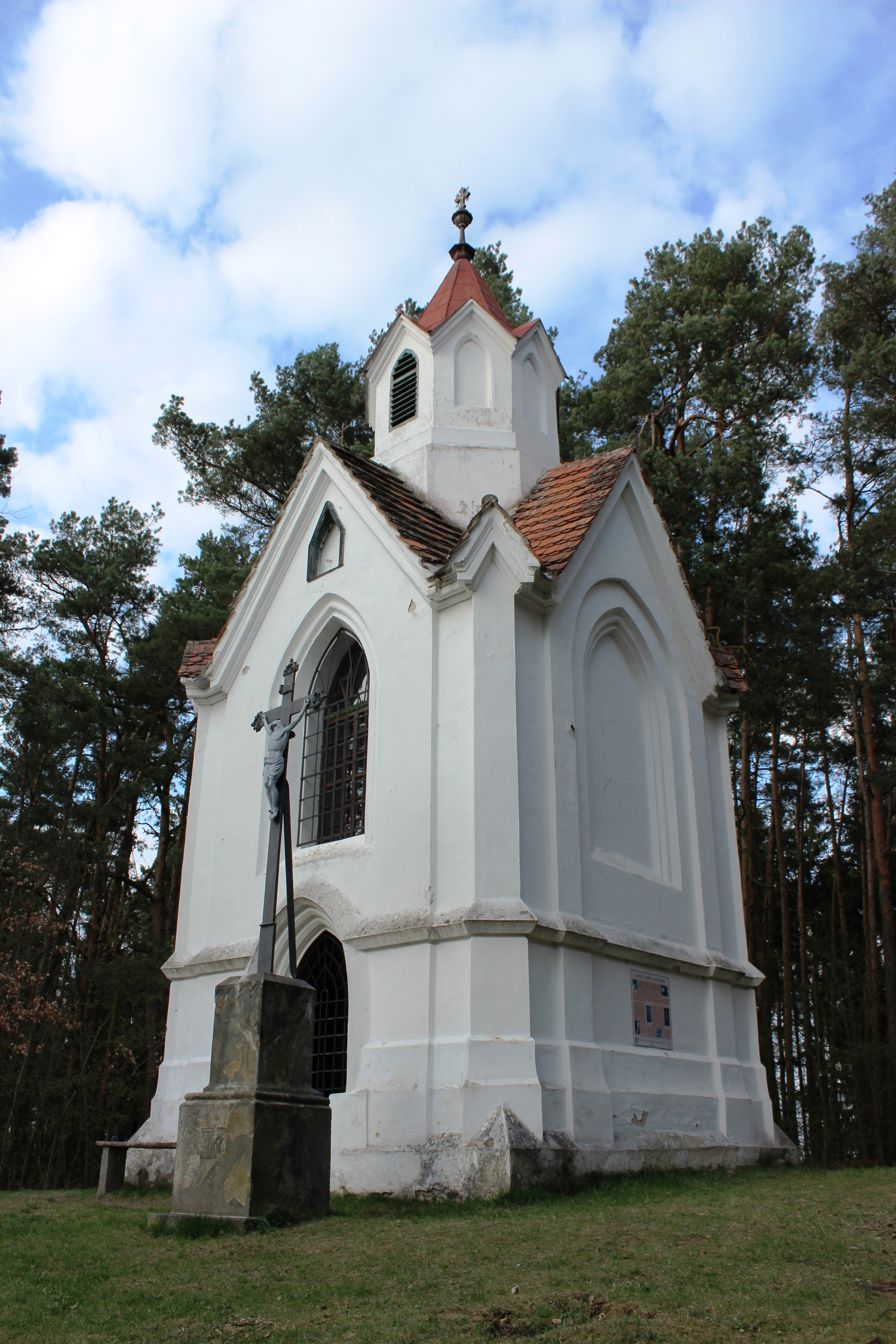
Chapel of the Holy Guardian Angel
