= Renáta Tyršová =

Czech ethnographer and art historian

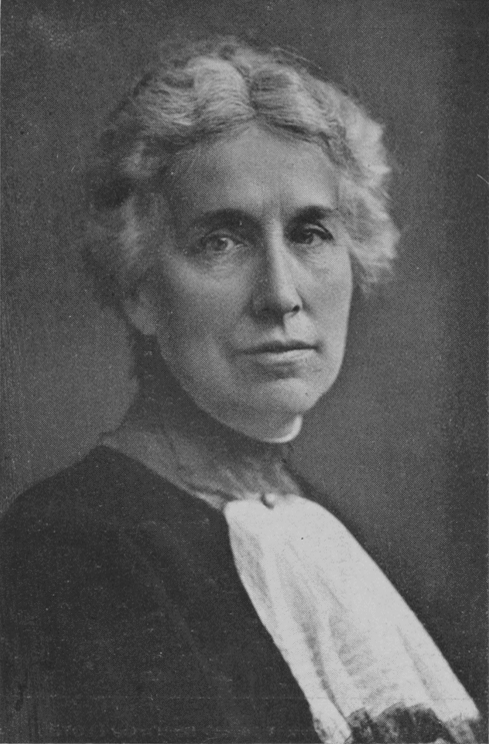

Renáta Tyršová (née Renata Maria Adelina Fügner; 31 July 1854, Prague – 22 February 1937, Prague) was a Czech ethnographer and art historian. She is best remembered for writing about embroidery, folk costume, and home decor in Bohemia, Moravia, and Silesia in her works Rukopis Královodvorský (1896), Slovácké vyšívání (1897), Lidový kroj v Čechách, na Moravě a ve Slezsku (1918), and Nauka o kroji (1923).
