= Josef Kaizl =

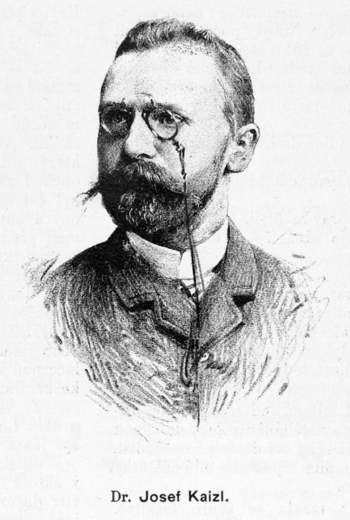
- Drawing of Josef Kaizl by Jan Vilímek (1886)

Imperial Minister of Finance
- In office 1898–1899

Member of the Imperial Council
- In office 1885–1887
- In office 1891–1901

Personal details
- Born: 18 June 1854 Volyně, Bohemia, Austrian Empire
- Died: 19 August 1901 (aged 47) Myslkovice, Bohemia, Austria-Hungary
- Party: Old Czech Party; Czech Realist Party; Young Czech Party
- Occupation: Professor, politician, economist

Josef Kaizl (10 June 1854 – 19 August 1901) was a Czech economist, professor and politician in the Austro-Hungarian Empire. He was a member of the Imperial Council, and also Cisleithanian finance minister (1898–1899). Kaizl was leading Czech liberal politician, known for his moderate attitudes and seeking of various means to strengthen autonomous position of Czech lands within the Austro-Hungarian Empire. He served as the first Czech economics teacher at the Charles University. His close friends and collaborators were Jan Gebauer and Tomáš Masaryk (who later became the first president of the Czechoslovak Republic).

== Early life and education ==
Kaizl was born on 10 June 1854 in Volyně. He was born into the family of Eduard Kaizl, controller of inland revenue, and a German speaking mother. He was the oldest of seven siblings.

Schooling began in a German-language school in Rumburk in northern Bohemia. After transferring schools he was sent to his aunt in Prague. He studied German and later Czech during parochial school at the Church of Our Lady Victorious. In 1863 he began his high school studies there.

He studied law at the Charles University in Prague (1871-1875), while in between the years 1874-1875 he underwent mandatory military service in the military supply corps. in Prague. He later went on to study economics at the University of Strasbourg (1877) under Gustav von Schmoller and Georg Friedrich Knapp. He would become a large proponent of the Schmoller historical method, and spread it through his writings.

In 1879 he started as an assistant professor in economics at Charles University. He lectured both in Czech and German. Josef Kaizl, alongside Albín Bráf, was later appointed as the first Czech economist of Charles University. In 1888 he became a full professor.

== Political activities ==
In the Imperial Council elections of 1885 he won a seat representing the Old Czechs. The party, however, broke opinions and he announced his resignation from the Council in 1887.

After 1887, he collaborated closely with Tomáš Masaryk on expanding the Realist philosophical movement. Though he would later become a critic of some of Masaryk's views, specifically Masaryk's belief that Czech political reform and revival had its roots in the ideals of Czech religious reformation. Kaizl viewed Masaryk's theory as illiberal and too religiously focused. Kaizl believed Czech national revival derived its true roots from the French and American Revolutions.

=== Young Czech politician ===
In 1890 alongside other realists (including Masaryk) he joined the Young Czechs. In the same year he returned to the Imperial Council. In the 1891 election he was elected to the Vienna parliament for the Young Czechs. Here he delivered a formal declaration supporting self-determination and nationalism, but this declaration was not well supported. Historian Otto Urban judges Kaizl's declarations as being a manifestation of the Young Czech's overall views, despite the more radical views that had launched the Young Czech's to prominence. Due to Kaizl's efforts, the Young Czechs professed more moderate and rational arguments. Unlike Masaryk, Kaizl became a longstanding fixture within the Young Czech party. Kaizl played a critical role in becoming a moderating force against radicalism in the Young Czech party. In 1894 he helped prepare, alongside Karel Kramář, the Nymburská Resolution. This resolution called for "constructive opposition" against "false radicalism" found in the Young Czech party. In 1895 Masaryk and Kaizl had a disagreement due to Masaryk's criticism of liberalism and his support of the idea that common Czech national identity is rooted from the Czech Hussites; Kaizl instead advocated for the standard European liberal ideology and nationalism. Kaizl defined the concept of phasing politics, and said that the young Czechs are temperamentally connected to the liberalism and democratization of Austria-Hungary. Substantial disagreements between Masaryk, Kaizl, and other party members led to Masaryk's resignation and his formation of the Czech Progressive Party.

In 1896 in parliament the Badeni's voter reforms occurred, which widened the voter rights of citizens. During this election the Young Czechs splintered but Kaizl led the majority faction and in the following months was successful in eliminating the radicals. In 1896, he succeeded in getting the Czech language to be recognized as an official working language within the Czech lands. In 1897 the Young Czechs became the largest parliamentary faction in Imperial council.

Kaizl would see through to the end of the Young Czech's as a political party. The Young Czechs had begun to dissolve by the 1890s. Problems with the Young Czech reign: the party's inability to win legislation adequate to satisfy rising Czech expectations and needs; government suppression of the labor and radical youth movements, with resultant curtailment of civil liberties; bitter disputes among party leaders and factions including Masaryk, Kaizl, and Kramář; opportunistic tactics that discouraged progressive liberalism all induced the dissolution of the party.

=== Finance minister ===
Starting in 1898 Josef Kaizl became the finance minister of the Austrian government under the Count Thun government. Under his ministership he became a proponent of the thesis that the best guarantee for a secure Czech nation would be a strong and equitable Austria. Kaizl completed regular negotiation of financial transactions between both halves of the Austria-Hungarian dual monarchy. During his ministership he appointed several qualified Czech officials, who later came in use for the establishment of the new Czechoslovak Ministry of Finance in 1918. Kaizl also made significant contributions towards the establishment of the Brno University of Technology.

== Later life ==
Kaizl would remain the de facto head of the Young Czechs, and repeatedly acted as a moderating element. Kaizl would defend his seat in parliament and the Vienna Imperial Council until his death, where he would then be replaced by the deputy chair Franz Fiedler.

He died unexpectedly on 19 August 1901 at the age of 47 in his summer residence in the village of Myslkovice. His body was embalmed and buried in Prague's Vyšehrad Cemetery. Kaizl's tomb is adorned with a statue crafted by Czech sculptor Bohumil Kafka.

== Works ==
in German

- Der Kampf um die Gewerbereform und Gewerbefreiheit in Bayern 1799–1868 ("The Battle for the Commercial Reform and Freedom of Trade in Bavaria"), 1879
- Die Lehre von der Überwälzung der Steuern, 1882

in Czech

- Národní hospodářství ("National Economy"), 1883
- O postátnění železnic v Rakousku ("The Nationalization of the Railways in Austria"), 1883
- Obnovený řád živnostenský ("Renewed Trade Regulation"), 1883
- Vyrovnání s Uhry 1866 a 1877 ("Austro-Hungarian Compromise of 1867"), 1886
- Finanční věda ("Financial Science"), 1888
- Náprava rakouské měny ("Remedy of Austrian currency"), 1890
- Lid selský, jeho poroba a vymanění v zemích českých ("Rural people, his enslavement and emancipation in the Czech lands"), 1895
- České myšlénky ("Czech Thoughts"), 1895
- O státoprávním programu českém ("About Czech Constitutional Program"), 1896
- O úroku a lichvě ("About Interest and Usury"), 1879
- Hospodářská theorie hodnoty ("Economic Theory of Value"), 1890
- Ethika a socialism ("Ethics and Socialism"), 1894
