= Gallery of Modern Art in Hradec Králové =

Municipal art gallery, Czech Republic

Coordinates: 50°12′36″N 15°50′03″E

- Galerie moderního umění v Hradci Králové
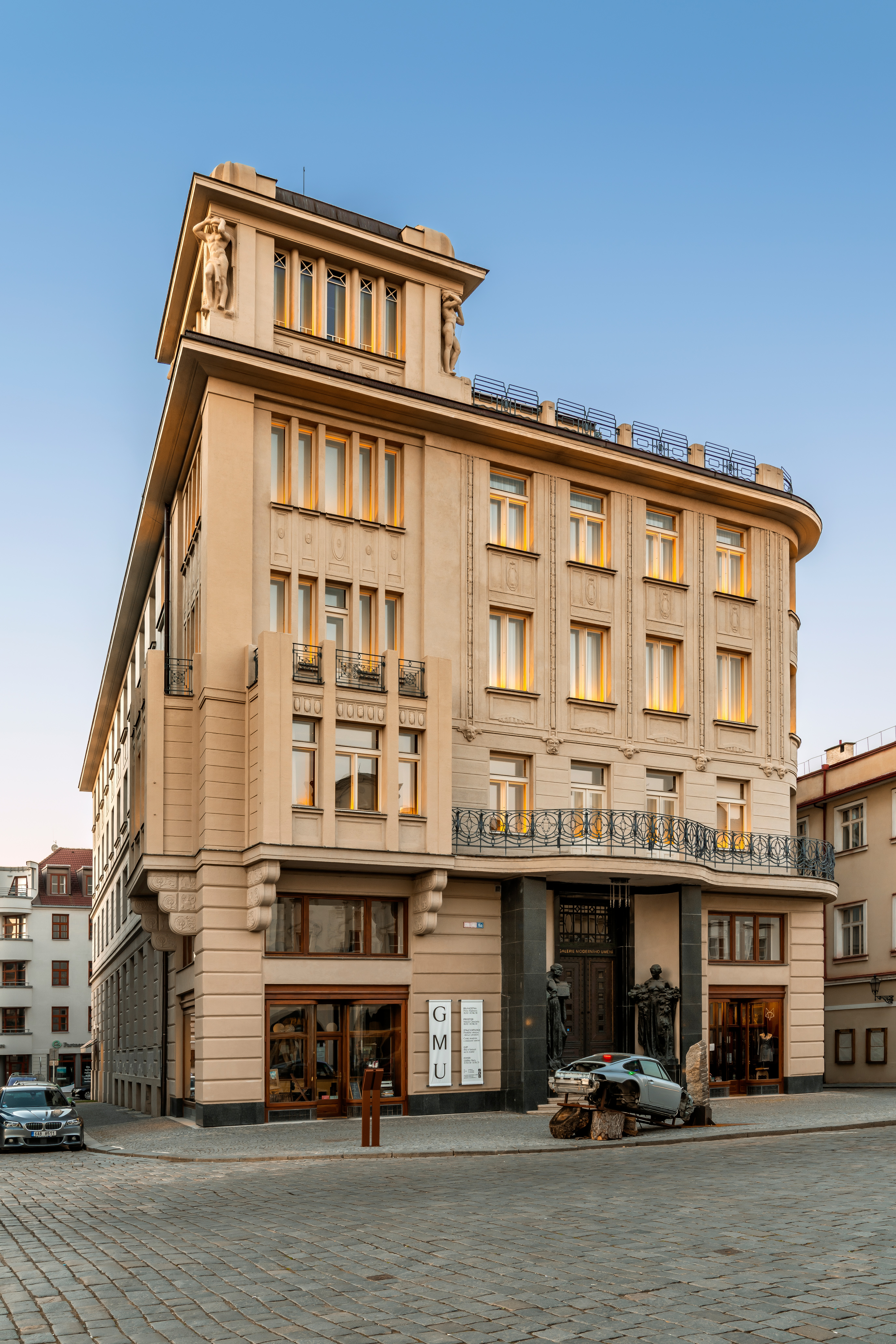
- Established: Municipal Art Gallery in Hradec Králové (founded in 1919), Regional Gallery since 1953
- Location: Hradec Králové
- Key holdings: modern Czech art since 19th century, cubism, surrealism, contemporary art
- Director: František Zachoval
- Owner: Hradec Králové Region

Gallery of Modern Art in Hradec Králové (Czech: Galerie moderního umění v Hradci Králové) is a regional art gallery in Hradec Králové, Czech Republic. It is a subsidiary organization of the Hradec Králové Region. It is located in an Art Nouveau building constructed in 1912 according to a design by architect Osvald Polívka as the palace of the Credit – Saving Institute. The main entrance to the building is decorated with monumental sculptures entitled Harvest and Trade by Ladislav Šaloun, while the cornice is supported by three Atlant figures by sculptor František Fabiánek. The original artistic decorations, including stained glass windows, stucco applications, and decorative details, have also been preserved. Between 2014 and 2016, the building underwent extensive reconstruction and modernization of the exhibition spaces. The gallery manages a collection of Czech and foreign fine art from the 19th, 20th and 21st centuries.

== History ==
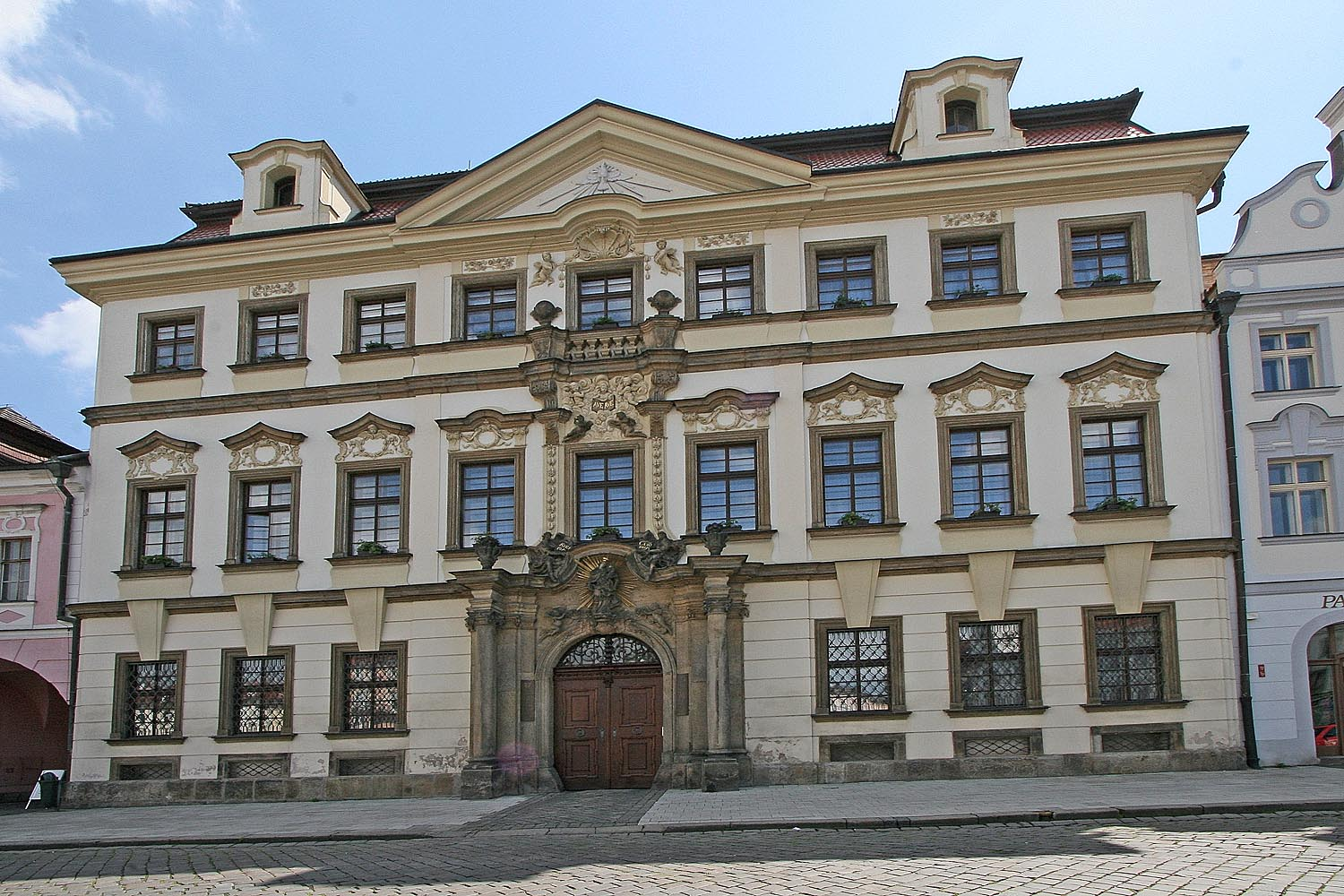
Bishop's residence in Hradec Králové

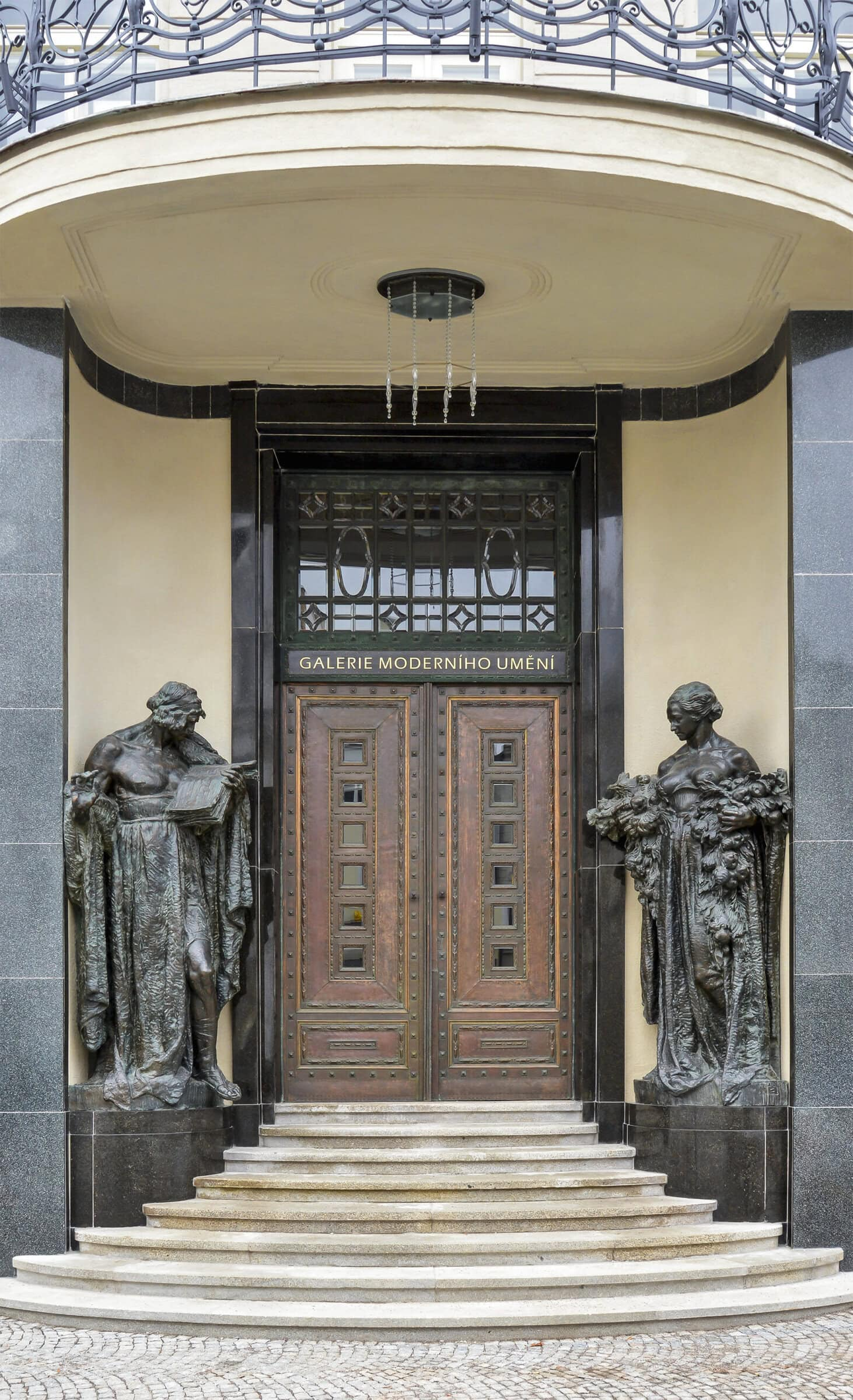
Main entrance with sculptures by Ladislav Šaloun

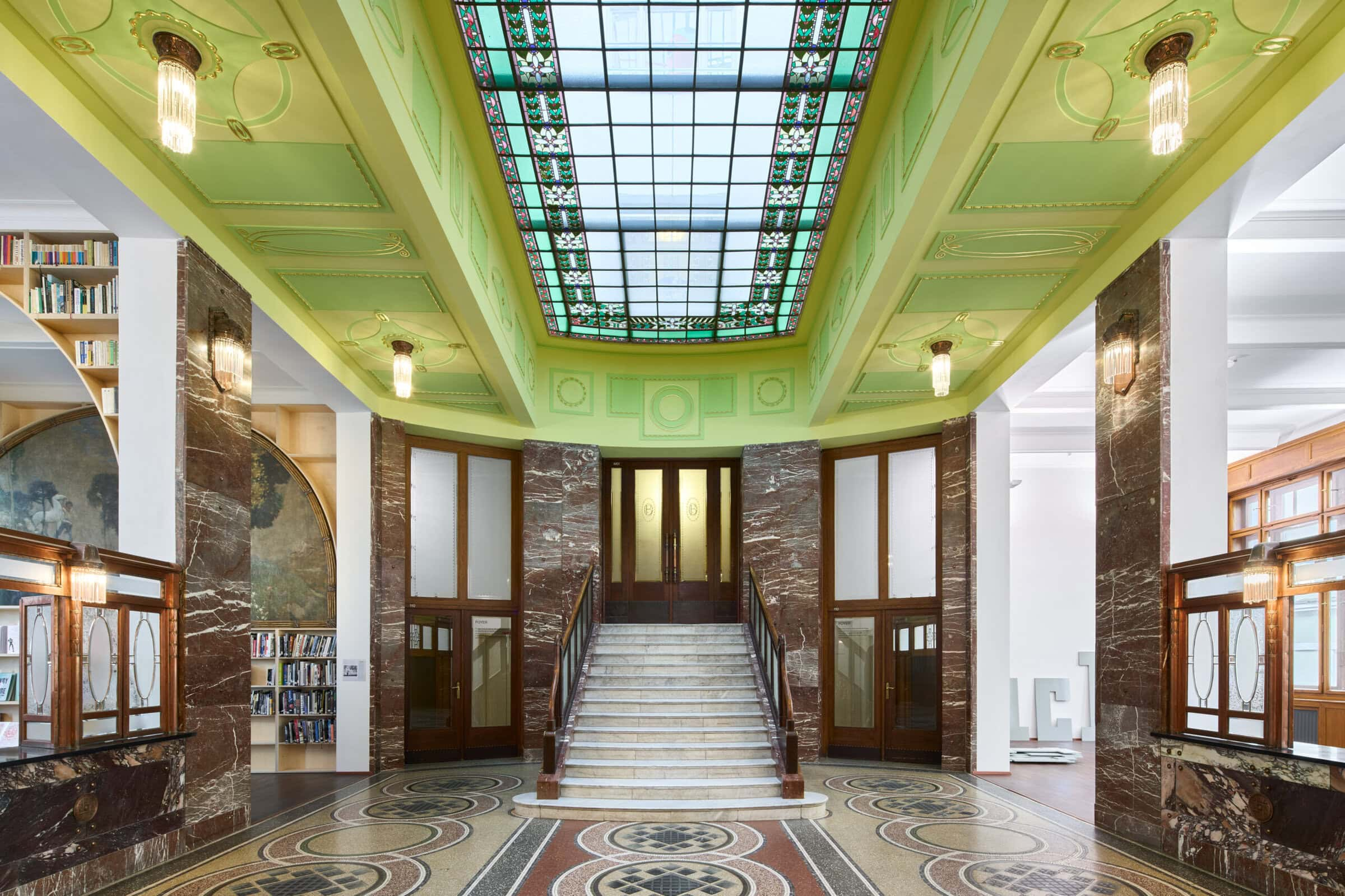
Gallery foyer

The origins of today's Gallery of Modern Art in Hradec Králové date back to the Municipal Picture Gallery (1919–1953), which was founded on the basis of a collection of one hundred paintings and works on paper donated to the city by Bishop Josef Doubrava. From 1936 to 1938, the municipal art gallery was temporarily housed in five rooms of the town hall at Velké náměstí 1, and later in the municipal museum. The then Municipal Industrial Museum in Hradec Králové organized exhibitions of fine arts in various venues (e.g., schools).

The collection was gradually expanded thanks to systematic acquisitions, which really took off after 1963. As early as the 1930s, plans were made to build a separate gallery building. At the request of the Hradec Králové Savings Bank, architect Josef Gočár drew up a design for a modernist building, dated 1 September 1930. The project envisaged a four-winged building on the banks of the Elbe with a clear functional division: the north wing for sculpture, the west wing for graphic art and architecture, the south wing for short-term exhibitions, and the east wing as an open columned gallery. Inside, there was an atrium with a garden, and the operational premises were to be hidden underground. However, the building was never constructed – the plans were not preserved and the town's associations opposed its implementation. The idea of a gallery on the riverbank was revisited in the second half of the 1930s, but development was interrupted by World War II.

The gallery was founded as an independent institution at the end of 1953 under the name Regional Gallery. Its collections, which had previously been stored in the Museum of Eastern Bohemia, were transferred under a new administration. As the town did not have suitable premises, the gallery was initially housed in the castle in Rychnov nad Kněžnou, where it was opened to the public on 31 October 1954. The first director was the painter Božena Hliněnská-Kuhnová, followed by Jan Baleka from 1956 to 1963.

After a brief period of administrative merger with the museum and heritage center into the Regional Institute of Local History (1959–1960), the gallery regained its independence in 1960 as the County Regional Gallery in Hradec Králové. In 1962, it was allocated premises in the Bishop's Residence in Hradec Králové on the Velké náměstí Square, where the collections were gradually moved and where the first permanent exhibition was opened in 1963. From the same year, the East Bohemian Regional National Council became the founder and gallery was renamed the Regional Gallery in Hradec Králové. The gallery was headed by art historian Josef Sůva, who led it until 1997. His purchasing committee included renowned art historians (Josef Krása, František Šmejkal, Petr Wittlich). Purchases were managed by the Regional National Council, which was exceptionally tolerant and did not interfere too much in the selection of works.

After 1989, the gallery moved to the building of the former palace of the Credit - Saving Institute, which had previously been used by the communist Museum of Revolutionary Traditions. From 1997 to 2018, the director was Tomáš Rybička, during whose tenure the building underwent extensive reconstruction based on a design by the architectural studio 3Q Project. The renovation in 2014–2016 partially restored the original appearance of the interiors from 1912 and at the same time adapted them for exhibition and collection purposes.

Since 2019, the institution has been headed by František Zachoval, who worked at the Academy of Fine Arts in Prague as head of the Digital Laboratory, where he co-founded the audiovisual archive for fine arts Artyčok.tv. The gallery continues to profile itself as an important center of Czech modern and contemporary art, has expanded the focus of its collections, and in 2021 purchased the extensive collection of Karel Tutsch with financial support from the Hradec Králové Region.

== Collections ==
Selected works

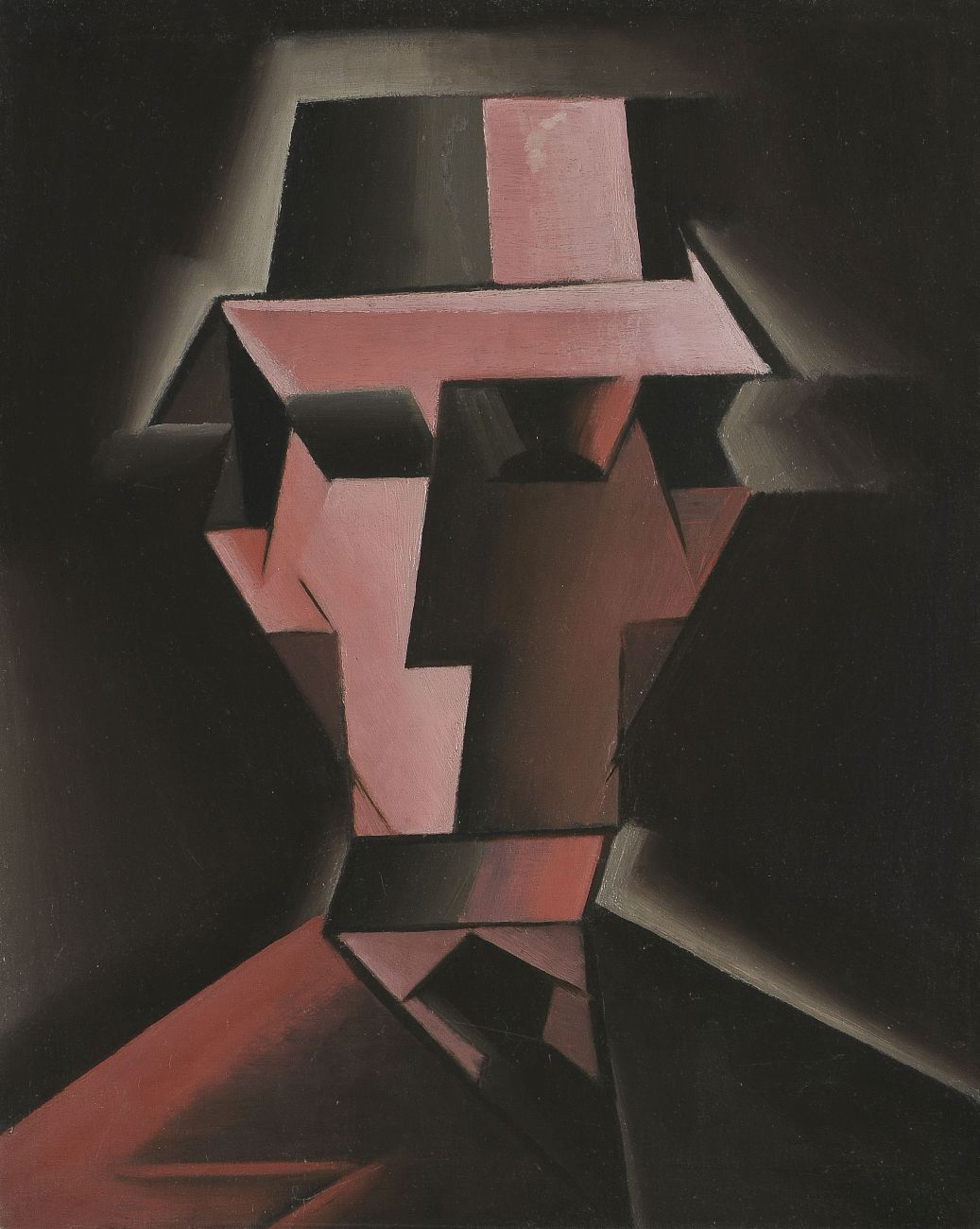
The man with the hat by Josef Čapek (1915–1916)

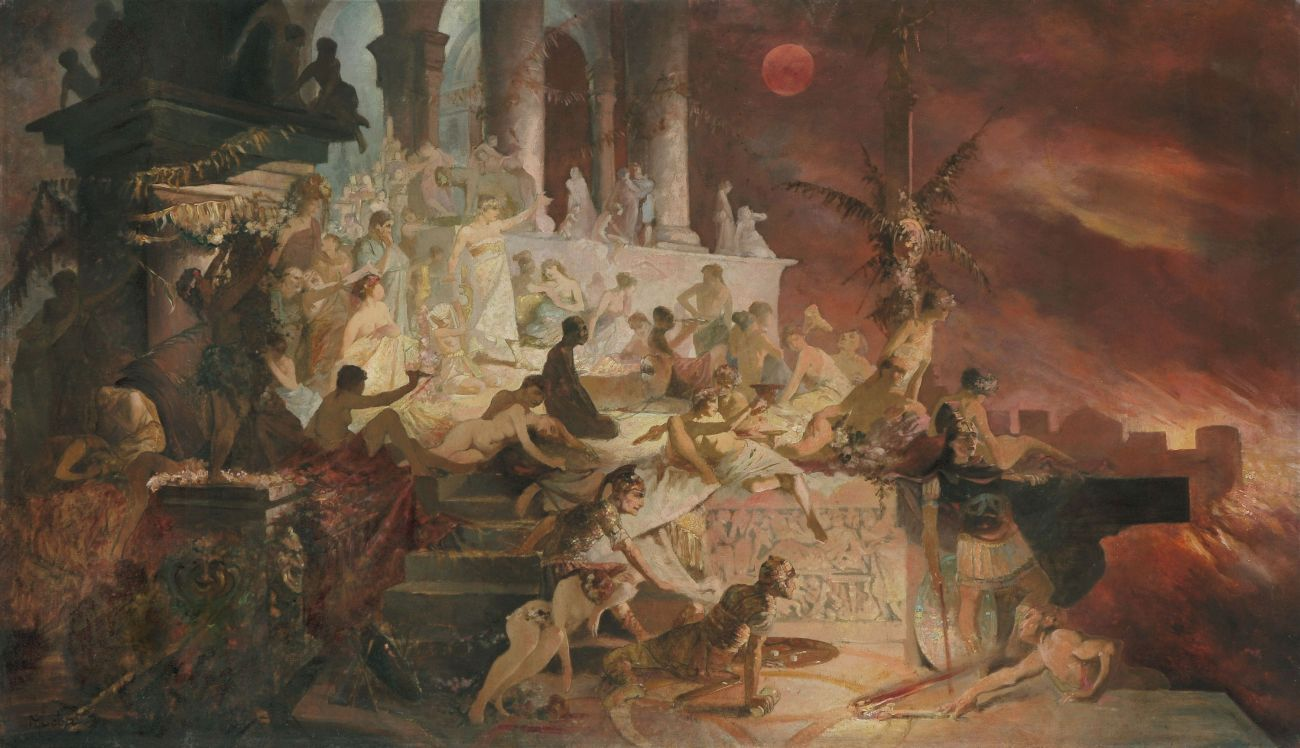
Nero watches Rome burning by Alphonse Mucha (1887)

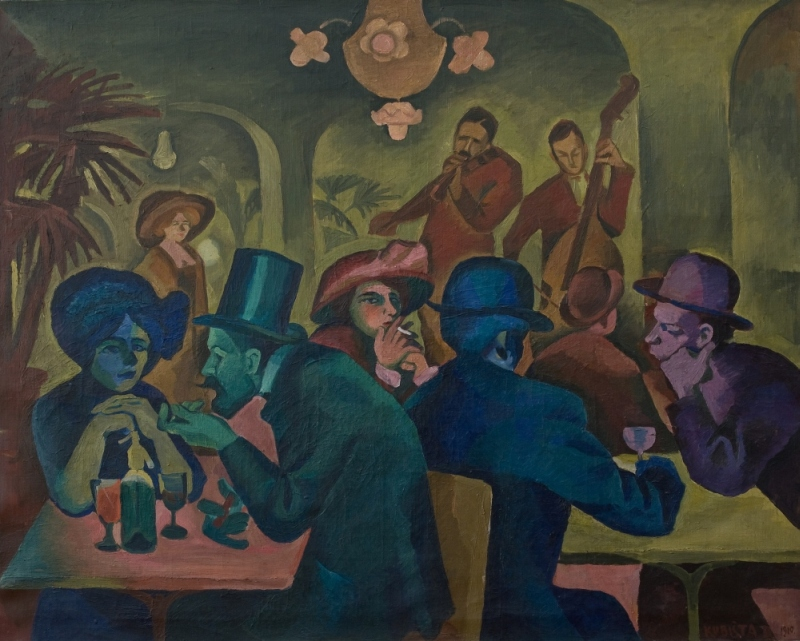
Café by Bohumil Kubišta (1910)

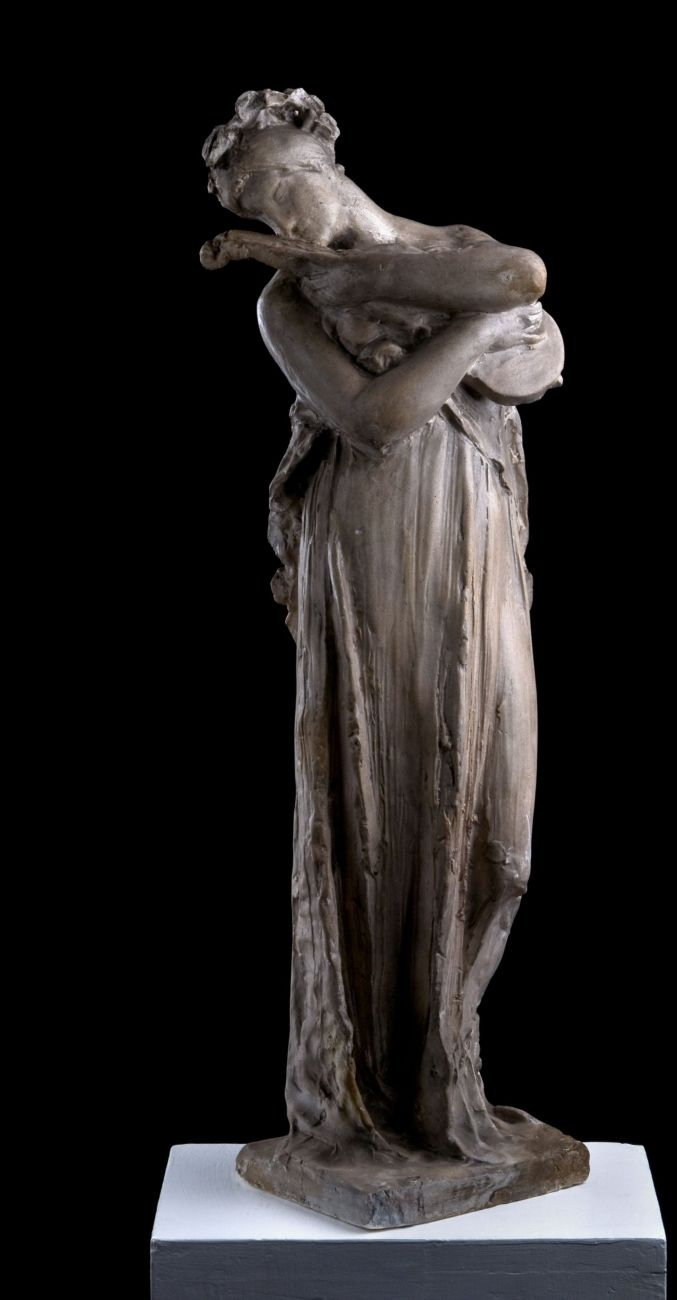
Sketch for Music by Josef Václav Myslbek (1907–1912)

In 1919, Josef Doubrava, Bishop of Hradec Králové, donated around 100 works by artists of the 19th and early 20th centuries to the city, including paintings by František Ženíšek, Max Švabinský, Luděk Marold, František Kaván, Antonín Slavíček and Jaroslav Panuška.

Gallery of Modern Art in Hradec Králové is almost the only regional gallery whose depositories are not filled with the ballast of socialist realism, compulsory purchases, and ministerial transfers. During Josef Sůva's tenure as director, the gallery created a comprehensive collection of Czech cubism, with a special focus on the work of Bohumil Kubišta, a native of nearby Vlčkovice. The collections also feature a rich representation of Czech surrealist art from the 1920s to the 1970s. Under the leadership of Dr. Sůva, the gallery also specialized in works by outsiders neglected by official history – Josef Váchal, Karel Šlenger, and Ladislav Zívr. The works of Emil Filla, Mikuláš Medek, František Muzika, Zdeněk Sklenář, Kamil Lhoták, and František Hudeček are also well represented. Before 1970, the collection contained 3,100 works of art representing a cross-section of the development of Czech fine art, especially in the first half of the 20th century, including 827 paintings and 269 sculptures.

In the 1970s and 1980s, the painting collection was expanded by 399 additions and the sculpture collection by 142 additions, mainly through purchases, and to a lesser extent through transfers from the Ministry of Culture and donations. Among them, for example, was a set of eleven sculptures by Quido Kocian donated to the gallery in 1976 by his son. Josef Sůva and his colleagues added artists from eastern Bohemia to the collection, such as František Kupka, a native of Opočno, Emil Artur Pittermann from Pardubice, Adolf Doležal from Hradec Králové, and the painter and legionnaire Jindřich Vlček. He acquired works by Václav Hejna, Alphonse Mucha, and expanded and supplemented the existing collections of Otakar Nejedlý, Pravoslav Kotík, Josef Istler, František Kaván, Stanislav Sucharda, Quido Roman Kocian, Josef Wagner, Vojtěch Sedláček, Vincenc Beneš, Václav Špála, Josef Šíma, Augustin Ságner, Alois Wachsman, František Gross, František Jiroudek, Zdenek Rykr and Jan Zrzavý. Other acquisitions include paintings by Karel Meisner, who attended the Hradec Králové secondary school, and sculptures by Josef Škoda. The relatively extensive collection of works by František Doležal includes pieces from both his imaginative and constructivist periods. The selection of medals by Zdeněk Kolářský focuses on personalities from the Hradec Králové Region.

The gallery's collection comprises over 10,000 items and is divided into several sub-collections: Paintings, Sculptures, Drawings, and Prints. It is presented to the public in a regularly changing permanent exhibition and is accessible online through the CITeM (Promus) and Web umenia databases. In recent decades, the gallery's acquisition activities have focused mainly on works created after 1989, moving images, and works by artists from Central and Eastern Europe. With a contribution from the Ministry of Culture, the gallery purchased 184 works by living artists for more than CZK 5 million.

=== Permanent exhibition ===
In December 2020, the gallery presented a new concept for its permanent exhibition, which does not arrange the works of art chronologically. Its section entitled "The Last Century" is based on the specific character of the work of twenty selected artists. The exhibition includes texts, quotations, and audio recordings. The author of the concept and curator of the gallery, Petra Příkazská, uses this method to approach the Renaissance view that the originality of the authors' expression shapes the form of art of a given era.

In the exhibition entitled The Last Fifty Years, the author of the concept, Tomáš Pospiszyl, also abandoned chronological order and approached it thematically, with an effort to present the spectrum of different approaches and tendencies in contemporary artistic creation, emphasizing the diversity of approaches of individual authors.

=== Specialized collections ===
Moving Image Collection, established in 2019, reflects the transformations of film and video media forms from the 1960s to the present. It includes experimental film, video art, film essays, installations, and documentation of performances. Represented artists include Miloš Šejn, Martin Zet, Mark Ther, Zbyněk Baladrán, Daniel Pitín, Filip Cenek and Michal Kindernay.

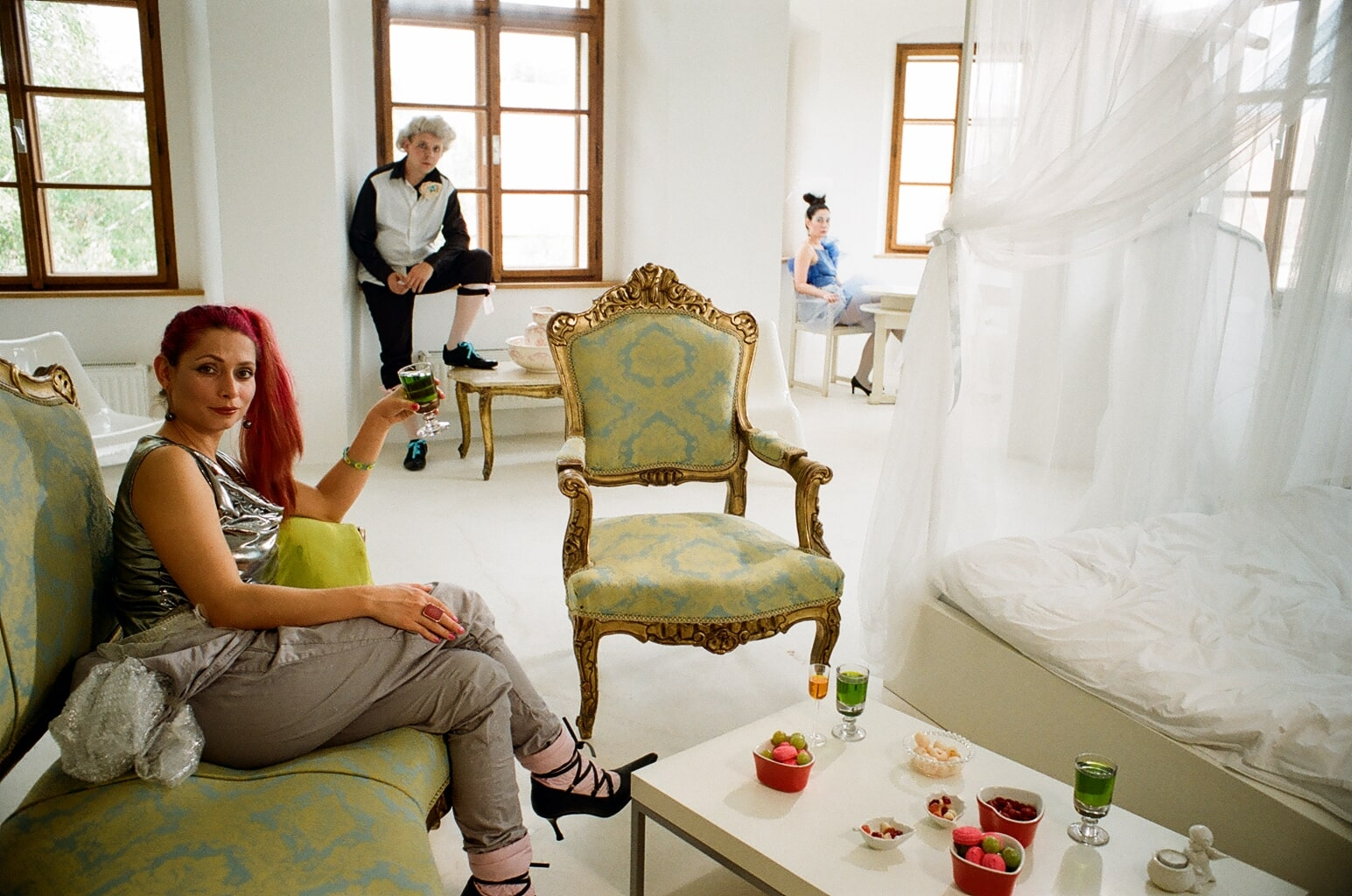
Adéla Babánová, Polobozi, 2009

Central and Eastern Europe Collection was also established in 2019. It focuses on significant works created after 2000 in the Visegrad countries and other countries in the Balkans, the Baltic states, and Eastern Europe. It emphasizes a comparative approach and the interconnection of regional contexts, thereby expanding the framework of the usual national interpretation of art history.

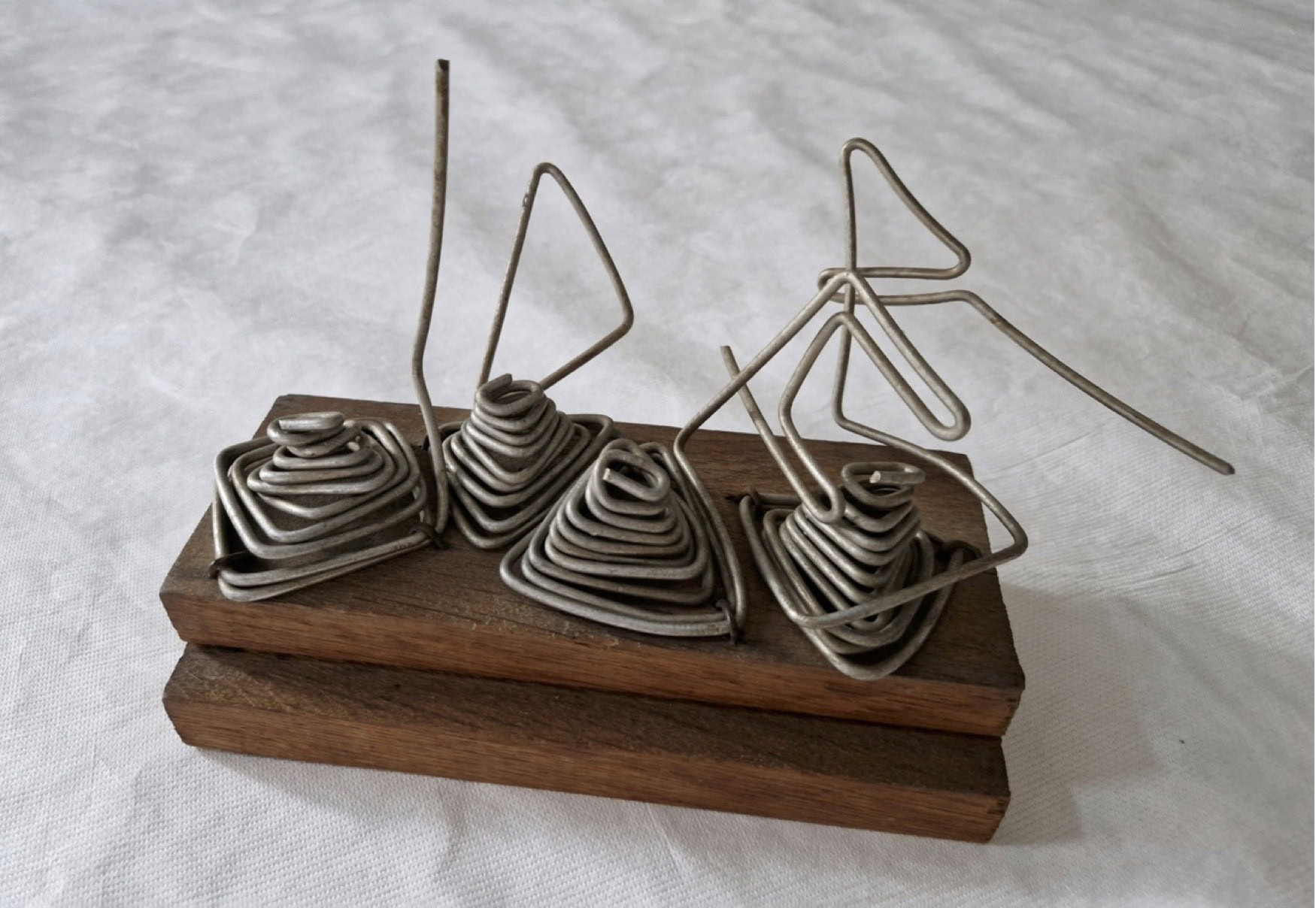
Juraj Meliš, Idea, 1975

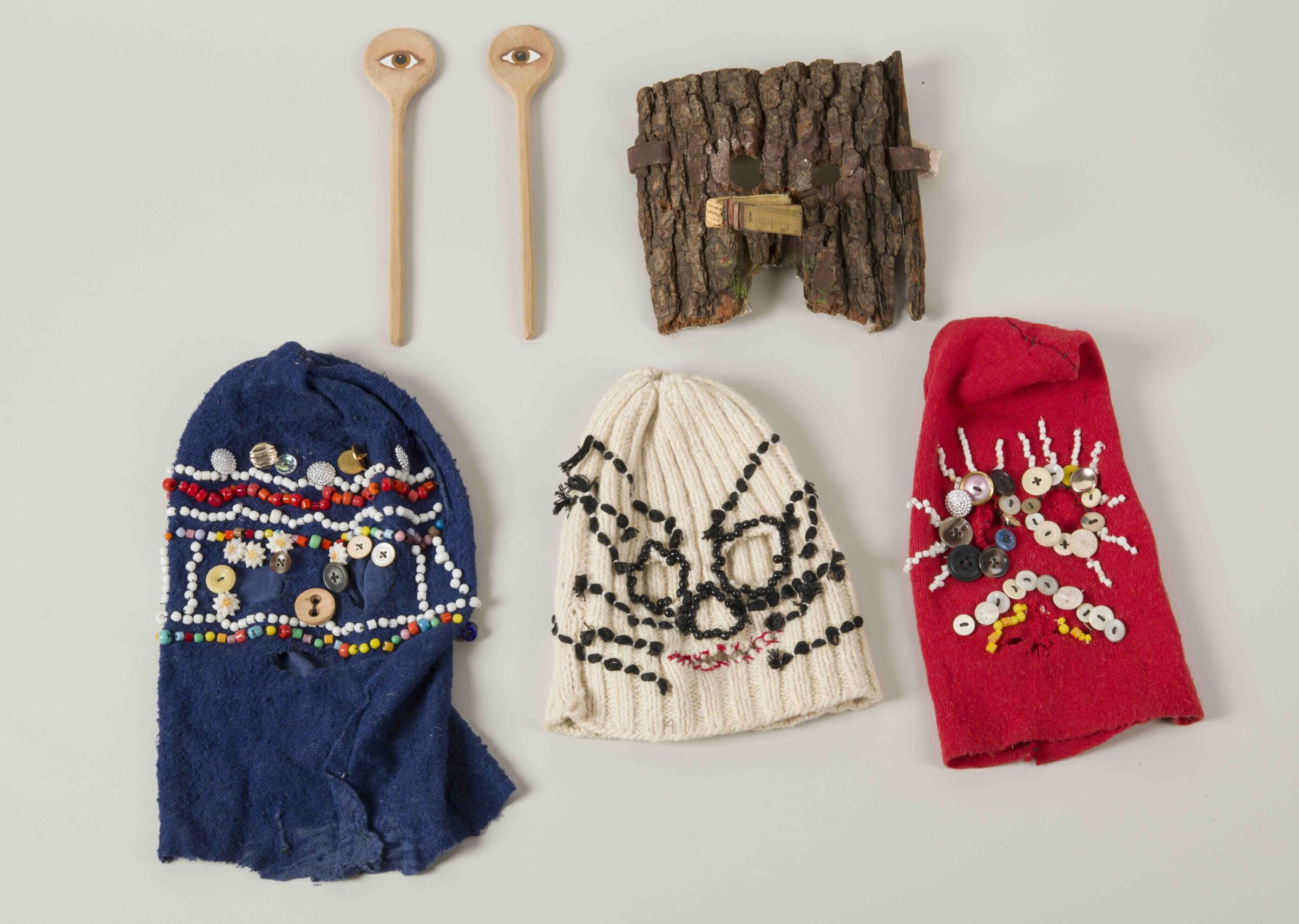
Dezider Tóth, Masks, 1989

Karel Tutsch Collection, purchased in 2021, comprises over 1,300 works and documents the transformation of Czech art from the 1980s to the present day. Karel Tutsch (1941–2008) was an important collector and gallery owner who ran the Na bidýlku Gallery in Brno from 1986 to 2008. The collection includes representatives of Czech postmodernism (Jiří Načeradský, Jiří Sopko, Jiří David, etc.) as well as foreign artists (e.g., Thomas Helbig, Andrew Gilbert, Jasper Joffe).

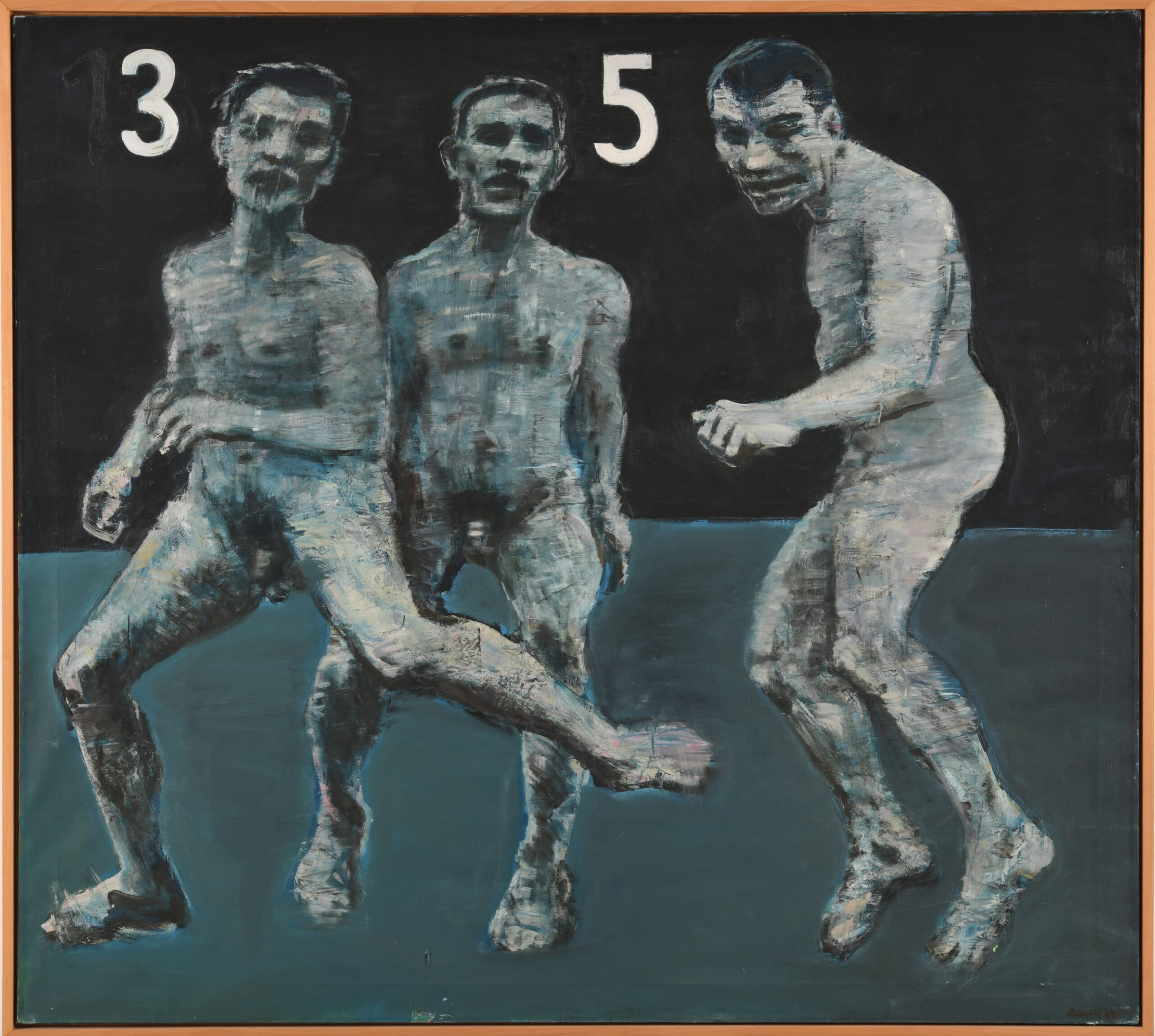
Jiří Načeradský, Štrajchpudlíci (Helpers), 1967

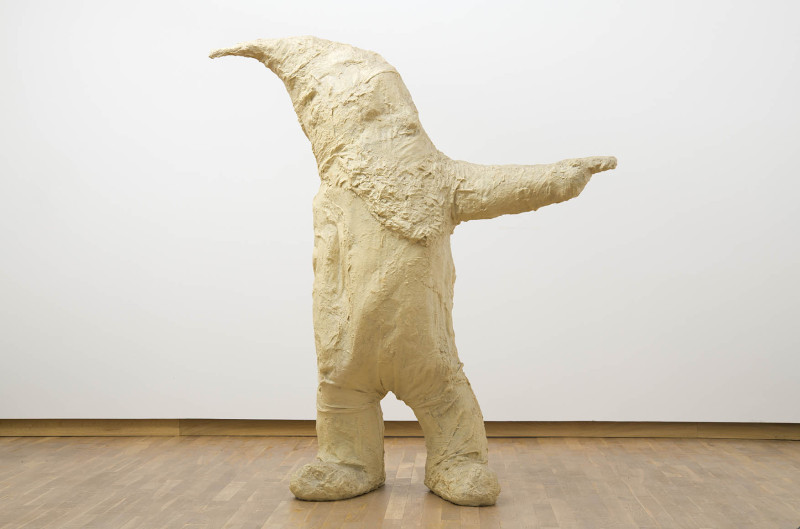
Kurt Gebauer, Dwarf monument, 1985

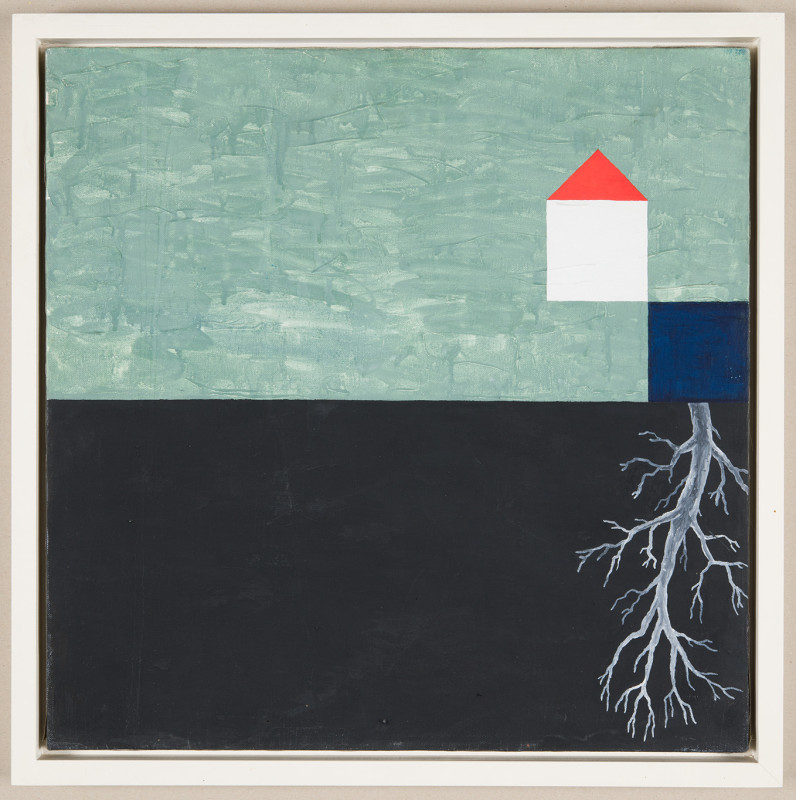
Jiří Kovanda, Step Forward, 1989

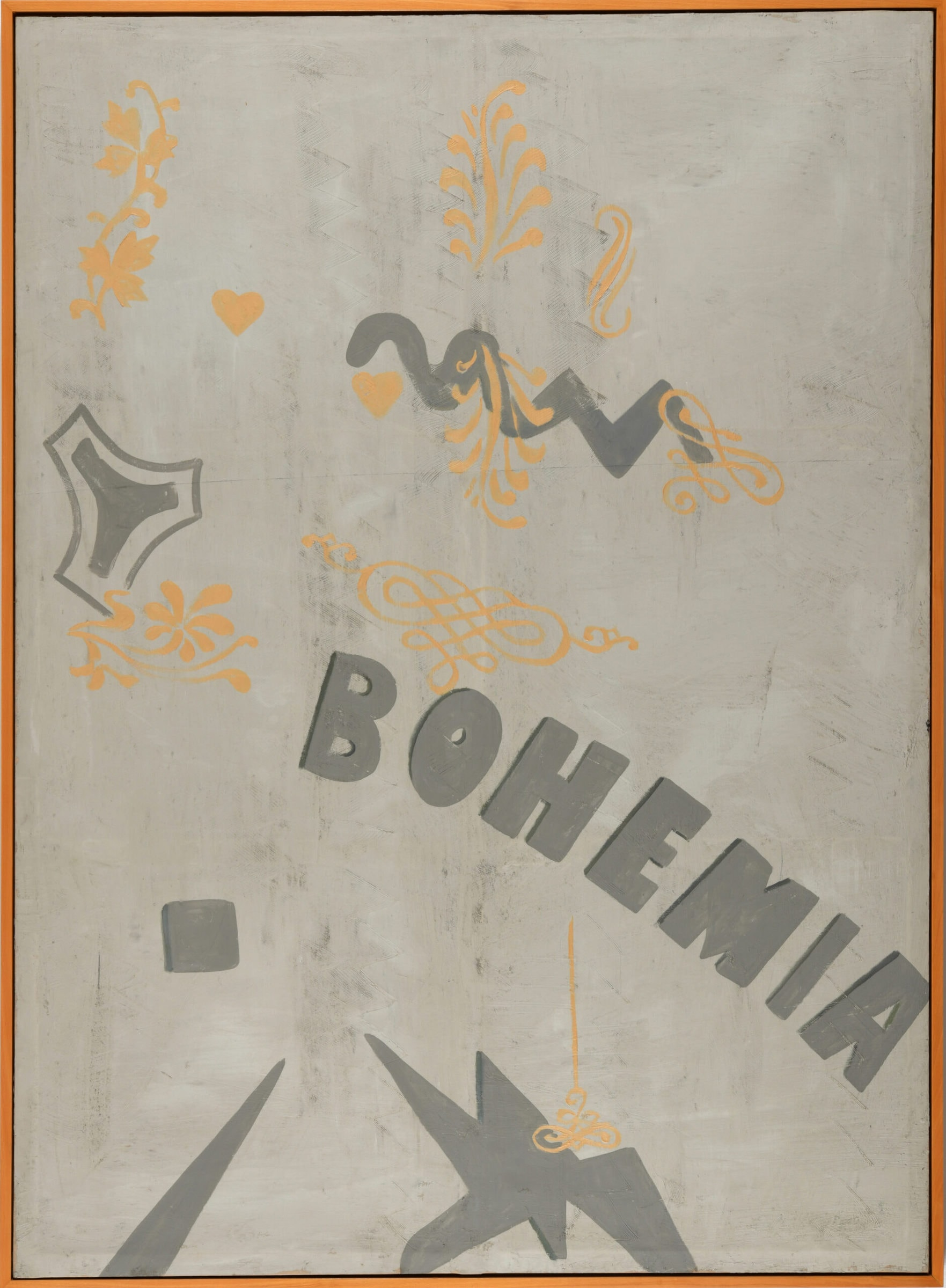
Jiří David, Bohemia, 1988

Vladimír Preclík's gift to the Hradec Králové Region is a collection of 54 works that sculptor Vladimír Preclík donated to the Hradec Králové Region in 2008. This collection, which includes the artist's work from the 1960s to his later period, is one of the centrepieces of the gallery's collection. It is complemented by portraits of Vladimír Preclík by other Czech artists.

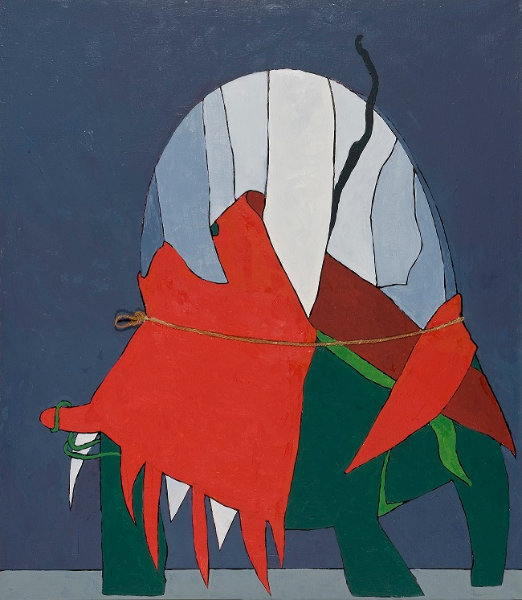
Vladimír Preclík, If the Hill Were Gone, 1999

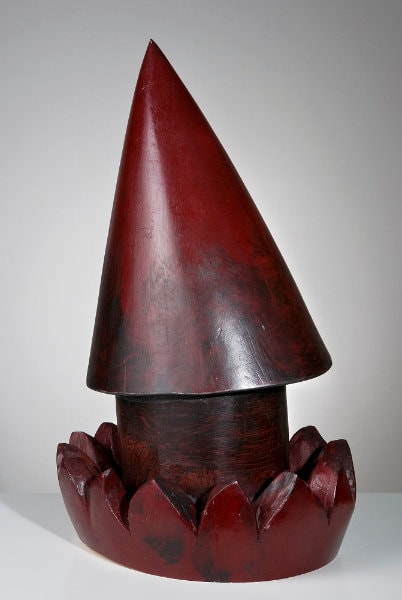
Vladimír Preclík, Thorn, 1964

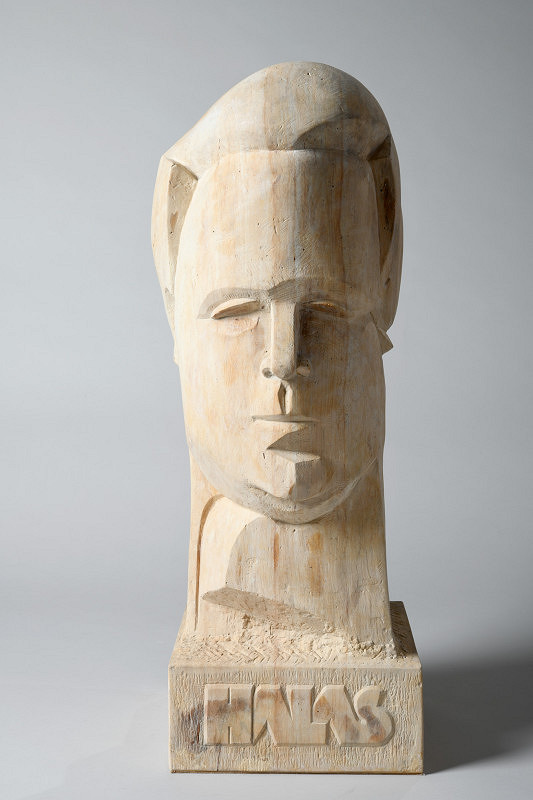
Vladimír Preclík, Portrait of František Halas, 1961

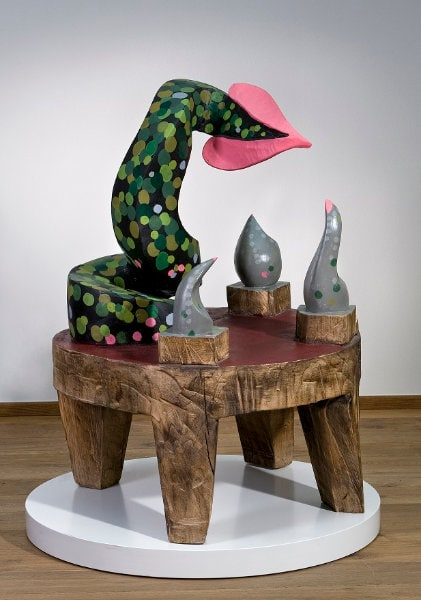
Vladimír Preclík, Dragon's Nest, 2005

The Way of the Cross in the 21st Century is a collection of fifteen monumental sculptures created between 2005 and 2008 under the leadership of Vladimír Preclík. The sculptures are located in the open countryside near the village of Stanovice. Prominent Czech sculptors participated in their creation, depicting traditional Stations of the Cross with an inventiveness corresponding to the spiritual quest of the early 21st century. The GMU promotes the collection through educational materials for the public, among other things.

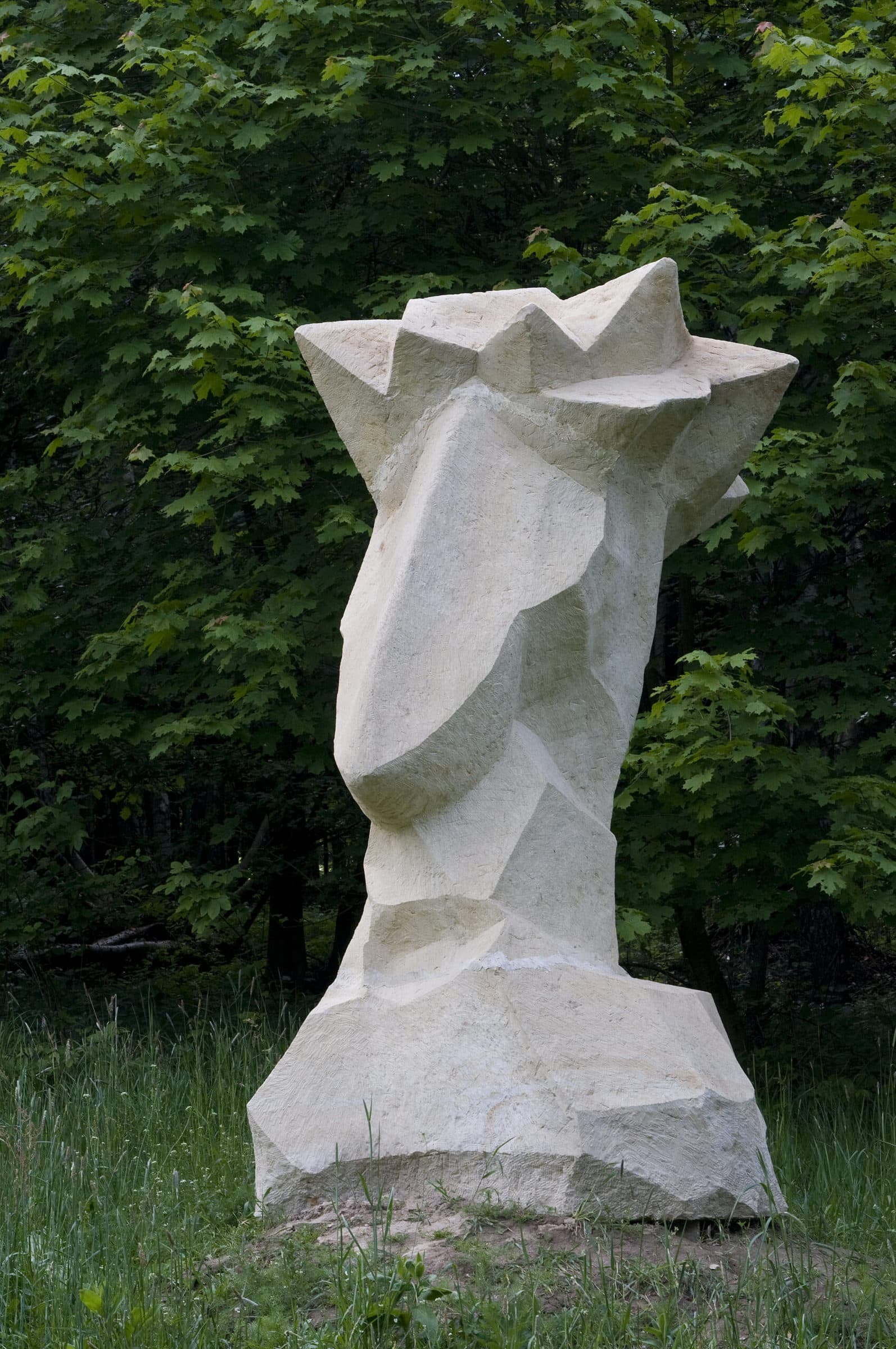
Ellen Jilemnická, Crown of Thorns, 2006

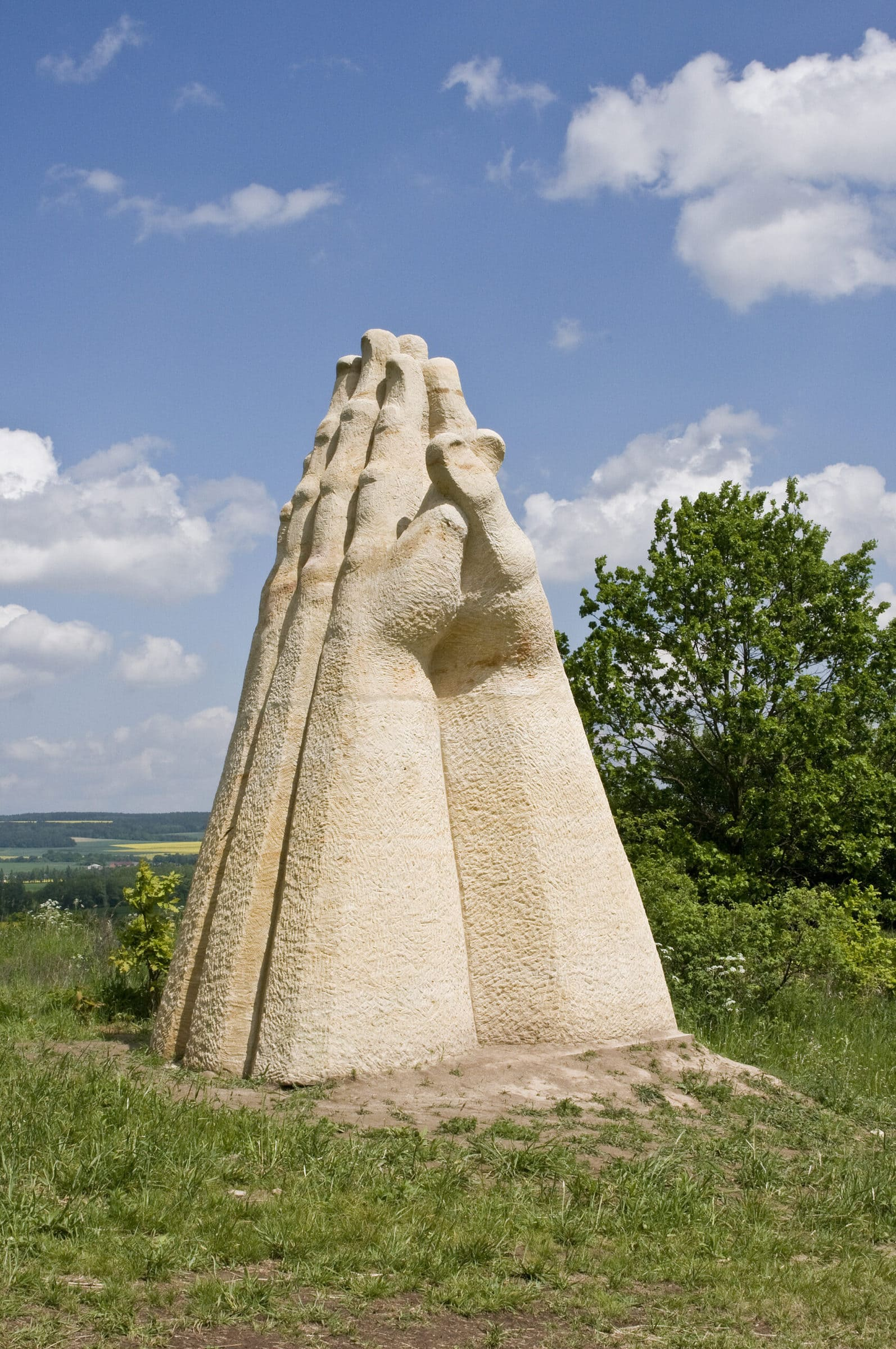
Vladimír Preclík, Cathedral of Prayer, 2008

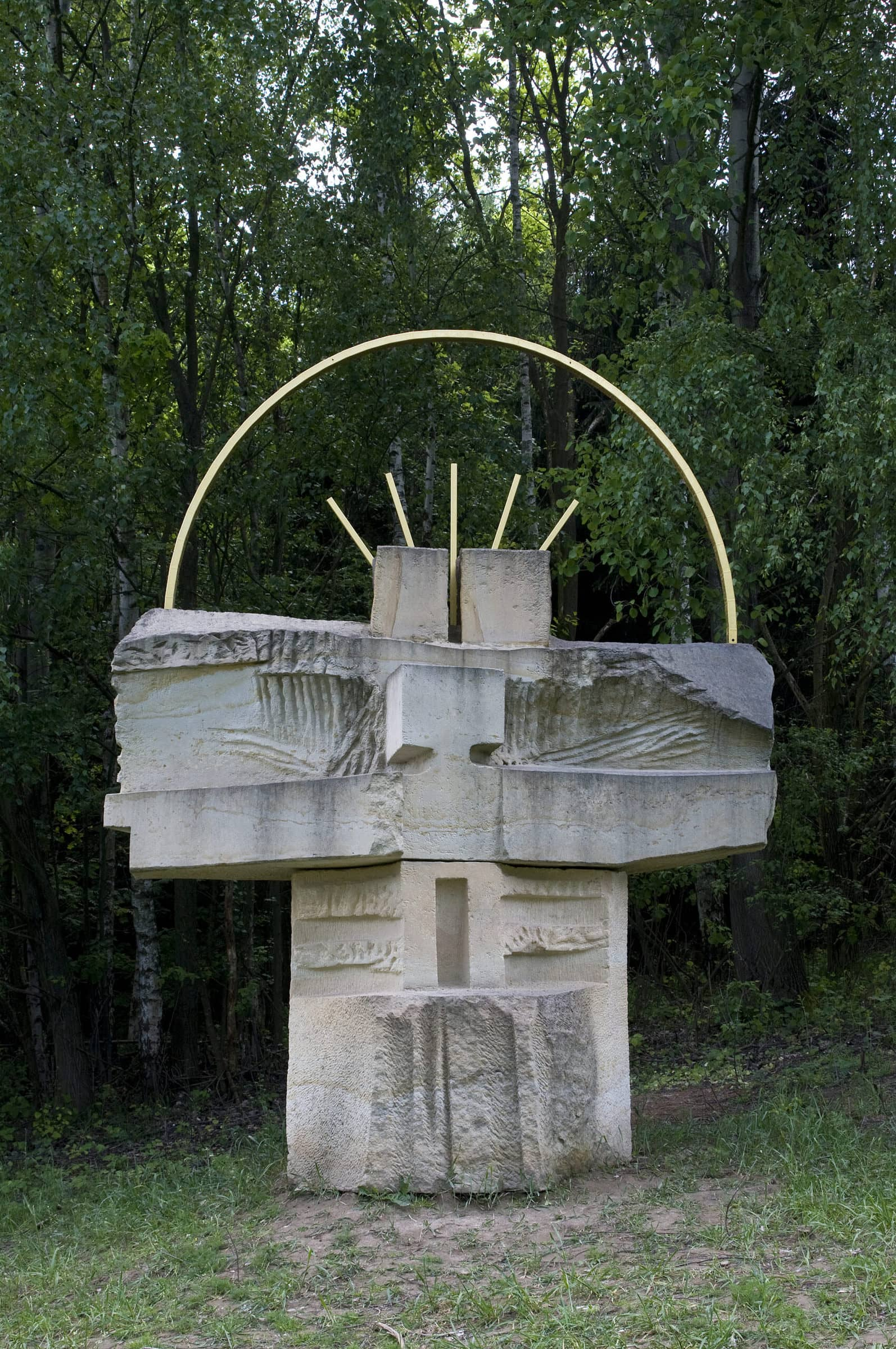
Jan Koblasa, Holy Family, 2005

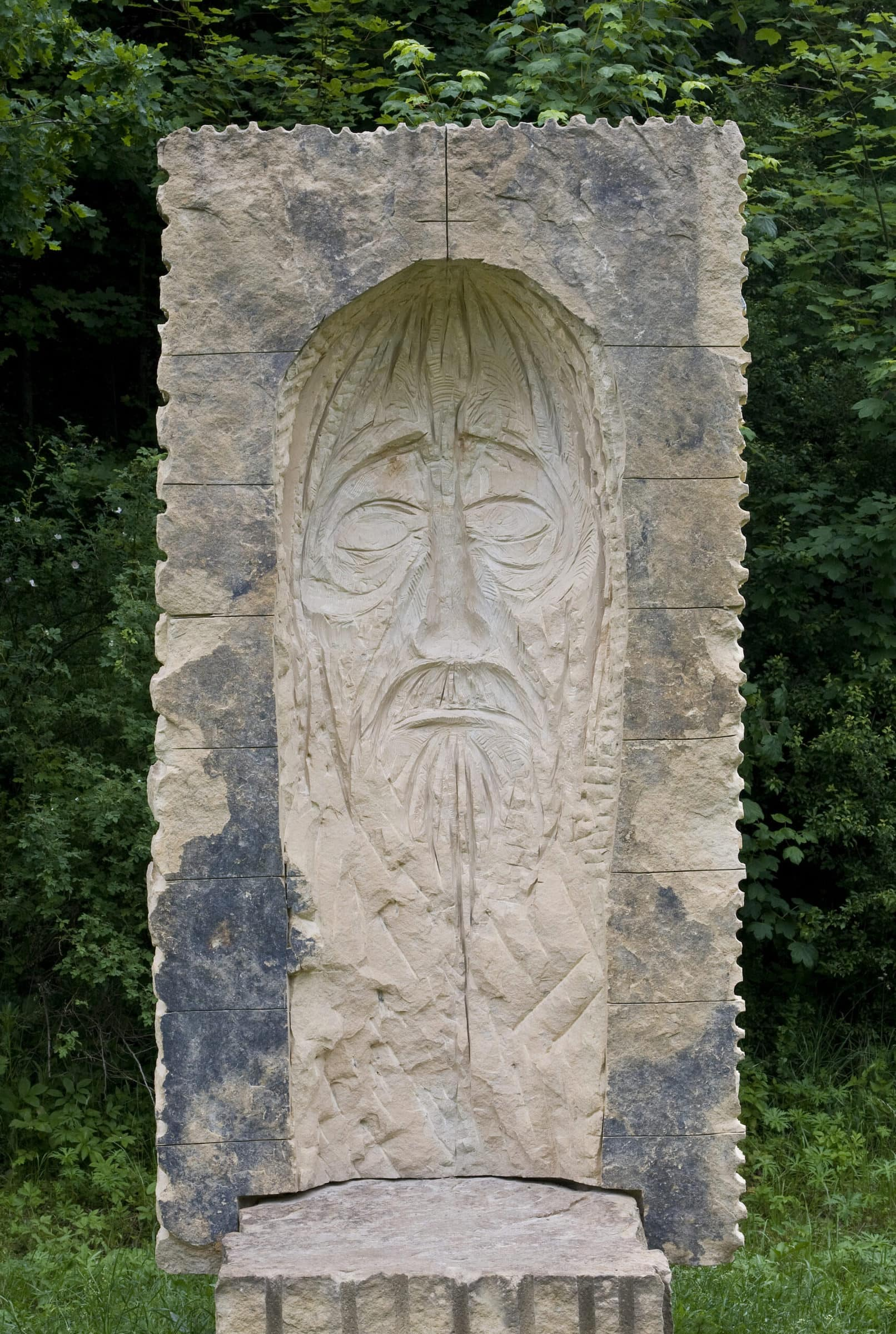
Stanislav Hanzík, Veronica's Veil, 2005
