= Memorial of the Second Resistance Movement =

Coordinates: 50°05′25″N 14°24′39″E

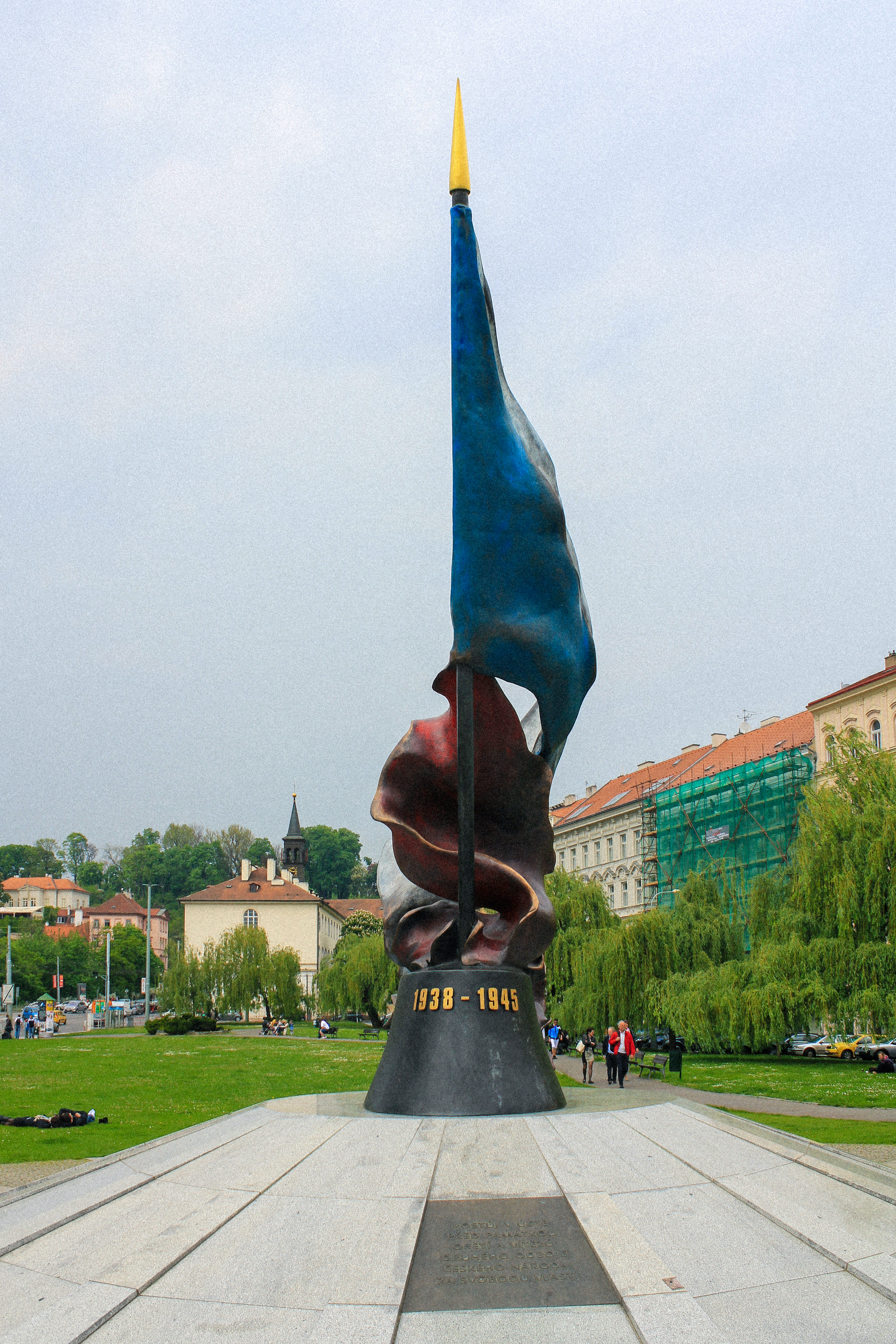

The Memorial of the Second Resistance Movement (Czech: Památník obětí a vítězů druhého odboje) or Resistance Flag Monument in Prague, Czech Republic, is a monument of the flag of the Czech Republic. It is in dedication to the second resistance movement to the Nazi occupation of the Czechoslovakia from 1938 to 1945. It has an inscription with 'Postůj v úctě před památkou obětí a vítězů druhého odboje českého národa za svobodu vlasti' in English it is ‘Stay a moment in respect for the victims and winners of the Second resistance of the Czech nation for liberty of the homeland.’

Sculptural work has been made by professor Vladimír Preclík, architectural work by architects Ivan Ruller, Martin Kareš and Robert Rais. Foundation stone for the memorial was laid on 4 May 2005.
