= František Kaván =

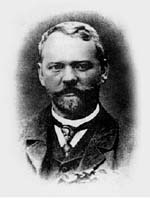
František Kaván.

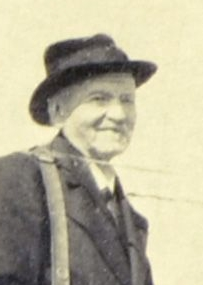
František Kaván.

František Kaván (10 September 1866, Víchovská Lhota near Jilemnice - 16 December 1941, Libuň near Jičín) was a Czech painter and poet.

Kaván studied at the gymnasium in Hradec Králové, which he finished in 1888. During 1889 to 1896 he studied painting at the academy in Prague under the guidance of Julius Mařák. He was a member of the Czechoslovak Academy of Sciences. He spent the end of his life in the area of Krkonoše, his birthplace. Kaván was a very humble and likeable person who had given away most of his paintings.

As a painter, he specialised in realistic landscapes and created over 4,000 paintings. He concentrated on the mountain areas of Krkonoše and Vysočina.

Unlike his paintings, Kaván's poems were soon forgotten. He also translated literary works from Russian.

== Paintings ==
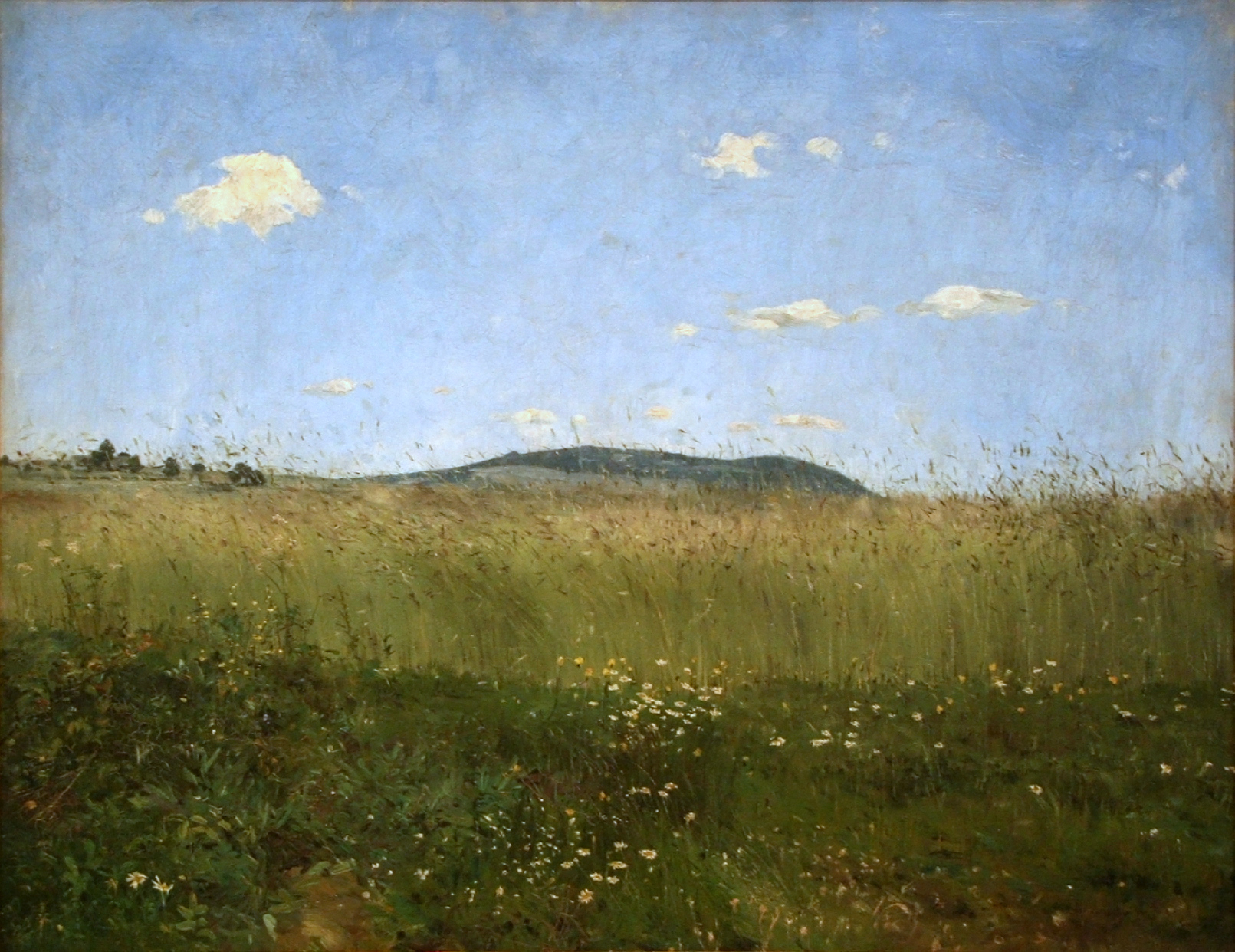
Na vzduchu domova
(1895)

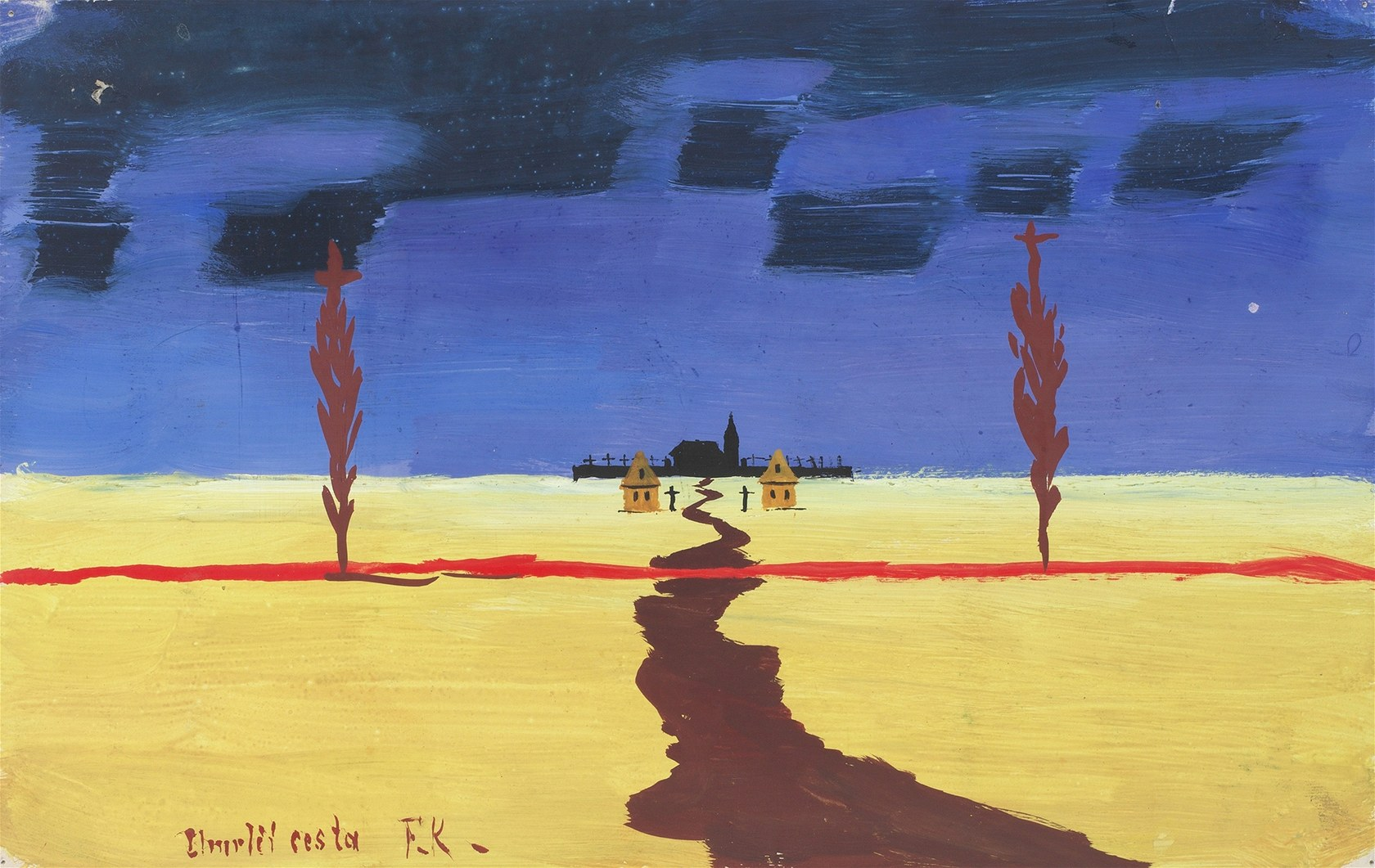
Umrlčí cesta
(1895–1896)

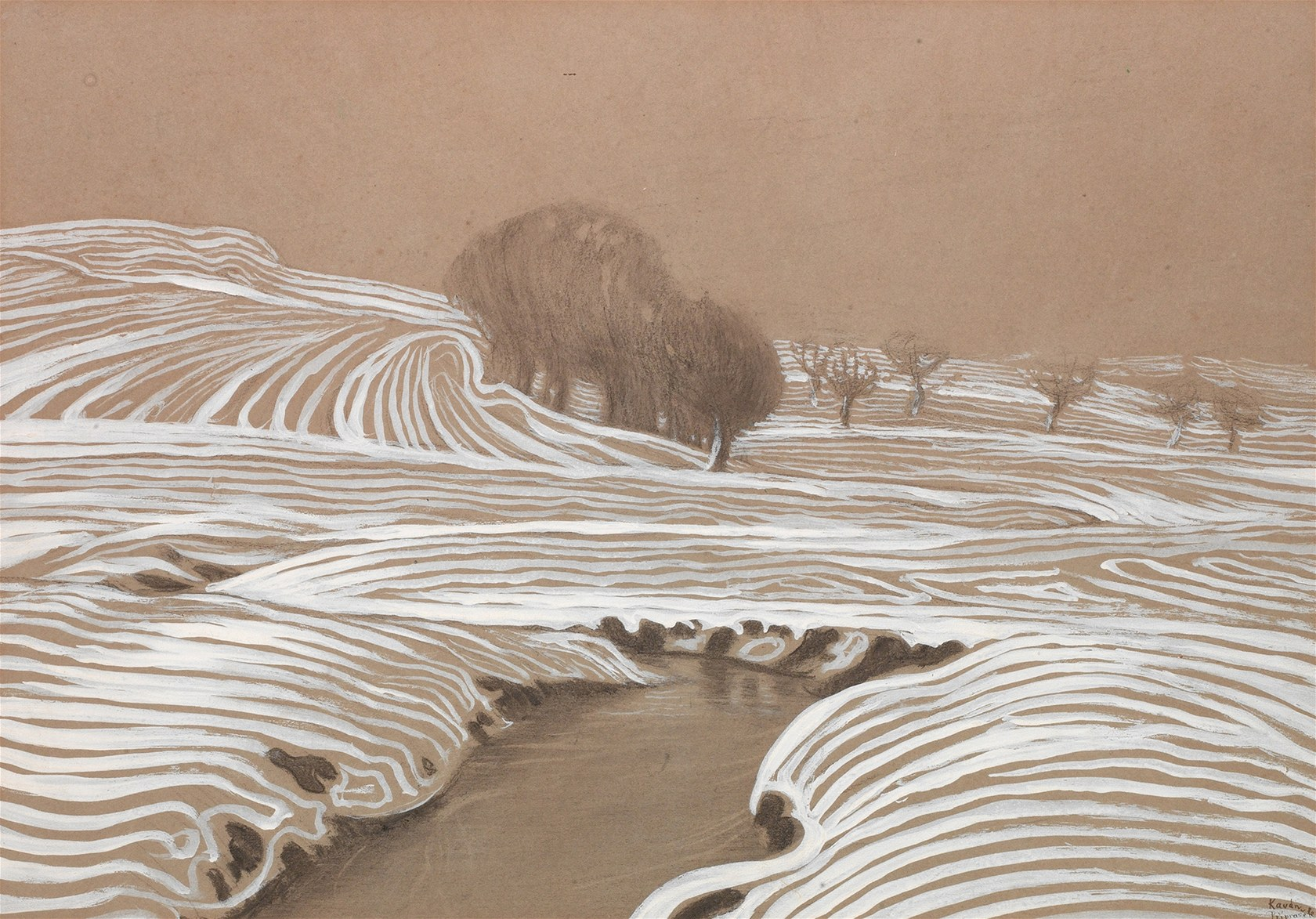
Tání – Příprašek
(1899)

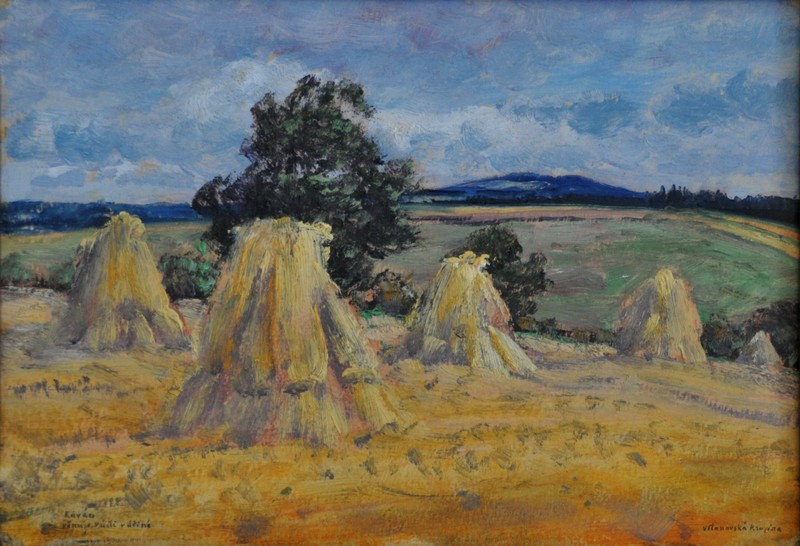
Vítanovská krajina
(after 1920)

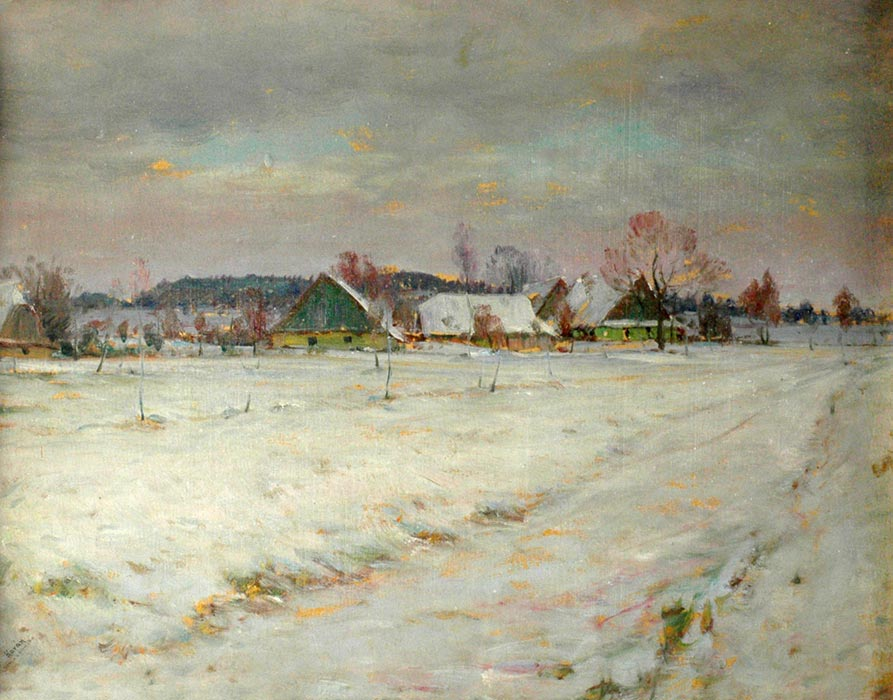
Zima u Hlinska
(date unknown)

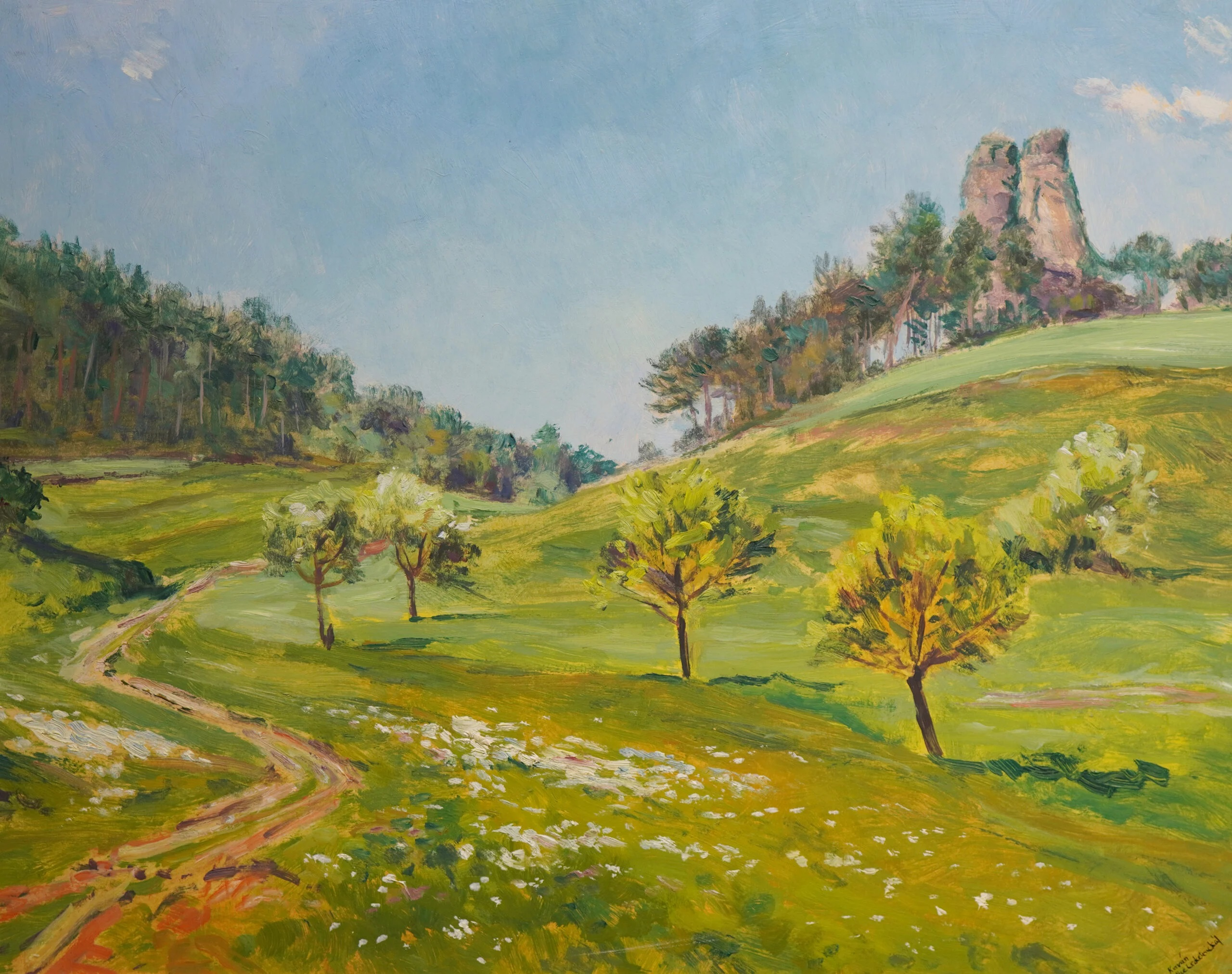
Hlavatice (roketnická)
(date unknown)
