= Libuň =

- Municipality
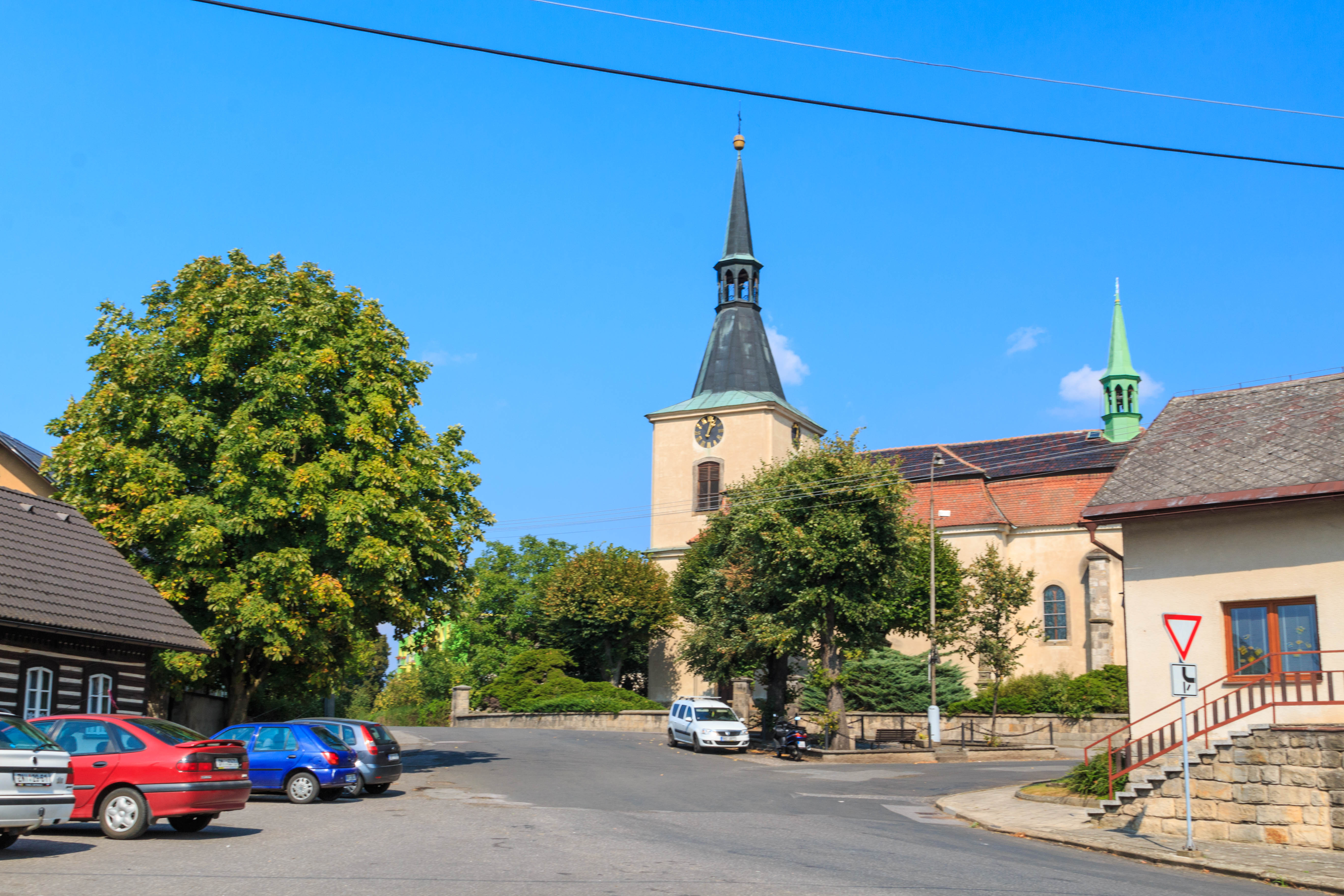
- Church of Saint Martin

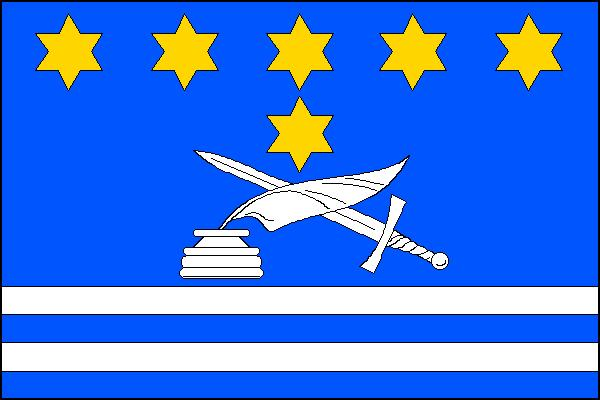
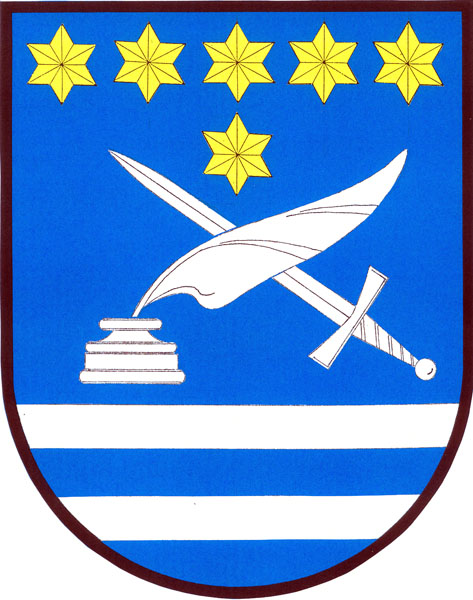
- Flag Coat of arms

- Location in the Czech Republic
- Coordinates: 50°29′54″N 15°17′55″E
- Country: Czech Republic
- Region: Hradec Králové
- District: Jičín
- First mentioned: 1369

Area
  - Total: 10.54 km^{2} (4.07 sq mi)
- Elevation: 320 m (1,050 ft)

Population (2026-01-01)
  - Total: 796
  - Density: 75.5/km^{2} (196/sq mi)
- Time zone: UTC+1 (CET)
  - Summer (DST): UTC+2 (CEST)
- Postal code: 507 15
- Website: libun.cz

Libuň is a municipality and village in Jičín District in the Hradec Králové Region of the Czech Republic. It has about 800 inhabitants.

== Administrative division ==
Libuň consists of four municipal parts (in brackets population according to the 2021 census):

- Libuň (523)
- Březka (46)
- Jivany (100)
- Libunec (100)

== Demographics ==
Historical population
Year	Pop.	±%
1869	1,081	—
1880	1,103	+2.0%
1890	1,139	+3.3%
1900	1,065	−6.5%
1910	1,050	−1.4%
1921	1,116	+6.3%
1930	1,078	−3.4%
1950	811	−24.8%
1961	820	+1.1%
1970	714	−12.9%
1980	755	+5.7%
1991	799	+5.8%
2001	742	−7.1%
2011	751	+1.2%
2021	769	+2.4%
Source: Censuses
