= Vladimír Preclík =

Czech writer and sculptor (1929–2008)

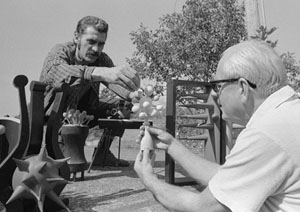
Preclík and Theodor Arenberg (1965)

Vladimír Preclík (23 May 1929 – 3 April 2008) was a Czech writer and sculptor. He was a prominent member of the Czech arts and cultural worlds for several decades.

Preclík was born on 23 May 1929 in the city of Hradec Králové in eastern Bohemia. He exhibited his sculptures internationally, including at the Expo 67 in Montreal, Canada, as part of the World Top 100 exhibition for sculptors. His works are currently housed in art galleries and private collections around the world, including Switzerland, the Czech Republic, the United States and Japan. Preclík was also an author and a member of the Czech Pen club. He was married to Zdena Fibichová.

Vladimír Preclík died at the age of 78 on 3 April 2008.
