= Fourth courtyard of Prague Castle =

Courtyard at Prague Castle, Czechia

Coordinates: 50.0902°N 14.3982°E

Fourth courtyard
- Courtyard
- {{{other_names}}}
- Čtvrté nádvoří Pražského hradu
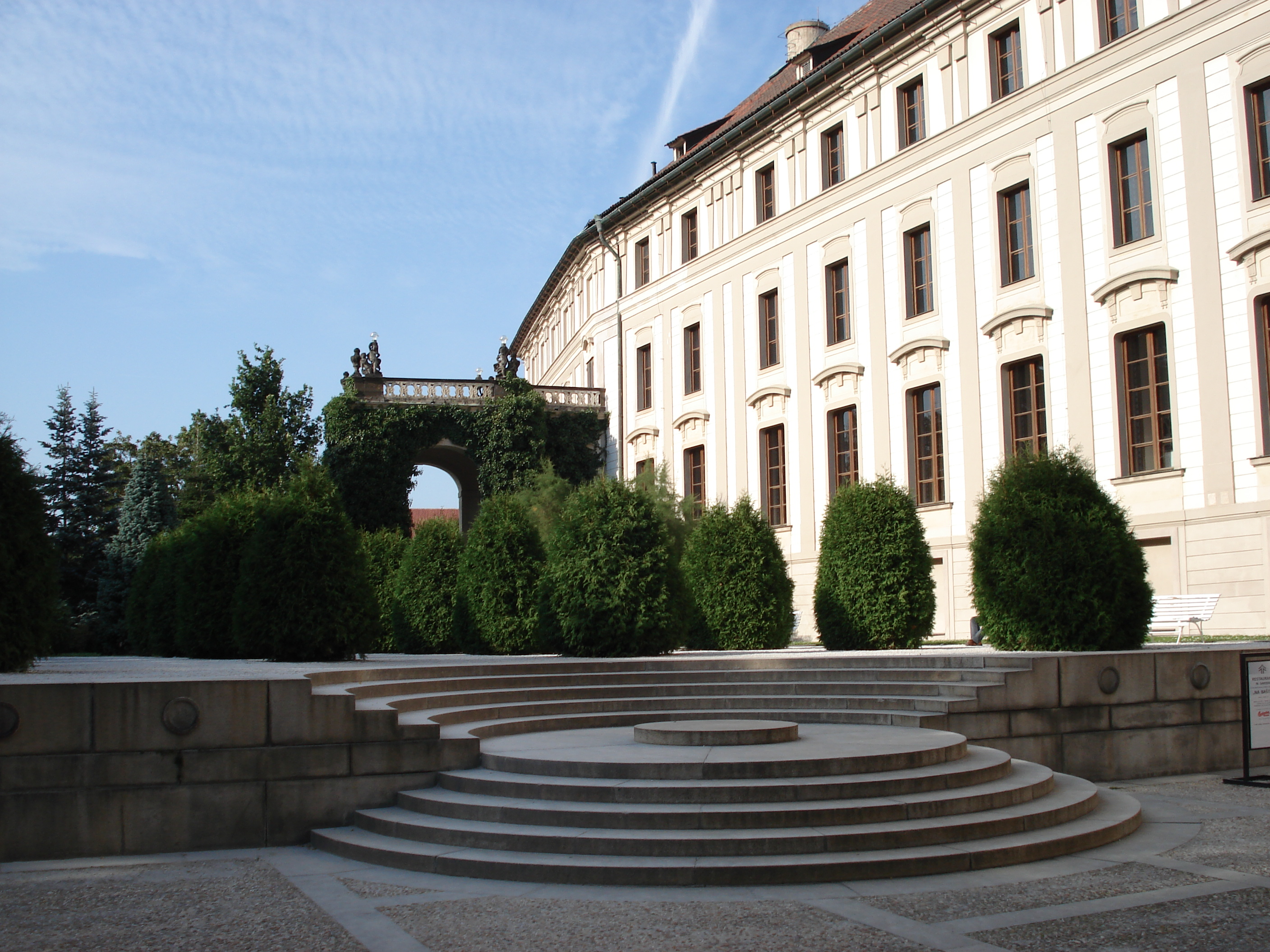
- Location: Prague Castle, Prague, Czech Republic
- Interactive map of Fourth courtyard

The fourth courtyard (Czech: Čtvrté nádvoří Pražského hradu) is one of four at Prague Castle, in Prague, Czech Republic.
