= Karmel Coast Natural Region =

Coordinates: 32°40′46″N 34°55′46″E

- Natural Region
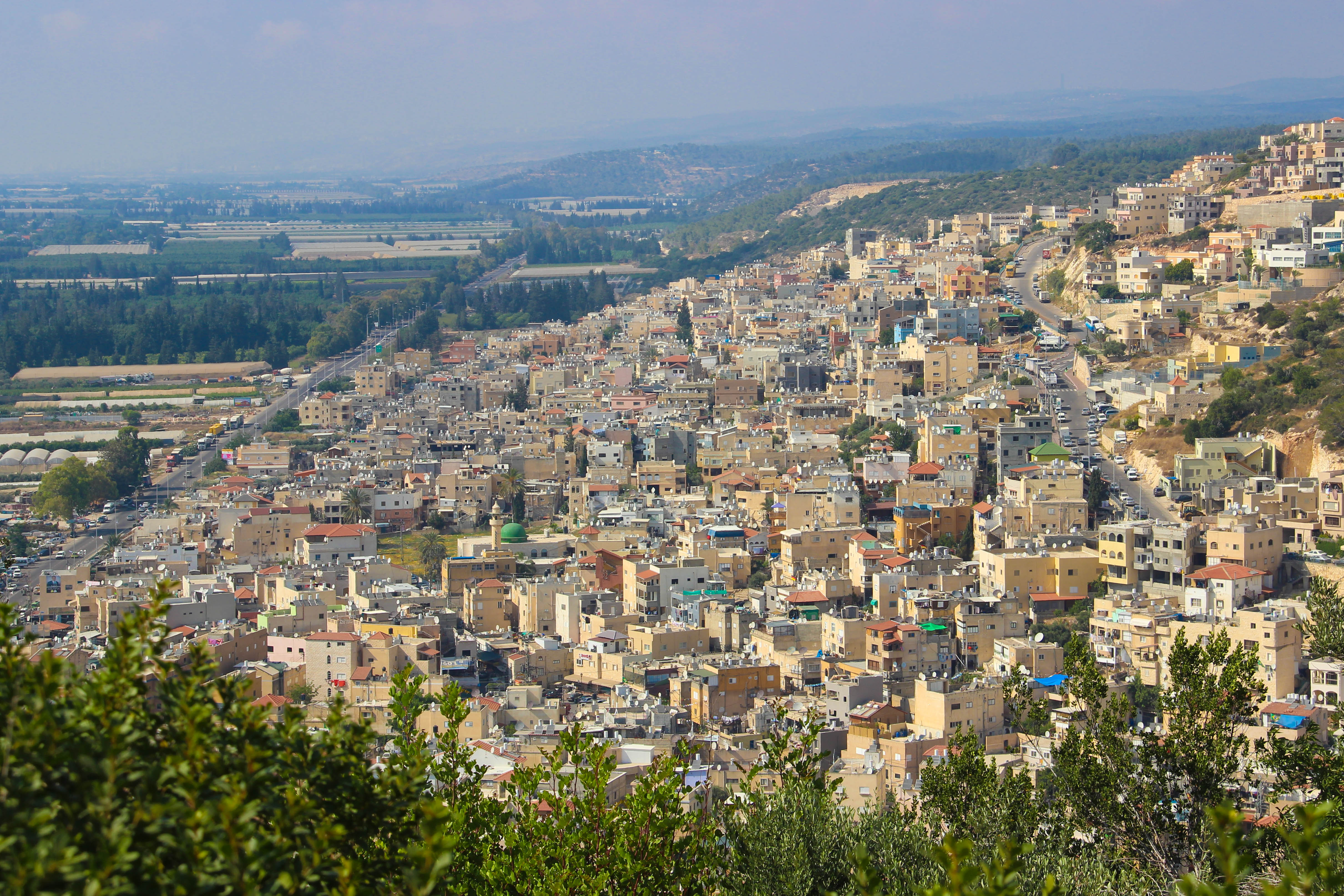
- View of Fureidis, the largest town in the Karmel Coast Natural Region
- Interactive map of Karmel Coast Natural Region
- Country: Israel
- District: Haifa
- Subdistrict: Hadera
- Largest City: Fureidis

Area
  - Total: 74 km^{2} (29 sq mi)

Population (2024)
  - Total: 36,200

Ethnicity
  - Jews and others: 60.3%
  - Arabs: 37.7%

The Karmel Coast Natural Region is a natural region in the Hadera Subdistrict, in the Haifa District of Israel. Fureidis is the largest city in the natural region.

== Geography ==
Districts, Subdistricts and Natural Regions of the State of Israel, 2018

The natural region consists of the coastal plain to the west of Mount Carmel, along the Mediterranean Sea, stretching from Kfar Gallim in the north to Ma'agan Michael in the south. It has an area of 74 km^{2}. It contains the archaeological sites of Tel Dor and Atlit, along with several beaches. The largest city in the natural region is Fureidis, which contains 37 percent of the natural region's population. The other major town in the natural region is Atlit, which contains a railway station along the coastal line. The natural region is contained entirely within the Hof HaCarmel Regional Council.

== Demographics ==
60 percent of the residents of the Karmel Coast Natural Region are Jewish. 38 percent of residents are Arab, concentrated in the town of Fureidis.

Historical population
Year	Pop.	±%
1972	9,600	—
1983	12,500	+30.2%
1995	16,400	+31.2%
2008	24,030	+46.5%
2022	34,629	+44.1%
2024	36,200	+4.5%

== Administrative local authorities ==
Cities	Local Councils	Villages
[None]	Fureidis	Hof HaCarmel: Atlit; Dor; Ein Ayala; Ein Carmel; Geva Carmel; HaBonim; HaHotrim; Kfar Gallim; Kfar Tzvi Sitrin; Ma'agan Michael; Megadim; Nahsholim; Neve Yam; Tzrufa

== Voting Patterns ==
In the 2022 election, 49 percent of voters in the natural region voted for the parties of the center-left coalition led by Yair Lapid, while 24.2 percent voted for the parties of the right-wing coalition led by Benjamin Netanyahu and 24.0 percent voted for the Arab parties.

In the 2026 election, 42 percent of voters in the natural region voted for the parties of the center-left coalition led by Gadi Eisenkot, while 37 percent voted for the Arab parties and 17 percent voted for the parties of the right-wing coalition led by Benjamin Netanyahu. An additional 2.3 percent voted for the Reservists, and 1.2 percent voted for Amcha Yisrael. Voter turnout increased 46 percent from the 2022 election.
