= Zikhron Ya'akov Natural Region =

Coordinates: 32°34′15″N 34°57′05″E

- Natural Region
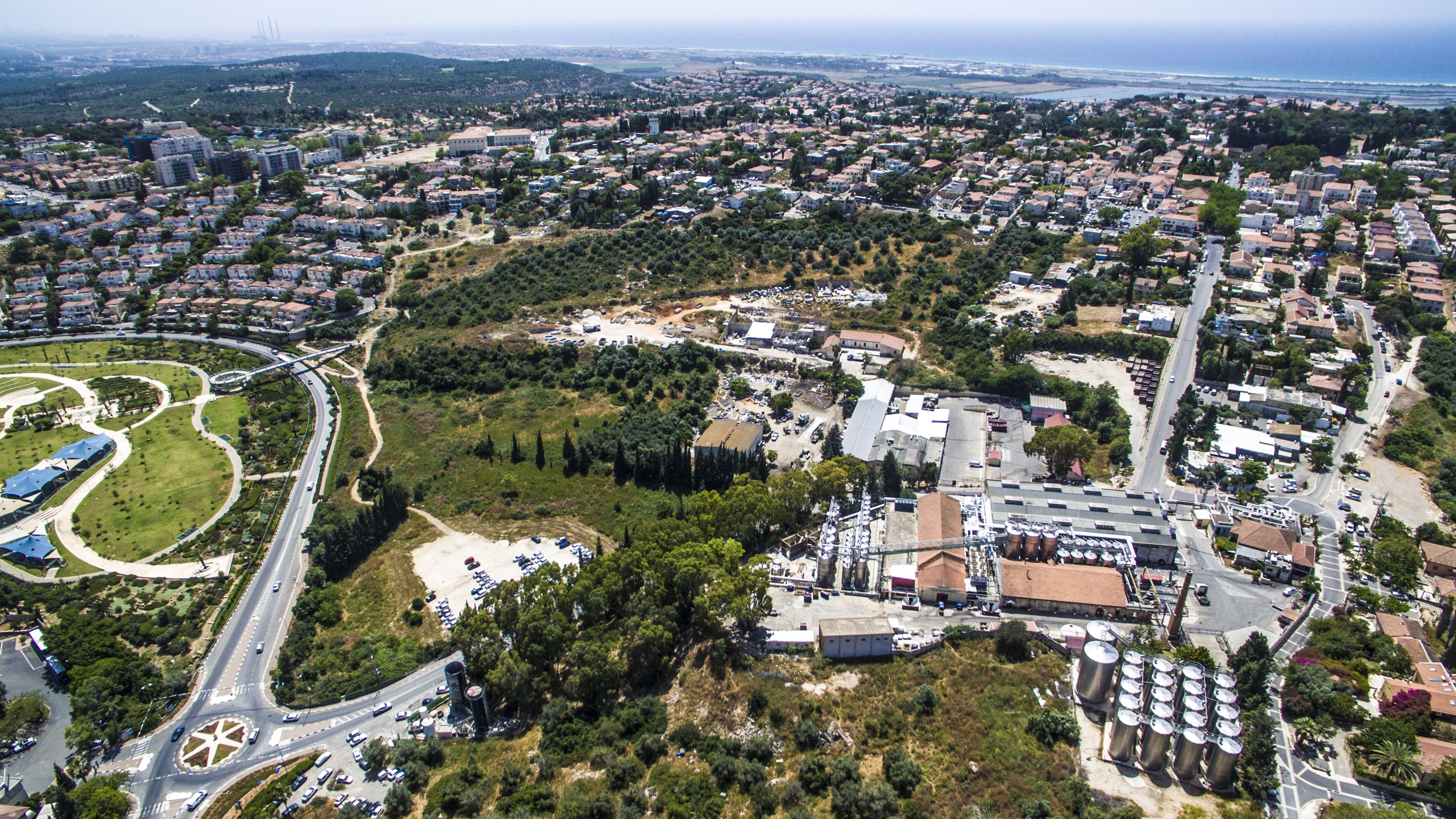
- View of Zikhron Ya'akov, the largest town in the Karmel Coast Natural Region
- Interactive map of Zikhron Ya'akov Natural Region
- Country: Israel
- District: Haifa
- Subdistrict: Hadera
- Largest City: Zikhron Ya'akov

Area
  - Total: 138 km^{2} (53 sq mi)

Population (2024)
  - Total: 29,467

Ethnicity
  - Jews and others: 96.8%
  - Arabs: 1.5%

The Zikhron Ya'akov Natural Region is a natural region in the Hadera Subdistrict, in the Haifa District of Israel. Zikhron Ya'akov is the largest city in the natural region.

== Geography ==
Districts, Subdistricts and Natural Regions of the State of Israel, 2018

The natural region consists of the southern and western hills of Mount Carmel, south of Haifa and north of Binyamina-Giv'at Ada. It has an area of 138 km^{2}. The largest city in the natural region is Zikhron Ya'akov, which contains 82 percent of the natural region's population. There are no other towns in the natural region that have more than 1,000 people. The natural region is contained entirely within the Hof HaCarmel Regional Council.

== Demographics ==
The vast majority of the residents of the Karmel Coast Natural Region are Jewish. 1.5 percent of residents are Arab, concentrated in the village of Ein Hawd.

Historical population
Year	Pop.	±%
1972	5,700	—
1983	7,100	+24.6%
1995	11,900	+67.6%
2008	22,480	+88.9%
2022	29,069	+29.3%
2024	29,467	+1.4%

== Administrative local authorities ==
Cities	Local Councils	Villages
[None]	Zikhron Ya'akov	Hof HaCarmel: Bat Shlomo; Beit Oren; Ein Hawd; Ein Hod; Kerem Maharal; Ma'ayan Tzvi; Meir Shfeya; Nir Etzion; Ofer

== Voting Patterns ==
In the 2022 election, 64 percent of voters in the natural region voted for the parties of the center-left coalition led by Yair Lapid, while 32 percent voted for the parties of the right-wing coalition led by Benjamin Netanyahu and 1 percent voted for the Arab parties.

In the 2026 election, 65 percent of voters in the natural region voted for the parties of the center-left coalition led by Gadi Eisenkot, while 28 percent voted for the parties of the right-wing coalition led by Benjamin Netanyahu and 2 percent voted for the Arab parties. An additional 3.1 percent voted for the Reservists, and 1.8 percent voted for Amcha Yisrael. Voter turnout increased 18 percent from the 2022 election.
