= Al-Tira, Haifa =

al-Tira الطيرة Tirat al-Lawz, Tirat Haifa
- Etymology: The Fortress
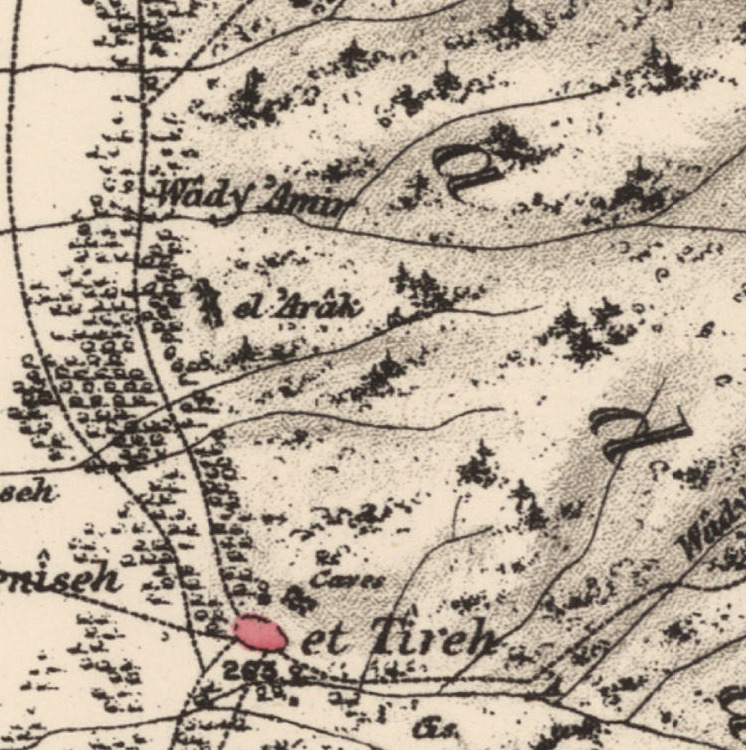
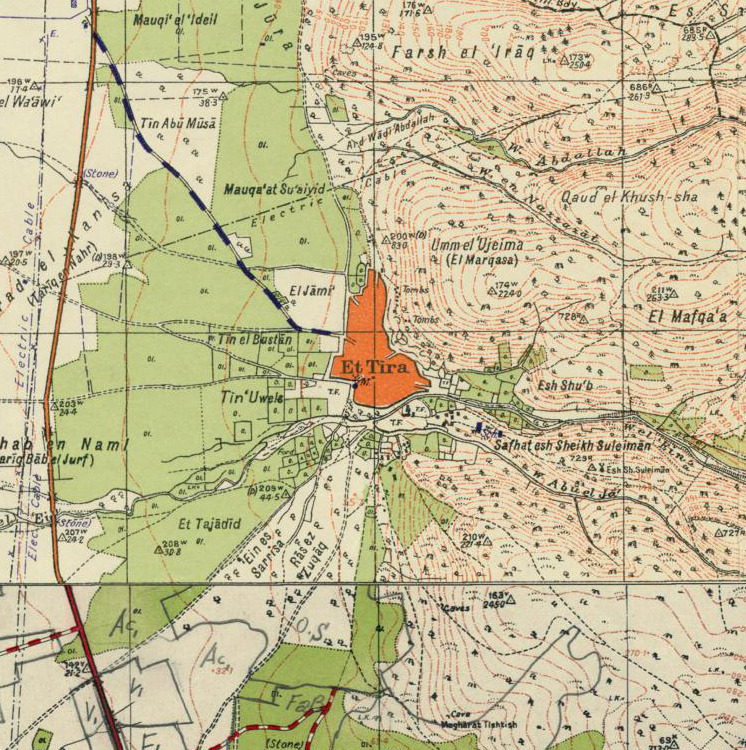
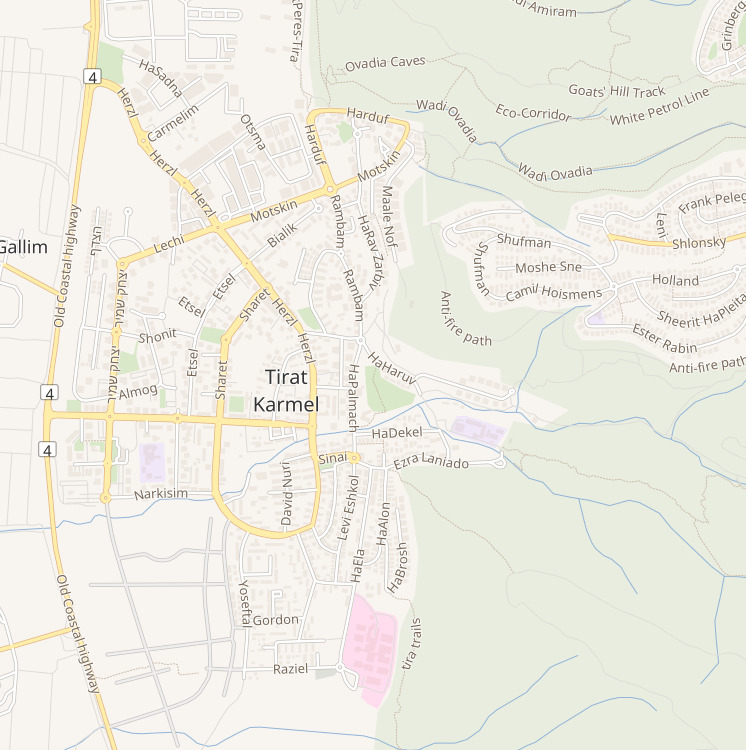
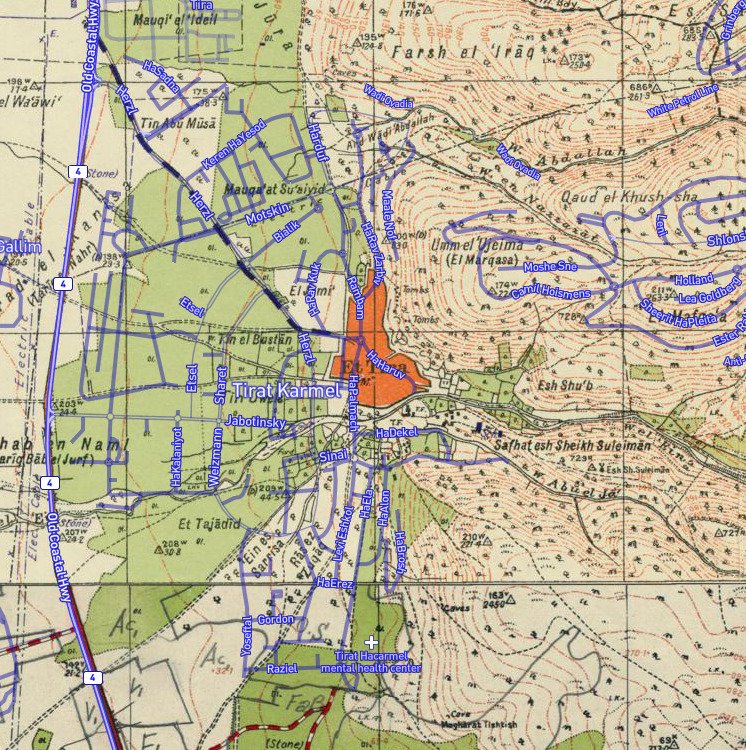
- 1870s map 1940s map modern map 1940s with modern overlay map A series of historical maps of the area around Al-Tira, Haifa (click the buttons)

- Location within Mandatory Palestine
- Coordinates: 32°45′43″N 34°58′31″E
- Palestine grid: 148/240
- Geopolitical entity: Mandatory Palestine
- Subdistrict: Haifa
- Date of depopulation: 16 July 1948

Area
  - Total: 45,262 dunams (45.262 km^{2}; 17.476 sq mi)

Population (1945)
  - Total: 5,270
- Cause(s) of depopulation: Military assault by Yishuv forces
- Current Localities: HaHotrim, Tirat Carmel, Megadim, Kfar Galim, Kfar Tzvi Sitrin

See Tira for other sites with similar names.

al-Tira (Arabic: الطيرة, also called Tirat al-Lawz ("Tira of the almonds"), Tirat al-Karmil ("Tira of Mt. Carmel) or Tirat Haifa to distinguish it from other sites called al-Tiras) was a Palestinian town located 7 kilometres south of Haifa. It was made up of five khirbes, including Khirbat al-Dayr where lie the ruins of St. Brocardus monastery and a cave complex with vaulted tunnels.

The town’s inhabitants were expelled during the Nakba, and the Israeli town Tirat Carmel was founded on its lands in 1949.

== History ==
Some scholars have suggested that the name Tireh reflects the town's history as the original location of Ancient Tyre.

The Crusaders called al-Tira, St. Yohan de Tire, and in the thirteenth century the village contained a Greek Orthodox abbey of St. John the Baptist. In 1283 it was mentioned as part of the domain of the Crusaders, according to the hudna between the Crusaders and the Mamluk sultan Qalawun.

=== Ottoman era ===
In 1517 the village was incorporated into the Ottoman Empire with the rest of Palestine. During the 16th and 17th centuries, Tirat al-Lauz belonged to the Turabay Emirate (1517-1683), which encompassed the Jezreel Valley, Haifa, Jenin, Beit She'an Valley, northern Jabal Nablus, Bilad al-Ruha/Ramot Menashe, and the northern part of the Sharon plain.

In 987 H. (1579 CE) it is recorded that Assaf, the sanjaqbey of al-Lajjun, built a mosque in the village.

In 1596, al-Tira was a village with a population of 52 Muslim households, an estimated 286 persons, under the administrative jurisdiction of the nahiya ("subdistrict") of Shafa, part of Sanjak Lajjun of the Ottoman Empire. Villagers paid a fixed tax-rate of 25% to the authorities for the crops that they cultivated, which included wheat, goats, beehives, and vineyards; a total of 26,000 Akçe.

Karmon suggested that it appeared in 1799 under the name of El Koneiceh (= Kh. el Keniseh) on the map that Pierre Jacotin compiled, though it was misplaced.

Victor Guérin visited in 1870, “I first examined a small mosque, which appears to have been formerly a Christian church. Aligned from west to east it has only a single nave and is terminated towards the east by an apse. One enters through a rectangular door crowned by a fine monolithic lintel. This church, which has been constructed with very regular ashlars, is covered by slightly pointed vaults, above which there is a flat terrace roof.”

After the heavy conscription imposed by the Ottomans in 1872, there was a decline in the village's prosperity, but it subsequently recovered.

A population list from about 1887 showed that Tireh had about 2,555 inhabitants; all Muslims.

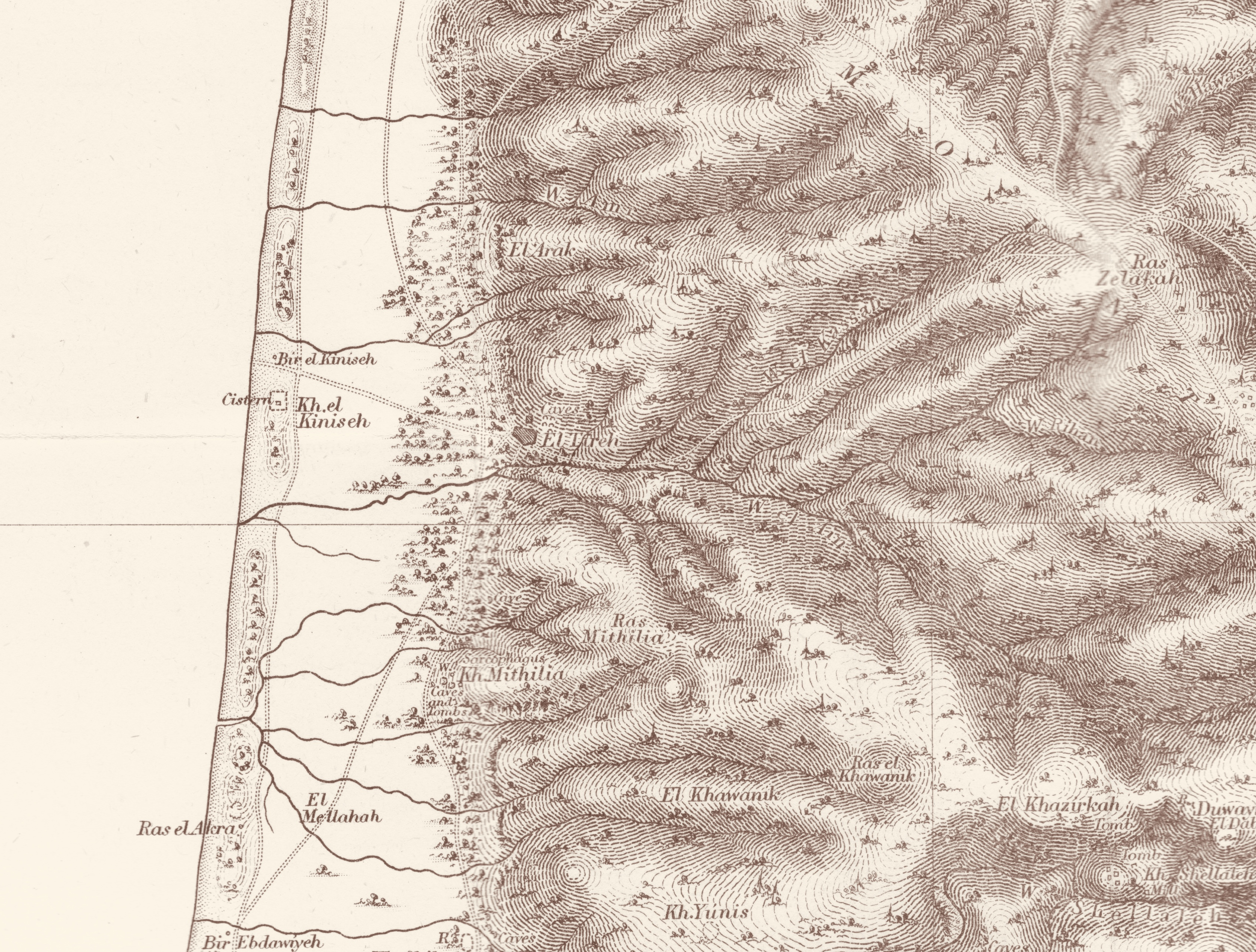
Al-Tira (El Tireh) Palestine Exploration Fund map, 1875

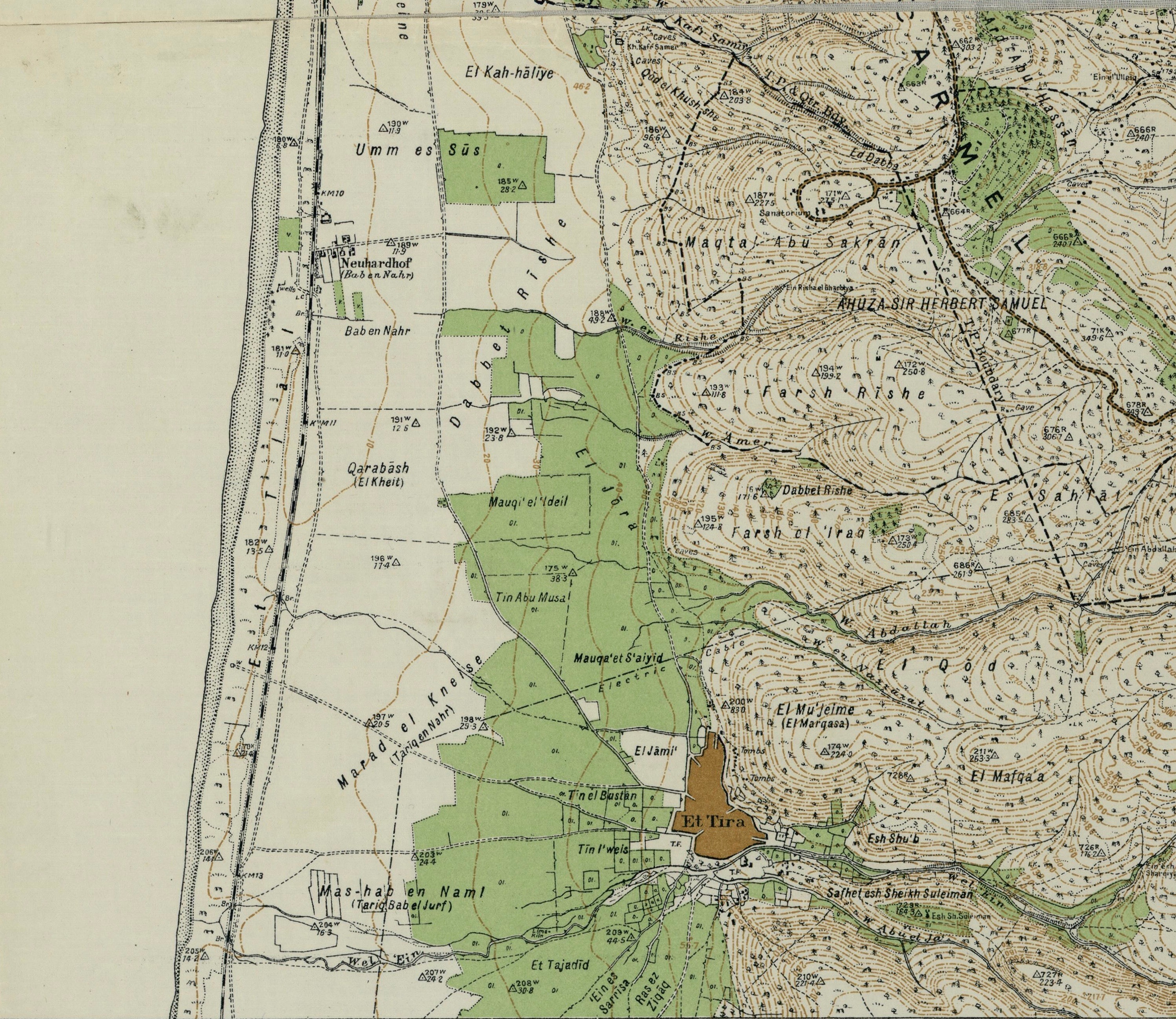
Al-Tira (Et Tira) 1932 1:20,000

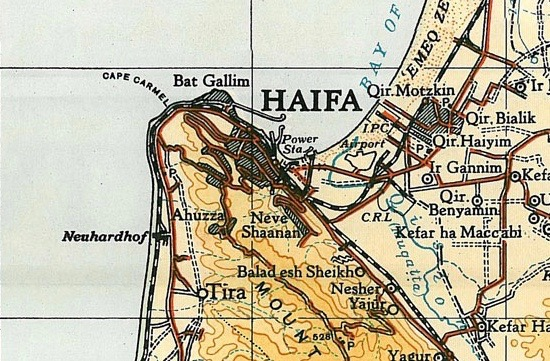
Al-Tira (Tira) 1945 1:250,000

Al-Tira had two mosques, named the Old and the New. The Old mosque was originally a church, and was already out of use by 1932. The New mosque appears to be still standing, but now converted into a synagogue. The age of the New Mosque is not agreed upon; Pringle states that it is the mosque built by Assaf in 1579 C.E. However, Petersen, who inspected it in 1994, reports that this is incorrect, and that an inscription set in an arched recess by the door to what was the entrance to the prayer hall records, in provincial nasskhi script, the construction of the mosque to Ishaq ibn Amir in 687 H. (1288-1289 CE).

=== British Mandate era ===
In the 1922 census of Palestine, conducted by the British Mandate authorities, Tireh had a population of 2,346; 2,336 Palestinian Muslims, 1 Jew and 9 Christians, where the Christians were 1 Roman Catholic and 8 Orthodox. The population had increased in the 1931 census to 3,191 people; 3,173 Muslims, 17 Christians, 1 Druze, in a total of 624 houses.

In 1943, al-Tira produced more olives and oil than any other village in the Haifa District. The abundance of almond trees in al-Tira gave rise to the village's nickname, Tirat al-Lawz ("Tira of the almonds"). By 1945, its 5,240 Muslims and 30 Christians shared two elementary schools, one for boys, the other for girls. Its economy was based on the cultivation of grain, vegetables and fruit, watered with the natural springs of the village.

By the 1945 statistics, al Tira had a population of 5,270; 30 Christians and 5,240 Muslims, with a total land area of 45,262 dunams. Of this, Palestinians used 16,219 for cereals; 3,543 dunums were irrigated or used for orchards, while a total of 901 dunams were built-up (urban) land. In addition, 6,553 dunams were owned by Jews, while 13,743 were public land.

=== 1948 ethnic cleansing ===
Shortly after the beginning of the 1948 Palestine war, on 11/12 December 1947 Tira was attacked by the terrorist organisation Irgun and thirteen residents were killed, "mainly children and the elderly" according to historian Ilan Pappé. (Note: Saleh Abdel Jawad, (2007). Zionist Massacres: the Creation of the Palestinian Refugee Problem in the 1948 War. In: Benvenisti, E., Gans, C., Hanafi, S. (eds) Israel and the Palestinian Refugees. Beiträge zum ausländischen öffentlichen Recht und Völkerrecht, vol 189. Springer, Berlin, Heidelberg. https://doi.org/10.1007/978-3-540-68161-8_3. "On 11 and 12 December 1947, the village of Tieret Haifa suffered a terror attack.") (Note: Ilan Pappé, 2006, The Ethnic Cleansing of Palestine. "massacre in Tirat Haifa on 11 December 1947", "The Irgun bombarded it [Tirat Haifa] as early as December 1947, killing thirteen people, mainly children and the elderly. After the shelling a raiding party of twenty Irgun members approached and began firing at an isolated house on the edge of the village.")

Tira was attacked by the Haganah on the night of 21–22 April 1948, causing some women and children to flee the village. At dawn on April 25, the Haganah mortared Tira, and launched an attack on the village in the early hours of 26 April. An infantry company reached the outskirts of the village but was apparently halted by fire from British units. The village's non-combat population was then evacuated by the British, leaving several hundred armed men to defend it. It fell to Israeli forces in July.

Following the war, the area was incorporated into the State of Israel and absorbed into Tirat Carmel. Tira was first settled with Jewish immigrants in February 1949; by April it had a population of 2,000. Many of Tira's refugees fled to Jordan, mostly to Irbid.

After the war, Palestinian refugees who had been displaced the town established the Wādī al-‘Ein village . The community at Wādī al-‘Ein persisted until the early 1970s, when Israeli authorities forcibly evicted the residents. This eviction was implemented to incorporate the area into the Mount Carmel National Park, which had been designated in 1960. Subsequent to the residents' removal, the dwellings in the small village were not demolished. Instead, they remain vacant up to the present day.

The Palestinian historian Walid Khalidi described the village remains in 1992: "Some of the houses, such as one belonging to 'Irsan al-Dhib, remain standing. The cemetery is unkempt and there are several broken gravestones. The remains of two shrines are visible and the school is used by Israeli students, both Palestinians and Jewish. There are forests and some residential houses in the mountainous part of the surrounding land."

By 2011, four books about the Palestinian village history had been published.

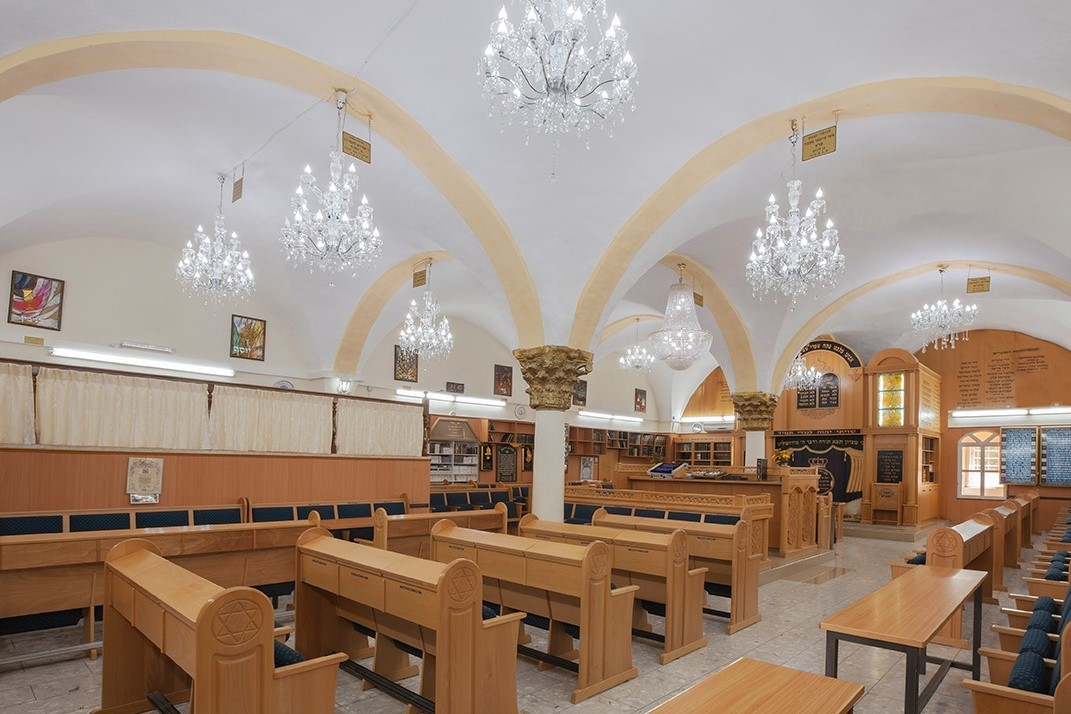
Former Mosque in Al-Tira, presently a synagogue

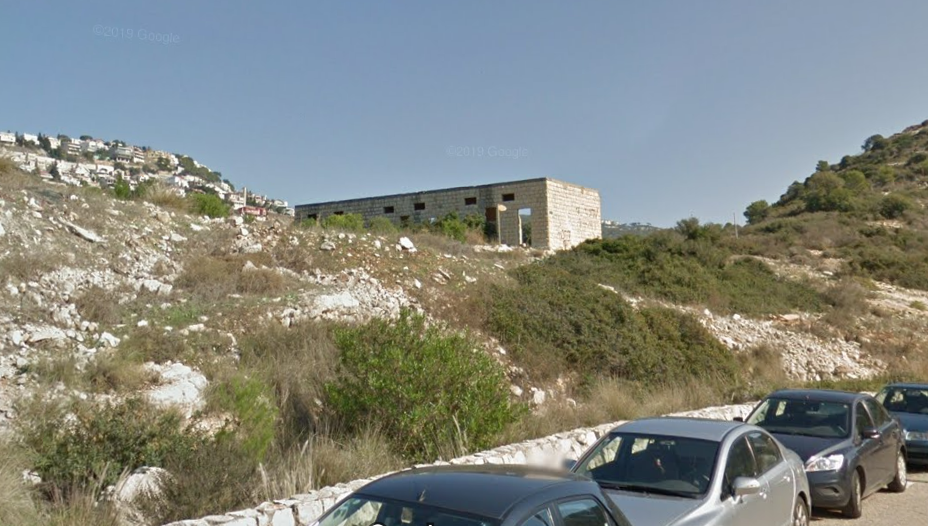
Old school building in Al-Tira, Haifa

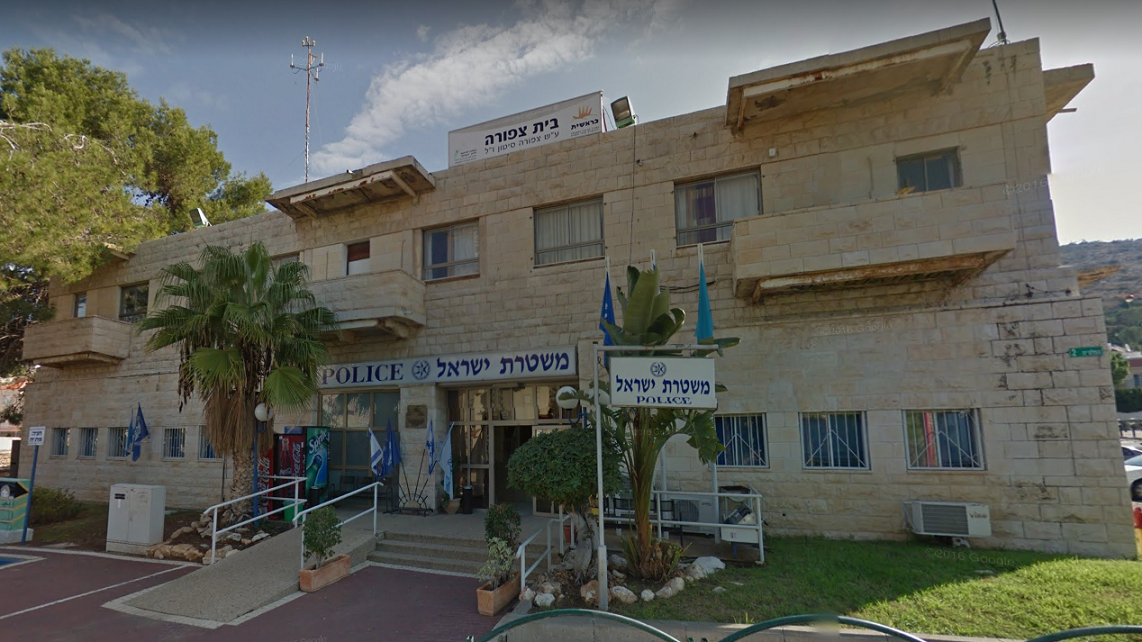
Al-Tira, Haifa, Police station

== Bibliography ==
- Barag, Dan (1979). "A new source concerning the ultimate borders of the Latin Kingdom of Jerusalem". Israel Exploration Journal. 29: 197–217.
- Barron, J. B., ed. (1923). Palestine: Report and General Abstracts of the Census of 1922. Government of Palestine.
- Conder, C. R.; Kitchener, H.H. (1881). The Survey of Western Palestine: Memoirs of the Topography, Orography, Hydrography, and Archaeology. Vol. 1. London: Committee of the Palestine Exploration Fund.
- Dauphin, C. (1998). La Palestine byzantine, Peuplement et Populations. BAR International Series 726 (in French). Vol. III : Catalogue. Oxford: Archeopress. ISBN 0-860549-05-4.
- Davis, Rochelle (2011). Palestinian Village Histories: Geographies of the Displaced. Stanford: Stanford University Press. ISBN 978-0-8047-7313-3.
- El Salman, Mahmoud (Winter 2003). "The Use of the [q] Variant in the Arabic Dialect of Tirat Haifa". Anthropological Linguistics. 45 (4): 413–425. JSTOR 30028910.
- Department of Statistics (1945). Village Statistics, April, 1945. Government of Palestine.
- Guérin, V. (1875). Description Géographique Historique et Archéologique de la Palestine (in French). Vol. 2: Samarie, pt. 2. Paris: L'Imprimerie Nationale.
- Hadawi, S. (1970). Village Statistics of 1945: A Classification of Land and Area ownership in Palestine. Palestine Liberation Organization Research Center. Archived from the original on 2018-12-08.
- Heyd, Uriel (1960): Ottoman Documents on Palestine, 1552-1615, Oxford University Press, Oxford. Cited in Petersen (2001)
- Hütteroth, W.-D.; Abdulfattah, K. (1977). Historical Geography of Palestine, Transjordan and Southern Syria in the Late 16th Century. Erlanger Geographische Arbeiten, Sonderband 5. Erlangen, Germany: Vorstand der Fränkischen Geographischen Gesellschaft. ISBN 3-920405-41-2.
- Khalidi, W. (1992). All That Remains: The Palestinian Villages Occupied and Depopulated by Israel in 1948. Washington D.C.: Institute for Palestine Studies. ISBN 0-88728-224-5.
- Karmon, Y. (1960). "An Analysis of Jacotin's Map of Palestine" (PDF). Israel Exploration Journal. 10 (3): 155–173, 244–253. Archived from the original (PDF) on 2017-12-01.
- Massarwa, Abdalla (2012-07-18). "Tirat Carmel Final Report". Hadashot Arkheologiyot – Excavations and Surveys in Israel (124).
- Mills, E., ed. (1932). Census of Palestine 1931. Population of Villages, Towns and Administrative Areas. Jerusalem: Government of Palestine.
- Morris, B. (2004). The Birth of the Palestinian Refugee Problem Revisited. Cambridge University Press. ISBN 978-0-521-00967-6.
- Mülinen, Eberhard Friedrich von, 1908, Beiträge zur Kenntnis des Karmels "Separateabdruck aus der Zeitschrift des Deutschen Palëstina-Vereins Band XXX (1907) Seite 117-207 und Band XXXI (1908) Seite 1-258." ("Et-Tire": p. 142 ff. )
- Palmer, E.H. (1881). The Survey of Western Palestine: Arabic and English Name Lists Collected During the Survey by Lieutenants Conder and Kitchener, R. E. Transliterated and Explained by E.H. Palmer. Committee of the Palestine Exploration Fund.
- Petersen, Andrew (2001). A Gazetteer of Buildings in Muslim Palestine (British Academy Monographs in Archaeology). Vol. 1. Oxford University Press. ISBN 978-0-19-727011-0.
- Pringle, D. (1998). The Churches of the Crusader Kingdom of Jerusalem: L-Z (excluding Tyre). Vol. II. Cambridge University Press. ISBN 0-521-39037-0. Also cited in Petersen (2001)
- Rey, E. G. (1883). Les colonies franques de Syrie aux XIIme et XIIIme siècles (in French). Paris: A. Picard. (p. 432)
- Sa‘id, ‘Abed a-Salam (2008-04-03). "Tirat Karmel Final Report". Hadashot Arkheologiyot – Excavations and Surveys in Israel (120).
- Schumacher, G. (1888). "Population list of the Liwa of Akka". Quarterly Statement - Palestine Exploration Fund. 20: 169–191.
- Segal, Orit (2006-06-04). "Tirat Karmel (A) Final Report". Hadashot Arkheologiyot – Excavations and Surveys in Israel (118).
- Segal, Orit (2006-11-19). "Tirat Karmel (B) Final Report". Hadashot Arkheologiyot – Excavations and Surveys in Israel (118).
- Segal, Orit (2007-09-11). "Tirat Karmel Final Report". Hadashot Arkheologiyot – Excavations and Surveys in Israel (119).
- Segal, Orit (2008-12-04). "Tirat Karmel Final Report". Hadashot Arkheologiyot – Excavations and Surveys in Israel (120).
- Segal, Orit (2009-02-14). "Tirat Karmel Final Report". Hadashot Arkheologiyot – Excavations and Surveys in Israel (121).
