= Ilan Tamir =

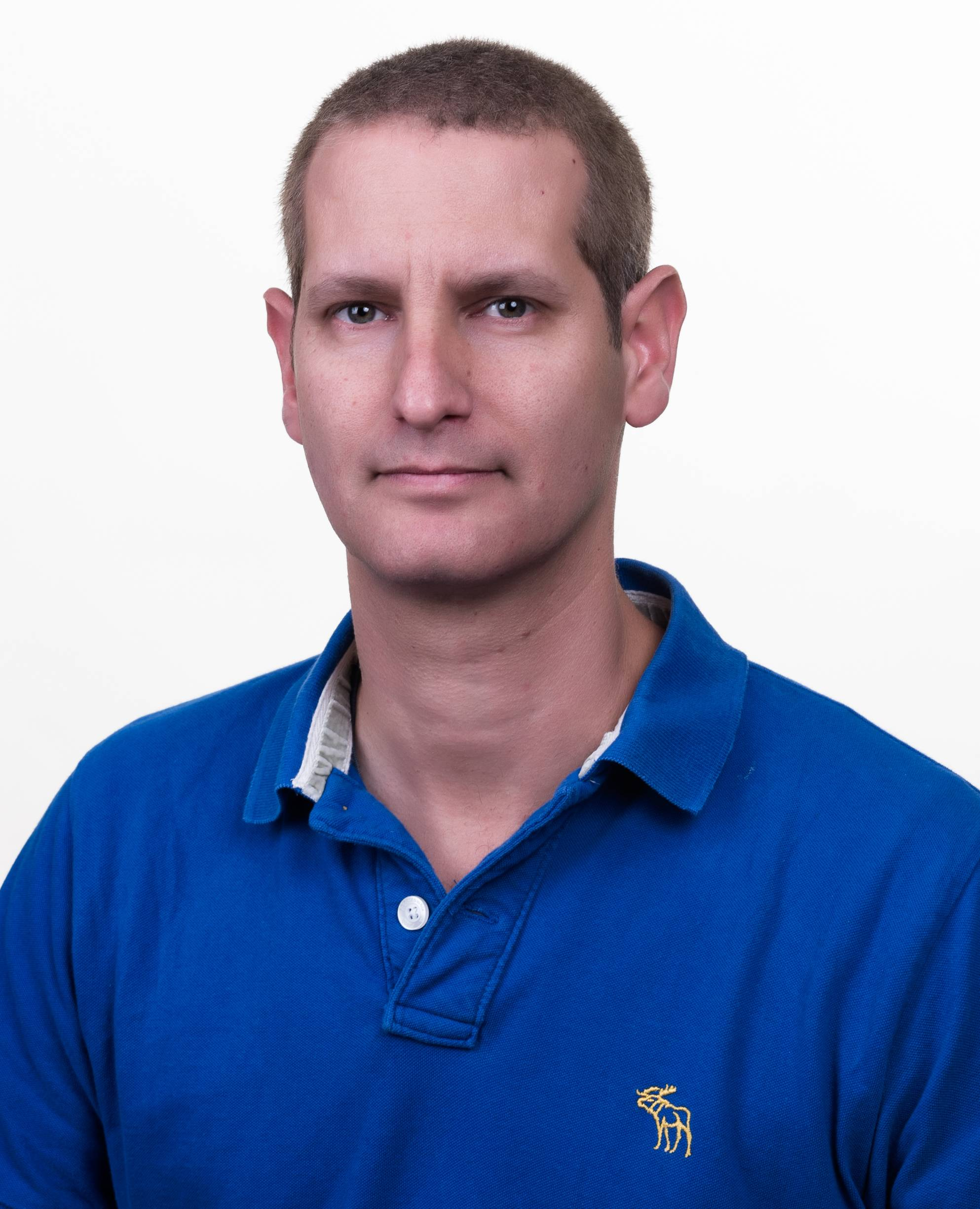
- Born: 20 September 1973 (age 52); Israel
- Education: Bar-Ilan University
- Children: 3
- Scientific career
- Fields: Communication
- Workplaces: Ariel University; Bar-Ilan University; Northeastern University; Harvard University
- Thesis: Sport, Gender and the Media (2009)
- Doctoral advisor: Rina Bogoch

Ilan Tamir (Hebrew: אילן תמיר, born: 20 September 1973) is a professor of communication and the head of the School of Communication at Ariel University (AU), specializing in sports, gender and the media

== Early life and education ==
Ilan Tamir was born and raised in kibbutz Beit Oren, Israel, and moved with his family to Ashdod, when he was a teen. Later on he enlisted to the Shin Bet and served there for ten years. During his service, Tamir studied communication at Bar-Ilan University and received there his Bachelor's and Master's degrees (both Summa cum Laude). His Ph.D. degree was received from Bar-Ilan, in 2009. Tamir authored the thesis 'Sport, Gender and the Media' under the supervision of Prof. Rina Bogoch.

== Career ==
Tamir was a lecturer at several academic institutions: Ariel university, Bar-Ilan University, the Academic College at Wingate, and was also a visiting scholar at Northeastern University and Harvard University.

In 2014 Tamir was appointed the head of the School of Communication at Ariel University. In 2016 he was chosen as one of the 12 Inspiring lecturers by the National Union of Israeli Students, and in 2018 he became a professor at Ariel University. Tamir still teaches at Bar-Ilan as an adjunct professor.

== Research interests ==
- Sport’s media
- Sociology of sports
- Sports and technology
- Sports, gender and the media
- History of the media

== Professional work outside the university ==
- 2008- member of the Israel Communication Association.
- 2012- member of the International Association for Media and Communication Research (IAMCR).
- 2014- member of the International Communication Association (ICA).
- 2013-2017 Sports media commentator at Walla!
- 2017- Communication & Sport journal (Sage publication) - Editorial board member.

== Publications ==
=== Books ===
Galily, Y., Levy, M. & Tamir, I. (Eds.). (2015). Sport and gender in the Israeli society. Herzelya: IDC Publications (in Hebrew)

=== Selected articles ===
- Tamir, I. & Galily, Y. (2010). Women's Sports Coverage in Israel: Perception versus Reality. International Journal of Sport Communication, 3 (1), 92-112.
- Tamir, I. & Galily, Y. (2011). The Human Factor in the Historic Development of Means of Communication. The international journal of the history of sport, 28 (13), 1-19.
- Tamir, I. (2014). The Decline of Nationalism amongst Football Fans. Television and new media, 15 (8), 741-745.
- Tamir, I. & Bernstein, A. (2015). Do they even know the national Anthem? Minorities in service of the Flag – Israeli Arabs in the national football Team.Soccer & Society, 16 (5-6), 745-764.
- Tamir, I., Galily, Y. & Yarchi, M. (2016). "Here's hoping we get pummeled": Anti-Nationalist Trends Amongst Israeli Sports Fans. Journal of sport & social issues, 40 (1), 3-21.
- Tamir, I. (2018). DVR Dodgers – Sport-viewing Habits in the Face of Changing Media Reality. Time & society.
- Tamir, I. (2018). Generation 3.0: popularity of the national German Team among Israeli soccer fans. International review for the sociology of sport, 53 (3), 371–386.
- Tamir, I. (2019). “I love you kid, but...”- Intergenerational soccer fandom conflict. Men and Masculinities.
- Tamir, I. (2019). “I am grateful that God hates the Reds”: Persistent values and changing trends in Israel football chants. Sport in society.
- Tamir, I. (2019). Choosing to Stay Away: Soccer Fans’ Purposeful Avoidance of Soccer Events. Time & society, 28 (1), 231–246.
