= Nir Etzion =

Town in northern Israel

Nir Etzion: נִיר עֶצִיוֹן (Hebrew)
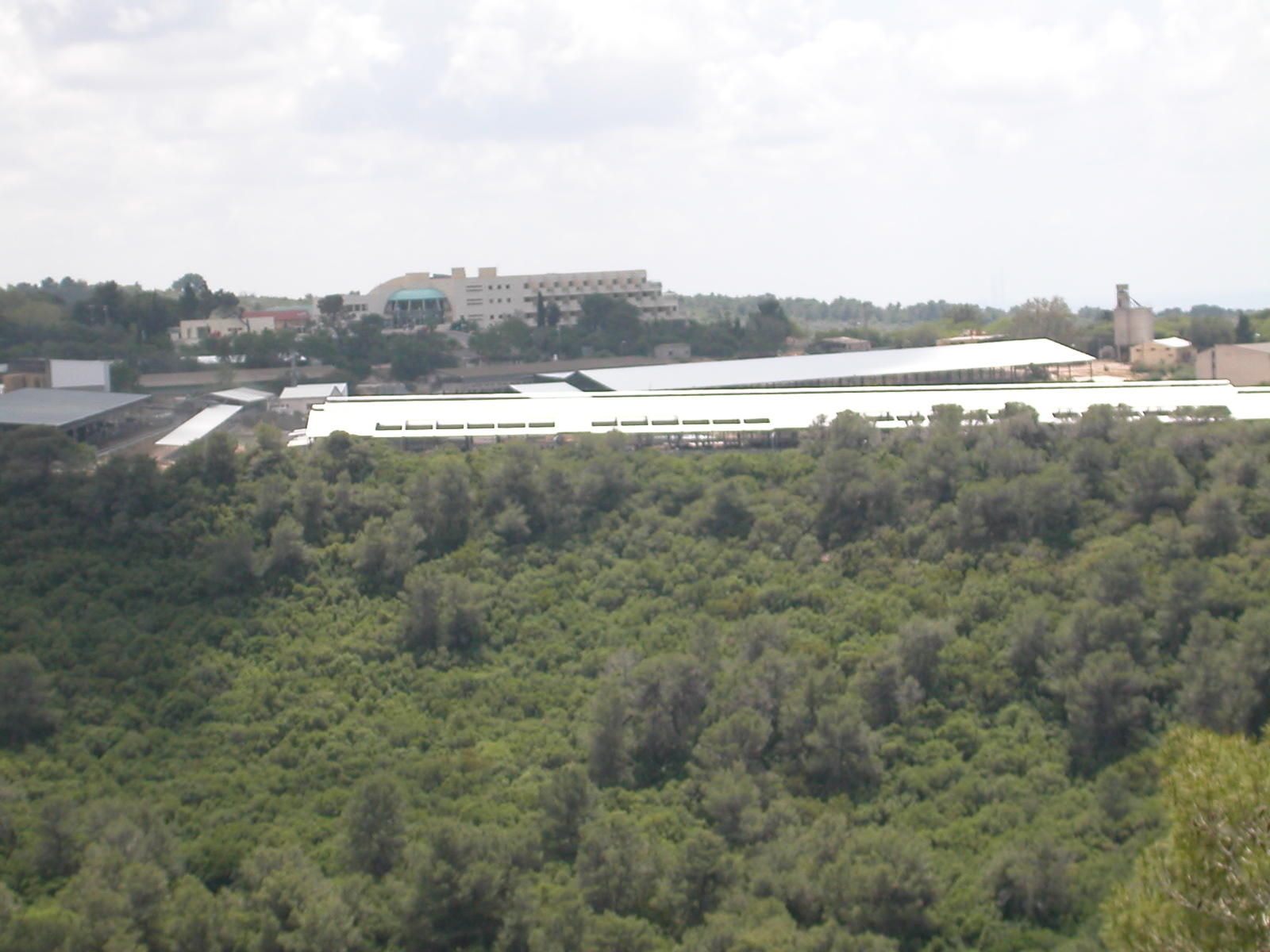
- Etymology: Etzion Meadow
- Location within Haifa region of Israel
- Coordinates: 32°41′52″N 34°59′37″E
- Country: Israel
- District: Haifa
- Subdistrict: Hadera
- Council: Hof HaCarmel
- Affiliation: Religious Kibbutz Movement
- Founded: 1950
- Founder: Refugees and Holocaust survivors
- Population (2024): 660
- Website: www.nirezion.com

Nir Etzion (Hebrew: נִיר עֶצִיוֹן, lit. 'Etzion Meadow') is a religious moshav shitufi in northern Israel. Located between Ein Hod and Ein Hawd near Atlit, at the foot of Mount Carmel, it falls under the jurisdiction of Hof HaCarmel Regional Council. In 2024 it had a population of 660.

== History ==
The village was established in 1950 as a kibbutz by refugees from Kfar Etzion and Be'erot Yitzhak (which had been captured by the Jordanian and Egyptian armies during the 1948 Arab-Israeli War), as well as Holocaust survivors and members of the Ahdut and Tikva kvutzot, on land located near the depopulated Palestinian village of Ayn Hawd. It was affiliated with Hapoel HaMizrachi.

In 1953 it converted to a moshav shitufi.

The local synagogue is named in honor of Isaac Wolfson, who contributed significantly to the construction of public buildings in the moshav. Designed by local resident Hanoch Achiman, the Torah ark's parochet is embroidered with three symbols, each representing a chapter in the moshav's history: the Holocaust, the destruction of Kfar Etzion, and the settlement on Mount Carmel. Unlike other religious kibbutzim, the community in Nir Etzion prays according to Nusach Sefard, continuing the practices that were once followed in Kfar Etzion.
