= Hof HaCarmel Regional Council =

Regional council in Israel

Coordinates: 32°36′N 35°00′E

Hof HaCarmel חוף הכרמל
- Regional council (from 1951)
- Interactive map of Hof HaCarmel
- Country: Israel
- District: Haifa
- Subdistrict: Hadera
- Natural region: Hadera, Karmel Coast, Zikhron Ya'akov

Government
  - Head of Municipality: Asif Izek

Area
  - Total: 187,360 dunams (187.36 km^{2}; 72.34 sq mi)

Population (2024)
  - Total: 35,534
  - Density: 189.66/km^{2} (491.21/sq mi)
- Website: Official website

Hof HaCarmel Regional Council (Hebrew: מועצה אזורית חוף הכרמל, Mo'atza Azorit Hof ha-Karmel, lit. Carmel Coast Regional Council) is a regional council located in the northern Israeli coastal plain. The council serves a large area, stretching from Tirat HaCarmel in the north to Caesarea in the south. Its offices are located in Ein Carmel to the south of Haifa. The head of the council is Asif Izek, elected in 2018.

== Location ==
Straddling the coast of the Mediterranean Sea to the west, the boundaries of the municipal area are:

- To the north: Haifa, Tirat HaCarmel and Zevulun Regional Council
- To the south: Hadera, Pardes Hanna-Karkur and Menashe Regional Council
- To the east: Megiddo and Jezreel Valley regional councils as well as the Wadi Ara settlements.

In the centre of the council area are the enclave towns of Binyamina, Zikhron Ya'akov, Fureidis and Jisr az-Zarqa.

== Communities ==
Hof HaCarmel Regional Council contains many different types of settlements, including eight kibbutzim, ten moshavim and two community settlements. Most of the land in the Hof HaCarmel region is owned and leased by the Israel Land Administration.

Kibbutzim

- Beit Oren
- Ein Carmel
- HaHotrim
- Ma'agan Michael
- Ma'ayan Tzvi
- Nahsholim
- Neve Yam
- Sdot Yam

Moshavim

- Bat Shlomo
- Beit Hanania
- Dor
- Ein Ayala
- Geva Carmel
- Kerem Maharal
- Megadim
- Nir Etzion
- Ofer
- Tzrufa

Community settlements

- Atlit
- Caesarea

Other villages

- Ein Hod
- Ein Hawd (Arab village)
- Kfar Galim (educational campus)
- Kfar Tzvi Sitrin (educational campus)
- Meir Shfeya (youth village)
- Sheikh Brak (unrecognized and recently abandoned Armenian village)

== Demographics ==
Historical population
Year	Pop.	±%
1972	8,200	—
1983	10,500	+28.0%
1995	13,800	+31.4%
2008	23,010	+66.7%
2022	34,463	+49.8%
2024	35,534	+3.1%

== Education ==
Educational institutes include:

- Yemin Orde (religious)
- Zvi Sitrin Village (religious)
- Meir Shfeya (youth village)
- Hof HaCarmel Comprehensive High School, in Ma'agan Michael
- Matal Hof Hacarmel - an educational therapeutic centre established in 1990 by the Board of Education and Hof HaCarmel Regional Council to deal with comprehensive diagnostic and therapy of children with special needs.

== Voting Patterns ==
In the 2022 election, 69 percent of voters in the regional council voted for the parties of the center-left coalition led by Yair Lapid, while 30 percent voted for the parties of the right-wing coalition led by Benjamin Netanyahu and 1 percent voted for the Arab parties.

In the 2026 election, 67 percent of voters in the regional council voted for the parties of the center-left coalition led by Gadi Eisenkot, while 25 percent voted for the parties of the right-wing coalition led by Benjamin Netanyahu and 1.4 percent voted for the Arab parties. An additional 3.7 percent voted for the Reservists, and 1.7 percent voted for Amcha Yisrael. Voter turnout increased 20 percent from the 2022 election.

== Sister regions ==
- New Hampshire, United States since December 2004
