= Beit Oren =

Beit Oren: בֵּית אורן (Hebrew); بيت اورن (Arabic)
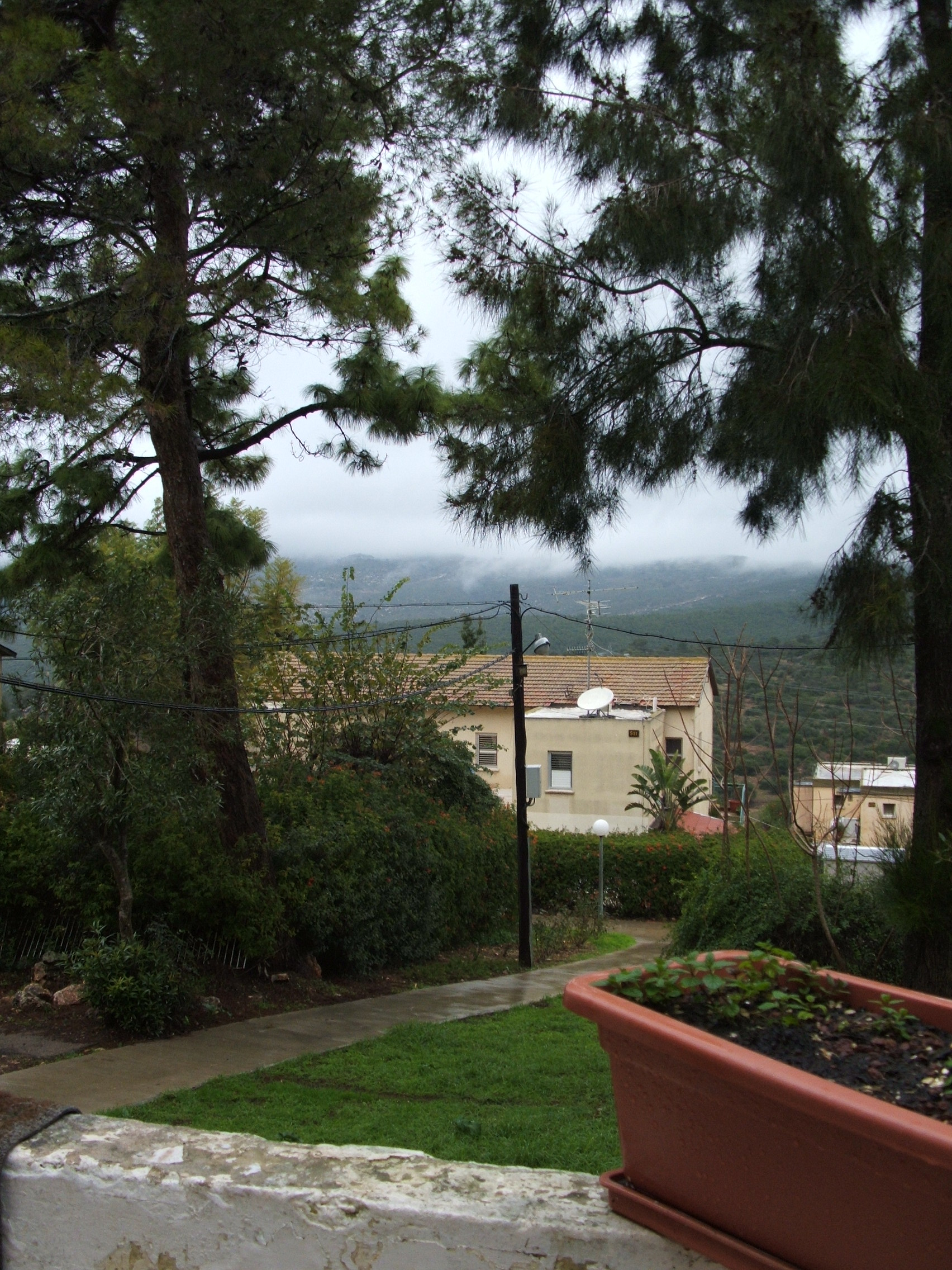
- Etymology: Home of the Pine
- Location within Haifa region of Israel Location within Israel
- Coordinates: 32°43′53″N 35°0′20″E
- Country: Israel
- District: Haifa
- Subdistrict: Hadera
- Council: Hof HaCarmel
- Affiliation: Kibbutz Movement
- Founded: 1939
- Founder: Hebrew Socialist Youth Movement members
- Population (2024): 536

Beit Oren (Hebrew: בֵּית אֹרֶן, lit. 'Home of the Pine') is a kibbutz in northern Israel on Mount Carmel. It falls under the jurisdiction of Hof HaCarmel Regional Council. In 2024 its population was 536.

== Geography ==
Beit Oren is in the heart of Carmel mountain range, next to the Carmel Nature Reserve national park, an area often called "little Switzerland".

== History ==
In 1934 a single Arab house stood on the site of what is today Beit Oren. It was purchased with the surrounding lands, settled by a group of 15 Jewish workers, and served as a watch tower and camp. The workers intended to build a city and name it Ya'arot HaCarmel, but a number were killed when the site was attacked during the 1936 Arab Revolt.

The kibbutz was founded in 1939 by immigrants from Poland and Russia, part of the Hebrew Socialist Youth movement. Over time these were joined by other groups from Dror and Aliyat HaNoar, as well as by a group from Kibbutz Ma'agan Michael.. The kibbutz is named after the pine trees that encircle it, as well as after the verse from Isaiah 44:14: "He secures it for himself among the trees of the forest. He plants a pine, and the rain nourishes it".

During the Mandate era the kibbutz served as a Palmach base for underground activities against the British. On 9 October 1945, a Palmach unit set out from Beit Oren to free 208 illegal immigrants detained at the Atlit detainee camp. After overcoming the guards, the freed immigrants were led past Beit Oren to Kibbutz Yagur, where they were hidden from the British. The attack was the first anti-British action undertaken by the Palmach.

During the 1980s Beit Oren suffered severe financial problems and many of the middle aged members left, leaving the senior members with debts and no income or means of subsistence. The kibbutz movement stopped financial support to the kibbutz, and a group of young individuals were brought in to make fundamental changes. In 1999, eight members of Beit Oren petitioned the High Court of Justice to abolish the classification of Beit Oren as a kibbutz and classify it as a community village.

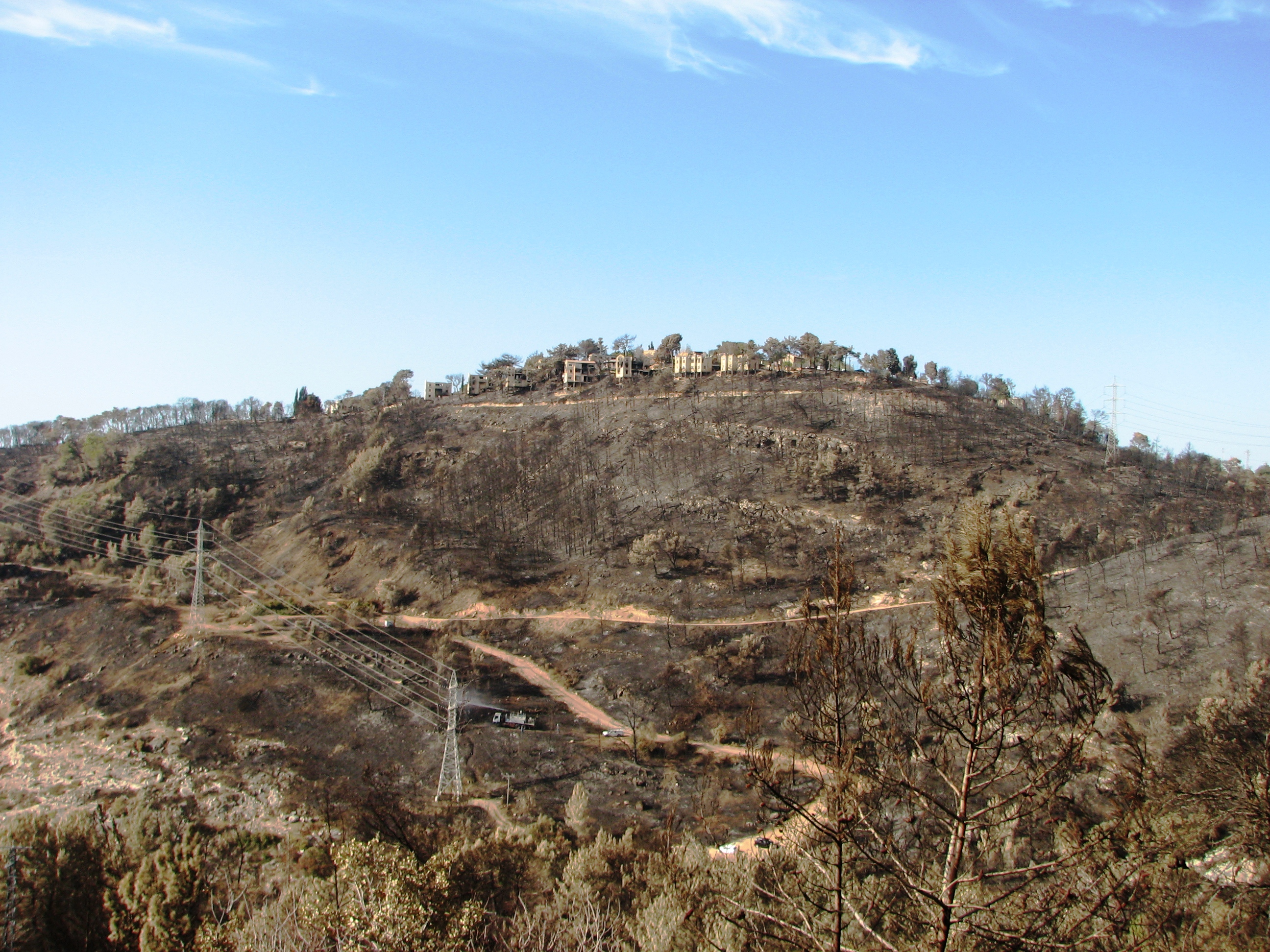
Beit Oren after 2010 fire

Beit Oren suffered extensive damage in the 2010 Israel forest fire, which claimed the lives of 41 people and burnt thousands of acres of forestland.

== Economy ==
In 1942, Beit Oren opened a guesthouse which became popular among Europeans seeking respite from the summer heat in other parts of the country. The Beit Oren Hotel, still in operation, has 30 rooms, a yoga center and a swimming pool.

== Landmarks ==
Khirbet Oren (Shalale) is an ancient city in the center of Mount Carmel, on a steep hill overlooking Oren valley. There are few remains at the site indicating that the city flourished during Hellenistic and Roman times. Canaanite findings (25th–10th centuries BC) have also been found in the area.

== Flora and fauna ==
Solomon Wasser, a professor from Haifa University has found six strains of mushroom unknown to science while hunting through the Beit Oren Forest behind the university. Wasser's research found that Cyathus striatus, one of the strains, was effective in treating pancreatic cancer in animal trials.
