= HaHotrim =

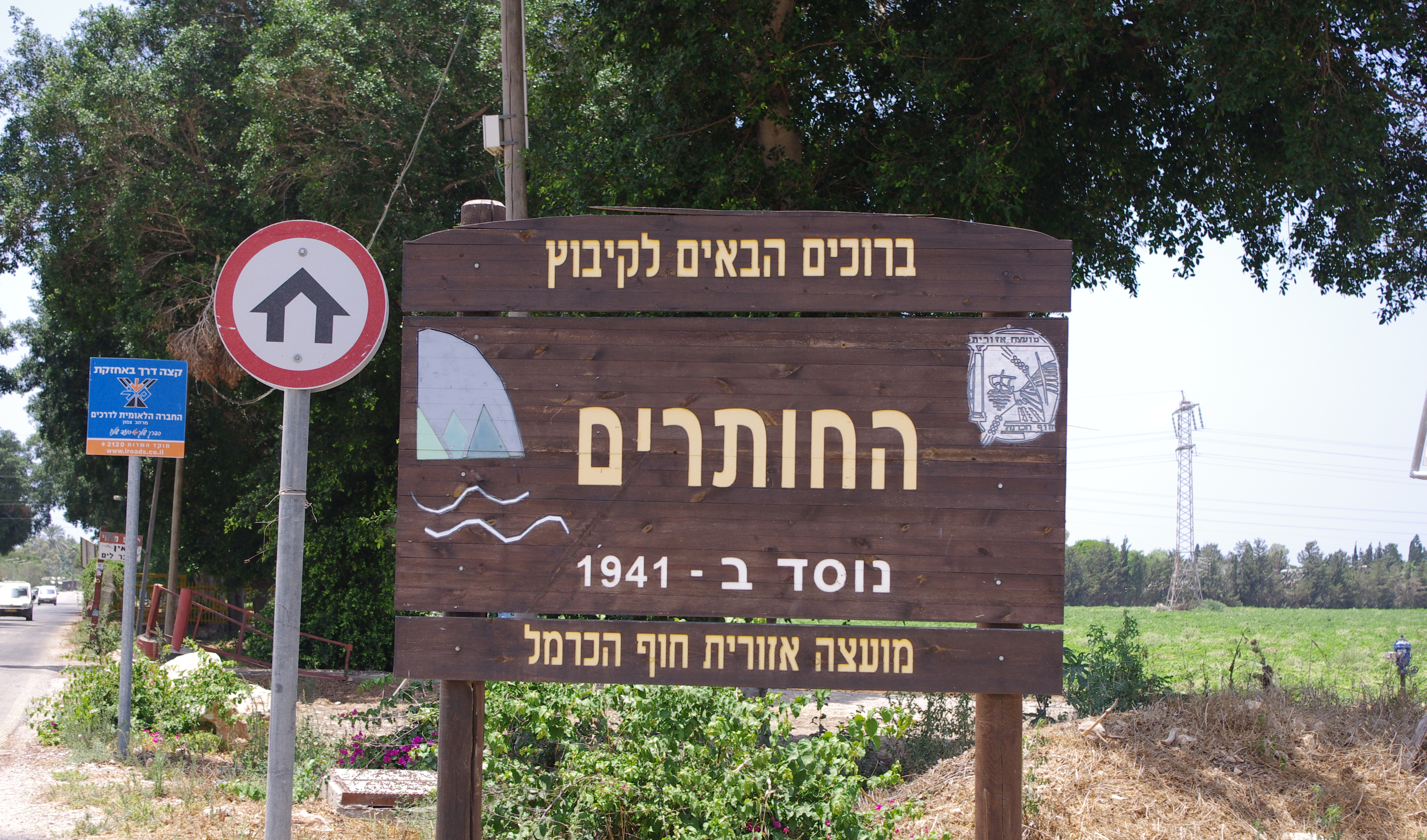
- HaHotrim entrance sign

- Location within Haifa region of Israel
- Coordinates: 32°45′5″N 34°57′22″E
- Country: Israel
- District: Haifa
- Subdistrict: Hadera
- Council: Hof HaCarmel
- Affiliation: Kibbutz Movement
- Founded: 1941/1952
- Founder: Czechoslovak and German Jewish Refugees
- Population (2024): 941
- Website: http://www.hahotrim.com/

HaHotrim (Hebrew: הַחוֹתְרִים, lit. 'The Rowers') is a kibbutz in northern Israel. Located near Tirat Carmel, it falls under the jurisdiction of Hof HaCarmel Regional Council. In 2024 it had a population of 941.

== History ==
The beginnings of the kibbutz were in December 1941, with the formation of a work company near Kiryat Haim by Jewish refugees from Czechoslovakia and Germany. The meaning of the name HaHotrim (The Rowers) is symbolising the wishes of the founders to engage in fishing. The kibbutz was established in 1952 on land near the depopulated Palestinian village of al-Tira.
