= Meir Shfeya =

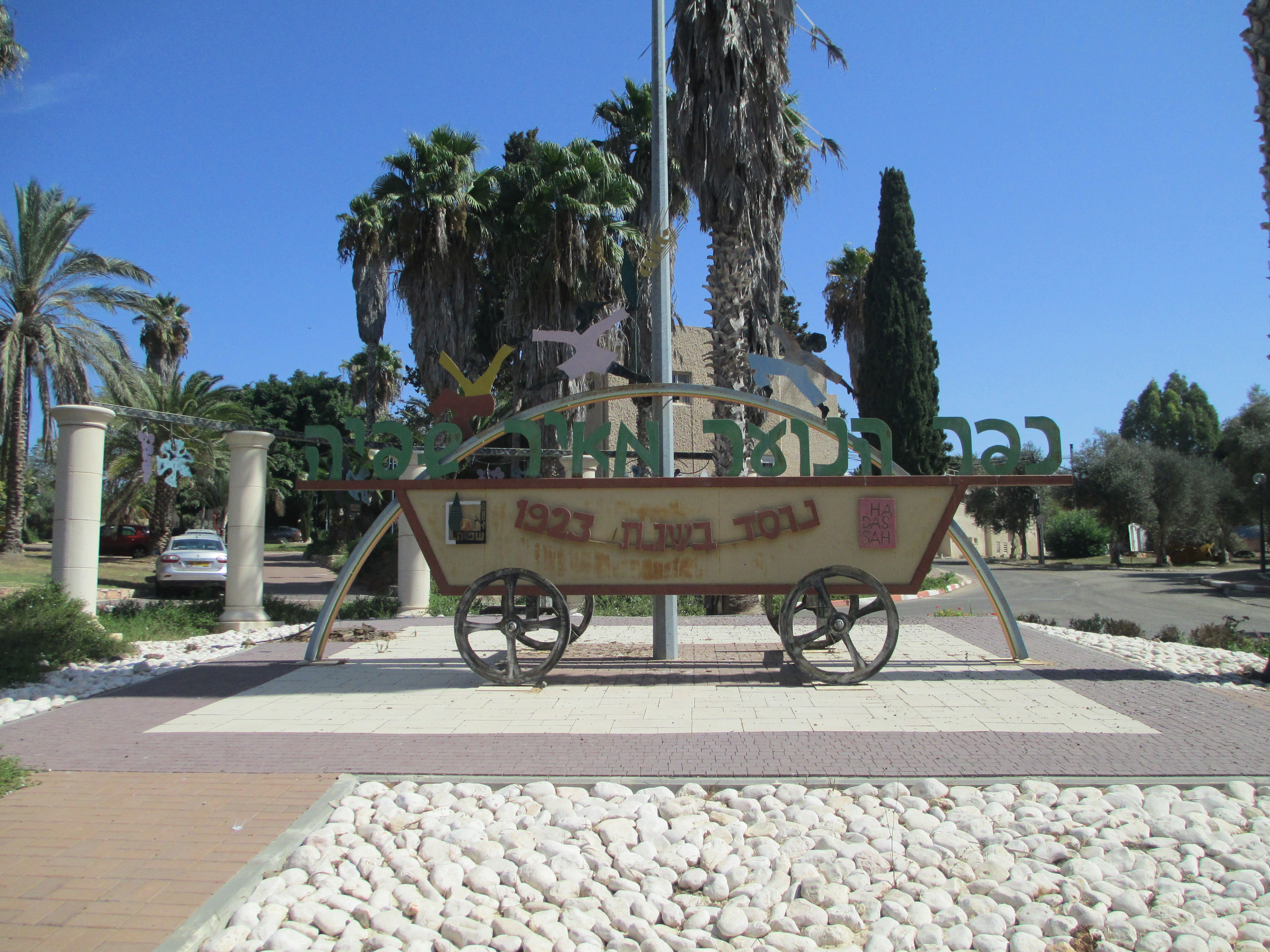
- Village entrance

- Location within Haifa region of Israel
- Coordinates: 32°35′25″N 34°58′14″E
- Grid position: 147/221 PAL
- Country: Israel
- District: Haifa
- Subdistrict: Hadera
- Council: Hof HaCarmel
- Founded: 1891
- Population (2024): 140
- Website: www.shfeyah.org.il

Meir Shfeya (Hebrew: מֵאִיר שְׁפֵיָה) is a youth village and agricultural boarding school in northern Israel. Located near Zikhron Ya'akov, it falls under the jurisdiction of Hof HaCarmel Regional Council. In 2024 it had a population of 140.

== History ==
The site of Meir Shfeya was once a Muslim village named Shefeia, meaning "the edge or margin". In 1859, the population was given as 100, who cultivated 11 feddans of land. In 1882, the PEF's Survey of Western Palestine (SWP) described as "a small village with a well to the north." A population list from about 1887 showed that Shefeia had about 130 inhabitants, all Muslims.

Modern Meir Shfeya was established in 1891 as a moshava adjacent to Zikhron Ya'akov. The name is a combination of Meir, named for Amschel Mayer (Meir) Rothschild, the grandfather of Baron Rothschild, and Shefeia. In 1904 Israel Belkind, a founder of Bilu, established an educational institute in the village under the name Kiryat Sefer, which took in orphans from the Kishinev pogrom. This made it the first youth village in the country.

In 1917 the Herzliya Hebrew High School was temporarily moved to the village due to the expulsion of Jews from Tel Aviv and Jaffa during World War I. World War I left many orphaned children in Jerusalem. A girls school called Aliza's care center, established in the yard of the Diskin Orphanage on Nevi'im Street with funding from the American Zionist women's organization, Hadassah, moved to Shfeya in 1923.

In the Mandatory era, the 1922 census of Palestine attributed a population of 81 to Meiriya (Shafiya), of which 38 were Muslims and 43 were Jews, increasing sharply in the 1931 census to 208; 40 Muslims and 168 Jews, in a total of 18 houses.

In 1929, the annual convention of Junior Hadassah voted to acquire a farm at Rabia, near Meier Shefaya, where graduates of the school would engage in agriculture. A budget of $7,500 was allotted for this project over a period of three years until the farm became self-supporting.

On 28 August 1929, the British police ordered the evacuation of the village to protect residents as the 1929 Palestine Riots engulfed the country.

By the 1945 statistics the village had a population of 330, all Jews.

The village was used as a training base by the Haganah due to its remote location in a mountainous area. In 1957 it was made a partnership between the State and the organisation, and today exists as a youth village.

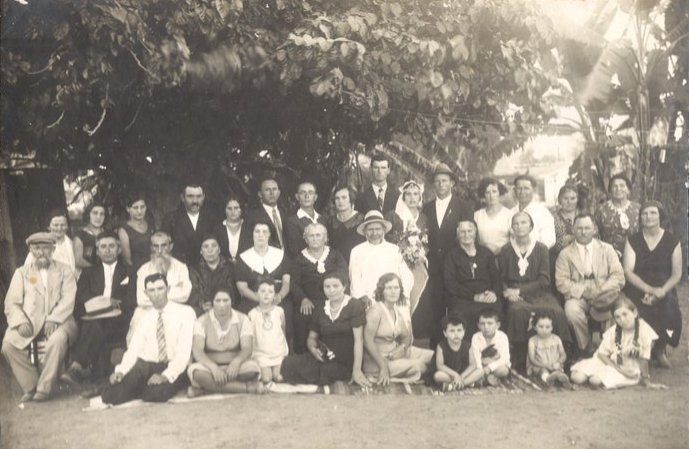
Meir Shfeya in 1925

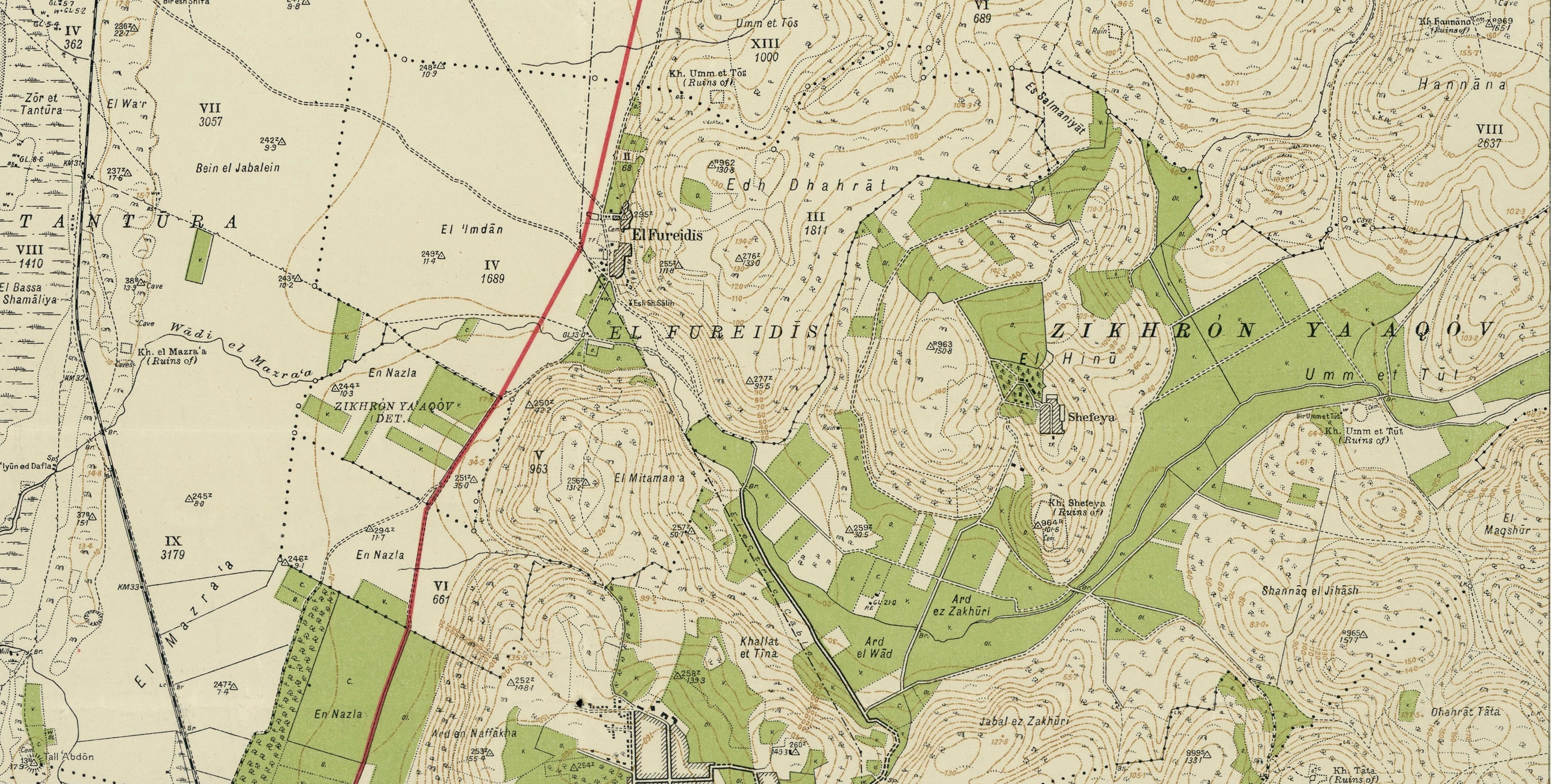
Meir Shfeya (Shefeya) 1938 1:20,000

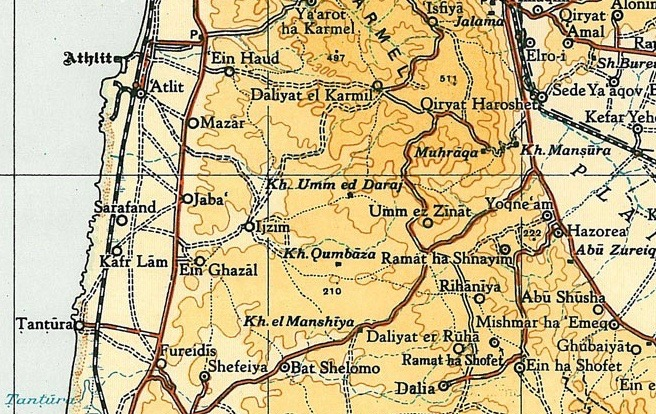
Meir Shfeya (Shefeiya) 1945 1:250,000

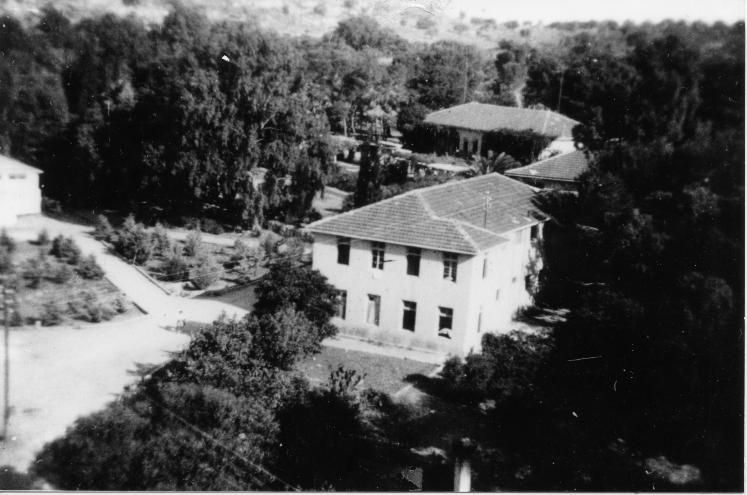
Meir Shfeya youth village. Palmach archive photograph. 1946

== Notable residents ==
- Sara Levi-Tanai, choreographer and songwriter
