= Ein Carmel =

Ein Carmel: עֵין כַּרְמֶל (Hebrew)
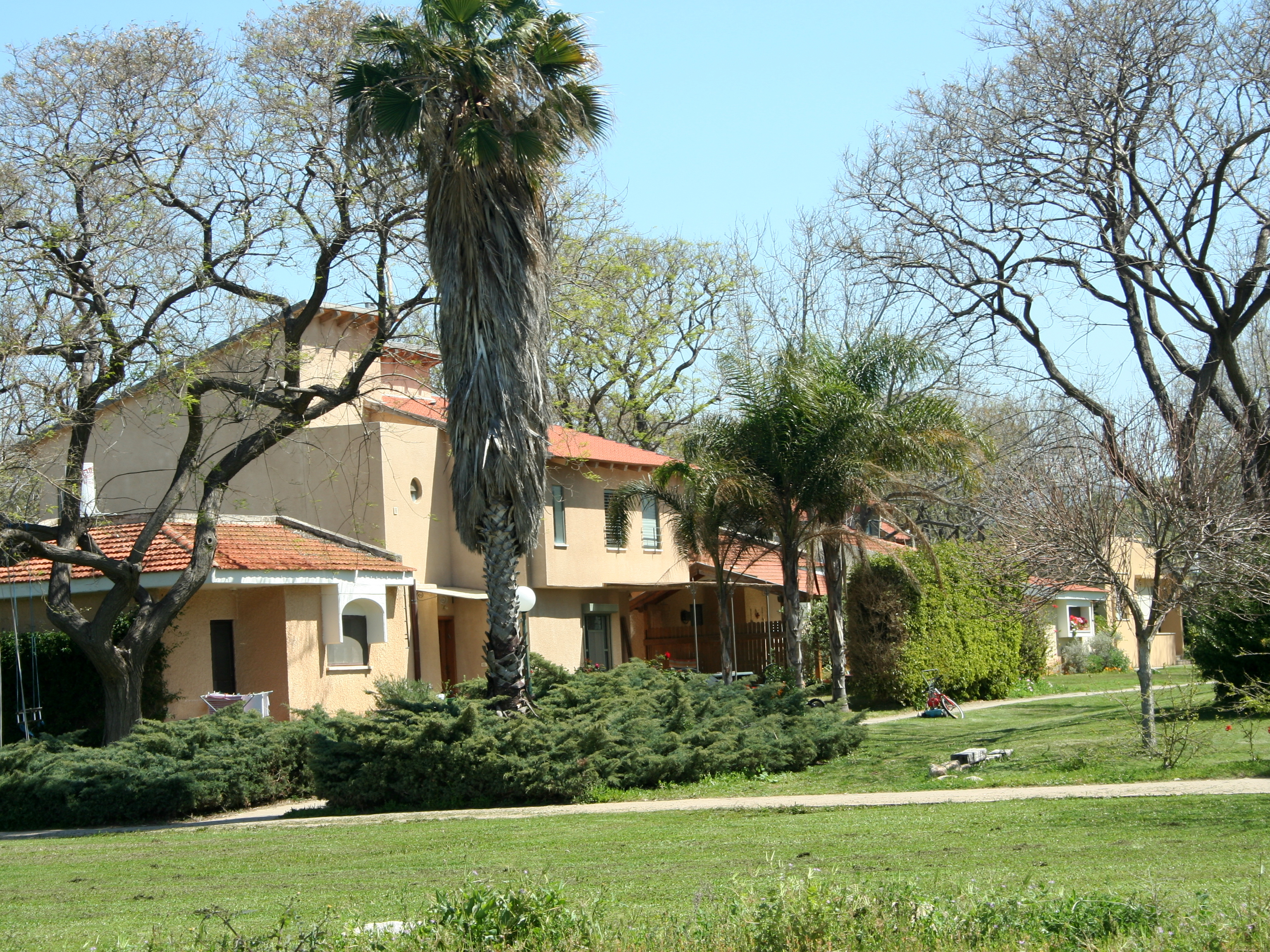

- Location within Haifa region of Israel
- Coordinates: 32°40′33″N 34°57′12″E
- Country: Israel
- District: Haifa
- Subdistrict: Hadera
- Council: Hof HaCarmel
- Affiliation: Kibbutz Movement
- Founded: 1950
- Founder: Former residents of Ein HaYam and Ramat Rachel
- Population (2024): 797
- Website: www.ein-carmel.org.il

Ein Carmel (Hebrew: עֵין כַּרְמֶל, lit. 'Carmel Spring') is a kibbutz in northern Israel. Located near Atlit, it falls under the jurisdiction of Hof HaCarmel Regional Council. In 2024 it had a population of 797.

== History ==
The kibbutz was established in 1950 by former residents of Ein HaYam and Ramat Rachel, a kibbutz that had been destroyed during the 1948 Arab–Israeli War. The founding charter of the kibbutz was signed at the end of the war by four adults and two children from each of the groups of settlers.

The village is located one kilometer from the former Palestinian village of al-Mazar, which was depopulated during the 1948 Arab-Israeli war. Most residents had fled in May 1948, two months before the village was destroyed during an operation in mid-July.

== Notable people ==
- Aaron Ben-Ze'ev (born 1949), philosopher and President of the University of Haifa
- Aviv Pinkas (born 1992), actress
