= Kfar Galim =

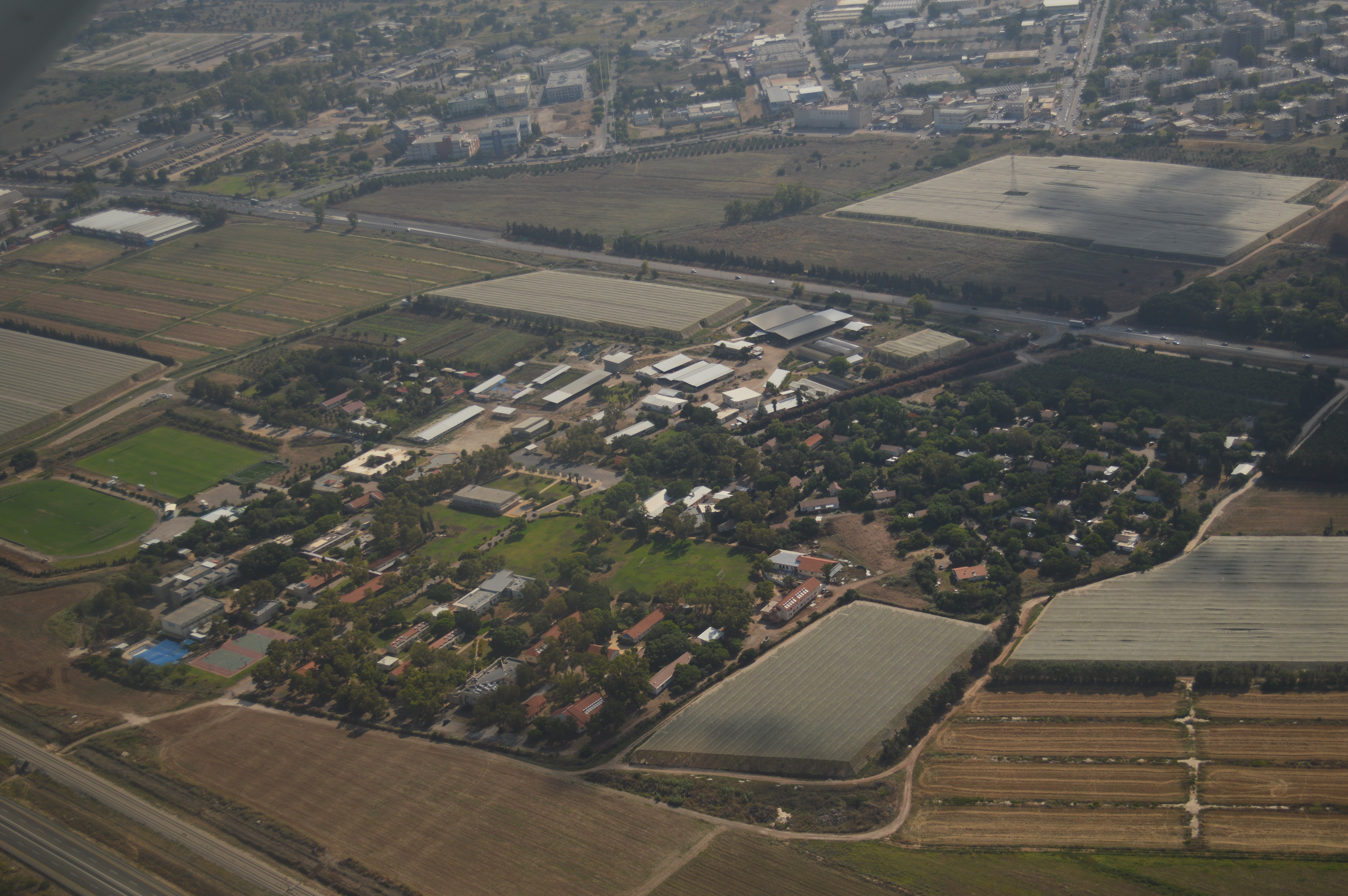

- Location within Haifa region of Israel
- Coordinates: 32°45′58″N 34°57′34″E
- Country: Israel
- District: Haifa
- Subdistrict: Hadera
- Council: Hof HaCarmel
- Founded: 1952
- Population (2024): 161

Kfar Galim (Hebrew: כְּפַר גַּלִּים, lit. 'Waves Village') is a boarding school and youth village in northern Israel. Located near Tirat Carmel, it falls under the jurisdiction of Hof HaCarmel Regional Council. In 2024 it had a population of 161.

== History ==
The school was established in 1952 as a partnership between the Haifa municipal council and the Ministry of Immigrant Absorption.

Kfar Galim runs a middle school, a high school, an engineering college and a farm. It also has dormitory facilities.

Kfar Galim accepts students in 7th to 12th grade. It offers majors in biology and environmental sciences, communication and society (radio and television) and physical education. It also runs an electronic and computer engineering technology program in collaboration with the Israel Air Force (13th and 14th grades). Graduates of this program are awarded a Practical Engineering degree and can do their military service in the air force. The boarding school has an enrollment of 170 students from all over the country. Many are new immigrants or children of Russian and Ethiopian immigrants. Admission is also open to Israeli teenagers.

== Notable alumni ==
- Ayoob Kara

== See also ==
- Education in Israel
