= Ma'agan Michael =

Ma'agan Michael: מַעֲגַן מִיכָאֵל (Hebrew)
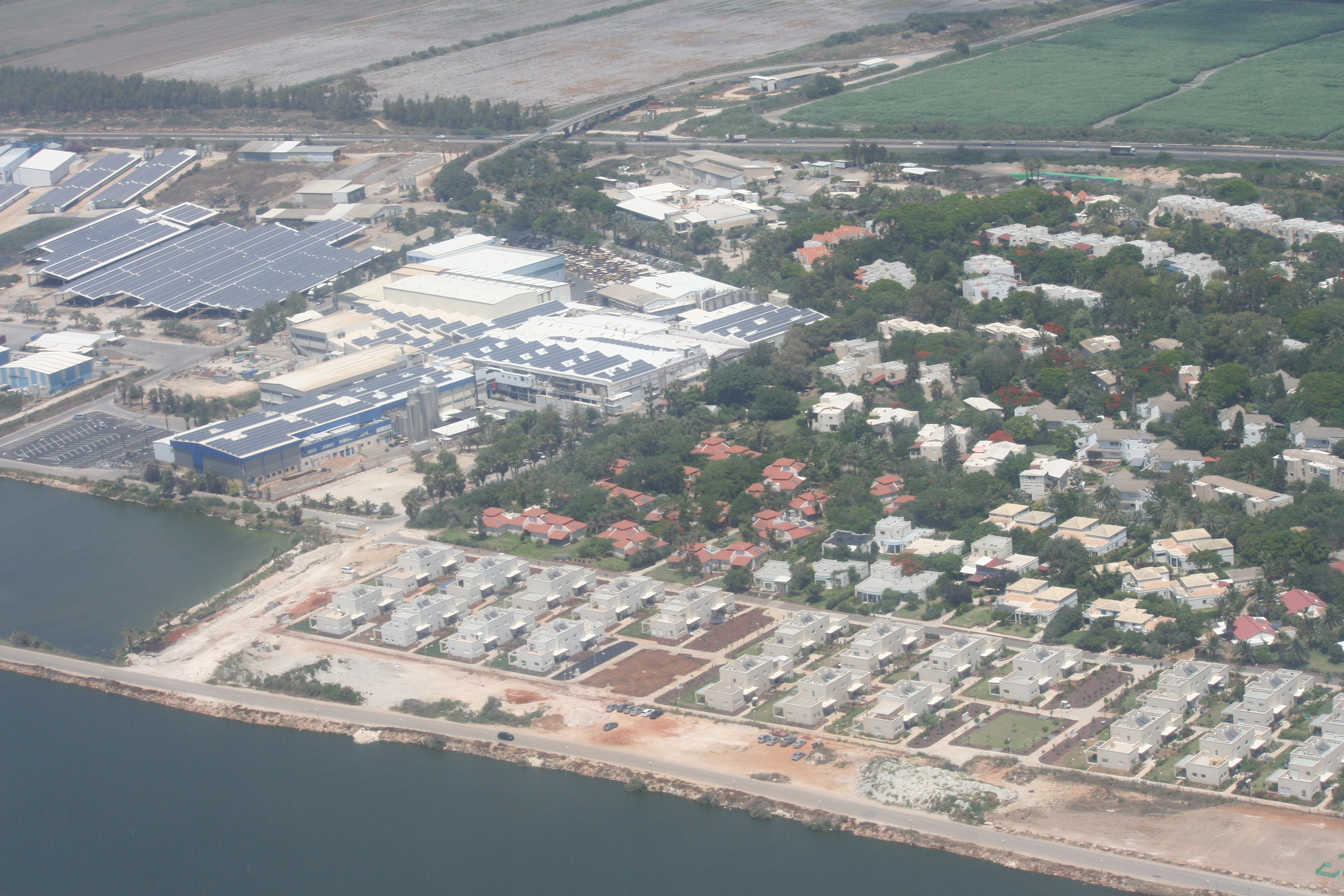
- Etymology: Michael's Anchorage
- Location within Haifa region of Israel Location within Israel
- Coordinates: 32°33′25″N 34°55′1″E
- Country: Israel
- District: Haifa
- Subdistrict: Hadera
- Council: Hof HaCarmel
- Affiliation: Kibbutz Movement
- Founded: 25 August 1949
- Founder: Hebrew Scouts
- Population (2024): 2,093
- Website: www.maaganm.co.il

Ma'agan Michael (Hebrew: מַעֲגַן מִיכָאֵל, lit. Michael's Anchorage) is a kibbutz in northern Israel. Located on the Mediterranean Sea coast between Haifa and Hadera, it falls under the jurisdiction of Hof HaCarmel Regional Council. In 2024 it had a population of 2,093.

Ma'agan Michael is among Israel's largest and most financially independent kibbutzim. It was founded on 25 August 1949 by a group from the Hebrew Scouts.

== Name ==
Ma'agan means anchorage. The founding group was planning to settle on the seashore, motivated by the dream of establishing a Jewish fishing industry. The founding group owned a fishing boat even before settling on the coast and were determined to build a fishing anchorage.

The second part of the name comes from Michael Pollack, founder of the Nesher cement plant.

== History ==
=== Background ===
==== Kabara concession ====
The area was previously known as Kabara, or Zor al-Zarqa (the latter referring to the Zarqa River). The land was either mostly rocky and hilly, or marshland, and was regarded by the Mandate government, which had maintained the Ottoman Land Code of 1858, as mawat (uninhabited/uncultivated). A government concession was leased to the Palestine Jewish Colonization Association (PJCA or PICA) in 1921.

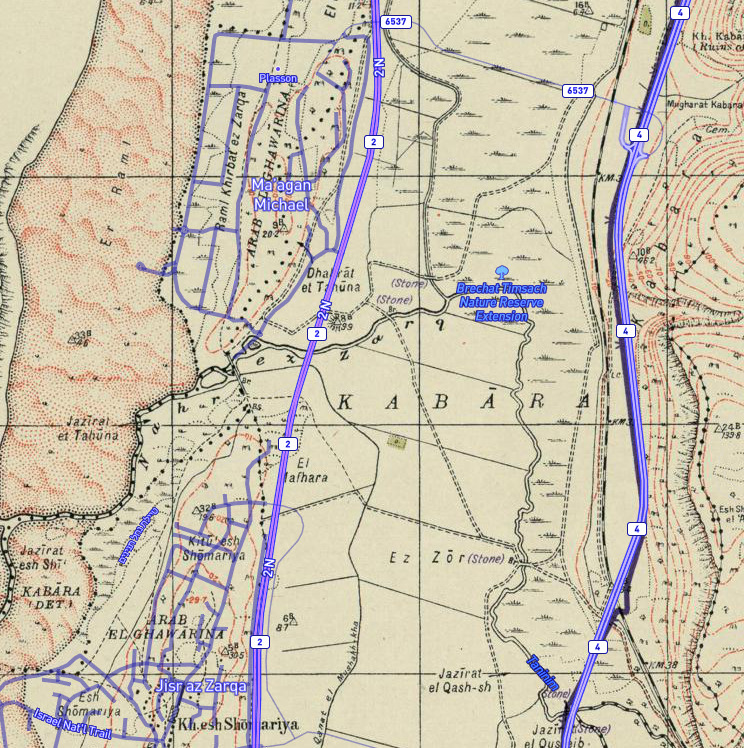
1940s map from the Survey of Palestine, with the modern layouts of Ma'agan Michael and Jisr az-Zarqa overlaid. The label "Arab el-Ghawarina" refers to the largest of the two bedouin groups which lived on the land.

The two groups which sedentarized the area, 'Arab al-Ghawarneh' and 'Arab Kabbara', comprised 79 families and 13 families respectively in the 1920s; the Mandate government concluded that although state lands which were occupied by Arabs could not be allocated for Jewish settlement, this area would be made an exception.

Throughout the Mandate the British authorities and PICA attempted to enter into settlements with the local population, and subsequently to remove them from the land. The PICA undertook land amelioration projects by draining the Kabbara marshes in the 1920s and foresting some parts of Barrat Qisarya, but the Arab population remained in place until the end of the Mandate period.

The Kabarra swampland was drained in the 1920s with money from Baron Rothschild, and labor of Jewish pioneers and local Bedouin residents.

==== 1948 war and aftermath ====
The area was depopulated of its Arab residents during the 1948 Palestine war, with the exception of the 'Arab al-Ghawarneh tribe, and in 1949-51 three new Jewish villages were established in the area, with Ma'agan Michael being the first one.

=== Settlement group before 1949 ===
The group which would eventually establish the settlement at its permanent location in 1949, first joined together in 1942, most of its members coming from the Hebrew Scouts.

The group was originally based in a temporary Jewish Agency camp in Pardes Hanna, where they learned the skills needed to create an independent settlement, including how to manage citrus groves, cows, sheep, and chickens.

The initial group was joined by a larger group of younger immigrants without their parents from Germany and Austria (Youth Aliyah), and were undergoing preparatory training at Ein Gev. The group stayed in Pardess Hanna until the end of World War II, while several members were sent abroad as emissaries; others joined the Jewish Brigade, the Palmach, worked in other kibbutzim, in the Dead Sea Works at Sdom, or in the newly established Military Industries.

In 1946 the HQ Staff of the Haganah relocated the group to a temporary settlement in Rehovot, at a site which later was known as "Kibbutz Hill". This settlement was to serve as cover for a secret underground factory manufacturing 9mm ammunition for Sten submachine guns. During this period the kibbutz members lived a double life to keep information of the illicit arms factory from the British Mandate Forces. In 1948 the factory was moved to the newly-founded Military Industries (TAAS). The site at Kibbutz Hill in Rehovot is currently preserved as the Ayalon Museum.

=== Foundation at current site (1949) ===
Ma'agan Michael was officially founded on 25 August 1949, when the first members began settling the present site by erecting there wooden huts prepared by carpenters in Rehovot. The kibbutz started with a total of 154 members and 44 children.

=== Early years ===
In the early years the kibbutz took in many disadvantaged youngsters and youth groups (youth aliyah). An ulpan was opened, and many ulpan graduates later joined the ranks of the kibbutz membership. The ulpan became popular and successful, and has completed more than 100 5-month-long courses with thousands of graduates.

Most of the agricultural land of the kibbutz was reclaimed from the Kabarra swampland, most of which had been drained in the 1920s (see above).

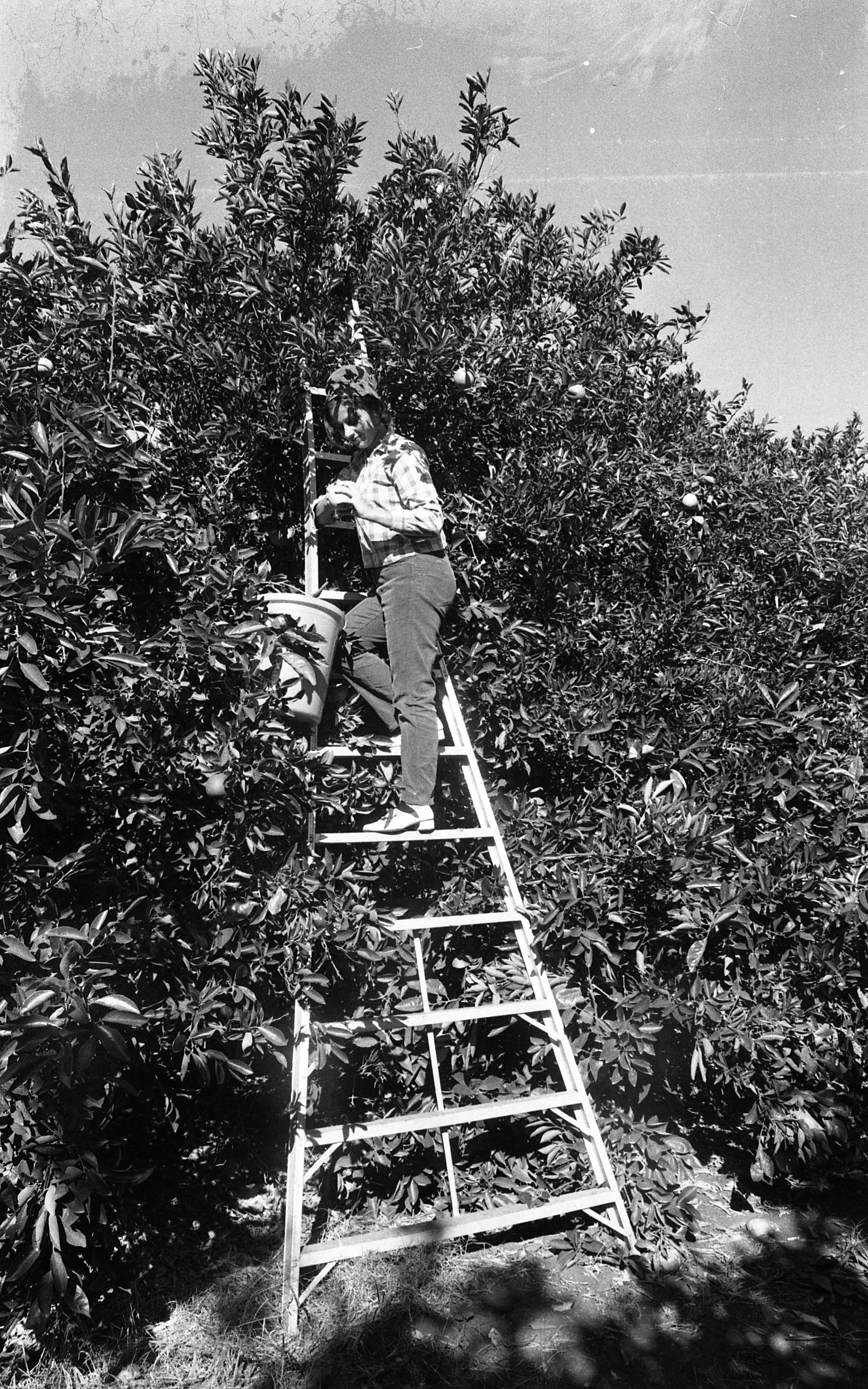
Kibbutz volunteer working in the groves of Ma'agan Michael, 1969

=== 1978 massacre ===
On 11 March 1978, eleven Palestinian militants landed in Zodiac boats on a beach just outside Ma'agan Michael and from there ventured towards Tel Aviv in a hijacked bus in what has become known as the Coastal Road massacre where 38 Israelis were killed. First, however, the terrorists shot and killed American nature photographer Gail Rubin, who was photographing wildlife on the beach at the kibbutz for a book.

=== Recent evolution ===
The kibbutz has become the largest kibbutz in Israel with a population of 1,412, consisting of 791 members and candidates for membership, 383 children, plus non-member residents, soldiers, and ulpanists.

The kibbutz engaged in internal talks regarding the desire for change based on providing the members with a greater choice in their decisions and their budgets, greater privatization, and less dependence on others. They adopted a decision regarding the dining room and increasing options by paying for food. All these changes are being approached slowly and deliberately to try to preserve the kibbutz's communal values.

== Geography ==
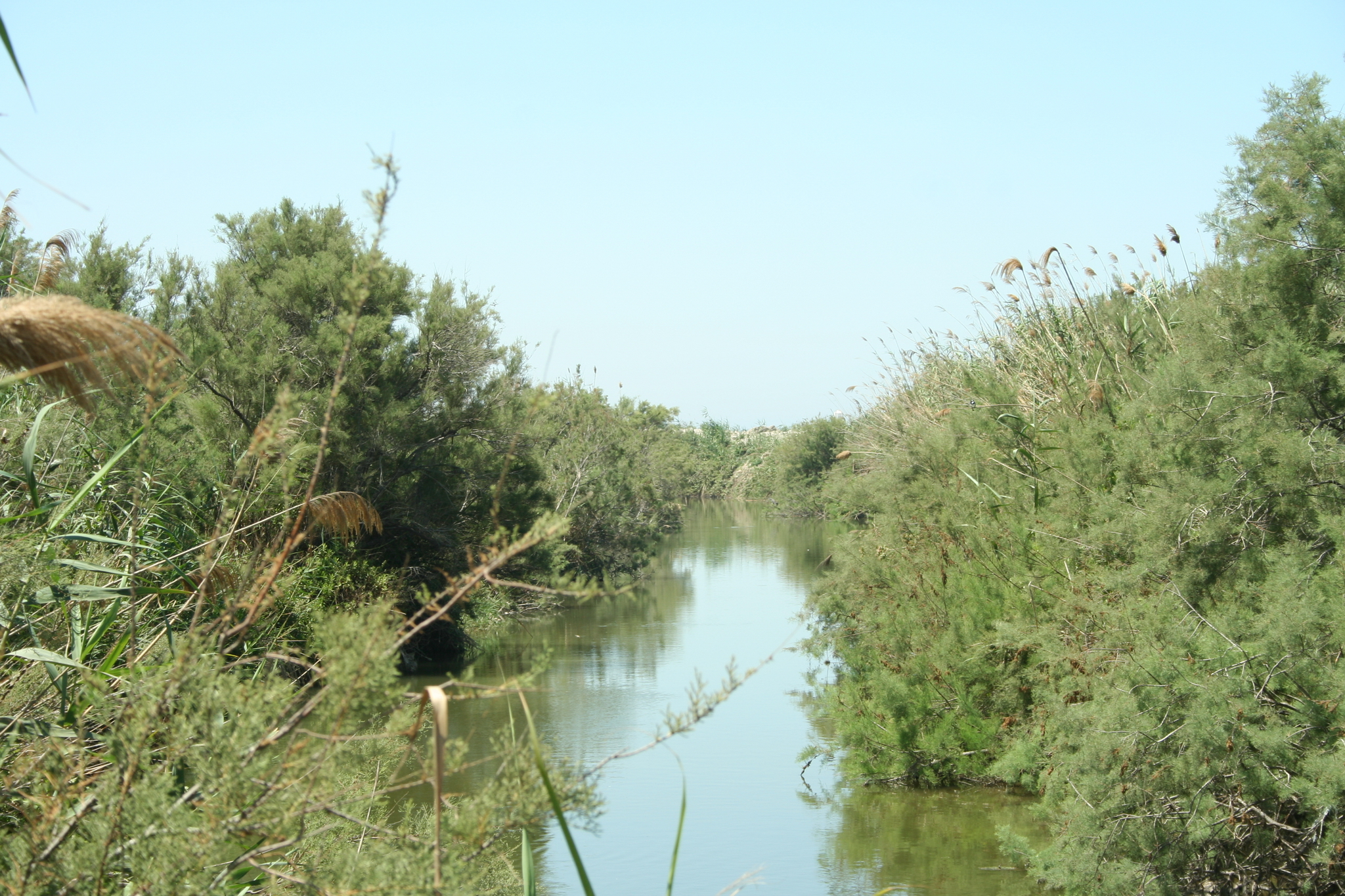
Nahal Taninim

The kibbutz is located 30 km south of Haifa and 70 km north of Tel Aviv and lies near the edge of the Mediterranean Sea west of Mount Carmel, south of bordering kibbutz Ma'ayan Zvi, and north of the Taninim Stream. It is north of an Arab village, Jisr az-Zarqa.

The original site was a windswept, treeless sandstone (Eolianite) hill. Some of this land was reclaimed from Kabarra swamp. The nearby Timsah Springs, which originates from the Taninim Stream, is one of the local sources of brackish water for the kibbutz' numerous fishponds, which total 1,600 dunams (1.6 km^{2}) in surface area. The Nahal Taninim nature reserve lies south of the kibbutz and is the site of an ancient Roman dam and aqueduct, which have been restored by the Department of Antiquities, the Drainage Authorities, and Nature and Parks Authorities.

== Demographics ==
Together with the Israel-born members, the kibbutz membership has a heterogeneity of origins. It has absorbed members with origins from all over the world. Many members came from Arab countries (Iraq, Tunisia, Morocco).

== Economy ==
=== Nature reserve ===
A small area the Kabarra marshes, otherwise drained in the 1920s, remains swamplike and is used as pasture for horses and as a nature reserve.

=== Agriculture ===
Ma'agan Michael's agricultural endeavors includes field crops and orchards. Field crops are grown on 1600 dunams (1.6 km^{2}) of the Kabarra. Fodder is grown for the dairy cows. For many years the main crop has been cotton. Several varieties of avocado (1,000 dunams) are grown, especially in orchards in Tantura, most of which is exported to Europe. The kibbutz produces 1,200 tons of bananas per year, solely for the local market. Papaya and other exotic fruits are grown in 40 dunams in greenhouses (organic crop), with over 80 types of fruit trees (Abraham's Orchard) on Mount Carmel.

The kibbutz produces 2,000 tons of poultry per year, using free-range intensive breeding. The chick hatchery produces about 4.5 million day-old chicks per year. There is a dairy herd with about 300 cows and 200 calves, which produces over 3.2 million liters of milk per year.

MADAN is the Aquaculture Fish farming branch of kibbutz Ma’agan Michael agriculture enterprises. The aquaculture branches include about 1600 dunams of fishponds, where edible fish such as carp, gray mullet, St. Peter's fish and silver carp are raised. There is also an area for intensive fish production in concrete ponds, which are used to raise almost 300 tons of striped bass, Musar, Lavrak. The kibbutz sells over 1,000 tons of edible fish per year. The kibbutz also raises seafish, as well as decorative fish for ponds and aquaria, such as Koi and goldfish.

=== Industry ===
Plasson is the kibbutz's plastics factory. It was founded in 1963 and is the main source of income and employment for the kibbutz. Annual sales reach about $100 million, with some 85% of the products exported worldwide. The main Plasson factory at Ma'agan Michael employs over 400 workers, half of them members of the kibbutz. About 200 more workers are employed in subsidiaries around the world. Plasson is a leader in polyethylene pipe-fittings, poultry drinker systems, and is a large producer of toilet-flushing systems, mainly for the local market. The company has full ownership of six marketing companies abroad and holds part ownership in several others. Plasson also holds full or part ownership of 6 production companies in Israel and abroad. In 1997, 20% of Plasson was floated as stocks on the Tel Aviv stockmarket. The public company is called Plasson Industries, Inc. In April 2000 a strategic partner, the Swiss company George Fischer, acquired 20%.

Suron is a factory established by the kibbutz to produce precise metal parts using photochemical etching and electroforming, and also metal plating in gold and nickel. The precision metal parts produced by Suron are used in an industrial products and are used in industries involved in electronics, microelectronics, electro-optics, precise mechanics, electronic circuits and medical products. Suron also provides technical photographic service for high-tech industries.

== Pre-military and Hebrew courses ==
Muki Betser, a legendary commando officer, has founded a pre-military program (mechina) in the kibbutz, Mechinat Minsharim Kalu.

Since 1958 Ma'agan Michael has run two ulpans (intensive Hebrew courses) per year. The ulpan is a central part of the identity of Ma'agan Michael. Over 25% of the members of the kibbutz are graduates.

== Notable people ==
- Yohai Ben-Nun (1924–1994), sixth commander of the Israeli Navy
- Eliezer Rafaeli (1926–2018), founding President of the University of Haifa
- Janet Reger (1935–2005), British lingerie designer
- Meir Zorea (1923–1995), member of the ninth Knesset

== See also ==
- Ma'agan Michael Ship
- Walk on Water (film)
