= Kfar Tzvi Sitrin =

Kfar Tzvi Sitrin: כפר צבי סיטרין (Hebrew)
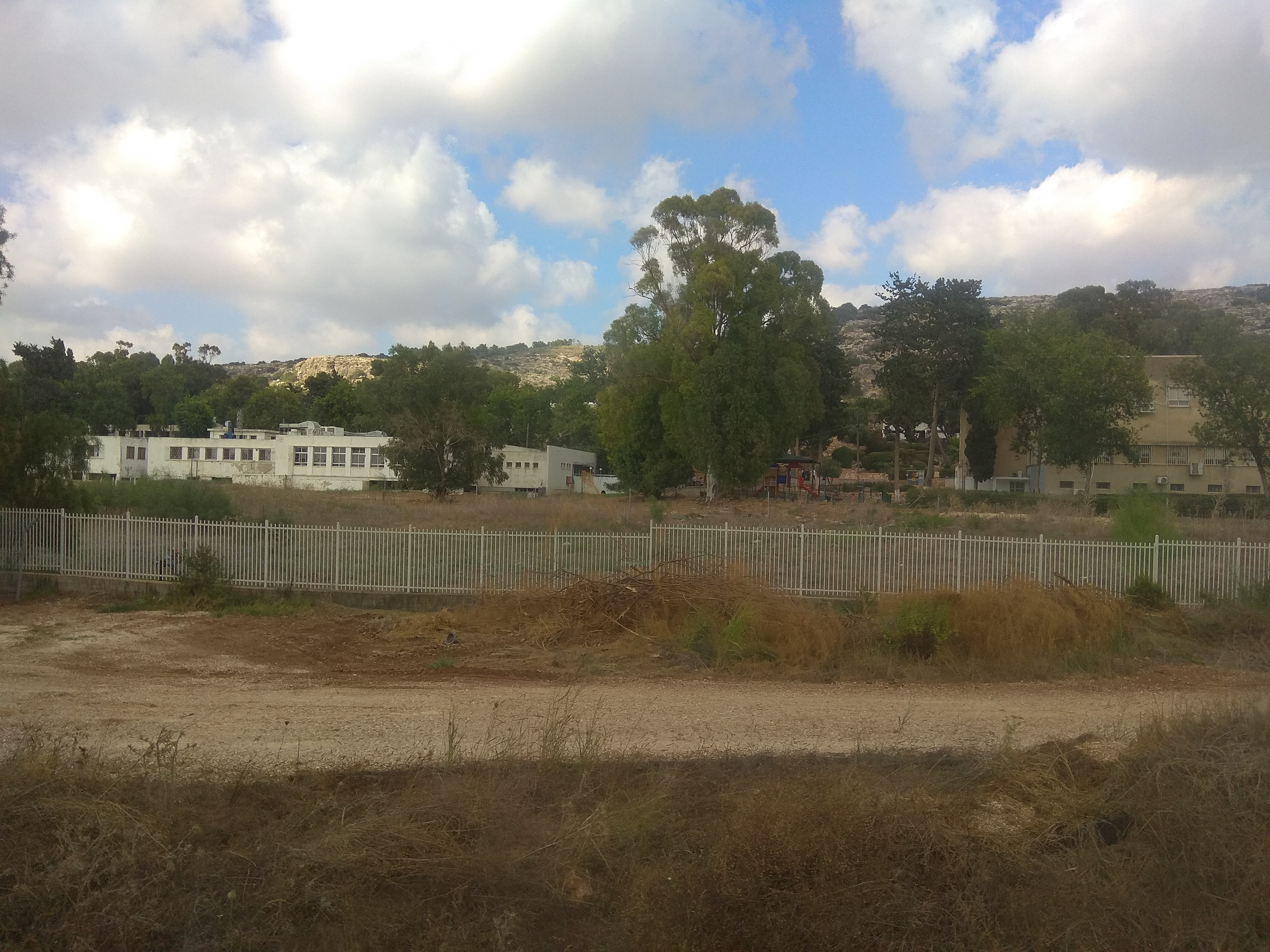

- Location within Haifa region of Israel
- Coordinates: 32°43′9″N 34°58′9″E
- Country: Israel
- District: Haifa
- Subdistrict: Hadera
- Council: Hof HaCarmel
- Founded: 1953
- Population (2024): 122

Kfar Tzvi Sitrin (Hebrew: כפר צבי סיטרין, lit. 'Zvi Sitrin Village'), also known as Beit Tzvi (Hebrew: בֵּית צְבִי, lit. Zvi House) is a technical college and village in northern Israel. Located near Highway 4, it falls under the jurisdiction of Hof HaCarmel Regional Council. In 2024 it had a population of 122.

== History ==
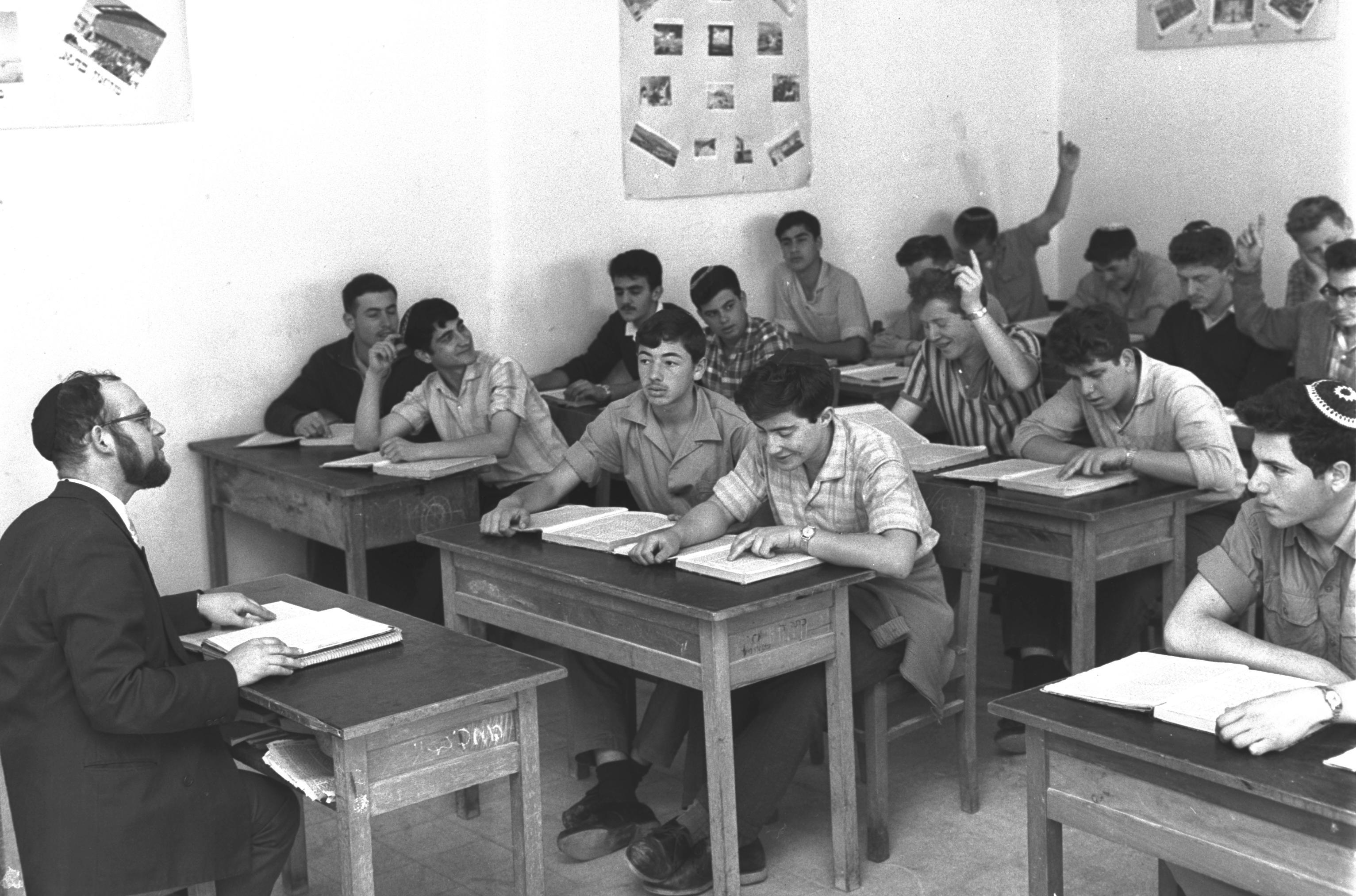
Kfar Sitrin Yeshiva and Technical High School, 1964

The village was established in 1953 as a professional religious school, and was named after Zvi Sitrin, a leader of Hapoel HaMizrachi in the United States. In the following years, the area was bought by Lev Leviev, and was used as a school and yeshiva named "Or Avner" after Leviev's father.
