= Megadim =

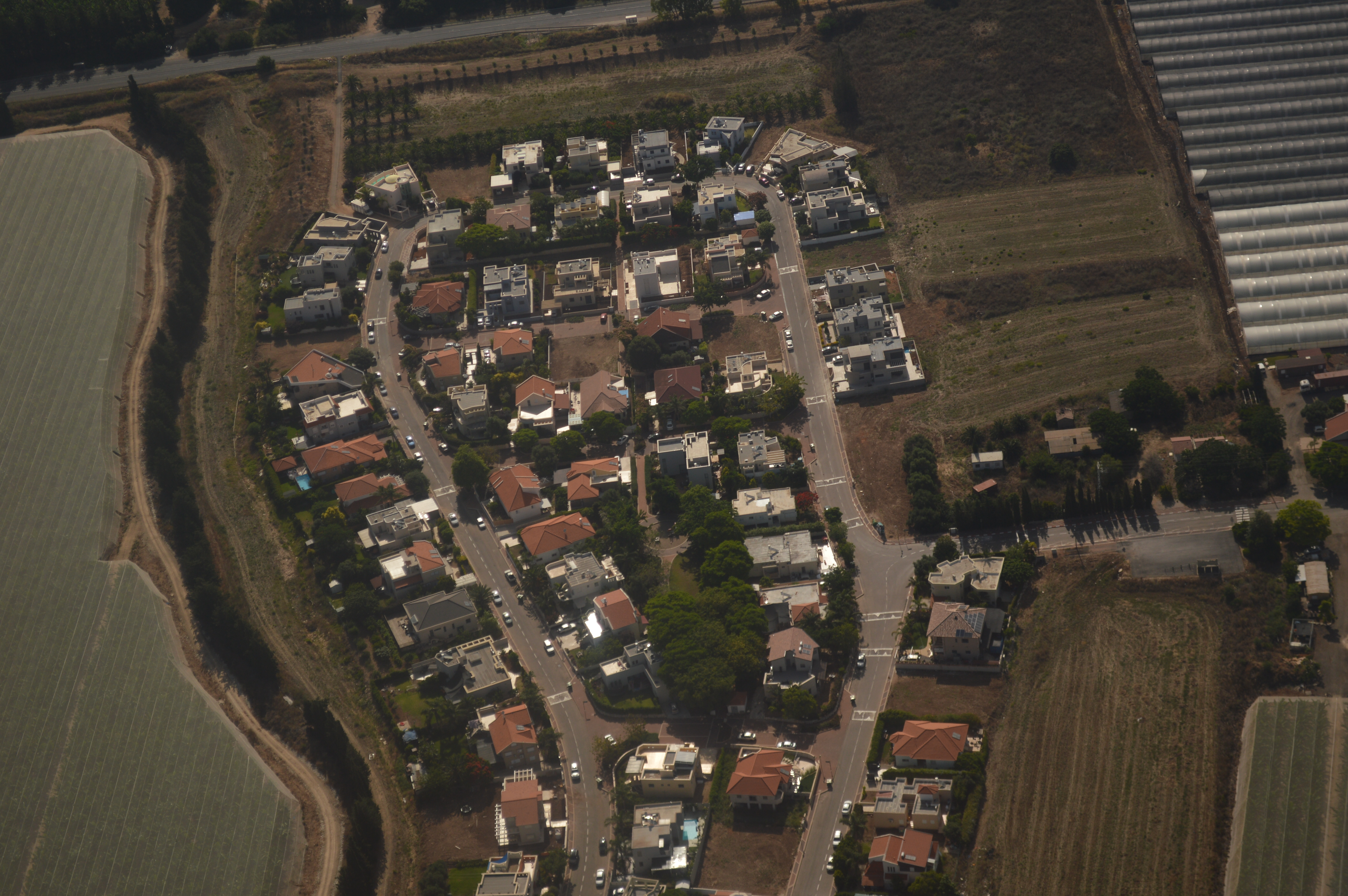

- Location within Haifa region of Israel
- Coordinates: 32°43′45″N 34°57′33″E
- Country: Israel
- District: Haifa
- Subdistrict: Hadera
- Council: Hof HaCarmel
- Affiliation: Moshavim Movement
- Founded: 1949
- Founder: Egyptian and Maghrebi Jewish immigrants and refugees
- Population (2024): 1,215

Megadim (Hebrew: מְגָדִים, lit. Precious) is a moshav in northern Israel. Located on the Mediterranean coast near Atlit and Highway 4, about 12 kilometres south of Haifa, it falls under the jurisdiction of Hof HaCarmel Regional Council. In 2024 it had a population of 1,215.

== History ==
It was founded in 1949 by Jewish immigrants and refugees from Maghreb and Egypt. Its name is a Biblical word, mentioned in Deuteronomy 33:13 : " May the Lord bless this land with the precious dew from heaven above." and in the Song of Songs 4:13;

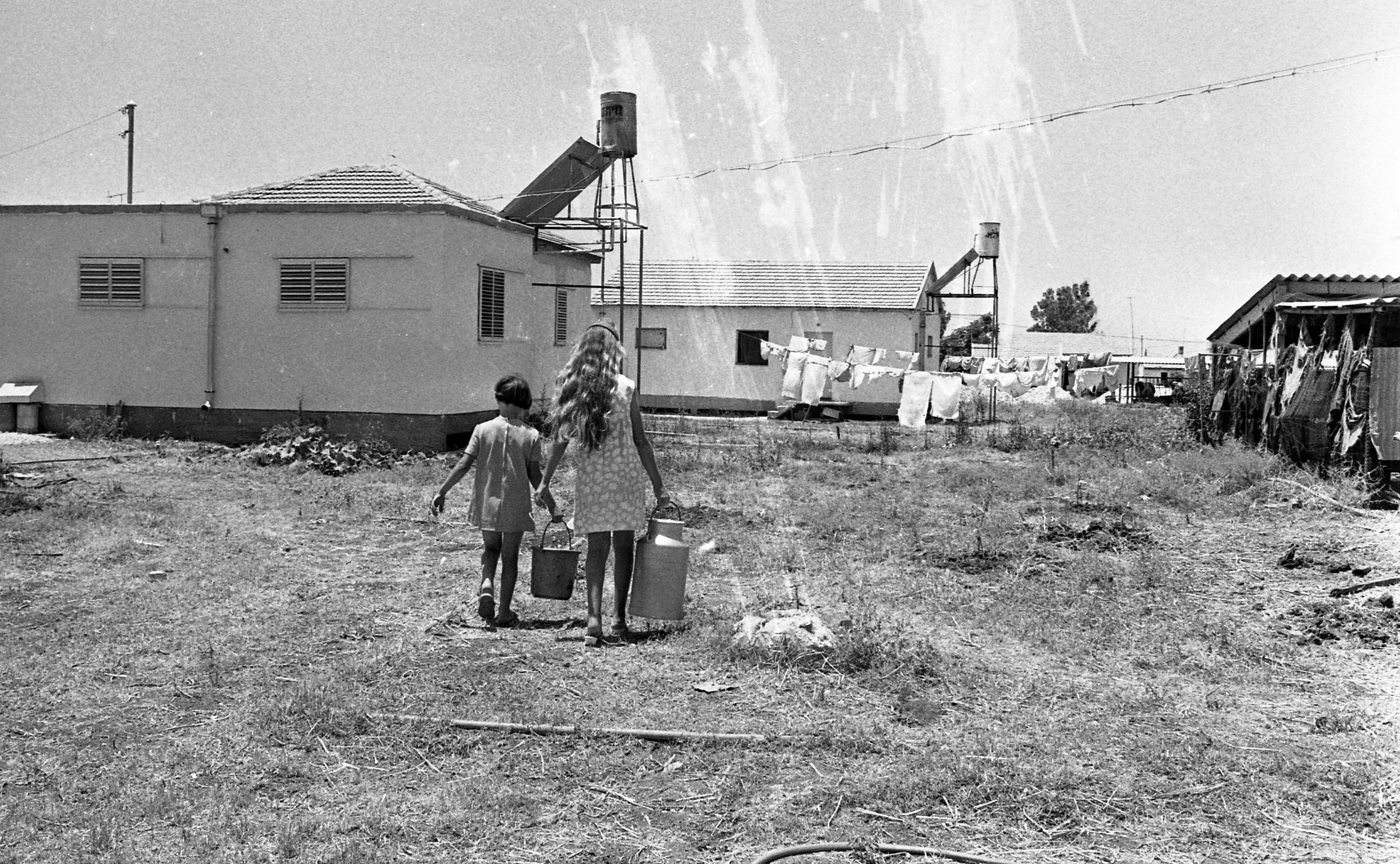
Megadim, 1969

Thy shoots are a park of pomegranates, with precious fruits; henna with spikenard plants.

== Notable people ==
- Elida Gera (1931-2017), film director, dancer, and choreographer
- Rabbi Shlomo Amar (born 1948), served as Megadim rabbi in 1973
