= Ein Hawd =

Arab village in northern Israel

Ein Hawd: עין חוד (Hebrew); عين حوض (Arabic)
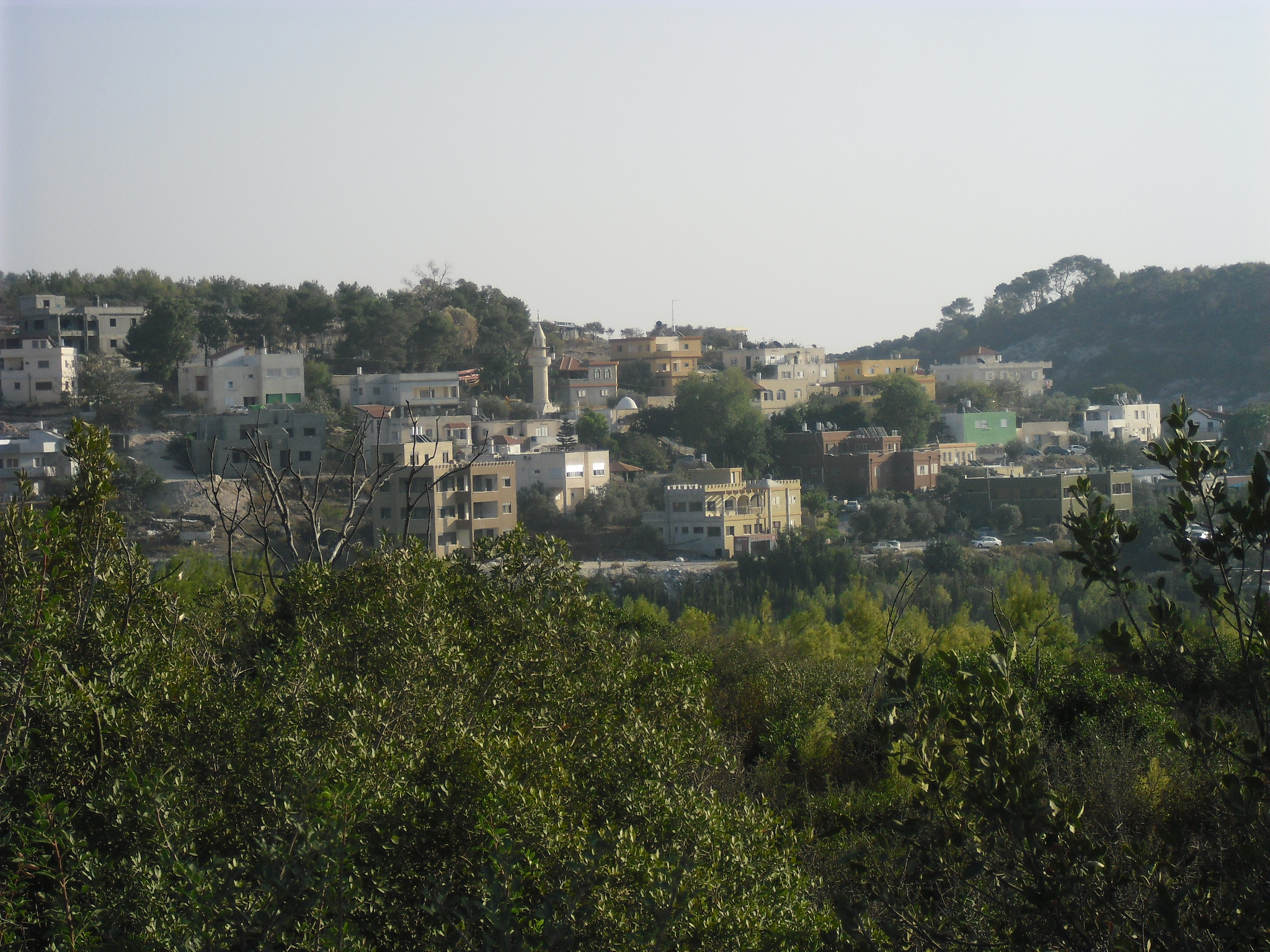

- Location within Haifa region of Israel Location within Israel
- Coordinates: 32°41′32″N 35°0′1″E
- Country: Israel
- District: Haifa
- Subdistrict: Hadera
- Council: Hof HaCarmel
- Population (2024): 345

Ein Hawd (Arabic: عين حوض; Hebrew: עין חוד) is an Arab village in northern Israel. Located on the foot of Mount Carmel, near Haifa, it falls under the jurisdiction of Hof HaCarmel Regional Council. In 2024 it had a population of 345.

== History ==
=== 20th century ===
The village was established following the 1948 Arab–Israeli War when 35 members of the Abu al-Hija family from the depopulated village of Ayn Hawd (now Ein Hod) returned to the village lands after being released from an Israeli prisoner of war camp, refused to leave the area and settled on the village lands. They established a new village. Initially the Israeli approved name given to the village by locals was Kfar Abu al-Hija. In 1978 the villagers were able to reclaim the name Ein Hawd. Attempts to dislodge them did not succeed, and they were eventually granted Israeli citizenship. In 1978 the village began removing the fence that Israeli authorities had surrounded the village with in 1964, to build 24 new houses. The Markovitch Commission report banded all buildings in Ein Houd as "grey" which froze all repairs to the village housing stock.

In 1988 it joined the Association of Unrecognized Arab Villages in Israel and was recognized by the state in 1992. Since Ein Hawd was recognized by the Israeli government, the village has joined the Hof HaCarmel Regional Council and urban planning is under way. In an interview, the village's mayor, Mohammed Abu al-Hija, was hopeful that these changes would be for the better: "It is true that many years have gone by, but this is a great achievement for everyone, a big step forward. The State of Israel has finally applied a policy of equality to us and I am hopeful that this will prove to be the case for other villages that are in similar situations as well...It helps to convince me that equality is attainable, no matter how difficult it may seem."

=== 21st century ===
In 2004, the Foundation for Achieving Seamless Territory (FAST) organized an international architecture and design competition for the development of an alternative master plan for Ein Hawd. More than 100 plans from more than 30 countries were received. The winners of the competition, a group of architects and designers from France, Germany and Israel have developed what they believe is a sustainable solution for the village. The project is divided into two parts, "One Land," a continuation of One Land Two Systems project, and an art show, "Platform Paradise." The One Land program consists of an alternative master plan; a landscape plan; the Golden Heart Pavilion as the first community building in Ein Hawd; a market combining agriculture, tourism, aesthetics and local hospitality; a restaurant called Habait, or el-Beit (The Home); a school and community center; an exhibit of the history of the village; a hotel and an outdoor cinema.

In 2005, Ein Hawd achieved full recognition, including connection to the Israeli electric grid.

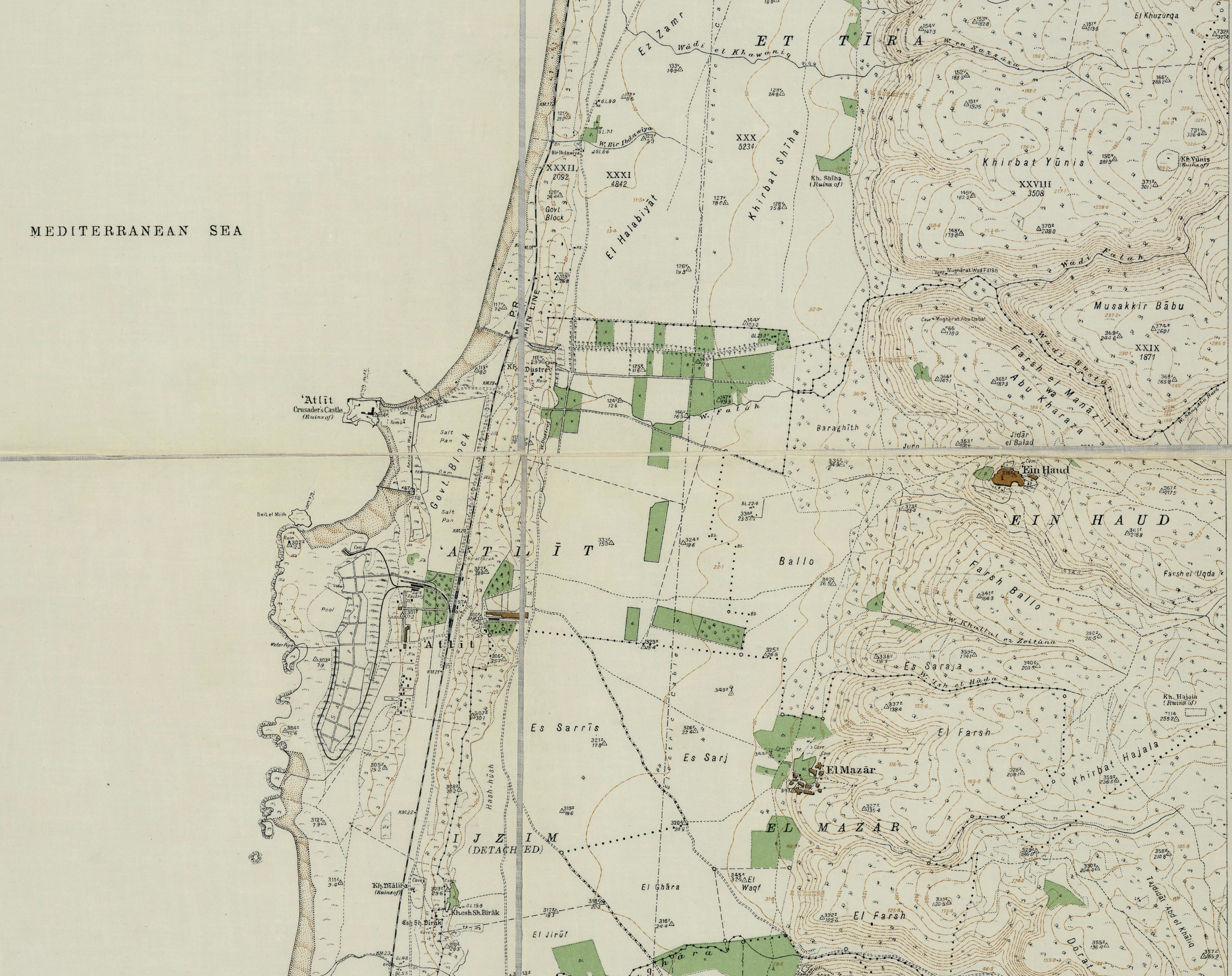
Ein Hawd (Ein Haud) 1932 1:20,000

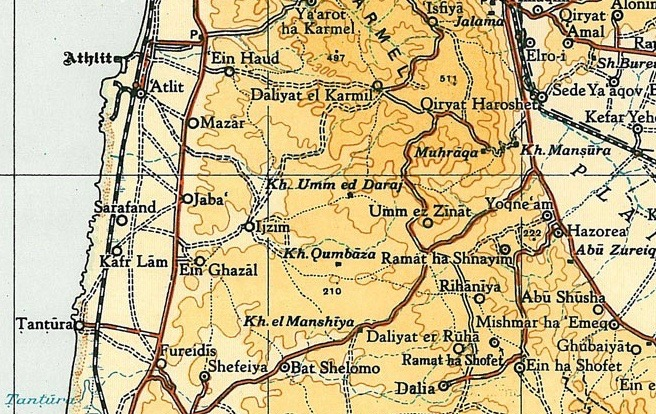
Ein Hard (Ein Haud) 1945 1:250,000

== See also ==
- Arab localities in Israel
- Population displacements in Israel after 1948
