= Ijzim =

Arab village in Mandatory Palestine

Ijzim إجزم Ikzim
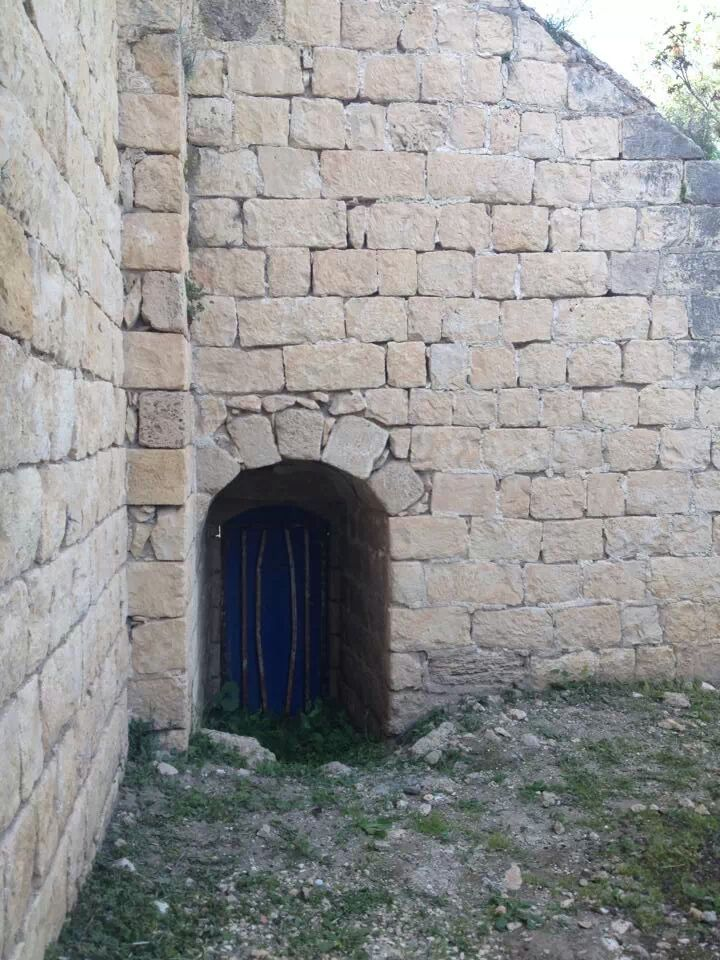
- Ijzim mosque

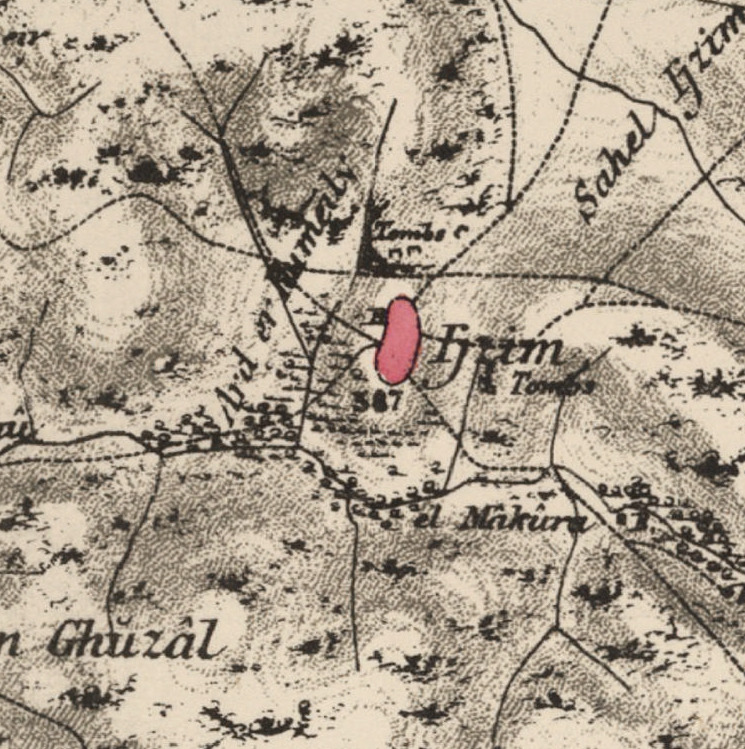
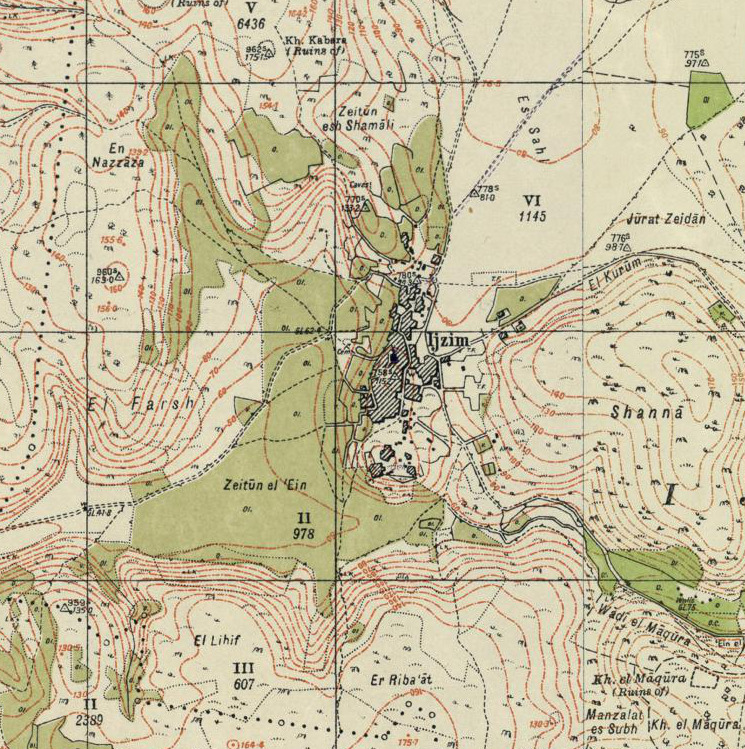
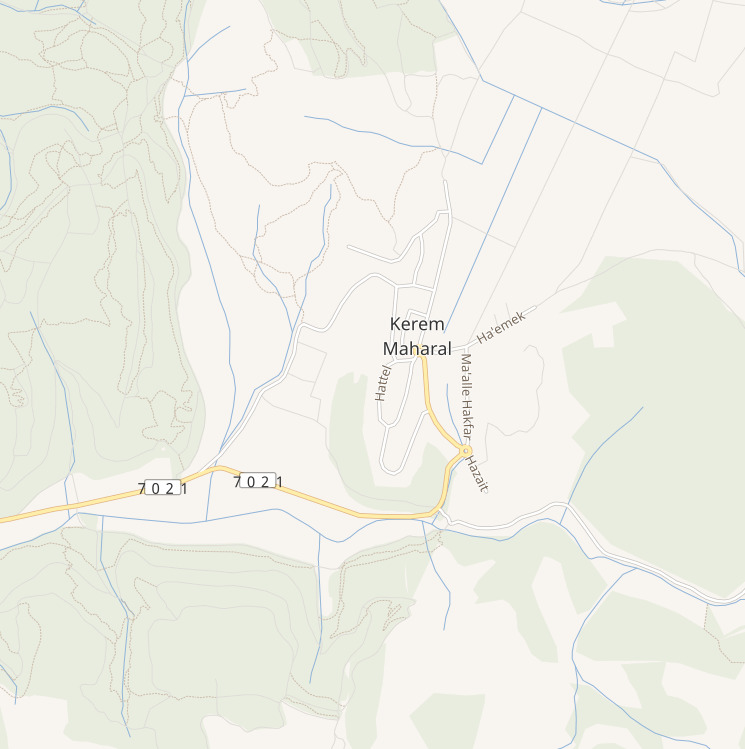
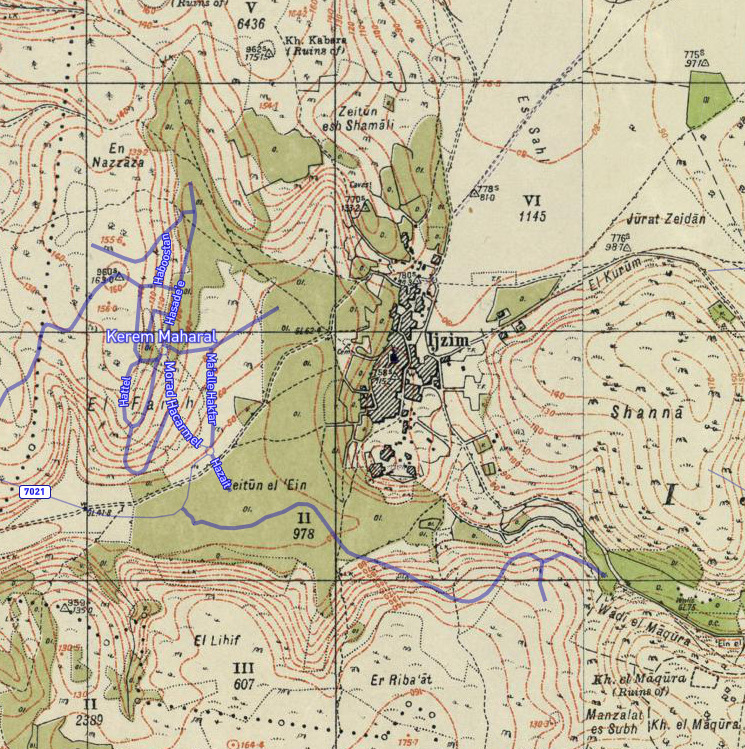
- 1870s map 1940s map modern map 1940s with modern overlay map A series of historical maps of the area around Ijzim (click the buttons)

- Location within Mandatory Palestine
- Coordinates: 32°38′41″N 34°59′17″E
- Palestine grid: 149/227
- Geopolitical entity: Mandatory Palestine
- Subdistrict: Haifa
- Date of depopulation: 24–26 July 1948

Population (1945)
  - Total: 2,970
- Cause(s) of depopulation: Military assault by Yishuv forces
- Current Localities: Kerem Maharal

Ijzim (Arabic: إجزم) was a Palestinian village in the Haifa Subdistrict of British Mandate Palestine, 19.5 kilometers south of Haifa, that was depopulated during the 1948 Arab-Israeli war. Many residents resettled in Jenin after Operation Shoter on 24 July 1948.

Families from Ijzim include the Madis, the Nabhanis and the Alhassans. Collectively, these families owned over 40,000 dunams (40 km^{2}) of land, making the village one of the richest in Palestine.

== History ==
The site of the village shows evidence of habitation since prehistoric times. It flourished especially in the Byzantine and Mamluk periods. Multiple oil presses indicate a rural economy with olives as a major product.

=== Ottoman rule ===
In 1517 Ijzim was incorporated into the Ottoman Empire with the rest of Palestine. During the 16th and 17th centuries, it belonged to the Turabay Emirate (1517-1683), which encompassed also the Jezreel Valley, Haifa, Jenin, Beit She'an Valley, northern Jabal Nablus, Bilad al-Ruha/Ramot Menashe, and the northern part of the Sharon plain.

In 1596, Ijzim was a village in the nahiya of Shafa (liwa' of Lajjun), with a population of 10 Muslim households; an estimated 55 persons. The villagers paid a fixed tax rate of 25% on a number of crops, including wheat, barley, and olives as well as on other types of produce, such as goats and beehives; a total of 12,000 akçe.

The village appeared as Egzim on the map that Pierre Jacotin compiled during Napoleon's invasion of 1799.

Ijzim was the home of the Madi family and the largest locality in the region during part of the 18th and first half of the 19th century. The Madi family hailed from the coastal region south of Mount Carmel and the western slopes of Jabal Nablus. At the time, the Madi were the most influential family in the southern Galilee and on the coast. The family was particularly influential between the end of Jazzar Pasha´s rule (1804) and the Egyptian occupation (1831). Mas'ud al-Madi was the governor of Gaza at the time of the Egyptian invasion. He was killed in the peasant revolt in 1834, while other clan members were imprisoned. Some fled to Constantinople. After the return of the Ottomans, some family members were appointed as sheikhs or governors in Ijzim, Haifa, and Safad. By the 1850s, the al-Madi family of Ijzim no longer constituted a local power like some families of Nablus or Hebron.

In 1859 British Consul Rodgers visited the village and estimated that there were 1,000 inhabitants cultivating 64 feddans of land. The French explorer Victor Guérin visited in 1870 and found "an ancient marble column at the door of a mosque; in the valley below the village a large square well, built with regular stones and surmounted by a vaulted construction. Near the well a birket, no longer used, and partly filled up, and close at hand the foundations of an ancient tower, measuring 15 paces by 10, and built with large masonry." In 1873, the Survey of Western Palestine surveyed three ancient rock-cut tombs north of the village. The most known native families there was the (Zidan and Awaga (the largest family of the village) Ammar, Jizmawi, Bani Hermas (Beit Madi, Beit Khadish), Al-Awasi and Al-Zayd [and among them Mishnish], Al-Azayza Abd Al-Hadi, Al-Wishahi, Al-Balwata, Al-Tawafshah, Eid, Awad, Mohsen, Abu Hamda, Abu Shuqur, Abu Shuqair, Al-Wawi, Al-Jabr, Jiyab, Abu Omar, Abu Shakra and the heart of The Abd al-Mu’ti family: the family of Nawfal, al-Darawsheh, Abu Hamed, Abu Sariya, Abu Khalifa, al-Farayza, Asaad, al-Nabhani, Ghuraify, and Abu Harb).

=== British Mandate era ===
In the 1922 census of Palestine conducted by the British Mandate authorities, Ijzim had a population 1,610, one Christian and the rest Muslims. In the 1931 census Ijzim was counted together with Khirbat Al-Manara, Al-Mazar and Qumbaza. The total population was 2,160, 88 Christians, 2,082 Muslims, in a total of 442 houses.

In the 1945 statistics the population of Ijzim was 2,970; 2,830 Muslims and 140 Christians, and it had 45,905 dunams of land according to an official land and population survey. 2,367 dunams were for plantations and irrigable land, 17,791 for cereals, while 91 dunams were built-up (urban) land.

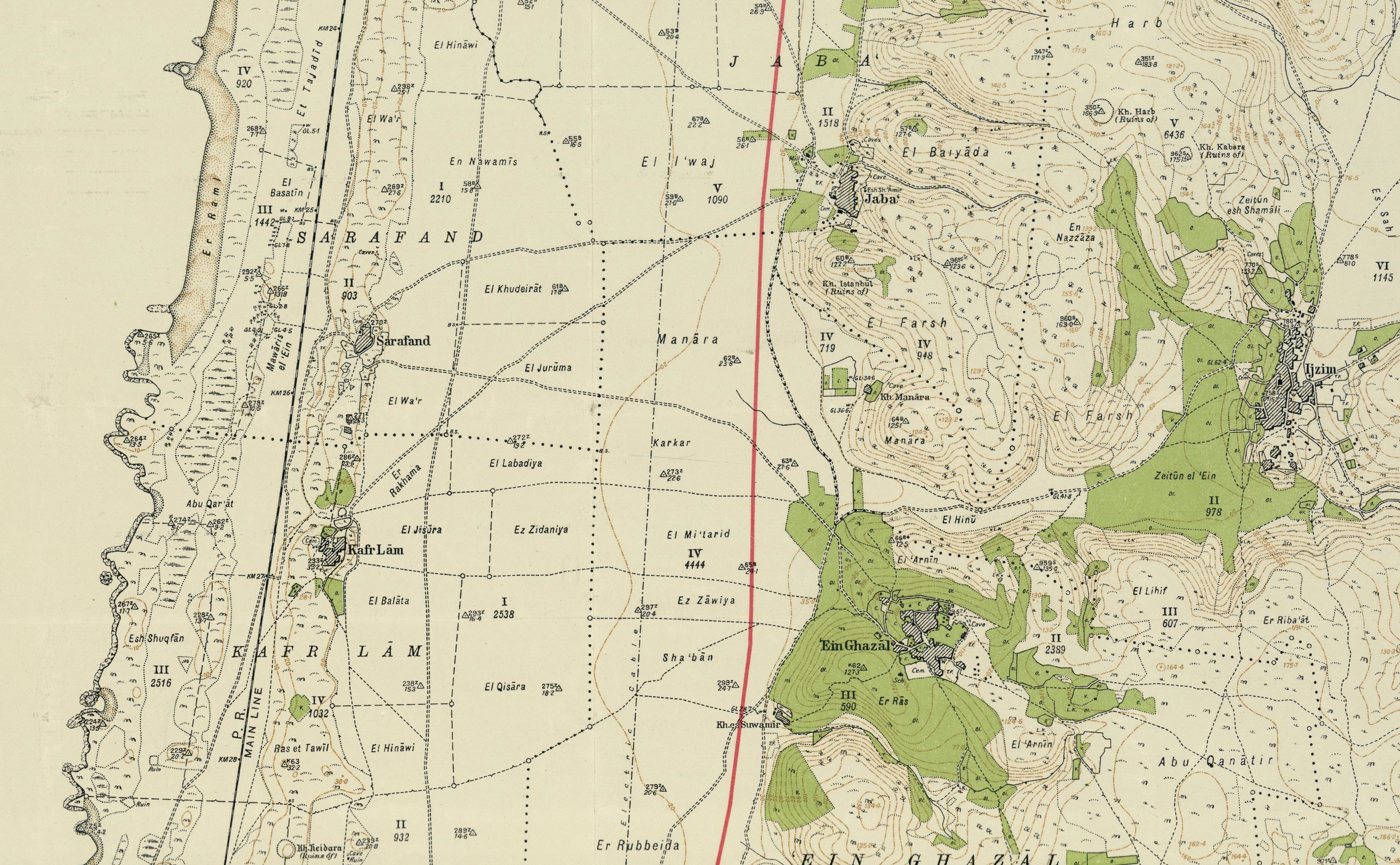
Ijzim (Ijizm) 1938 1:20,000

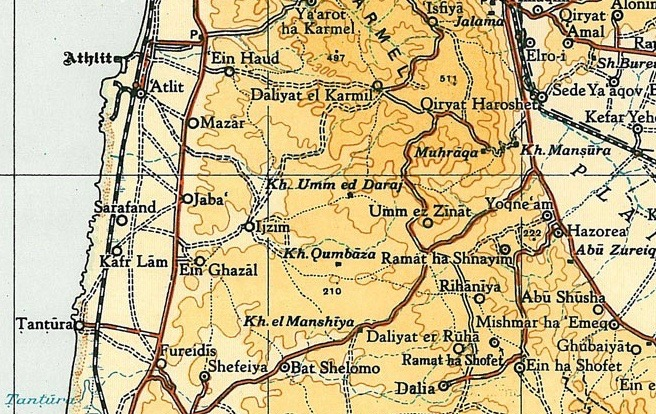
Ijzim (Ijizm) 1945 1:250,000

=== 1948 War and aftermath ===
Ijzim was one of the three villages in the Little Triangle that blocked the Jewish transportation in the main Tel Aviv-Haifa Highway for many months during the 1948 war. Jewish forces had twice attempted to capture the village unsuccessfully. Their third attempt on the 24 July 1948 involved the use of cannon fire and air strikes in a fierce battle that lasted two days. This took place during an official truce in the fighting, the attack was therefore called a "police action", and the Israeli authorities later lied to the United Nations, claiming that no military planes were involved. An Israeli intelligence officer later reported that upon entering the village on July 28 "our forces collected 200 corpses, many of them civilians killed by our bombardment".

With the conquest of Ijzim, the majority of the villagers either were expelled or fled. The majority ended up in the Jenin area, on the other side of the armistice lines drawn in 1949. Others took refuge in the nearby Druze village of Daliyat al-Carmel. There were several dozen people from Ijzim that were allowed to remain in their homes due to connections they enjoyed with influential Jews. These individuals continued to work their fertile land, sending the agricultural produce to Haifa. They were registered in the first Israeli census and received Israeli identity cards.

In December 1948, the Jewish protectors of the residents of Ijzim and the Haifa district military commander had a dispute over the villagers' continued presence there. It was decided that the villagers that had remained in Ijzim could stay and those who had taken refuge in Daliyat al-Carmel would be permitted to return. However, the district commander later went back on his word and ordered the eviction of the villagers, who then took shelter in the nearby village of Fureidis.

Meron Benvenisti submits that one of the considerations leading to the eviction of the inhabitants of Ijzim was the interest of settlement agency officials in turning Ijzim into an immigrant moshav. In the summer of 1949, just a few months after the villagers had been evicted, a moshav made up of immigrants from Czechoslovakia and Romania was established in Ijzim.

In many other villages depopulated during the 1948 Palestinian exodus, the Arab houses were demolished and permanent Jewish settlements were built where they had stood. However, the homes of Ijzim were maintained for habitation by the new immigrants. The al-Madi family's luxurious seventeenth-century madafeh (guest house, see Diwan-khane) was transformed into a museum and then the home of a Jewish family, the village school became a synagogue, and the village cemetery, a public park. The large village mosque, constructed in the nineteenth century, was left to fall into dereliction.

Some of the villagers of Ijzim attempted to hold on to their land, living for a few years in tin-roofed shacks and other temporary structures. However, all of them — with the exception of one family — finally broke down and agreed to exchange their land holdings in Ijzim for building plots in the village of Fureidis. The one Arab family that withstood the pressure to leave continues to live in its own house beside a sacred spring called Sitt Maqura, where today both Arabs and Jews come to pray and light candles.

Ami Ayalon, a former head of the Shin Bet secret service agency, lives in one of the former houses of Ijzim.

Andrew Petersen, an archaeologist specializing in Islamic architecture, surveyed the village in 1994, and described two larger structures; the mosque and the "castle".

Ijzim is among the Palestinian villages for which commemorative Marches of Return have taken place, such as those organized by the Association for the Defence of the Rights of the Internally Displaced.

== Demographics ==
Population of Ijzim/Kerem Maharal by Year and Religion
Year	Christians	Muslims	Jews	Total Population
1596	0	10 households	0	55
1859	-	-	0	1,000
1887	0	1,710	0	1,710
1922	1	1,609	0	1,610
1945	140	2,830	0	2,970
1949: Established Kerem Maharal as a Jewish Moshav
1950	-	>100	-	-
1960	0	>10	-	-
1970	0	>10	-	-
1980	0	1	-	-
2006	0	0	566	566
2011	0	0	634	634

== Notable people ==
- Adnan Awad, politician, revolutionary
- Mas'ud al-Madi, politician, revolutionary
- Mu'in al-Madi, politician
- Taqiuddin al-Nabhani, judge, Islamic scholar, politician
- Yusuf an-Nabhani, judge, poet, Islamic scholar

== See also ==
- Depopulated Palestinian locations in Israel

== Bibliography ==
- Uzi ‘Ad and Kareem Sa‘id (2021). "Remains from the prehistoric to the late Ottoman periods at Kerem Maharal". 'Atiqot. 105: 69–199, 168–171.
- Barron, J.B., ed. (1923). Palestine: Report and General Abstracts of the Census of 1922. Government of Palestine.
- Benvenisti, M. (2000). Sacred Landscape: The Buried History of the Holy Land Since 1948. University of California Press. ISBN 978-0-520-23422-2.
- Ben-Ze'ev, Efrat (2002). "The Palestinian village of Ijzim during the 1948 war: Forming an anthropological history through villagers accounts and army documents". History and Anthropology. 13 (1): 13–30. doi:10.1080/02757200290002860. ISSN 0275-7206.
- Conder, C.R.; Kitchener, H.H. (1882). The Survey of Western Palestine: Memoirs of the Topography, Orography, Hydrography, and Archaeology. Vol. 2. London: Committee of the Palestine Exploration Fund.
- Government of Palestine, Department of Statistics (1945). Village Statistics, April, 1945.
- Guérin, V. (1875). Description Géographique Historique et Archéologique de la Palestine (in French). Vol. 2: Samarie, pt. 2. Paris: L'Imprimerie Nationale.
- Hadawi, S. (1970). Village Statistics of 1945: A Classification of Land and Area ownership in Palestine. Palestine Liberation Organization Research Center.
- Hütteroth, W.-D.; Abdulfattah, K. (1977). Historical Geography of Palestine, Transjordan and Southern Syria in the Late 16th Century. Erlanger Geographische Arbeiten, Sonderband 5. Erlangen, Germany: Vorstand der Fränkischen Geographischen Gesellschaft. ISBN 3-920405-41-2.
- Karmon, Y. (1960). "An Analysis of Jacotin's Map of Palestine" (PDF). Israel Exploration Journal. 10 (3, 4): 155–173, 244–253. Archived from the original (PDF) on 2019-12-22.
- Khalidi, W. (1992). All That Remains: The Palestinian Villages Occupied and Depopulated by Israel in 1948. Washington D.C.: Institute for Palestine Studies. ISBN 0-88728-224-5.
- Mills, E., ed. (1932). Census of Palestine 1931. Population of Villages, Towns and Administrative Areas. Jerusalem: Government of Palestine.
- Morris, B. (2004). The Birth of the Palestinian Refugee Problem Revisited. Cambridge University Press. ISBN 978-0-521-00967-6.
- Mülinen, Egbert Friedrich von 1908, Beiträge zur Kenntnis des Karmels "Separateabdruck aus der Zeitschrift des Deutschen Palëstina-Vereins Band XXX (1907) Seite 117-207 und Band XXXI (1908) Seite 1-258." Ikzim p.287 ff
- Palmer, E.H. (1881). The Survey of Western Palestine: Arabic and English Name Lists Collected During the Survey by Lieutenants Conder and Kitchener, R. E. Transliterated and Explained by E.H. Palmer. Committee of the Palestine Exploration Fund.
- Pappé, I. (2006). The Ethnic Cleansing of Palestine. London and New York: Oneworld. ISBN 1-85168-467-0.
- Petersen, Andrew (2001). A Gazetteer of Buildings in Muslim Palestine (British Academy Monographs in Archaeology). Vol. 1. Oxford University Press. ISBN 978-0-19-727011-0.
- Rogers, Edward Thomas (1855) Notices of the modern Samaritans: illustrated by incidents in the life of Jacob Esh Shelaby Published by S.Low, 55 pages
- Schölch, Alexander (1993). Palestine in Transformation, 1856-1882: Studies in Social, Economic, and Political Development (PDF). Institute for Palestine Studies. ISBN 0-88728-234-2.
- Schumacher, G. (1888). "Population list of the Liwa of Akka". Quarterly Statement - Palestine Exploration Fund. 20: 169–191.
- Sharon, M. (2013). Corpus Inscriptionum Arabicarum Palaestinae, H-I. Vol. 5. BRILL. ISBN 978-90-04-25097-0. (Sharon, 2013, p. 303)
