= Hayim ben Bezalel =

German rabbi (died 1588)

Rabbi Hayim ben Bezalel
- חיים בן בצלאל
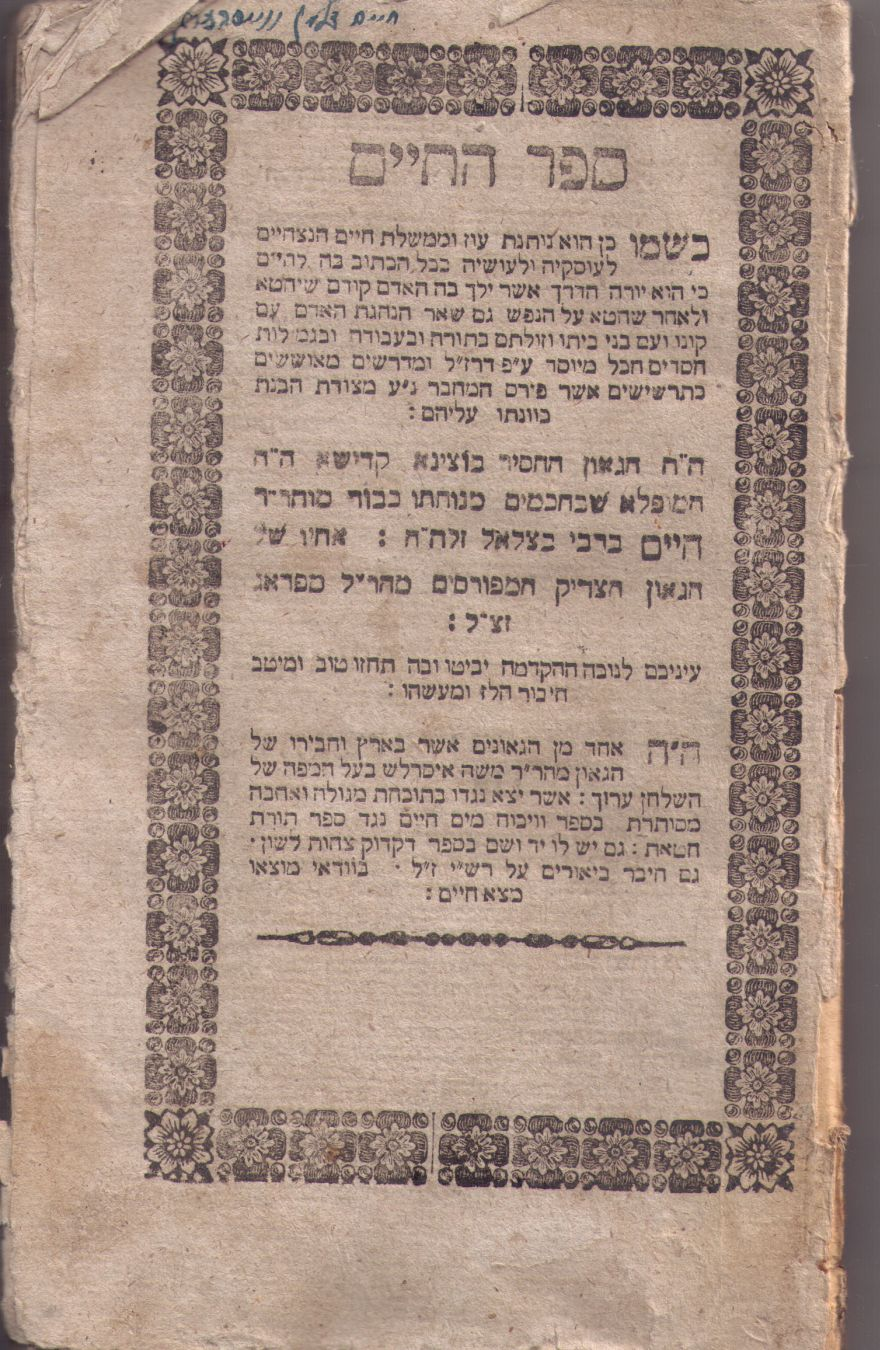
- Title page of "Sefer ha-Ḥayim"

Personal life
- Born: Posen
- Died: Shavuot, 1588 Friedberg
- Parent: Bezalel ben Hayim (father)

Religious life
- Religion: Judaism

Ḥayim ben Beẓalel (also spelled Ḥayyim ben Bezaleel; died 1588) was a German rabbi and Talmudist and the elder brother of Judah Loew ben Bezalel of Prague.

He was the eldest of the four sons of Beẓalel ben Ḥayim, and spent his youth at Posen, the native city of the family (compare "Monatsschrift für die Geschichte und Wissenschaft des Judenthums," xiii. 371). He and Moses Isserles studied with Shalom Shachna, whose methods of teaching he adopted largely. He began his literary activity at Worms, where he had gone in 1549; and, apparently, he succeeded his uncle Jakob ben Chajim as rabbi in that city, after Jakob's death in 1563 (compare his introduction to "Mayim Ḥayim" (Hebrew: מים חיים), printed in "Ha-Shiloaḥ," § 9). He subsequently went as rabbi to Friedberg; in 1578 this district was ravaged by a terrible plague, which caused the death of one of Ḥayim's servants. In consequence of this occurrence Ḥayim and his family were quarantined in his house for two months. During this time he wrote his ethical work "Sefer ha-Ḥayim" (Hebrew: ספר החיים), consisting of five books.

Ḥayim carried on a heated controversy with his former schoolfellow Moses Isserles, also indirectly aiming at Joseph Karo. He did not approve of their attempts to collect the laws found in the Talmud and other authoritative works in a book suitable for the general public. The reasons for his objections he set forth in the introduction to his "Mayim Ḥayim" (Hebrew: מים חיים), which includes a criticism of Moses Isserles' "Torat ha-Ḥaṭṭot" (Hebrew: תורת החטאת). Ḥayim held that through such codices the study of the Talmud would be neglected and the standing of the rabbis injured, since every layman could turn to these books for the solution of difficult questions. Moreover, the writer of such codes would gain too much authority over other teachers, whereas every rabbi ought to arrive at his decisions independently. Such codes, moreover, could not take into account the minhagim of all countries; and this, again, would lead to constraint in matters of conscience, since every one would have to observe the minhagim obtaining in the place where the author of the code in question was living.

Ḥayim died at Friedberg on the Shavuot festival, 1588.

== Works ==
Ḥayim's works include:

- "Sefer ha-Ḥayim" (Hebrew: ספר החיים), Kraków, 1593; Amsterdam, 1713; Lemberg, 1887;
- "Mayim Ḥayim" (Hebrew: מים חיים), Amsterdam, 1711; Lemberg, without introduction;
- "Iggeret ha-Tiyyul" (Hebrew: אגרת הטיול), Scriptural comments in alphabetical order, Prague, 1605, and Offenbach, 1717;
- "'Eẓ ha-Ḥayim" (Hebrew: עץ החיים);
- "Be'er Mayim Ḥayim" (Hebrew: באר מים חיים), supercommentary to Rashi's commentary on the Torah.
