= Mas'ud al-Madi =

Palestinian politician (died 1834)

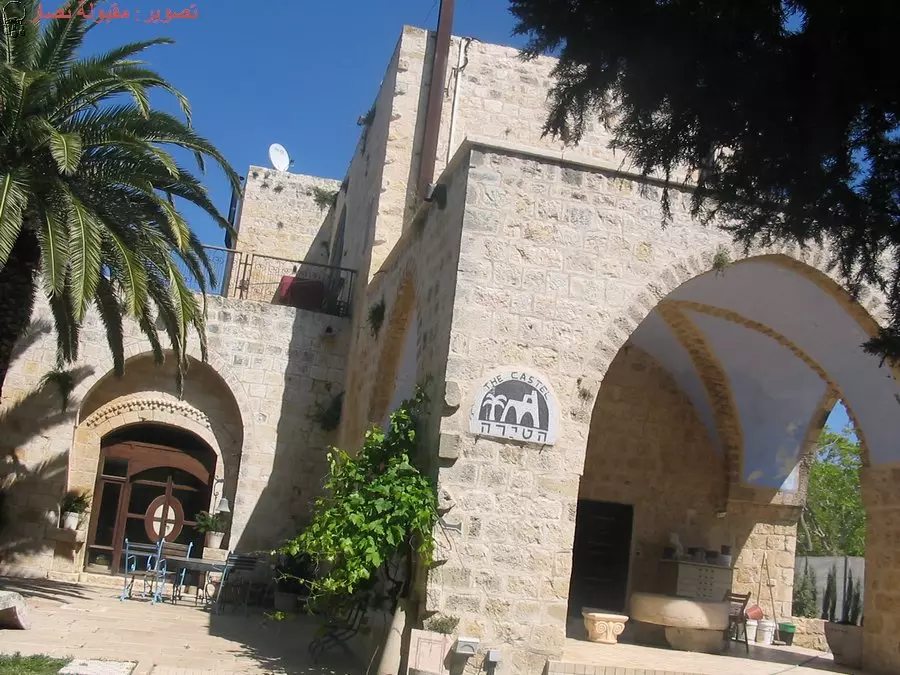
Mas'ud al-Madi's 18th-century guest-house, presently a hotel

Mas'ud al-Madi (died 1834) was a local Arab political figure in Palestine in the first half of the 19th century, during Ottoman and Egyptian rule. The Banu Madi had Bedouin tribal roots in the Beersheba area. They later made the village of Ijzim in northern Palestine, near Haifa, their seat of power. Mas'ud was a local sheikh and allied himself with Sulayman Pasha, the governor of Acre between 1804 and 1819. During that period, Sulayman appointed Mas'ud mutasallim of Haifa and the Atlit coast, an area that stretched between the village of Umm Khalid near Jaffa up until the area just south of Acre. By 1830, he became the mutasallim (tax collector) of Jaffa. He was also the mutasallim of Gaza, Ramla and Lydda. He resided in a large house in Acre. Mas'ud was executed by Ibrahim Pasha in 1834, during Egyptian rule, for his role in the countrywide Peasants' Revolt in Palestine.

Mas'ud's 18th century "diwan or meeting house" in Ijzim is today a hotel in Kerem Maharal, marketed as dating back to the "crusader period".

== Bibliography ==
- Petersen, Andrew (2001). A Gazetteer of Buildings in Muslim Palestine (British Academy Monographs in Archaeology). Vol. 1. Oxford University Press. pp. 154–156. ISBN 978-0-19-727011-0. Archived from the original on 2021-05-29.
- Philipp, T. (2013). Acre: The Rise and Fall of a Palestinian City, 1730-1831. Columbia University Press. ISBN 9780231506038.
- Schölch, A. (1984). "The Decline of Local Power in Palestine after 1856: The Case of ʿAqīl Aġā". Die Welt des Islams. New Series. 23 (1/4). BRILL: 458–475. doi:10.2307/1570684. JSTOR 1570684.
- Yazbak, M. (1998). Haifa in the Late Ottoman Period, A Muslim Town in Transition, 1864–1914. Brill Academic Pub. ISBN 90-04-11051-8.
