= Judah Loew ben Bezalel =

Czech rabbi and Kabbalist (d. 1609)

Rabbi Judah Loew ben Bezalel
- יהודה ליווא בן בצלאל
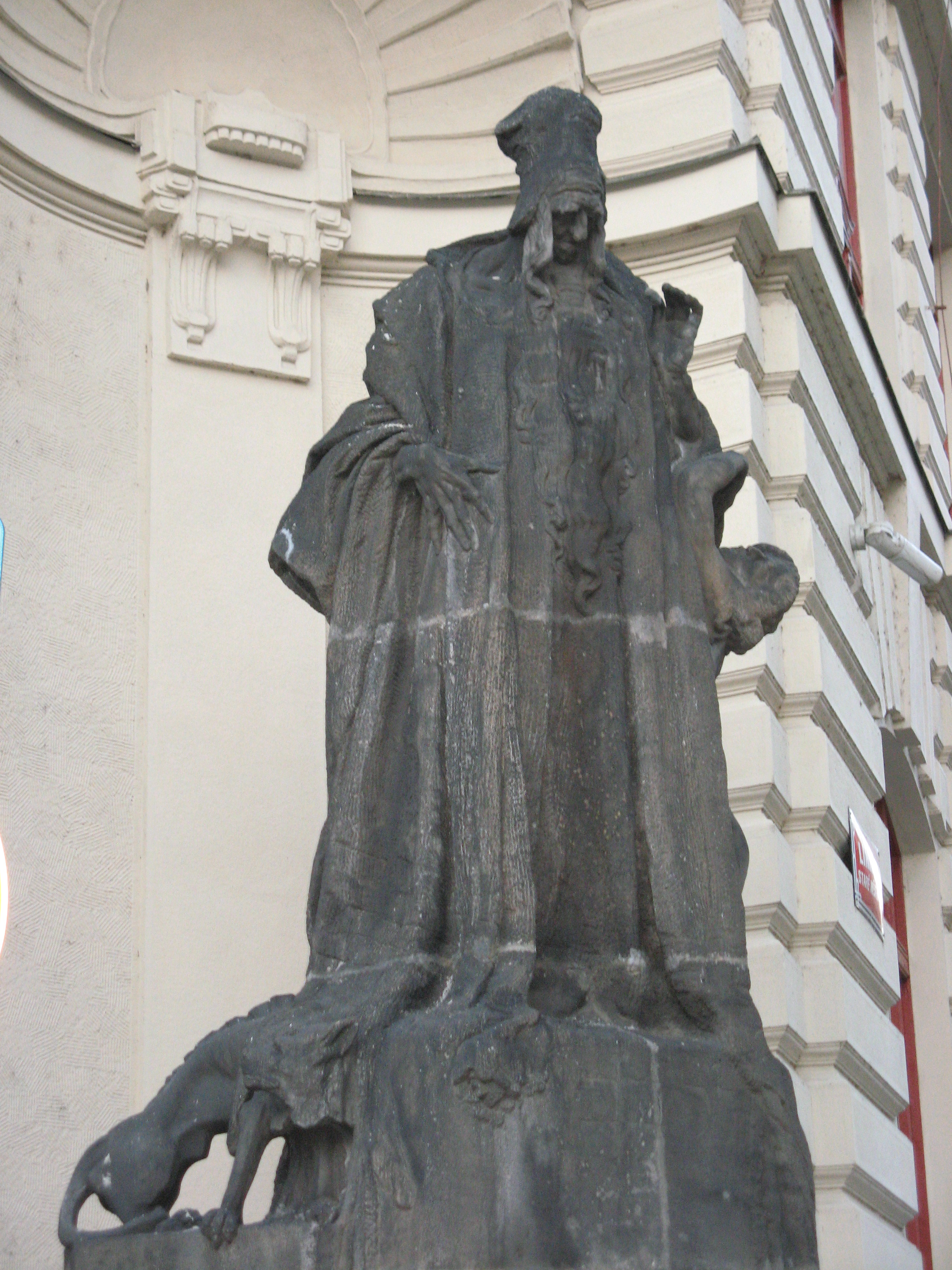
- Statue of Loew at the New City Hall of Prague

Personal life
- Born: c. 1524 Poznań, Poland
- Died: 17 September 1609 (aged 84–85) Prague, Bohemia, Holy Roman Empire
- Buried: Old Jewish Cemetery, Prague
- Parent: Bezalel (father)

Religious life
- Religion: Judaism

Judah Loew ben Bezalel (Hebrew: יהודה ליווא בן בצלאל; c. 1524 (Note: Putik and Polakoviç's research has uncovered systematic and almost certainly deliberate errors in one of the most widely cited reference texts (including in this article) on Maharal, the Megillat Yuhasin (1745) by Meir Perels. As scholars work to disentangle fact from error and fancy in this nonetheless indispensable reference text, commissioned by the great-grandson of Maharal, readers and editors should regard with caution claims about Maharal's age, background, and family, which have filtered down from Perels's work to much scholarship. Although Putik and Polakoviç remain puzzled about why Perels—a professional genealogist—committed this act of historical vandalism, they speculate that it may have to do with a family antagonism: the father-in-law and teacher of Perels's great-grandfather, Eleazar, a kabbalist named Isaac ben Jekutiel Katz Kuskes quarreled with Maharal and was forced as a result to leave the city of Poznań.) – 17 September 1609), also known as Rabbi Loew (alt. Löw, Loewe, Löwe or Levai), the Maharal of Prague (Hebrew: מהר״ל מפראג), or simply the Maharal (the Hebrew acronym of "Moreinu ha-Rav Loew", "Our Teacher, Rabbi Loew"), was an important Talmudic scholar, Jewish mystic, mathematician, astronomer, and philosopher who, for most of his life, served as a leading rabbi in the cities of Mikulov in Moravia and Prague in Bohemia.

Loew wrote on Jewish philosophy and Jewish mysticism. His work Gur Aryeh al HaTorah is a supercommentary on Rashi's Torah commentary. He is also the subject of a later legend that he created the Golem of Prague, an animate being fashioned from clay.

== Name ==
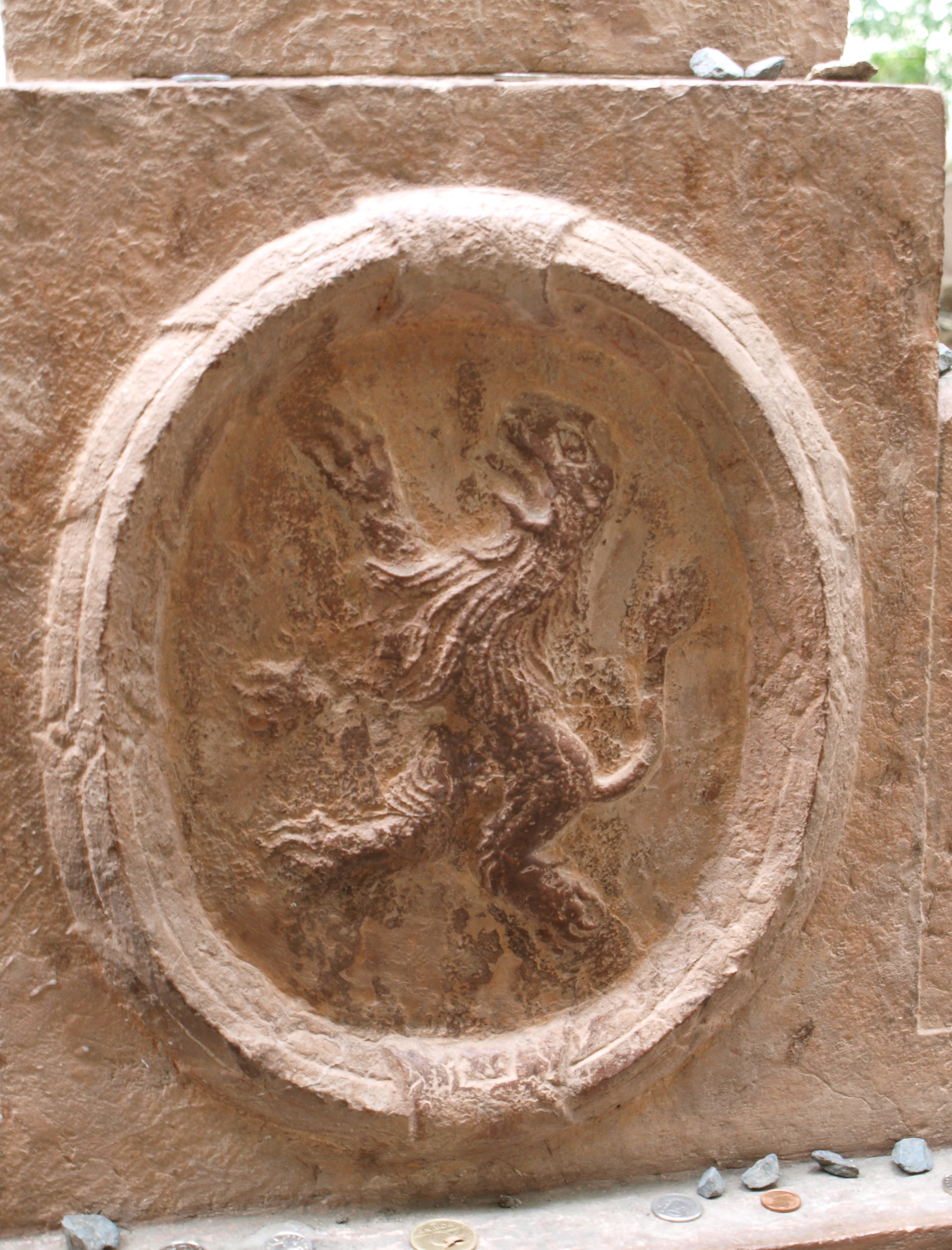
Lion of Judah on the Maharal's gravestone.

His name "Löw" or "Loew" is derived from the German Löwe, "lion" (cf. the Yiddish Leib of the same origin). It is a kinnui, or substitute name, for the Hebrew name Judah or Yehuda, as the Biblical character Judah was likened to a lion in Genesis 49:9. Lavi from that verse on Judah, is a lioness, hence his name Yehudah Lavi. In Jewish naming tradition, the Hebrew name and the substitute name are often combined as a pair, as in this case in which the combined name is Judah Loew. When Loew wrote his classic supercommentary on Rashi's Torah commentary, he entitled it Gur Aryeh al HaTorah in Hebrew, meaning "Young Lion [commenting] upon the Torah".

Loew's tomb in Prague is decorated with a heraldic shield with a lion with two intertwined tails (queue fourchee), alluding both to his first name and to Bohemia, the arms of which has a two-tailed lion.

== Biography ==
=== Early life ===
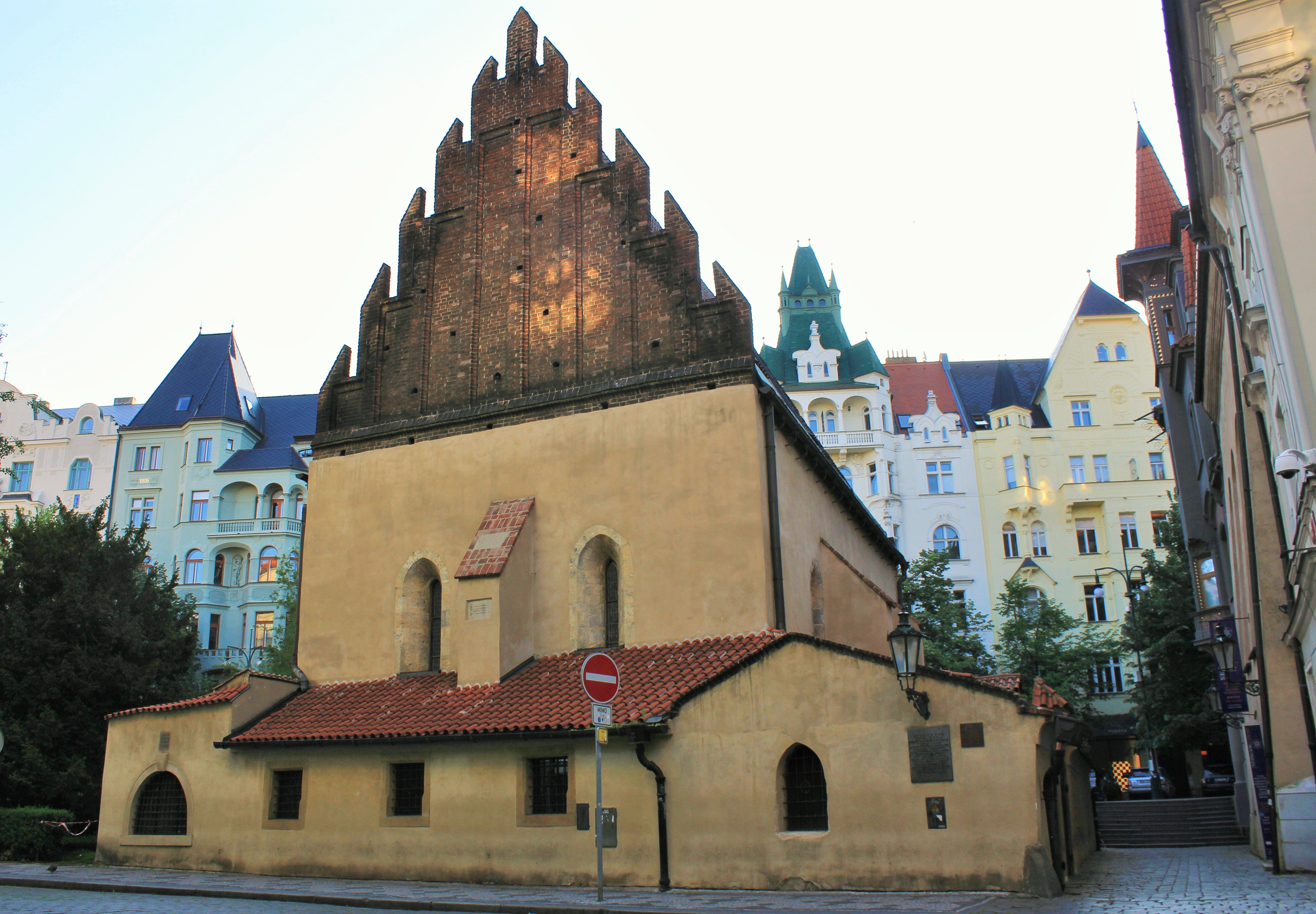
The Old New Synagogue, Prague where he officiated

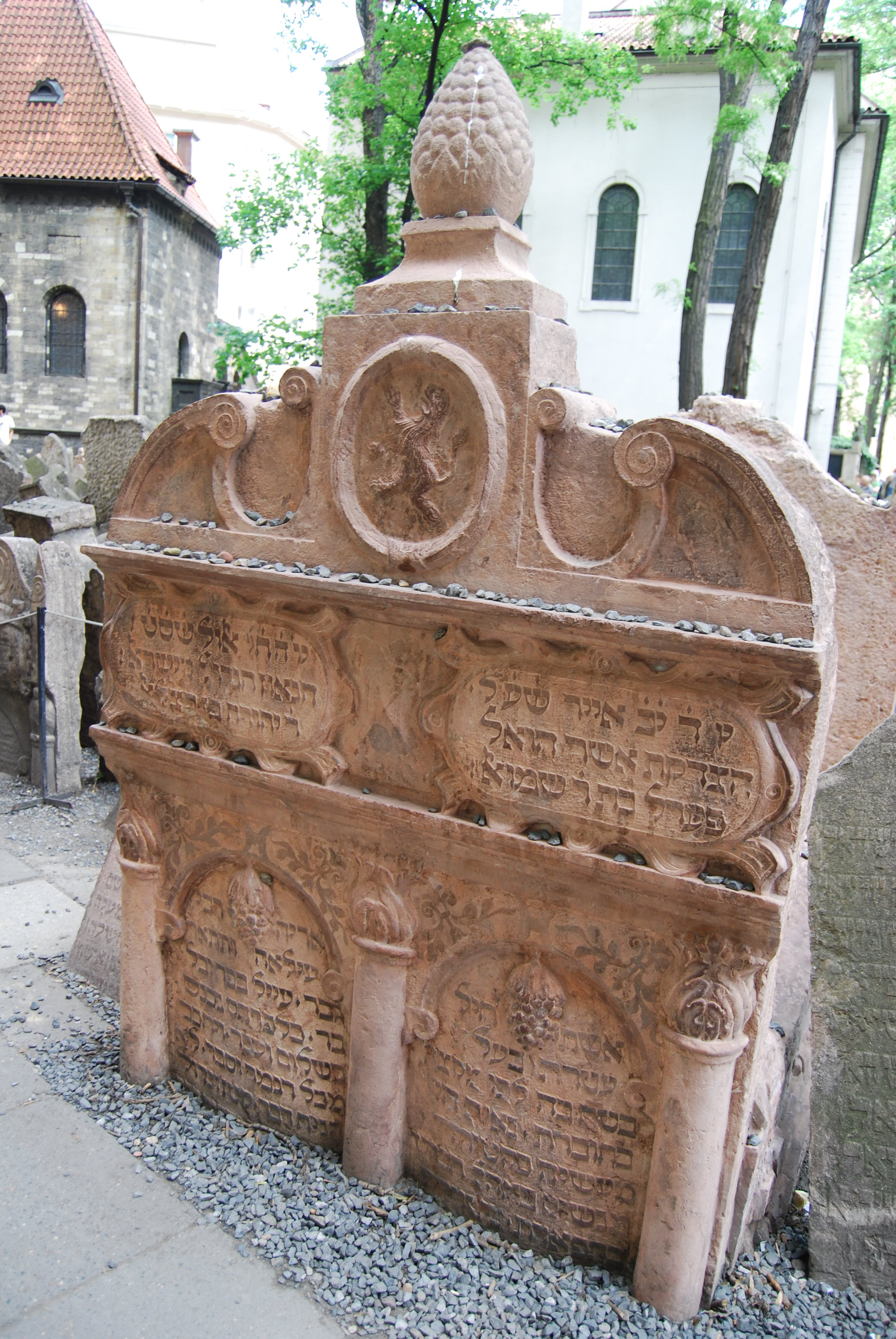
Loew's tombstone in the Old Jewish Cemetery, Prague

Loew was probably born in Poznań, Poland—though Perels lists the birth town mistakenly as Worms in the Holy Roman Empire—to Rabbi Bezalel (Loew), whose family originated from the Rhenish town of Worms. Perels claimed that his grandfather Chajim of Worms was the grandson of Judah Leib the Elder and thus a claimant to the Davidic line, through Sherira Gaon. However, modern scholars such as Otto Muneles have challenged this. Prior to the publication of Perels' genealogy in 1853, traditions existed of the Maharal's descent from the House of David, not through Yehudah Leib the Elder or Hai Gaon, but through Rashi and his ancestor Yokhanan the Sandlar (died 140 C.E.). Loew's birth year is uncertain, with different sources listing 1512, 1520 and 1526. His uncle Jakob ben Chajim was Reichsrabbiner ("Rabbi of the Empire") of the Holy Roman Empire, and his older brother Chaim of Friedberg was a famous rabbinical scholar and Rabbi of Worms and Friedberg.

Sources in the Lubavitch tradition say that at the age of 12, Loew went to yeshivahs in Poland and studied under Rabbi Yaakov Pollak. After Pollak left Poland, Loew spent 2 years wandering from place to place and then went onto the yeshivah of Rabbi Yitzchak Clover/Wormz, himself a student of Pollak. He learnt together in yeshivah with the Maharshal who was 17, 2 years his elder. He learnt together with the Maharshal and Rema for a further 3 years. Rav Yitzchok Clover was in fact the grandfather of the Maharshal. The Maharshal left Poland and the Maharal remained and studied with the Rema for 2 more years. Maharal was 6 years his senior. He spent 20 years studying before he married.

=== Career ===
Loew accepted a rabbinical position in 1553 as Landesrabbiner of Moravia at Mikulov (Nikolsburg), directing community affairs but also determining which tractate of the Talmud was to be studied in the communities in that province. He also revised the community statutes on the election and taxation process. Although he retired from Moravia in 1573 the communities still considered him an authority long after that.

One of his activities in Moravia was the rallying against slanderous slurs on legitimacy (Nadler) that were spread in the community against certain families and could ruin the finding of a marriage partner for the children of those families. This phenomenon even affected his own family. He used one of the two yearly grand sermons (between Rosh Hashanah and Yom Kippur 1583) to denounce the phenomenon.

Loew moved to Prague in 1573, where he again accepted a rabbinical position, replacing the retired Isaac Hayoth. He immediately reiterated his views on Nadler. On 23 February 1592, he had an audience with Emperor Rudolf II, which he attended together with his brother Sinai and his son-in-law Isaac Cohen; Prince Bertier was present with the emperor. The conversation seems to have been related to Kabbalah (Jewish mysticism, Hebrew: קַבָּלָה) a subject which held much fascination for the emperor.

In 1592, Loew moved to Poznań, where he had been elected as Chief Rabbi of Poland. In Poznań he composed Netivoth Olam and part of Derech Chaim (see below).

=== Personal life ===
Loew's family consisted of his wife, Perel, six daughters, and a son, Bezalel, who became a rabbi in Kolín, but died early in 1600. His wife was the daughter of a wealthy merchant, which allowed him to devote himself to scholarship. His granddaughter was Eva Bachrach, was known for her scholarship and for the title of the book Havvot Yair, authored by her grandson, Yair Bachrach.

His elder brother was Hayim ben Bezalel, who authored a legal work Vikuach Mayim Chaim which challenged the rulings of Krakow legalist, Moshe Isserles.

=== Death ===
Towards the end of his life Loew moved back to Prague, where he died in 1609. Loew is buried at the Old Jewish Cemetery, Prague in Josefov, where his grave and tombstone are intact.

== Methodology ==
Loew's numerous philosophical works have become cornerstones of Jewish thought; and he was the author of "one of the most creative and original systems of thought developed by East European Jewry."

He employed rationalist terminology and classical philosophical ideas in his writings, and supported scientific research on condition that it did not contradict divine revelation. Nevertheless, Loew's work was in many ways a reaction to the tradition of medieval rationalist Jewish thought, which prioritized a systematic analysis of philosophical concepts, and implicitly downgraded the more colorful and ad-hoc imagery of earlier rabbinic commentary. One of Loew's constant objectives was to demonstrate how such earlier commentary was in fact full of insightful commentary on humanity, nature, holiness, an other topics. According to Loew, the multitude of disconnected opinions and perspectives in classical rabbinic literature do not form a haphazard jumble, but rather exemplify the diversity of meanings that can be extracted from a single idea or concept.

Loew's writings use as sources the Biblical verses and the recorded traditions of the rabbis, but through literary and conceptual analysis he develops these into a comprehensive philosophical system in which the following terminology recurs:

- seder and nivdal ("order" and "transcendence") – any realm has a natural "order" and nature, but may also contain exceptions which are entirely unlike the realm in nature.
- guf, nefesh, sechel ("body", "life-force", "intellect") – different levels of a single overall reality. guf (the material) is bounded in dimension and is acted upon. Nefesh is unbounded, and both acts and is acted upon. Sechel is unbounded, and tends only to act.
- pail, nifal (active, acted upon) – describing the relationship between different levels of reality.
- yesodot, taarovot, tarkovot (bases, mixtures, combinations) – when different elements of reality are combined, they may remain as separate "bases", or else form a relationship (a "mixture"), or else generate an entirely new entity ("combinations").
- ribui, ahadut (multiplicity, unity).

An example of this terminology is Loew's philosophical interpretation of the following midrash: "The world was created for three things: challah, maaser, and bikkurim." According to Loew, bikkurim represents yesodot (as individual fruit are given), maaser represents taarovot (as the fruit are gathered together and a fraction of them separated as a tithe), and challah represents tarkovot (as a new substance, dough, is created from the ingredients).

To resolve contradictions between rabbinic literature and historical sources, Loew's approach emphasizes his preference for allegorization. He often interprets seemingly historical rabbinic narratives as conveying deeper, esoteric truths rather than literal historical events. For example, in the case of Titus and the yetosh, Loew argues that the Talmudic story is not a factual account but a moral lesson about divine retribution. While he critiques Azariah de Rossi's rejectionist tendencies, Loew himself avoids outright rejection of rabbinic texts, instead reinterpreting them to align with spiritual or metaphysical truths. His approach thus reflects a commitment to preserving the integrity of rabbinic literature while addressing historical challenges creatively.

Loew did not espouse kabbalah or other Jewish mystical traditions, though he was familiar with them.

== Thought ==
Loew's worldview assumes that reality consists of a single cause, as well as diverse caused phenomena whose existence is constantly sustained by their cause. There is no room for randomness in reality, as that would indicate an absence of omnipotence or omniscience in the Cause. For Loew, the uniform caused nature of reality also indicates the existence of moral order in the world. Science can describe the phenomena in the world, but it cannot create a preference for one over the other; such moral preferences must come from the higher order of the Torah, which Loew calls the "higher intellect" (שכל עליון).

Loew emphasized the value of honesty and straightforwardness. Among other things, this led him to criticize the pilpul methodology common in yeshivas of his time. He even suggested to avoid learning the commentaries of Tosafot until one has reached an advanced level of understanding. He suggested that if the commentaries of Rabbeinu Asher were printed in place of Tosafot, halacha-oriented study would be much more pervasive.

Like Yehudah Halevi, he focused on the distinction between the physical and the spiritual, seeing the Jewish people as possessing an essentially spiritual nature which distinguishes it from all other phenomena in the world.

== Influence ==
=== Disciples ===
It is unknown how many Talmudic rabbinical scholars Loew taught in Moravia, but the main disciples from the Prague period include Rabbis Yom-Tov Lipmann Heller and David Gans. The former promoted his teacher's program of regular Mishnah study by the masses, and composed his Tosefoth Yom Tov (a Mishnah commentary incorporated into almost all published editions of the Mishnah over the past few hundred years) with this goal in mind. David Ganz wrote Tzemach David, a work of Jewish and general history, as well as writing on astronomy; both Loew and Ganz were in contact with Tycho Brahe, the famous astronomer.

=== Commemoration ===
Kerem Maharal, a moshav in northern Israel, was established by Czech Jewish immigrants and named in Loew's honour.

In April 1997, Czech Republic and Israel jointly issued a set of stamps, one of which featured the tombstone of Loew. In May 2009, the Czech Post issued a stamp commemorating the 400th anniversary of rabbi Loew's death. In June 2009 the Czech Mint issued a commemorative coin marking the same milestone. The Statue of Judah Loew ben Bezalel stands in Prague.

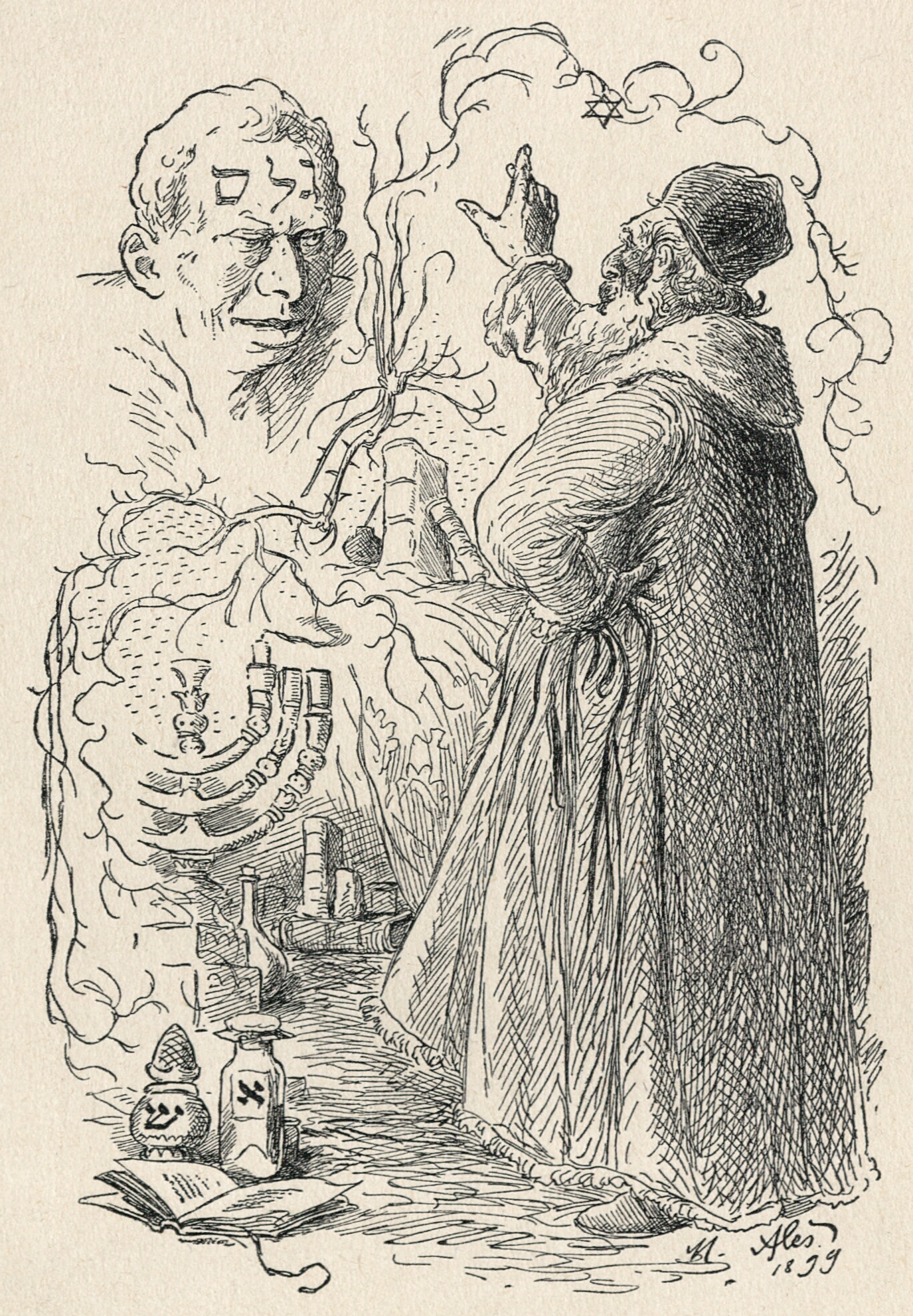
Loew and Golem by Mikoláš Aleš, 1899.

== Legend of the golem ==
Loew is the subject of the legend about the creation of a golem, a creature made out of clay to defend the Jews of the Prague Ghetto from antisemitic attacks, particularly the blood libel. He is said to have used mystical powers based on the esoteric knowledge of how God created Adam. The general view of historians and critics is that the legend is a German literary invention of the early 19th century. The earliest known source for the story thus far is the 1834 book Der Jüdische Gil Blas by Friedrich Korn. It has been repeated and adapted many times since.

== Works ==
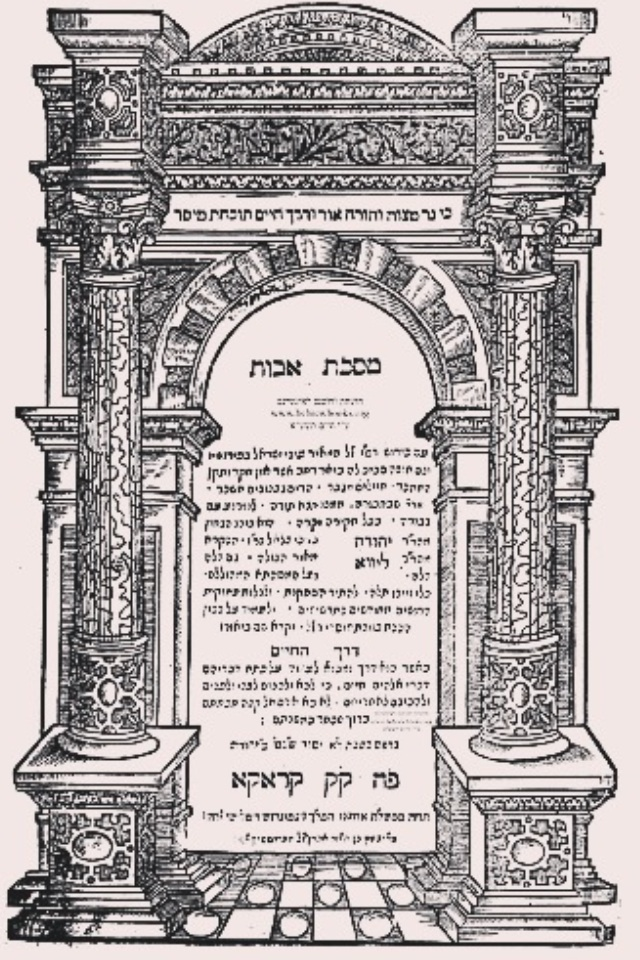
Derech Chaim (Cracow edition)

He began publishing his books at a very late age. In 1578, at the age of 66, he published his first book, Gur Aryeh ("Young Lion", Prague 1578) – a supercommentary in five volumes for Rashi's commentary on the Torah, which goes well beyond that, and four years later he published his book Gevuroth HaShem ("God's Might[y Acts]", Cracow 1582) anonymously.

- Gur Aryeh ("Young Lion", Prague 1578), a supercommentary on Rashi's Pentateuch commentary, often "deeply philosophical or mystical"
- Gevuroth Hashem ("God's Mighty Acts", Cracow 1582), for the holiday of Passover – On the Exodus and the Miracles
- Derech Chaim ("Way of Life", Cracow 1589), a commentary on the Mishnah tractate Avoth
- Derashot ("Sermons", Prague 1589 and 1593), collected edition by Haim Pardes, Tel Aviv 1996
- Netivoth Olam ("Pathways of the World", Prague 1595–1596), a work of ethics
- Be'er ha-Golah ("The Well of Exile", Prague 1598), an explanatory work on the Talmudic and Midrashic Aggadah, mainly responding to interpretations by the Italian scholar Azariah dei Rossi (Azariah min ha-Adumim)
- Netzach Yisrael ("The Eternity of Israel", Prague 1599; Netzach "eternity", has the same root as the word for victory), on Tisha B'Av (an annual day of mourning about the destruction of the Temples and the Jewish exile) and the final deliverance
- Tif'ereth Yisrael ("The Glory of Israel", Venice 1599), philosophical exposition on the Torah, intended for the holiday of Shavuot
- Or Chadash ("A New Light", Prague 1600), on Purim
- Ner Mitzvah ("The Candle of the Commandment", Prague 1600), on Hanukkah
- Chiddushei Aggadot ("Novellae on the Aggada", the narrative portions of the Talmud), discovered in the 20th century
- Divrei Negidim ("Words of Rectors"), a commentary on the Seder of Pesach, published by a descendant
- Chiddushim al Ha-Shas, a commentary on Talmud, recently published for the first time from a manuscript by Machon Yerushalayim on Bava Metzia, Shabbos, and Eruvin; others may be forthcoming
- Various other works, such as his responsa and works on the Jewish Sabbath and the holidays of Sukkot, Rosh Hashana and Yom Kippur, have not been preserved.

His works on the holidays bear titles that were inspired by the Biblical verse in I Chronicles 29:11: "Yours, O Lord, are the greatness, and the might, and the glory, and the victory, and the majesty, for all that is in the heavens and on the earth [is Yours]; Yours is the kingdom and [You are He] Who is exalted over everything as the Leader." The book of "greatness" (gedula) on the Sabbath was not preserved, but the book of "power" (gevurah) is Gevurath Hashem, the book of glory (tif'arah) is Tif'ereth Yisrael, and the book of "eternity" or "victory" (netzach) is Netzach Yisrael.

== Sources and further reading ==
- Adlerstein, Y. Be'er Hagolah: The Classic Defense of Rabbinic Judaism Through the Profundity of the Aggadah. New York, NY: Mesorah Publications, 2000. ISBN 1-57819-463-6.
- Mordechai Breuer, "The Maharal of Prague's Disputation with Christians: A Reappraisal of Be'er Ha-Golah" in Tarbiẕ (1986) 253–260.
- Martin Buber, "The Beginning of the National Idea" On Zion: The History of an Idea, (New York, Schocken Books, 1973).
- Eliyahu Yaakov Deutsch, Shabbos Insights Of The Maharal Jerusalem: Targum, 2009.
- Rabbi Edouard Gourévitch : Le Puits de L'Exil, Éditions Berg International, Paris, 1991.
- Rabbi Edouard Gourévitch : Les Hauts Faits de l'Eternel, traduction française, Éditions Cerf, Paris, 1994
- Gross, Benjamin, Yehi Or (Reʾuven Mass, 1995).
- Gross, Benjamin, Netsah Yiśraʾel Tel Aviv: Devir, 1974.
- Aharon Kleinberger, The Educational Theory of the Maharal of Prague [Hebrew] (Magnes: 1962).
- Otto Dov Kulka, "The Historical Background of the National and Educational Teachings of the Maharal of Prague" [Hebrew] Zion 50 (1985) 277–320.
- Andre Neher, Jewish Thought and the Scientific Revolution: David Gans (1541–1613) and his times (Oxford-New York: Littman Library, 1986).
- Neher, Faust et le Maharal de Prague: le Mythe et le Reel (Paris: Presses Universitaires de France, 1987).
- Neher, Le Puits de l'Exil: la Theologie Dialectique du Maharal de Prague (Paris: A. Michel, 1996).
- Neher, Mishnato shel ha-Maharal mi-Prague, Re'uven Mass, c 2003.
- Putik, Alexandr; Polakoviç, Daniel (2009). "Judah Loew ben Bezalel, Called Maharal—A Study on His Genealogy and biography". In Putik, Alexandr (ed.). Path of Life: Rabbi Judah Loew Ben Bezalel: ca. 1525–1609. Academia and Jewish Museum in Prague. pp. 29–83. ISBN 9788020017758.
- Byron L. Sherwin, Mystical Theology and Social Dissent: The Life and Works of Judah Loew of Prague (Fairleigh Dickinson University Press, 1982).
- Shulman, Yaacov Dovid (1992). The Maharal of Prague: the story of Rabbi Yehudah Loew. New York: CIS. ISBN 1-56062-168-0. OCLC 27887477..
- Rivka Schatz Uffenheimer, "Maharal's Conception of Law- Antithesis to Natural Law" Jewish Law Annual Vol. VI.
- Rivka Schatz Uffenheimer, "Existence and Eschatology in the Teachings of the Maharal" Immanuel 14 (Spring 1982) 66–97; Immanuel 15 (Winter 1982–3) 62–72.
- Moshe Zuriel "Numbers: Their meaning and Symbolism According to Maharal" [Hebrew] HaMaayan 18:3 (1978) 14–23; 18:4 (1978) 30–41, reprinted in Sefer Ozrot Gedolei Yisroel (Jerusalem:2000) volume 1, pp. 204–228.
