= Khirbat Qumbaza =

- Etymology: Kumbazah, possibly from Persian for dome or cupola
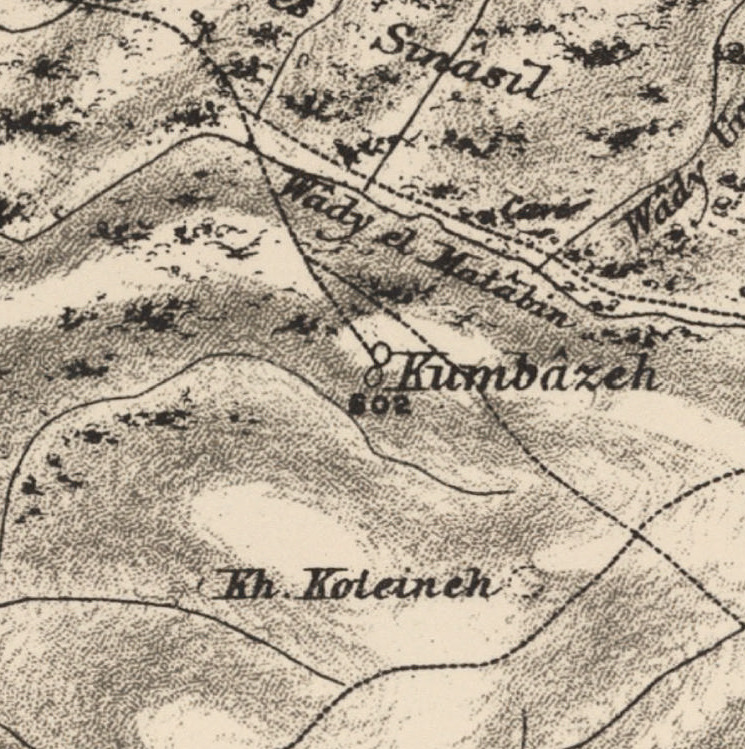
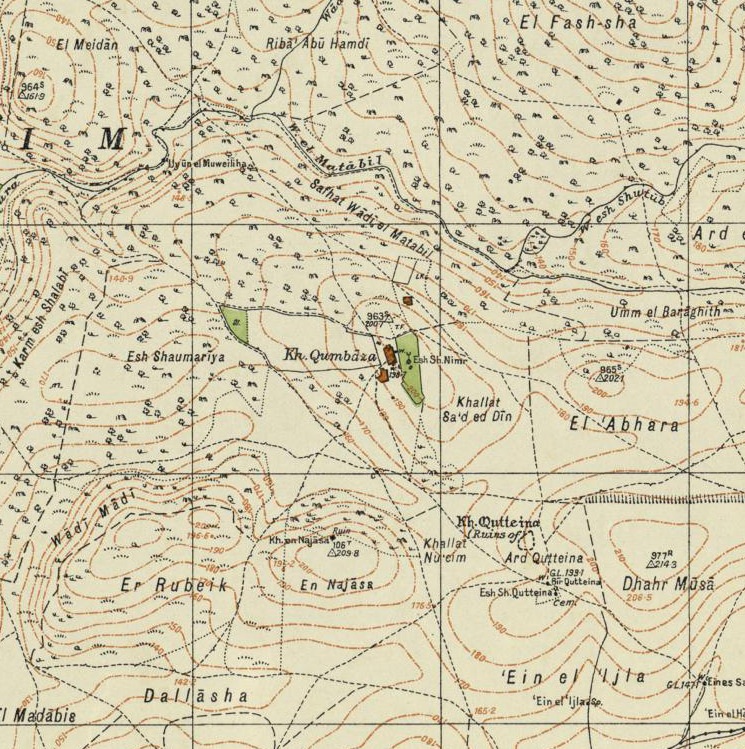
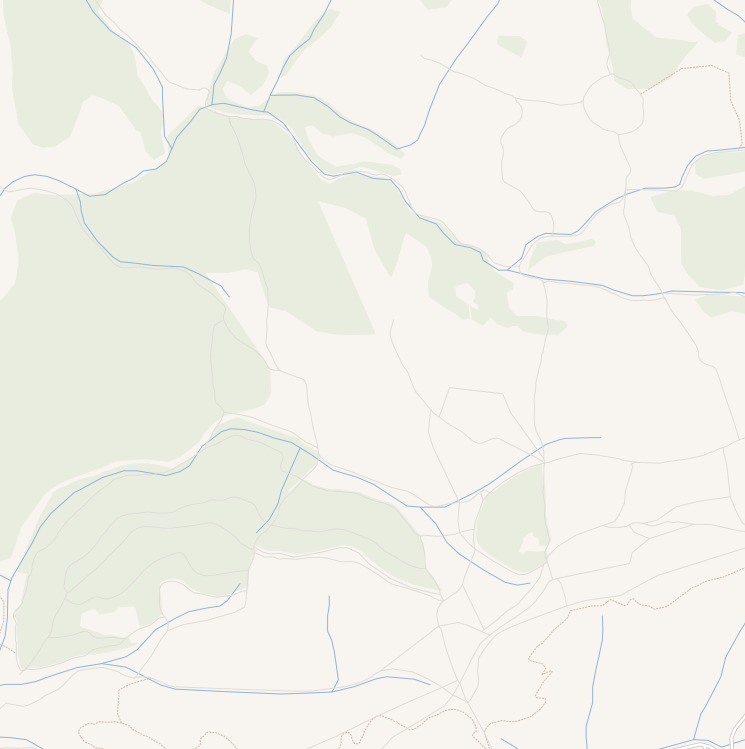
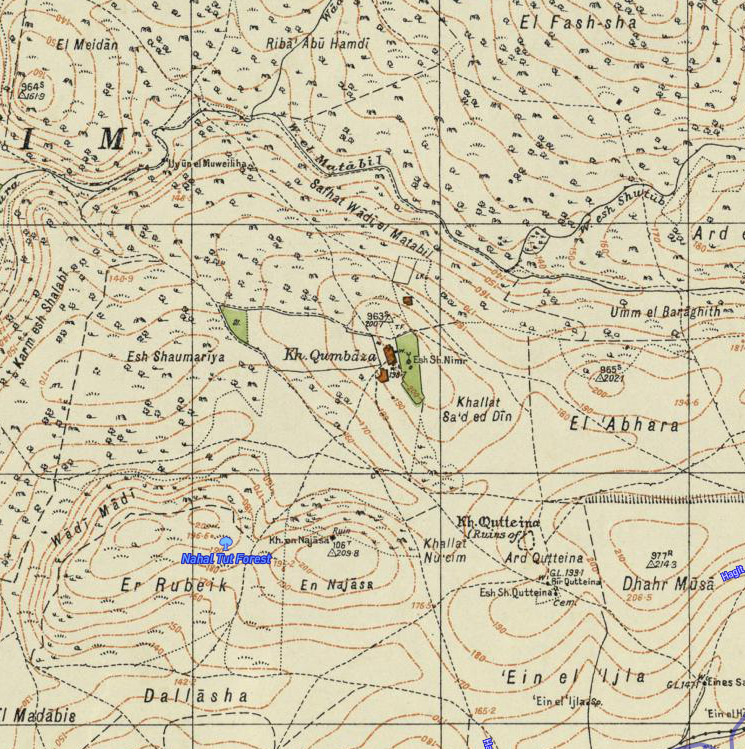
- 1870s map 1940s map modern map 1940s with modern overlay map A series of historical maps of the area around Khirbat Qumbaza (click the buttons)

- Location within Mandatory Palestine
- Coordinates: 32°37′55″N 35°1′34″E
- Palestine grid: 152/226
- Geopolitical entity: Mandatory Palestine
- Subdistrict: Haifa
- Date of depopulation: May 1948

Population (1931)
  - Total: 2,160
- Current Localities: Kerem Maharal

Khirbat Qumbaza was a Palestinian Arab village in the Haifa Subdistrict, located 21.5 km (13.4 mi) south of Haifa, 3 km (1.9 mi) away from Wadi al-Milh. It was depopulated during the 1948 Arab-Israeli War in May 1948.

== History ==
One km (0.62 mi) to the southeast of the village site lay the maqam of Shaykh Quttayna, just below Khirbat Quttayna. Khirbat Quttayna has been identified by some scholars as the Canaanite place Kartah.

In the 1882, the PEF's Survey of Western Palestine described Khirbat Qumbaza as "a small hamlet on high ground".

=== British Mandate era ===
In the 1931 census of Palestine, conducted by the British Mandate authorities, Khirbat Qumbaza was counted with Ijzim, Khirbat Al-Manara, Al-Mazar, Shaykh al-Burayk and al-Washahiyya. Together they had a population of 2160; 88 Christians and the rest Muslim, in a total of 442 houses.

=== 1948 and aftermath ===
In July 1948, the IDF found hundreds of women, children and old people at Ijzim and nearby Khirbat Qumbaza. "More than 100" Arabs were reported killed, and about 100 militiamen were taken prisoners. Following the war the area was incorporated into the State of Israel, and according to Walid Khalidi, writing in 1992, some of the village's land was used by the Israeli army as military training ground, while the moshav of Kerem Maharal was close to the old village site.

== Bibliography ==
- Abel, F.M. (1967) 1938. Geographie de la Palestine. Vol. 2 Geographie Politique (3 ed.). Paris. Cited in Khalidi, 1992.
- Conder, C.R.; Kitchener, H.H. (1882). The Survey of Western Palestine: Memoirs of the Topography, Orography, Hydrography, and Archaeology. Vol. 2. London: Committee of the Palestine Exploration Fund.
- Khalidi, W. (1992). All That Remains: The Palestinian Villages Occupied and Depopulated by Israel in 1948. Washington D.C.: Institute for Palestine Studies. ISBN 0-88728-224-5.
- Mills, E., ed. (1932). Census of Palestine 1931. Population of Villages, Towns and Administrative Areas. Jerusalem: Government of Palestine.
- Morris, B. (2004). The Birth of the Palestinian Refugee Problem Revisited. Cambridge University Press. ISBN 978-0-521-00967-6.
- Palmer, E.H. (1881). The Survey of Western Palestine: Arabic and English Name Lists Collected During the Survey by Lieutenants Conder and Kitchener, R. E. Transliterated and Explained by E.H. Palmer. Committee of the Palestine Exploration Fund.
