= Avigdor Kara =

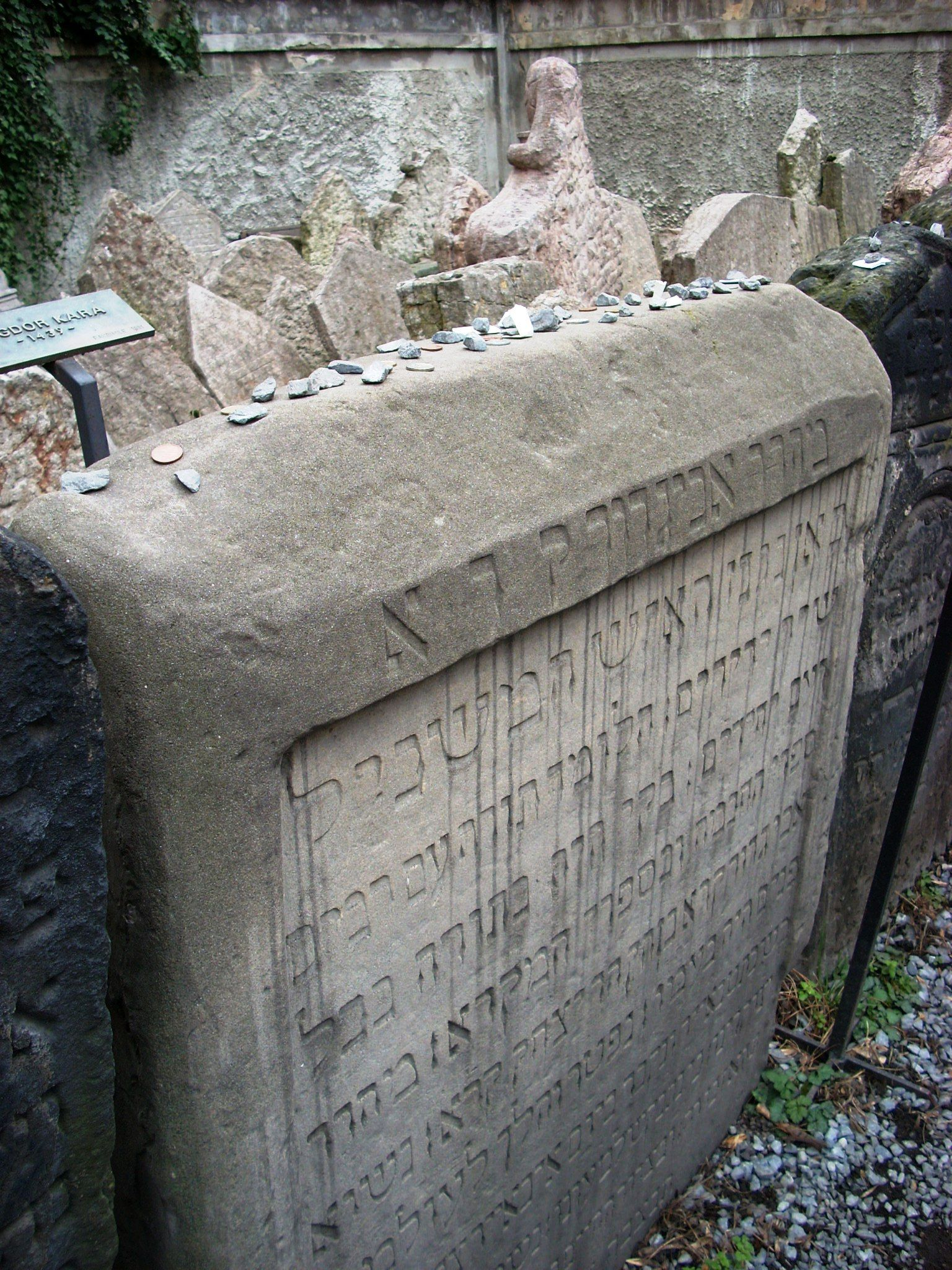
gravestone in Old Jewish Cemetery, Prague

Avigdor ben Isaac Kara was a mystic, poet, philosopher and rabbi from Prague and a forerunner of the Jewish renaissance. He was chief rabbi of the Prague Jewish community and a Kabbalist, and attended audiences with Wenceslaus IV of Bohemia during which they discussed religious matters. He was friends and colleagues with Yom-Tov Lipmann-Muhlhausen and Menahem ben Jacob Shalem. Kara's frequent travels led to the loss of many of his manuscripts. His uncle was said to be Judah Leib the Elder. He led a life of poverty and collections were taken up on his behalf from Jewish communities. He sought financial assistance in the aftermath of the 1389 Easter attack in Prague.

He wrote in both Hebrew and Yiddish. He was a composer of hymns. His most famous poem, entitled Et Kol Hatela'ah Asher Meza'atnu or "All the Hardships that Befell Us" or "All the Trouble That Has Found Us" was an elegy concerning the Easter pogrom that took place in Prague in 1389. He died in 1439 and is buried in the Old Jewish Cemetery, Prague, of which his is the oldest identified grave. The elegy he wrote has become part of mahzors and Yom Kippur services. It was cited by David Gans. He is considered the last Ashkenazi payyetan, or composer of piyyutim or liturgical poems, of which 8 survive.
