= Dewaniya =

Reception area or hall in a Middle Eastern home

The dewaniya or diwaniya was the reception area where a Middle Eastern man received his business colleagues and male guests. Today the term refers both to a reception hall and the gathering held in it, and visiting or hosting a dewaniya is an important feature in the culture of Eastern Arabia.

The word is first attested in Sumerian as dub, found in clay tablet.

It is comparable to the diwan-khane of Persian households, and derives from the word divan, meaning a formal council room in Persian and other regional languages.

Dewaniya became a fundamental part of Kuwaiti life. Hence, it has become a mark in their traditional daily life.

== Origin ==
Dewaniya derives from the Persian divan, which itself is derived from Sumerian dub, in clay tablet, which meant a formal room for sitting and negotiation, and is used to designate a royal court, a high government ministry, or a council of state. The contemporary form has come to mean a well-known place where people, traditionally men only, can meet to discuss political issues and other sociopolitical issues. One well-known Dewan is the Prime Minister of India's Dewan.

Additionally, Dewan is an Arabic term of Persian origin. The original meaning may refer to a "bundle (of written sheets)", hence "book", especially "book of accounts," and hence "office of accounts," "custom house," "council chamber". The meaning divan "long, cushioned seat" is due to such seats having been found along the walls in Middle Eastern council chambers.

== Purposes ==
The Dewaniya served an important purpose in the development of Kuwait over the last 250 years by facilitating quick communication and consensus building among other things. There are many type of Dewaniyas that have evolved from the original archetype and they differ only in terms of the groups they serve and the level of formality.

The Dewaniyas are the core of Kuwait's social, business and political life, the places where topics of interest are discussed, associates introduced, alliances formed, and similar networking activities undertaken. Formal Dewaniyas may be convened to discuss particular topics, sometimes with invited guest speakers. They are also called for particular purposes, such as election campaigns. Formal Dewaniyas are the root of Kuwait's consensual political system.

=== Elections ===
The influence of visiting Dewaniyas by the National Assembly Candidates is very visible. Being a direct communication mean between the Electors (Voters) and the Candidates in all the different districts in Kuwait.

A list of Dewaniyas in the different areas is prepared from day 1 of Elections, and the Candidates schedules appointments to visit the influential Dewaniyas before the Election day trying to maximize their reach in one of the most powerful tools in Elections.

=== Business ===
Many people were wondering how does major deals are closed or initiated in Dewaniya, and why does that happens in Kuwait specifically.

Basically, as Dewaniya being place where prominent people in the Government from Ministers, Chairmen of Public companies, prominent people in Oil sector, to undersecretaries. And Businessmen, Banks chairmen, CEO's of multinational corporations, they all receive their guests weekly or monthly in their family dewan or private dewaniya.

People who visits a decision maker in his dewaniya, it force him by tradition to gently listen and be open to what they say. Which gives a big chance for people who has a good proposal to deliver a proper value proposition in the offering, which then ends up with another formal meeting at the decision maker office to do the formalities. And also considering the place to be the best to build connections.

As a conclusion, Dewaniya is a place where communication is done with a very proper attention from the decision maker.

== Types ==
Dewaniya has several types, private, public and family. The private is just for close friends who usually gather daily and public are fixed with a weekly timing where anyone can visit, while family dewaniya, is an official gathering of prominent family, where all people can come and meet the family members.

=== Family dewan or dewaniya ===
This was the original form of the Dewaniya that started when each family (only a handful in the 18th century) very known as the Family Dewan would set up an extension to their main home to host guests and discuss important issues. This would also be the place that wedding ceremonies and funeral rites would be held for the male side of the family. The elders of the family are usually in attendance and sit at the head of what is usually a U-shaped hall to welcome guests and lead the discussions.

=== Political dewaniya ===
These Dewaniyas are a relatively recent development of the 20th century when Kuwaitis started seeking political rights and more representation in a system that had become more skewed towards an absolutist rule by the Emir in contrast to the more participatory consensual system that existed earlier. It is considered as a public Dewaniya.

=== Casual dewaniya ===
These Dewaniyas are usually organized by groups of friends of the same age group on one member's property. This type is usually the most relaxed with participants playing cards Janjifa like Koutbo6, smoking Shisha (sometimes called the Hookah), watching football games and other sports, or playing video games. It is considered as a private Dewaniya.

== Times ==
Most Dewaniyas start after the sunset till midnight the whole year round and recently it started having a break in summer.

Type	Approximate visitors	Time
Dewan	50–500	After Isha prayer, to 11pm
Family	20–100	After Isha prayer, to 11pm
Political	20–100	After Isha prayer, to 11pm
Casual	10–30	5pm to 11pm
Private	5–20	door is open 24/7
Youth	5–20	door is open 24/7

== Janjifa ==
In Dewaniya, many cards games are played. To mention some of for reference:

Name	Players
Kout	4, 6
Hand	2–5
Sebeita	4–6
Nithala	4
Trix	4
Balot	4

== Business and technology usage ==
Because most Kuwaiti men and youth are tied-up with a Dewaniya, it was a must from large corporations and multinationals to introduce services like Dewaniya SMS from Zain Kuwait. The idea is to keep the Dewaniya members in-touch with each other using the SMS, and keeping everyone up-to-date with the activities going on in the group.

Other companies are packaging its products to be sold for Dewaniyas specially food & beverage companies Because these are a big market that they can tap in by their offers.

The more technology advances, we see Dewaniya members getting in touch with each other by creating a micro version of their Dewaniya on BlackBerry Messenger groups, WhatsApp groups, Beluga, private Facebook groups, and Twitter. To share what needs an instant update for all the Dewaniya members like invitations, or funerals.

== Food and beverages ==
Every Dewaniya has its own offers of Food and Beverages, yet they all commonly offer tea and coffee (Arabian) for its guests. Depending on the occasions, you will find some Dewaniyas offering dinner based on specific occasions (newborn, graduations, new job, Hajj).

=== Coffee and tea ===
You can't find any Dewaniya which do not offer regular tea. Arabian coffee is another important beverage in any Dewaniya. Yet the different types of tea (Green tea, White tea) is an option, depending on the Dewaniya owners wish to serve. In modern Dewaniyas, you would find the luxury of the espresso machines, cappuccino and mocha for more convenience visitors.

=== Dessert ===
Starting from dates (fruit) that you find most Dewaniyas offer, till sweets. Is something that many Dewaniya owners assure to offer for attendees specially for Dewaniyas that open their doors for more than 6 hours a day.

=== Dinner ===
On occasions, or sometimes weekly, you find Dewaniya owners inviting guests for dinner or even for the Dewaniya regular attendees. Dinner in Dewaniya is more popular on occasions like elections, newborn, graduations, new job, or Hajj.

== See also ==
- Divan
- Diwan-khane, a room which serves a similar function in Persian households
- Divan (Mughal architecture) - the dewaniya as used in Mughal architecture
