= Statue of Judah Loew ben Bezalel =

Statue in Prague, Czech Republic

- Socha rabiho Löwa (Czech)
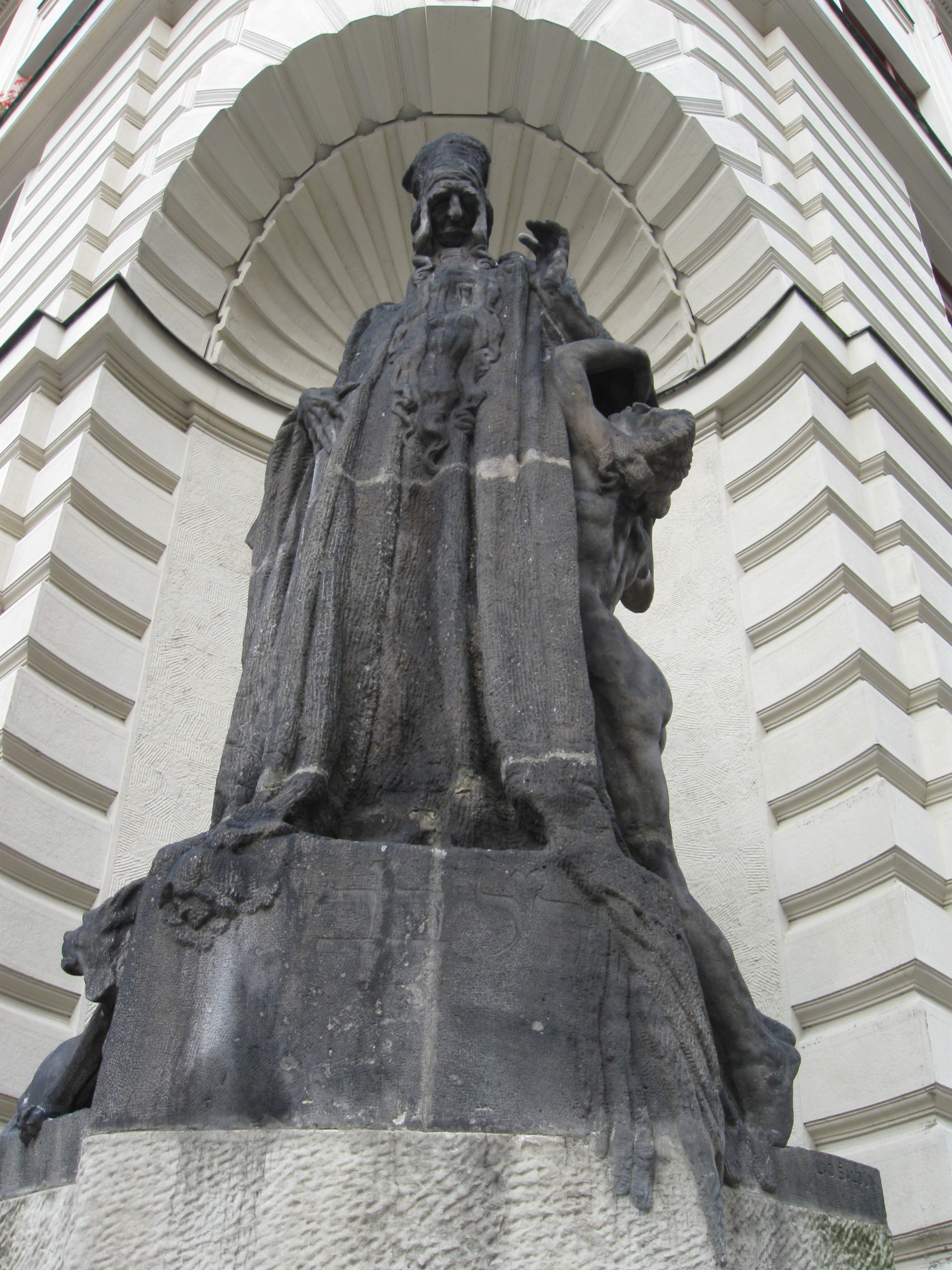
- The statue in 2012
- Type: Sculpture
- Location: Prague, Czech Republic; 50.086954°N 14.417862°E

The statue of Judah Loew ben Bezalel (Czech: Socha rabiho Löwa) is an outdoor sculpture by Ladislav Šaloun, installed at New City Hall in Prague, Czech Republic.

A replica from 1914 by Ladislav Saloun is in the Maisel Synagogue in Prague. The replica has a plaque, which states that the statue’s theme is the Maharal’s death. His death is symbolized by the nude young girl holding out a rose “whose scent brings about his end”. There is a small dog on the statue’s other side, but no description of the meaning of the dog is given.
