= Al-Mazar, Haifa =

Al-Mazar المزار
- Village
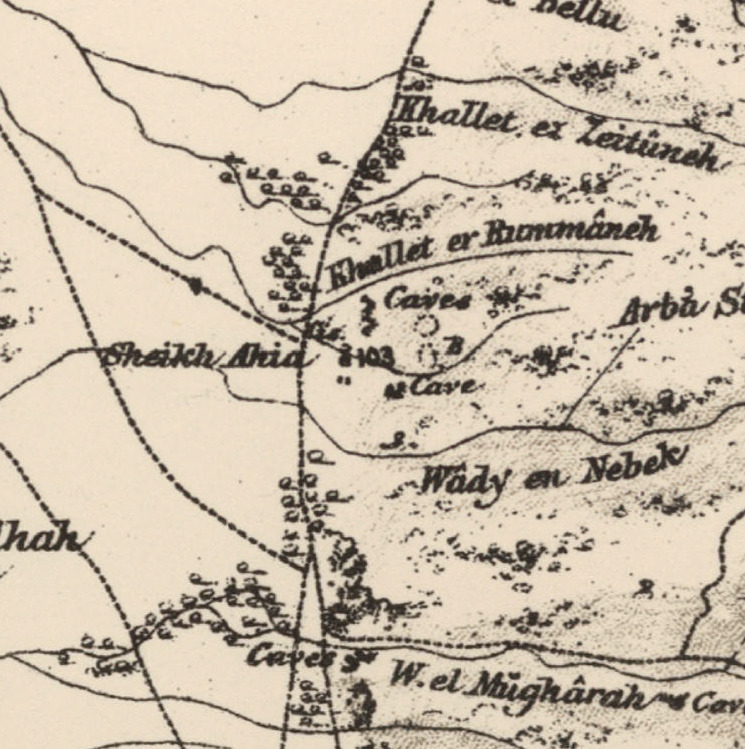
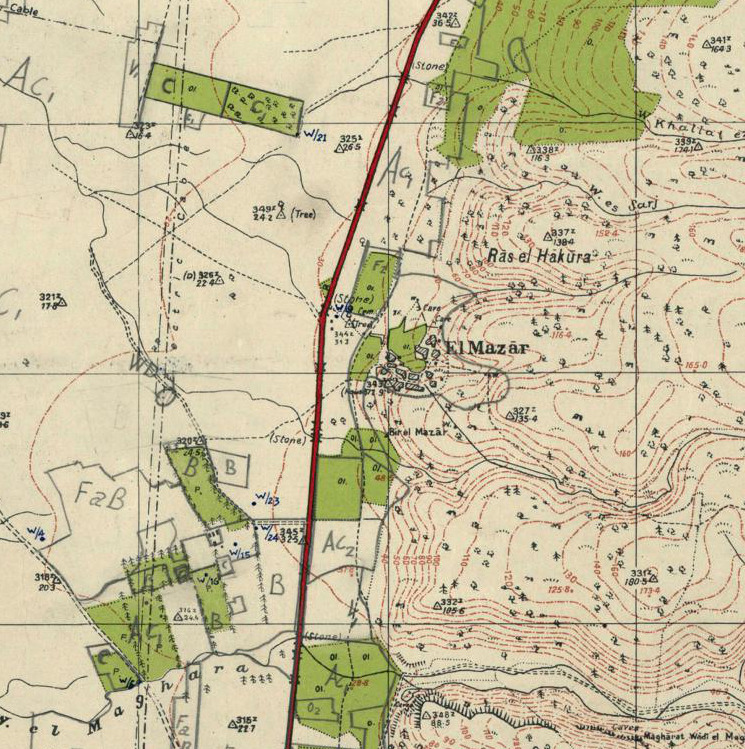
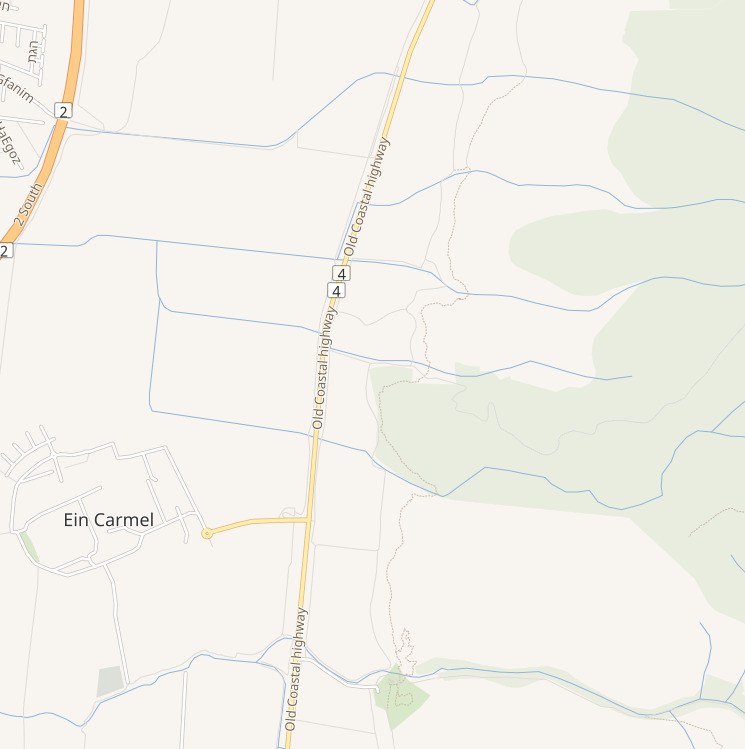
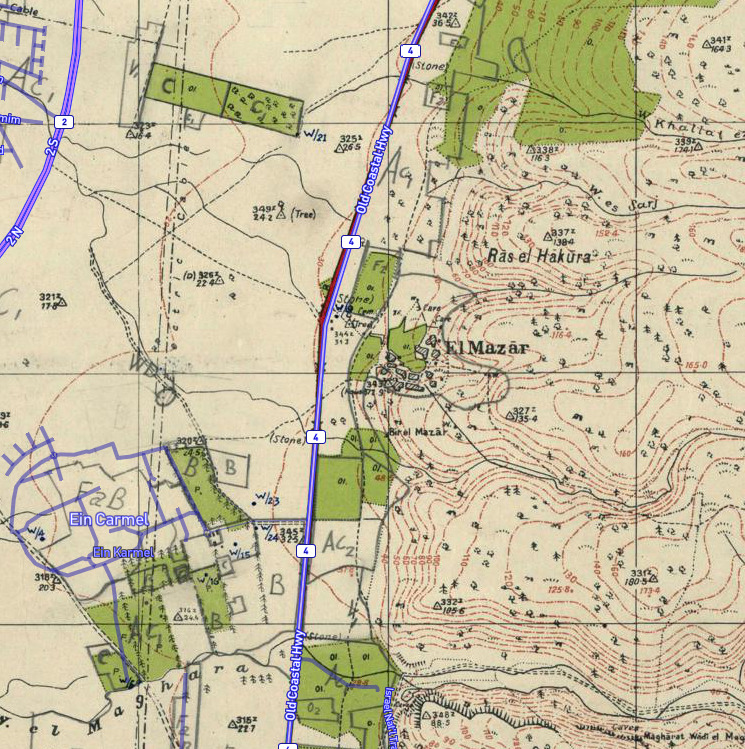
- 1870s map 1940s map modern map 1940s with modern overlay map A series of historical maps of the area around Al-Mazar, Haifa (click the buttons)

- Location within Mandatory Palestine
- Coordinates: 32°40′56″N 34°57′52″E
- Palestine grid: 147/232
- Geopolitical entity: Mandatory Palestine
- Subdistrict: Haifa
- Date of depopulation: July 15, 1948

Population (1945)
  - Total: 210
- Cause(s) of depopulation: Military assault by Yishuv forces
- Current Localities: Ein Carmel

Al-Mazar was a Palestinian Arab village located 4 kilometers (2.5 mi) northeast of al-Sarafand. In 1945, it had a population of 210.

== History ==
The village name Mazar, which is Arabic for "shrine", "a place one visits", was probably meant to commemorate the many people who were killed and buried there in the wars against the Crusaders.

A population list from about 1887 showed that el Mizar had about 85 inhabitants; all Muslims.

=== British Mandate period ===
In the British Mandate of Palestine period, in the 1922 census of Palestine ‘’Al Mazar’’ had a population of 134; all Muslims. In the 1931 census, Al-Mazar was counted together with Khirbat Al-Manara, Ijzim and Qumbaza. The total population was 2,160; 88 Christians, 2,082 Muslims, in a total of 442 houses.

In the 1945 statistics the population was 210, all Muslims with a total of 7,976 dunams of land. Of this, 5 dunams were for citrus and bananas, 473 were plantations or irrigable land, 3,750 were for cereals, while 39 dunams were classified built-up, (urban), land.

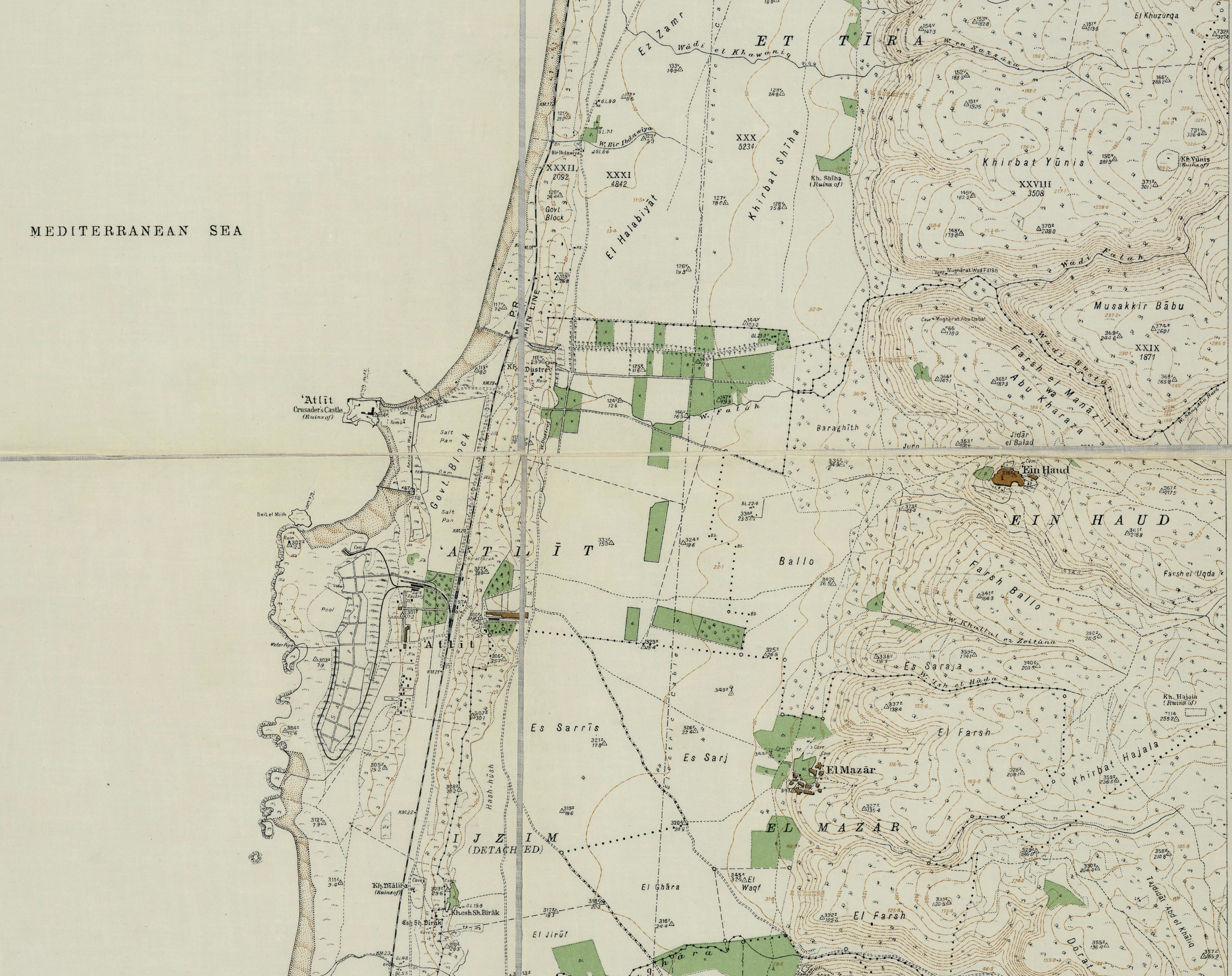
Al-Mazar (El Mazar) 1932 1:20,000

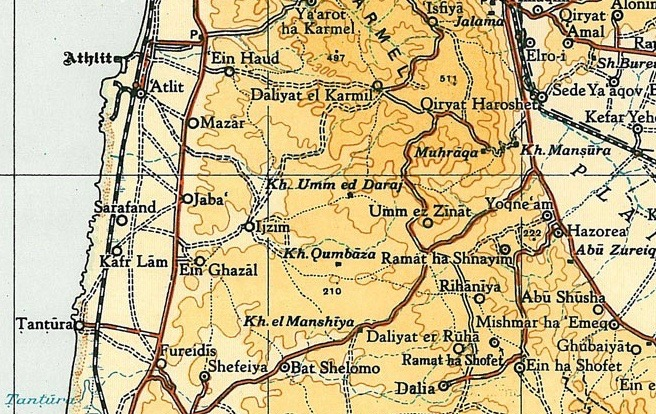
Al-Mazar (Mazar) 1945 1:20,000

=== 1948 and aftermath ===
The village was first raided by the Israel Forces (IDF) on May 17 during the 1948 Arab-Israeli war, with the aim of "rendering [the village] unworthy of use." The IDF encountered only 10-20 Arabs, who ran away, and the troops proceeded to "burn what could be burned." Within days of the IDF's withdrawal, some of the villagers had returned, Arab militants and civilians. The village was permanently depopulated as a result of another IDF military assault in mid-July 1948. Following the war the area was incorporated into the State of Israel and the kibbutz of Ein Carmel was established partially on al-Mazar's land in 1950.

== Shaykh Yahia/Ahya shrine ==
The Maqam (shrine) was located on the lower slopes of a hill. In 1881, E. H. Palmer described the name as possibly coming from St. John of Tyre, who was noted in this direction in 1187. Ahya is also a name for John the Baptist.

The shrine was surveyed by Ronen and Olami in 1964–65. They found a two roomed structure, facing east–west. The eastern room seemed the oldest; it was a domed rectangular room made of kurkar stone, where the surface were coated with plaster containing Byzantine pottery fragments. The western room was built of limestone.

The shrine has now been destroyed, and the area has been converted into orchards.

== Bibliography ==
- Barron, J.B., ed. (1923). Palestine: Report and General Abstracts of the Census of 1922. Government of Palestine.
- Government of Palestine, Department of Statistics (1945). Village Statistics, April, 1945.
- Hadawi, S. (1970). Village Statistics of 1945: A Classification of Land and Area ownership in Palestine. Palestine Liberation Organization Research Center. Archived from the original on 2018-12-08.
- Khalidi, W. (1992). All That Remains: The Palestinian Villages Occupied and Depopulated by Israel in 1948. Washington D.C.: Institute for Palestine Studies. ISBN 0-88728-224-5.
- Mills, E., ed. (1932). Census of Palestine 1931. Population of Villages, Towns and Administrative Areas. Jerusalem: Government of Palestine.
- Morris, B. (2004). The Birth of the Palestinian Refugee Problem Revisited. Cambridge University Press. ISBN 978-0-521-00967-6.
- Palmer, E.H. (1881). The Survey of Western Palestine: Arabic and English Name Lists Collected During the Survey by Lieutenants Conder and Kitchener, R. E. Transliterated and Explained by E.H. Palmer. Committee of the Palestine Exploration Fund.
- Petersen, Andrew (2001). A Gazetteer of Buildings in Muslim Palestine (British Academy Monographs in Archaeology). Vol. 1. Oxford University Press. ISBN 978-0-19-727011-0. Archived from the original on 2021-05-28.
- Ronen, Avraham. Olami, Ya'aqov.(1978): (in Hebrew): Atlit map, Archaeological Survey of Israel. (p. 63-65)
- Schumacher, G. (1888). "Population list of the Liwa of Akka". Quarterly Statement - Palestine Exploration Fund. 20: 169–191.
- Vogüé, de, M. (1860). Les églises de la Terre Sainte.
