= Kerem Maharal =

Kerem Maharal: כֶּרֶם מַהֲרַ״ל (Hebrew)
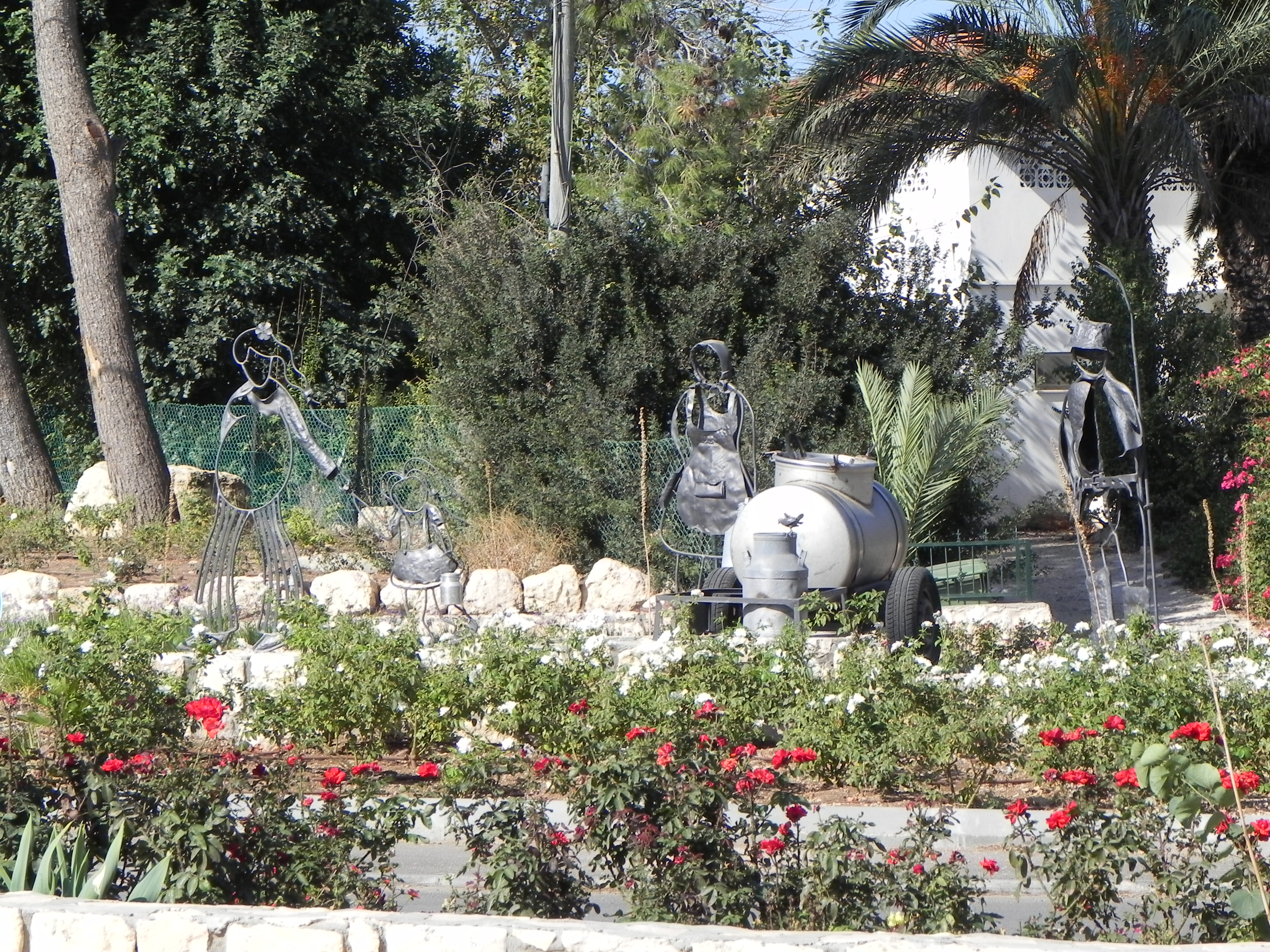

- Location within Haifa region of Israel
- Coordinates: 32°38′57″N 34°59′31″E
- Country: Israel
- District: Haifa
- Subdistrict: Hadera
- Council: Hof HaCarmel
- Affiliation: Moshavim Movement
- Founded: 1949
- Founder: Czechoslovak Jewish immigrants
- Population (2024): 920

Kerem Maharal (Hebrew: כֶּרֶם מַהֲרַ״ל, lit. 'Maharal Vineyard') is a moshav in northern Israel. Located near Atlit, on the southern side of Mount Carmel, it falls under the jurisdiction of Hof HaCarmel Regional Council. In 2024 it had a population of 920.

== History ==
The moshav was established in 1949 by Jewish Holocaust survivors from Czechoslovakia, who had immigrated to Israel with the help of the Aliya movement after World War II.

Kerem Maharal was named after legendary 16th century Rabbi Judah Loew ben Bezalel, also known by the Hebrew acronym "Maharal" (Moreinu HaRav Loew, translated as Our teacher, the Rabbi Loew). It was built on the sites of the depopulated Arab villages of Ijzim and Khirbat Al-Manara, which were captured by the Israel Defense Forces in Operation Shoter during the 1948 Arab–Israeli War. The residents lived in the Arab stone houses until the 1960s and some of the original structures remain today. A hotel in the moshav was previously a diwan or meeting house of Mas'ud al-Madi" of Ijzim, dating from the 18th century.

== Notable residents ==
- Ami Ayalon, former head of Shin Bet.
- Ram Rothberg, former head of the Israel Navy.
- Andrey Makarevich, musician
