= Menahem ben Jacob Shalem =

Menahem ben Jacob Shalem (Menahem Agler, c. 1350 – c. 1420) was a Jewish philosopher, writer and rabbi from Prague who lived during the late 14th and early 15th centuries. An Aristotelian and a follower of Maimonides, he rejected Kabbalah. He may be considered a rationalist philosopher. He was a leader of the Prague circle of scholars that included his friends and colleagues Avigdor Kara and Yom-Tov Lipmann-Muhlhausen, and was a member of the beit din in Prague. He wrote critical glosses on Moses of Narbonne. Unlike Kara, he was not concerned with grammar. It is not clear and is speculated on by scholars whether he was of an Ashkenazic background or arrived from Italy, Spain, or Jerusalem.
