= Judah Leib the Elder =

16th-century Czech rabbi based in Prague

Judah Leib
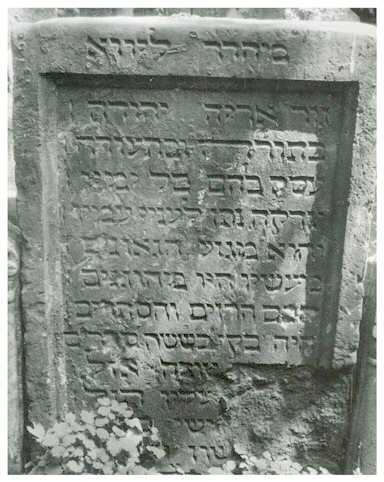
- Grave of Judah Leib the Elder
- Died: 1539 Prague, Czech Republic

Religious life
- Religion: Judaism

Judah Leib the Elder (Hebrew: יהודה לייב הזקן; died 1539) was a 16th-century Czech rabbi based in Prague, who is of great genealogical significance due to his alleged descent from King David.

== Ancestor of Judah Loew ben Bezalel ==
The earliest mention of Judah Leib in rabbinic literature can be found in "Megilat Hayukhsin" (1727) by Meir Perels of Prague, who claimed that Judah Leib the Elder died in 1439 and was the paternal grandfather of Chajim of Worms, who in part was the father of Jakob ben Chajim (died 1574) and the grandfather of Judah Loew ben Bezalel (1526-1609). The 20th-century historian Otto Muneles challenged Perels' earlier claims after discovering the grave of Judah Leib the Elder in the Old Jewish Cemetery of Prague, in which Judah Leib's death is recorded as accruing in 1539. Muneles goes on to state that because both Judah Leib the Elder and his alleged great-great-grandson Judah Loew ben Bezalel share the same personal name, Judah Loew could not have been descended from Judah Leib the Elder because Ashkenazi Jewish naming practice forbids the naming of a child after a living ancestor. Shlomo Englard commented that the most probable reason for Perels death date of 1439 was due to a mistranscription of the grave of Judah Leib the Elder. Judah Leib the Elder is a central figure to Chabad messianism as Menachem Mendel Schneerson was a descendant of Judah Loew ben Bezalel. Because the Jewish Messiah has to be a member of the Davidic line, Chabad rabbis have used Perels claim to prove why Menachem Mendel Schneerson is the Messiah.

== Ancestry of Judah Leib the Elder ==
According to his grave, Judah Leib descended from a prominent Geonic line. Several scholars such as Moshe Yair Weinstok and Yaakov Leib Shapira argued that this Geonic line could be paternally traced back to Yosef, the eldest son of Hai Gaon (939-1038) who was a legitimate descendant of the Davidic Exliarchs. However, Englard is very sceptical of these claims stating "there are those who added (on their own authority) that his [Judah Leib the Elder] lineage goes back to Reb Hai Gaon the son of Sherira Gaon. Great doubt should be cast upon this." Similar dubious genealogical claims have been made relating to the ancestry of Judah Leib the Elder back to Samuel ibn Naghrillah (993-1056), also of the Davidic line. Meir Perles also claims that Judah Leib's sister was the mother of Avigdor Kara who died in 1439. His early 19th-century descendant Arieh Leib Kara claimed that Judah Leib the Elder was descended from the Tannaim.
