= Khirbat Al-Manara =

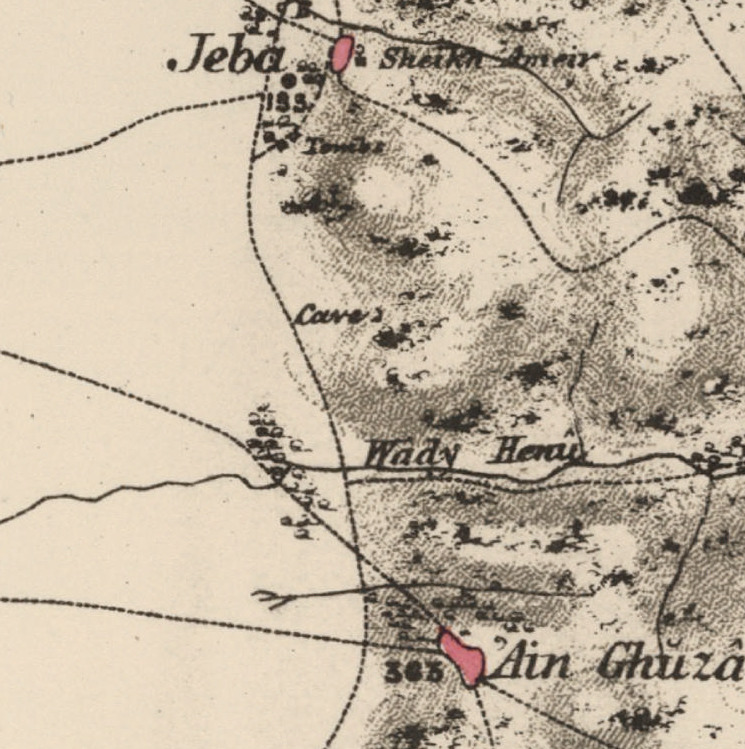
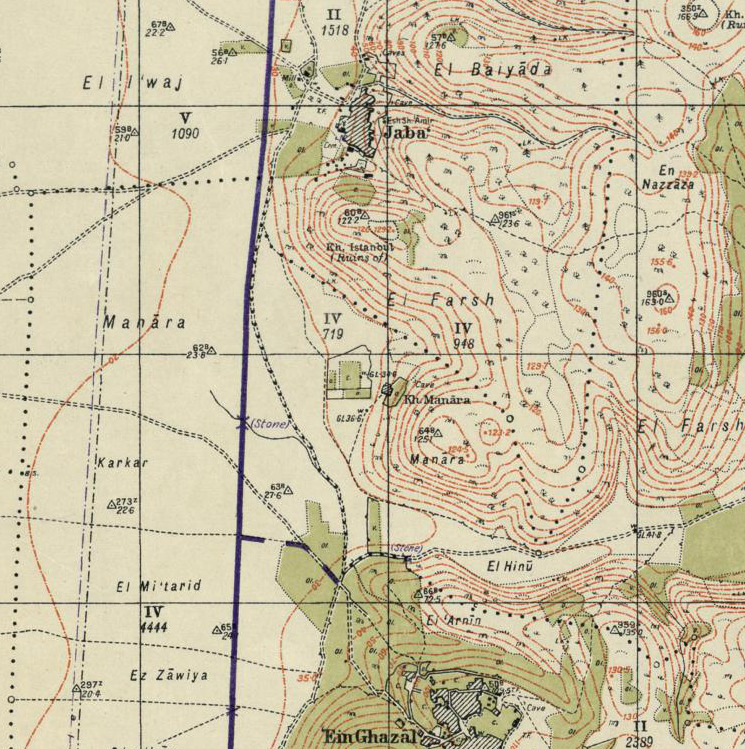
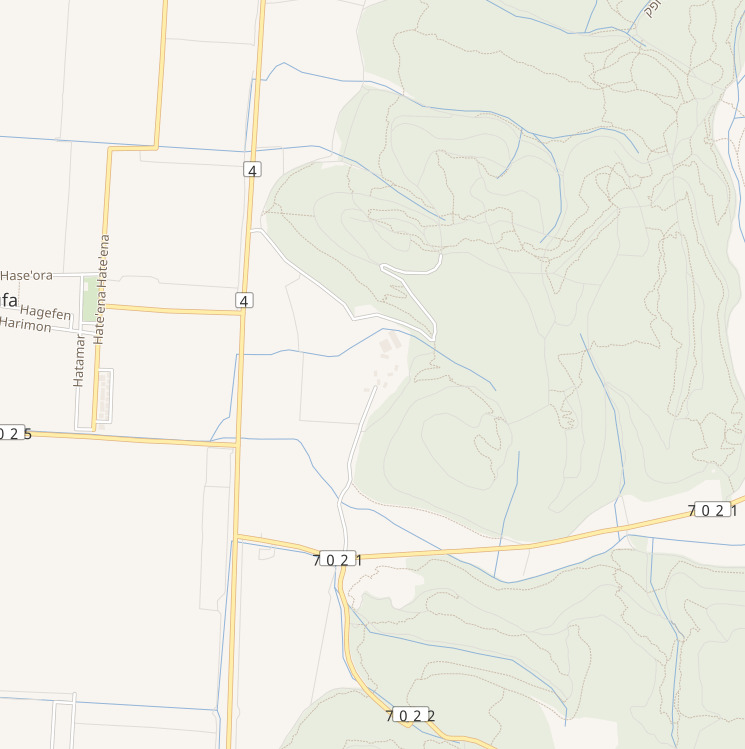
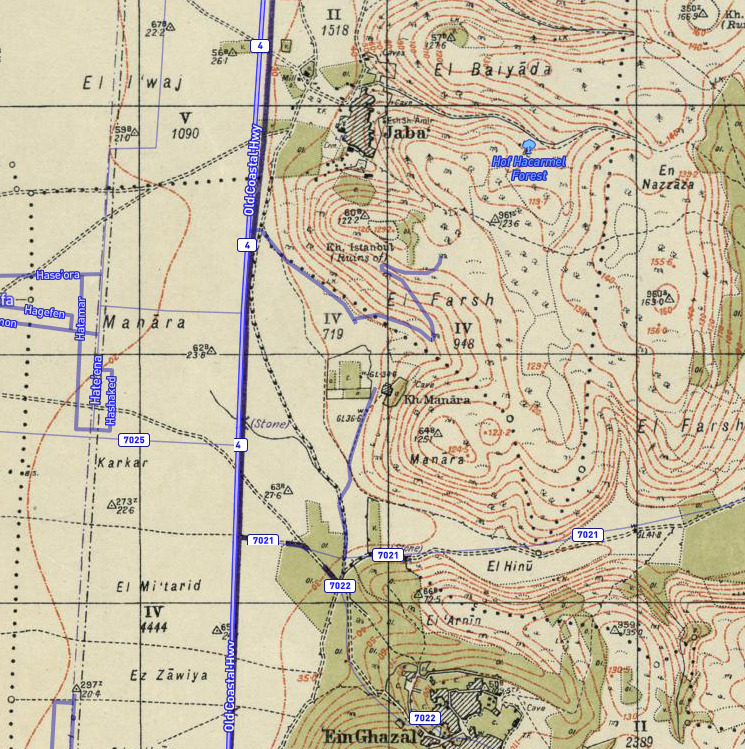
- 1870s map 1940s map modern map 1940s with modern overlay map A series of historical maps of the area around Khirbat Al-Manara (click the buttons)

- Location within Mandatory Palestine
- Coordinates: 32°38′44″N 34°57′52″E
- Palestine grid: 146/227
- Geopolitical entity: Mandatory Palestine
- Subdistrict: Haifa
- Date of depopulation: May 21, 1948
- Current Localities: Ofer Kerem Maharal

Khirbat Al-Manara was a Palestinian Arab village in the Haifa Subdistrict. It was depopulated during the 1948 Arab-Israeli War on May 21, 1948. It was located 19 km south of Haifa.

== History ==
In the 1931 census Khirbat Al-Manara was counted together with Ijzim, Al-Mazar and Qumbaza. The total population was 2160, 88 Christians, 2082 Muslims, in a total of 442 houses.

== Bibliography ==
- Khalidi, W. (1992). All That Remains: The Palestinian Villages Occupied and Depopulated by Israel in 1948. Washington D.C.: Institute for Palestine Studies. ISBN 0-88728-224-5.
- Mills, E., ed. (1932). Census of Palestine 1931. Population of Villages, Towns and Administrative Areas. Jerusalem: Government of Palestine.
- Morris, B. (2004). The Birth of the Palestinian Refugee Problem Revisited. Cambridge University Press. ISBN 978-0-521-00967-6.
