= Yusuf al-Nabhani =

Palestinian Islamic scholar (1849–1932)

- یوسف النبهاني

Personal life
- Born: 1849 Ijzim
- Died: 1932 (aged 82–83) Beirut
- Era: 19th century
- Region: Levant
- Main interest: Sufism
- Notable work(s): Jami' Karamat al-Awliya' (The Collection of the Karamat of the Saints), Shawahid al-Haqq fi al-Istighatha bi-Sayyid al-Khalq (The Proofs of Truth in the Seeking of the Intercession of the Prophet)

Religious life
- Religion: Islam
- Denomination: Sunni
- Jurisprudence: Shafi'i
- Tariqa: Qadiriyya, Rifa'iyya, Shadhiliyya, Naqshbandiyya, Khalwatiyya, Idrisiyya
- Creed: Ash'ari

Muslim leader
- Influenced by: Al-Busiri, Muhammad al-Jazuli, Ahmad Zayni Dahlan, Mustafa ibn Kamal al-Din al-Bakri
- Influenced: 'Abd al-Maqsud Muhammad Salim, Taqiuddin al-Nabhani

Yusuf bin Ismail bin Yusuf bin Ismail bin Muhammad Nâsir al-Dîn an-Nabhani (1849–1932) was a Palestinian Sunni Islamic scholar, chief judge, prolific poet, and defender of the Ottoman Caliphate.

== Biography ==
Many of Yusuf al-Nabahani's poems, books, and teachings have remained, but very little is printed about his personal life and activities.

He worked and campaigned against the Wahhabi movement and the reformers in Cairo like Muhammad Abduh and Jamal ad-Din al-Afghani who were changing Sunni Islam. He believed in the law, or Shariah in restricting all Sufi activity, being of the Shafi'i madhab of Sunni Islam holding a similar stance to al-Ghazali in his later years on Sufism.

His father Ismail al-Nabhani taught him to memorise the Quran at a young age, taught him the sciences of Islamic jurisprudence and then sent him to begin study at the university of al-Azhar Cairo on 16 May 1866 at the age of 17. Yusuf graduated from al-Azhar in October 1872 at the age of 23 with qualifications from the official cirriculem of al-Azhar and many other qualifications obtained from extra study under multiple Islamic scholars in many of the sciences of the Shariah and its preparatory disciplines.

After he graduated and returned home to Ijzim, he began to hold a number of religious courses in `Akka and his home town of Ijzim. He travelled frequently to Beirut, then Damascus where he met eminent Ulema or Islamic Scholars. Chief among them was the Chief Jurist of Damascus at the time, Mahmud Effendi Hamza with whom he studied the beginning of Sahih al-Bukhari, after which he gave Yusuf a general certificate Ijaza comprising the rest of the Hadith Collections.

Then he headed for Istanbul the capital of the Ottoman Caliphate twice and worked there for several years. He edited the periodical al-Jawâ'ib until it folded. He also proofread the Arabic books that came out of its press. He left the publishers for a new position with the Ottoman Caliphate's government as a judge or Qadi.

He left Istanbul, the first time, for Iraq, to the province of Mosul, then returned to Istanbul. He left a second time in 1300 Hijri when he was appointed Chief Justice of the al-Jaza court in Latakia on the Syro-Palestinian sea-shore. After living there for five years the Ottoman government transferred him to be the Grand Mufti, or Chief Justice of al-Quds or Jerusalem. Then he moved to be Chief Justice of Beirut in 1888, although some records point to 1887.

The son of his daughter, Taqiuddin al-Nabhani, was sent by Yusuf to Yusuf's Islamic colleagues and teachers in Cairo at the al-Azhar university. Taqiuddin later went on to establish the Islamic political group Hizb ut-Tahrir.

== His teachers ==
- Shaykh Shams al-Dîn Muhammad al-Anbabi al-Shafi the grand Professor and Imam (chief) of al-Azhar, who died in 1313 Hijra Calendar.
- Shaykh `Abd al-Rah.mân al-Sharbînî al-Shafi the Imam of al-Azhar, who died in 1326 Hijra Calendar.
- Shaykh Ibrâhîm al-Saqqâ al-Shafi who died in 1298 Hijra Calendar aged around ninety years.
- Shaykh al-Sayyid Muh.ammad al-Damanhûrî al-Shafi
- Shaykh `Abd al-Qâdir al-Râfi`î al-Hanafi al-Tarabulsî the head professor of the Damascenes' Porch (Ruwâq al-Shawâmm) in al-Azhar, who died in 1323 Hijra Calendar.
- Shaykh Yûsuf al-Barqâwî al-Hanbali the head Professor of the Hanbalîs' Porch in al-Azhar Mosque
- Shaykh Ibrâhîm al-Zurrû al-Khalîlî al-Shafi who died in 1287 Hijra Calendar, aged around seventy.
- Shaykh Ah.mad al-Ajhûrî al-D.arîr al-Shafi who died in 1293 Hijra Calendar, aged around sixty.
- Shaykh H.asan al-`Adawî al-Maliki who died in 1298 Hijra Calendar aged around eighty.
- Shaykh al-Sayyid `Abd al-Hâdî Najâ al-Abyârî who died in 1305 Hijra Calendar, aged just over seventy years.

In addition he named a number of other teachers in his books "Hâdî al-Murîd" and "Jâmi` Karâmât al-Awliyâ".

== Books and writings ==
- Hadi al-Murid ila Tariq al-Asanid
- Jâmi` Karamat al-Awliya
- Khulasat-al-Kalam fi Tarjih Din al-Islam
- Hujjat-Allahi ala al-Alamin fi Mu'jizat Sayyid al-Mursalin (salla'l-Lahu 'alayhi wa sallam)
- Sa'adat al-Darayn fi al-Salat 'ala Sayyid al-Kawnayn (salla'l-Lahu 'alayhi wa sallam)
- Wasa'il al-Wusul ila Shama'il al-Rasul (salla'l-Lahu 'alayhi wa sallam)
- Riyadh al-Jannah fi Adhkar al-Kitab wa-al-Sunnah
- Anwar al-Muhammadiyah (Mukhtasar al-Mawahib al-Ladunyah)
- Fada'il al-Muhammadiyah
- Afdhal Al-Salawat 'ala Sayyidi As-Saadaat (salla'l-Lahu 'alayhi wa sallam)
- Muntakhab al-Sahihayn (consisting of some 3010 ahadith. He also supplemented it an edited version of it entitled Qurrat al-'Ayn 'ala Muntakhab al-Sahihayn.
- Al-Fath al-Kabir fi Damm al-Ziyadah ila Jami' al-Saghir – a combination of two works: al-Jami' al-Saghir of al-Suyuti with his own supplement on it entitled: Ziyadat al-Jami' al-Saghir. In this book the author has included some 14450 ahadith.
- Al-Basha'ir al-Imaniyyah fi al-Mubashshirat al-Manamiyyah
- Al-Nazm al-Badi' fi Mawlid al-Shafi' (salla'l-Lahu 'alayhi wa sallam)
- Al-Hamzat al-Alfiyyah (Tibat al-Gharra') fi Madh Sayyid al-Anbiya' (salla'l-Lahu 'alayhi wa sallam)
- Shawahid al-Haqq fi al-Istighathah bi al-Sayyid al-Khalq (salla'l-Lahu 'alayhi wa sallam)
- Al-Asalib al-Badi'ah fi Fadl al-Sahabah wa-Iqna' al-Shi'ah
- Qasidat al-Sa'adat al-Ma'ad fi Mawazinat Banat al-Sa'ad
- Mithal Na'lihi al-Sharif (salla'l-Lahu 'alayhi wa sallam)
- Al-Sabiqat al-Jiyad fi Madh Sayyid al-'Ibad (salla'l-Lahu 'alayhi wa sallam)
- Al-Fada'il al-Muhammadiyyah
- Al-Wird al-Shafi
- Al-Mazdujah al-Gharra' fi al-Istighathah bi-asma' Allah al-Husna
- Al-Majmu'ah al-Nabhaniyyah fi al-Mada'ih al-Nabawiyyah wa-Asma' Rijaliha
- Nujum al-Muhtadin fi Mu'jizatihi (salla'l-Lahu 'alayhi wa sallam)wa-al-Radd 'ala A'da'ihi Ikhwan al-Shayatin
- Irshad al-Hayara fi Tahdhir al-Muslimin min Madaris al-Nasara
- Jami' al-Thana' 'ala Allah
- Mufarrih al-Kurub wa-Mufarrih al-Qulub
- Hizb al-Istighathat bi-al-Sayyid al-Sadat (salla'l-Lahu 'alayhi wa sallam)
- Ahsan al-Wasa'il fi Nazm Asma' al-Nabi al-Kamil (salla'l-Lahu 'alayhi wa sallam)
- Al-Asma fi-ma li-Sayyidina Muhammadin (salla'l-Lahu 'alayhi wa sallam)min al-Asma'
- Al-Burhan al-Musaddid fi Ithbat Nubuwwat Sayyidina Muhammad (salla'l-Lahu 'alayhi wa sallam)
- Dalil al-Tujjar ila Akhlaq al-Akhyar
- Al-Rahmat al-Muhdat fi Fadl al-Salat
- Husn al-Shur'ah fi Mashru'iyyat Salat al-Zuhr Ba'd al-Jumu'ah
- Risalat al-Tahdhir min Ittikhadh al-Suwar wa-al-Taswir
- Tanbih al-Afkar li-Hikmati Iqbal al-Dunya 'ala al-Kuffar
- Sabil al-Najat fi al-Hubb fi Allah wa-al-Bughd fi Allah
- Raf' al-Ishtibah fi Istihalat al-Jihhat 'ala Allah
- Sa'adat al-Anam fi Ittiba' Din al-Islam
- Mukhtasar Irshad al-Hiyari
- Al-Ra'iyyat al-Sughra fi Dhamm al-Bid'ah (al-Wahabiyyah) wa-Madh al-Sunnat al-Gharra'
- Jawahir al-Bihar fi Fada'il al-Nabi (salla'l-Lahu 'alayhi wa sallam)
- Tahdhib al-Nufus fi tartib al-Durus
- Ittihaf al-Muslim bi-ma Dhakarahu Sahib al-Targhib wa-al-Tarhib min Ahadith al-Bukhari wa-Muslim
- Diwan al-Mada'ih al-Musamma al-'Uqud al-Lu'lu'iyyah fi al-Mada'ih al-Nabawiyyah
- Al-Arba'in Arba'in min Ahadith Sayyid al-Mursalin (salla'l-Lahu 'alayhi wa sallam)
- Al-Dalalat al-Wadihat (Sharh Dala'il al-Khayrat)
- Al-Mubashshirat al-Manamiyyah
- Salawat al-Thana' 'ala Sayyid al-Anbiya' (salla'l-Lahu 'alayhi wa sallam)
- Al-Qawl al-Haqq fi Madh Sayyid al-Khalq (salla'l-Lahu 'alayhi wa sallam)
- Al-Salawat al-Alfiyyah fi al-Kamalat al-Muhammadiyyah
- Al-Istighathat al-Kubra bi-Asma' Allah al-Husna
- Jami' al-salawat 'ala Sayyid al-Sadat (salla'l-Lahu 'alayhi wa sallam)
- Al-Sharaf al-Mu'abbad li-Al Muhammad (salla'l-Lahu 'alayhi wa sallam)
- Salawat al-Akhyar 'ala al-Nabi al-Mukhtar (salla'l-Lahu 'alayhi wa sallam)
- Tafsir Qurrat al-'Ayn min al-Baydawi wa-al-Jalalayn
- Al-Ahadith al-Arba'in fi Ujub Ta'at Amir al-Mu'minin
- Al-Ahadith al-Arba'in fi Fada'il Sayyid al-Mursalin (salla'l-Lahu 'alayhi wa sallam)
- Al-Ahadith al-Arba'in fi Amthal Afsah al-'Alamin (salla'l-Lahu 'alayhi wa sallam)
- Arba'un Hadithan fi fada'il Ahl al-Bayt
- Arba'un Hadithan fi Fadl Arba'in Sahabiyyan
- Arba'un Hadithan fi Arba'in Sighatan fi al-Salat 'ala al-Nabi (salla'l-Lahu 'alayhi wa sallam)
- Arba'un Hadithan fi Fadl Abi Bakr
- Arba'un Hadithan fi Fadl 'Umar
- Arba'un Hadithan fi Fadl Abi Bakr wa-'Umar
- Arba'un Hadithan fi Fadl 'Uthman
- Arba'un Hadithan fi Fadl 'Ali
- Arba'un Hadithan fi Fadl La 'ilaha illa Allah
- Al-Ahadith al-Arba'in fi Fadl al-Jihad wa-al-Mujahidin
- Asbab al-Ta'lif min al-'Ajiz wa-al-Da'if
- Al-Qasidat al-Ra'iyyat al-Kubra
- Al-Siham al-Sa'ibah li Ashab al-Da'awa al-Kadhibah
- Al-Salawat al-Arba'in li Awliya' al-Arba'in
- Al-Khulasat al-Wafiyyah fi Rijal al-Majmu'ah al-Nabhaniyyah
- Ghazawat al-Rasul (salla'l-Lahu 'alayhi wa sallam)
- Khulasat al-Bayan fi Ba'd Ma'athar Mawlana al-Sultan 'Abd al-Hamid al-Thani wa-Ajdaduhu Al-'Uthma

== See also ==
- List of Sufis
- List of Ash'aris and Maturidis
- List of Muslim theologians
