= Rivka Schatz Uffenheimer =

Israeli scholar of Jewish mysticism (1927–1992)

Rivka Schatz Uffenheimer (17 May 1927 - 22 February 1992) was a Jewish scholar of Jewish mysticism. Schatz Uffenheimer was a student of Gershom Scholem.

== Biography ==
Rivka Schatz-Uffenheimer was born in Poland and raised in Brazil. She received her BA, MA, and Ph.D. at the Hebrew University in Jerusalem where she was later employed as a professor of Jewish mysticism. Her main research was in the realm of Hasidism, particularly regarding the Maggid Rabbi Dov Ber of Mezeritch' and his students. She also wrote about Rabbi Abraham Isaac Kook, and many other figures in modern Jewish Mysticism. She and her students collected hundreds of copies of manuscripts of the Zohar in order to prepare a multi-volume critical edition, but due to her premature death, the project was never actualized. After her death much of her library, including the Zohar manuscript copies, and copies of manuscripts of Rabbi Kook, became part of the Gershom Scholem Collection at the National Library of Israel.

== Publications ==
=== Books ===
- Hasidism as mysticism, Quietistic elements in eighteenth century Hasidic thought, Princeton, N.J.: Princeton University Press; Jerusalem: Magnes Press, 1993.
- מגיד דבריו ליעקב, למגיד דב בער ממזריטש, מהדורה ביקורתית על פי כתבי-יד עם מבוא, פירוש, הערות ומפתחות, ירושלים: הוצאת ספרים ע"ש י"ל מאגנס, תשל"ו-1976 (מהדורה שנייה מורחבת ומתוקנת: תש"ן-1990).

=== Other ===
- Schatz-Uffenheimer, R. (1987). Maharal's Conception of Law: Antithesis to Natural Law Theory. The Jewish Law Annual, 6, 109–125.
- Schatz-Uffenheimer, Rivka. "Self-redemption in Hasidic thought." In Types of Redemption. Contributions to the Theme of the Study-Conference Held at Jerusalem 14 to 19 July 1968, pp. 207–212. Brill, 1970.
- Schatz-Uffenheimer, R. (1985). Confession on the Brink of the Crematoria. The Jerusalem Quarterly, 34, 126–41.
- Schatz-Uffenheimer, R. (1963). Die Stellung des Menschen zu Gott und Welt in Bubers Darstellung des Chassidismus. Martin Buber, 275–302.

== See also ==
- Rachel Elior
