= Jakob ben Chajim =

Jakob ben Chajim (died 1574) was a rabbi in Worms, and appointed by Emperor Ferdinand I as Reichsrabbiner (Rabbi of the Empire) of the Holy Roman Empire in 1559. He was the uncle of Judah Loew ben Bezalel and the alleged great-grandson of Judah Leib the Elder.
