= Diwan-khane =

Divan-khane (Persian: دیوان‌خانه) is a Persian phrase from (divan = court) + (khane = house) to describe a guest house or room. It is akin to the great hall of medieval Europe.

In tribal Middle Eastern, Arab, Persian, and Kurdish societies, a guest house of the tribal chieftain is used mostly for discussing tribal affairs. This served as an institution dedicated to the political and social affairs of the tribe. A diwan or diwan-khane was a special room, or house, dedicated to the agha and his male guests, for sitting and drinking tea, discussing the political and social affairs of the tribe and other mundane subjects.

The agha and his guests would also listen to singers and storytellers (usually Jewish merchants or peddlers), who entertained them. The common agha was in charge of several major tasks of the tribal society under his jurisdiction: He was the head of the political unit, the judge and arbitrator, the military leader and the finance minister responsible mainly for receiving dues/taxes from his subjects for their harvest and commercial transactions under his jurisdiction.

== See also ==
- Divan
- Dewaniya, a room which serves a similar function in Eastern Arabia
- Divan (Mughal architecture) - the diwan-khane as used in Mughal architecture
