= Shivaji Sondhi =

Indian-born theoretical physicist

Shivaji L. Sondhi FRS
- Born: Delhi, India
- Citizenship: American
- Education: Hindu College, Delhi; Delhi University; University of California, Los Angeles
- Father: Manohar Lal Sondhi
- Awards: Alfred P. Sloan Fellowship; William L. McMillan Award; David and Lucile Packard Fellowship; EPS Europhysics Prize; Humboldt Research Award; Leverhulme International Professorship
- Scientific career
- Fields: Condensed matter physics
- Workplaces: University of Oxford; New College, Oxford; Princeton University
- Doctoral advisor: Steven Kivelson
- Doctoral students: Vedika Khemani

Shivaji Lal Sondhi FRS is an Indian-American theoretical physicist who is currently the Wykeham Professor of Physics in the Rudolf Peierls Centre for Theoretical Physics at the University of Oxford, known for contributions to the field of quantum condensed matter. He is son of former Lok Sabha MP Manohar Lal Sondhi.

== Early life and career ==
Sondhi was brought up in Delhi, India, where he was educated through high school at Sardar Patel Vidyalaya. He received a B.Sc. in physics from Hindu College, University of Delhi in 1984. He enrolled in the doctoral program in physics at the State University of New York at Stony Brook and began working under the supervision of Steven Kivelson. Around 1988–89, Sondhi moved with his advisor to the University of California, Los Angeles, where he received his PhD in 1992.

He spent three years as a postdoctoral researcher at the University of Illinois, Urbana-Champaign (formally under the joint supervision of Gordon Baym, Eduardo Fradkin, Paul Goldbart, and Michael Stone at what is now the Institute for Condensed Matter Theory), before taking up an assistant professorship at Princeton in 1995. At Princeton, Sondhi was promoted to associate professor in 2001, and to professor of physics in 2005. He served as a Senior Fellow of the Princeton Center for Theoretical Science (which he co-founded) from 2006–08. Sondhi remained at Princeton until 2021, when he was appointed to the Wykeham Professorship at the University of Oxford, succeeding David Sherrington.

== Research ==
Sondhi has worked extensively across a wide range of topics in theoretical condensed matter physics, notably in the areas of topological phases of matter, strongly correlated electrons, and quantum magnetism. His recent research activity focuses on the study of many-body quantum dynamics. Sondhi's most significant contributions include the discovery of skyrmions in the quantum Hall effect (with A. Karlhede, S. Kivelson and E. Rezayi), the identification of a resonating valence bond liquid phase in the triangular lattice quantum dimer model (with R. Moessner), the theoretical prediction of magnetic monopoles in spin ice (with C. Castelnovo and R. Moessner), and for proposing the $\pi$-spin glass/time crystal state of periodically driven (Floquet) systems (with V. Khemani, A. Lazarides and R. Moessner).

== Awards and honors ==
Sondhi was elected a Fellow of the Royal Society (FRS) in 2025.

In 1996, Sondhi was awarded the William L. McMillan Award in condensed matter physics from the University of Illinois. He is a recipient of both the Alfred P. Sloan Fellowship (1996) and of a David and Lucile Packard Fellowship (1998), and was elected a Fellow of the American Physical Society in 2008. He also received a Humboldt Research Award from the Alexander von Humboldt Foundation in 2015. Sondhi was awarded a 2020 Leverhulme International Professorship to be held at the University of Oxford. He was elected a Fellow of the Royal Society in 2025.

In 2012, Sondhi shared the EPS Europhysics Prize with Steven T. Bramwell, Claudio Castelnovo, Santiago Grigera, Roderich Moessner, and Alan Tennant, for the prediction and experimental observation of magnetic monopoles in spin ice.

== Other activities ==
Sondhi also directed a program on India and the World at the Center for International Security Studies at the Woodrow Wilson School of Princeton University. Previously, he co-founded and co-directed a program on Oil, Energy and the Middle East at Princeton.
