= Assa Auerbach =

- אסא אוירבך
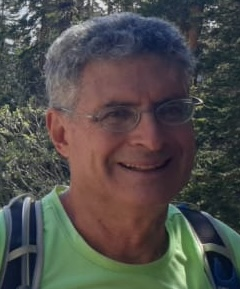
- Born: January 10, 1956
- Died: February 4, 2025 (aged 69)
- Awards: Fellow of the Israeli Physical Society
- Scientific career
- Fields: Condensed matter physics
- Academic advisors: Steven Kivelson; Kathryn Levin

Assa Auerbach (January 10, 1956 – February 4, 2025) was an Israeli theoretical physicist who served as a Professor in the physics faculty at the Technion. He is known for his contributions to condensed matter physics, in particular to the study of strongly correlated materials and quantum magnetism.

== Biography ==
Assa Auerbach was born in the Ma'agan Michael kibbutz. His father, Israel Auerbach, was a sea captain, and was a member of the Palyam. His mother, Ruth, was a musician and viola player. The family moved to Haifa when Auerbach was 3 years old.

Auerbach served in the IDF armored corps. He then worked as a wireless operator on merchant ships. He studied for a bachelor's degree in physics and mathematics at the Hebrew University of Jerusalem, graduating in 1979. He then pursued a master's degree in physics at the Weizmann Institute of Science under the supervision of Prof. Zeev Vager. In 1981, he went to the United States and began doctoral studies at the State University of New York at Stony Brook under the supervision of Steven Kivelson. His Ph.D. dissertation, submitted in 1985, was titled "The Path Decomposition Expansion and Multidimensional Tunneling."

From 1985 to 1988, he was a postdoctoral researcher at the University of Chicago and later at Brookhaven National Laboratory in New York. Following that, he served as an Assistant Professor in the Department of Physics at Boston University. Upon his return to Israel in 1990, he joined the faculty of physics at the Technion as a faculty member, while continuing to hold his position in Boston until 1993. In 1995, he was appointed Associate Professor, and in 2000, Full Professor.

From 2016 to 2018, he served as Dean of the Faculty of Physics at the Technion. Over the years, he has been a visiting professor at Stanford University and Harvard University. Auerbach served as a scientific general member of the Aspen Center for Physics from 2006 to 2016.

=== Research ===
Auerbach studied the physics of strongly correlated quantum systems and was among the first to engage in this field of research in Israel. He developed quantum field theory methods for spin systems and applied these approaches to solve problems in complex materials such as high-temperature superconductors and Kondo lattice systems. With his postdoctoral advisor, Kathryn Levin, Auerbach wrote a microscopic theory which serves as the basis for understanding heavy fermion materials. In 1988, together with Daniel Arovas, Auerbach formulated the Schwinger boson description of the quantum Heisenberg model, which has applications in the theory of quantum magnets and spin liquids. Auerbach made contributions to the theory of the quantum Hall effect and to understanding the response of superconductors and metals to electromagnetic fields, radiation, and thermal gradients.

His students include Professors Ehud Altman of the University of California, Berkeley (formerly at the Weizmann Institute), Erez Berg of the Weizmann Institute, Netanel Lindner of the Technion, and Snir Gazit of the Hebrew University.

Auerbach authored over 100 research articles and six book chapters, as well as two books: a textbook for graduate students on interacting electrons and quantum magnetism, and a graphic novel aimed at making the Maxwell's demon paradox accessible to the general public (co-written with his brother-in-law, illustrator Richard Codor).

== Personal life ==
Auerbach was married to Margaret (Maggie, née Hundley) and was the father of one son and two daughters. His daughter, Sivan Auerbach, is a runner and Israeli champion in the women's 1000 and 1500-meter events. He lived in Ein Ayala, and his hobbies included running, hiking, and playing jazz piano.

He died in February 2025, aged 69, while running. Auerbach is buried in the Ein Ayala cemetery.

== Prizes and recognition ==
- Sloan fellowship (1989–1993)
- Milton and Lilian Eduards memorial lectures (1991–1995)
- Sidney and Elizabeth Korov chair for exact sciences (2005)
- Fellow of the Israeli Physical Society (2021)

== Books ==
- A. Auerbach, Interacting Electrons and Quantum Magnetism, Springer-Verlag, New York (1994).
- A. Auerbach and R. Codor, Max The Demon vs Entropy of Doom, Looseline Productions (2017).
