= Roderich Moessner =

German physicist

Roderich Moessner is a theoretical physicist at the Max Planck Institute for the Physics of Complex Systems in Dresden, Germany. His research interests are in condensed matter and materials physics, especially concerning new and topological forms of order, as well as the study of classical and quantum many-body dynamics in and out of equilibrium.

== Life and career ==
Moessner studied physics at Oxford University, where he was a student of Neil Tanner's at Hertford College. At Oxford, he also received his doctorate in theoretical physics under the supervision of John Chalker. After three years as a postdoctoral researcher at Princeton University between 1998 and 2001, he joined the Centre National de la Recherche Scientifique in France, where he did research at the Laboratoire de Physique Théorique at the École normale supérieure, Paris, until 2006. After a faculty appointment at Somerville College in Theoretical Physics at Oxford University, he joined the Max Planck Institute for the Physics of Complex Systems in Dresden as director of the condensed matter division and Scientific Member of the Max Planck Society. Since 2008, he is also honorary professor at TU Dresden.

== Research and publications ==
Moessner's research interests range widely in theoretical condensed matter physics. With Claudio Castelnovo and Shivaji L. Sondhi, Roderich Moessner is known for the theoretical proposition of realizing magnetic monopoles as emergent quasiparticles within a condensed matter system known as spin ice. Other notable results include the theoretical prediction of charge-density wave phases in quantum Hall physics, the identification and theory of a classical spin liquid on the pyrochlore lattice (both with J. T. Chalker); the theoretical discovery of the resonating valence bond liquid phase in the triangular lattice quantum dimer model (with S. L. Sondhi); and the proposal of a new type of spatiotemporal order, the πι-spin glass, now known as discrete time crystal (with V. Khemani, A. Lazarides and S. L. Sondhi), with experimental follow-up work on Google's Sycamore quantum computing platform. He has engaged extensively in experimental collaborations, e.g., on the dynamics of quantum spin liquids or the observation of magnetic monopoles in the material Dy_{2}Ti_{2}O_{7}.

An overview of Roderich Moessner's research articles has been published on his webpage. Most are freely available in preprint form on the arxiv.

Furthermore, together with Joel E. Moore of the University of California, Berkeley, Moessner has published a book on "Topological Phases of Matter", a textbook for use of advanced undergraduates, graduate students, or active researchers. He has also co-edited the lecture notes on topological condensed matter physics of a Les Houches summer school 2014.

== Scholarships, prizes, and distinctions ==
- Honorary Fellow, Hertford College, Oxford, 2019
- Physical Review E 25th Anniversary Milestone article of 2014 (declared in 2018).
- Gottfried Wilhelm Leibniz Prize 2013 of the German Research Foundation (DFG), jointly with Achim Rosch, for their contributions to the physics of strongly interacting quantum systems
- European Physical Society Condensed Matter Division Europhysics Prize 2012 shared with his theory collaborators Shivaji L. Sondhi, Claudio Castelnovo, as well as experimentalists Steven T. Bramwell, Santiago Grigera and Alan Tennant for the prediction and experimental observation of magnetic monopoles in spin ice
- Fellow of the American Physical Society
- Domus Senior Scholar, Merton College, Oxford University
- Scott Prize of Oxford University, 1994, for the best final examination in physics at the University of Oxford.
- Scholar of the German National Scholarship Foundation (Studienstiftung)

== Community service ==
- Member of editorial board, Physik Journal
- Member of the executive board of the German Physical Society (DPG)
- Member of the Board council of the German Physical Society
- Divisional Associate Editor of the Physical Review Letters
- Board member of cluster of excellence ct.qmat
- Co-spokesperson of Helmholtz Virtual Institute "New states of matter and their excitations"

== Popular culture ==
Magnetic monopoles in spin ice featured in an episode of The Big Bang Theory not long after the theoretical proposal, while time crystals appeared in an episode of Star Trek: Discovery.
