= Operation Shoter =

- Part of the 1948 Arab–Israeli War
| Date | July 24–26, 1948 |
| Location | South of Haifa, Former Mandatory Palestine 32°38′41″N 34°59′17″E |
| Result | Israeli victory; Most Little Triangle villagers fled or were expelled |

Belligerents
| Israel | Palestinian Arabs |

Commanders and leaders
| (Israel) Ben Zion Fridan (33rd) | |

Strength
| Reinforced battalion | 800 troops |
- Location within Mandatory Palestine

Operation Shoter (Hebrew: מִבְצָע שׁוֹטֵר, Mivtza Shoter, lit. Operation Policeman), also Operation Jaba', was a three-day Israeli operation during the 1948 Arab–Israeli War which took place in three villages, Ayn Ghazal, Ijzim and Jaba', which compromised the "Little Triangle" area south of Haifa. The official operational objective was to clear the Tel Aviv – Haifa Road, which had been closed by local militia. Israelis had been forced to take a long route to the east through Wadi Milk. The operation was launched a week after the start of the second truce imposed by the United Nations on 18 July 1948. Attacks on Israeli traffic had continued during the truce. The operation was carried out by the Alexandroni's 33rd Battalion with support from additional Golani and Carmeli units. The Arab forces were irregular local militia compromised of villagers.

According to Meron Benvenisti, IDF actions over course of the Second Truce "were con-centrated on the 'cleansing' of small pockets of Arab villages situated in areas considered to be 'strategic,' where the presence of Arabs was regarded as constituting a security risk. Thus the three villages on the western slope of the Carmel [...] were occupied and destroyed."

Israeli forces attacked on July 24 and July 25, but were delayed by stiff resistance and poor planning. Following heavy artillery shelling and air force bombing, the Little Triangle's defenses broke and the three villages surrendered on July 26. The operation caused the expulsion and flight of most Little Triangle villagers, variously estimated at around 7,000 to 8,000 people.

Initially United Nations peace envoy Folke Bernadotte said that UN observers had found "no evidence to support claims of massacre. However, following a thorough investigation, in mid-September Bernadotte released a more detailed report stating that the UN had put the number of killed or missing from the three villages at around 130, finding that all of the inhabitants had been forced to evacuate, two of the villages had been "systematically destroyed", and that Israel's attack was "unjustified" and in violation of the truce.

== Background ==
The Arab villages of Mount Carmel served as staging points for attacks on Jewish traffic in the three roads surrounding them, especially on the Tel Aviv – Haifa Road, during the 1947–48 Civil War in Mandatory Palestine. The road and its surrounding area was the site of frequent skirmishes between Arab and Jewish forces. After the Haganah captured Haifa in April 1948, momentum shifted in its favor, and it was slowly able to capture all of the villages outlooking the road: the Druze villages allied themselves with the Haganah, and Balad ash-Sheikh, Umm az-Zinat and Tantura were captured in April–May, 1948. Tira was taken on July 16.

By the second truce of the war that began on July 18, only three villages remained, located about 20 km south of Haifa—Ayn Ghazal, Ijzim and Jaba', dubbed "The Little Triangle". These villages had refused to let in the Arab Liberation Army during the civil war, but did not ally themselves with the Jewish forces. During the ten days between the first and second truce, this triangle enjoyed calm, as the Alexandroni Brigade, responsible for the area, was participating in operations Danny and Betek. Sniper fire from village militiamen effectively closed this road, but by the beginning of the truce they were completely cut off from other Arab forces. The village residents also set up roadblocks and mines, and dug trenches and foxholes along the road. The commander of the triangle was in contact with the Iraqi Army nearby, and there was an Israeli fear that the Iraqis would attempt to connect with his forces. The coastal road was the main traffic artery between the central and northern parts of Israel; not having access to it meant that all traffic and supplies had to go east through Wadi Milk, a dangerous route which also passed close to Arab villages.

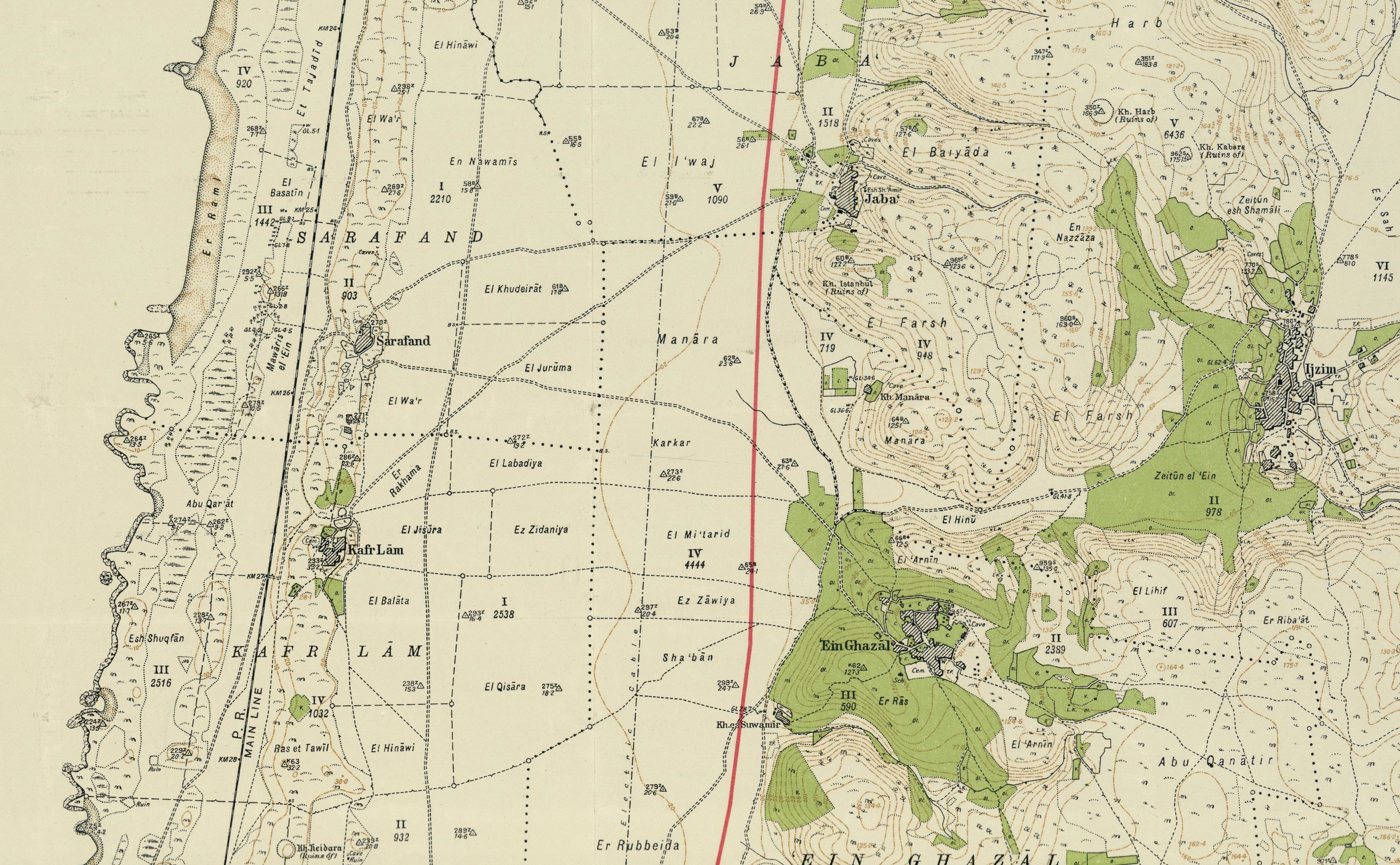
The Little Triangle 1938 1:20,000

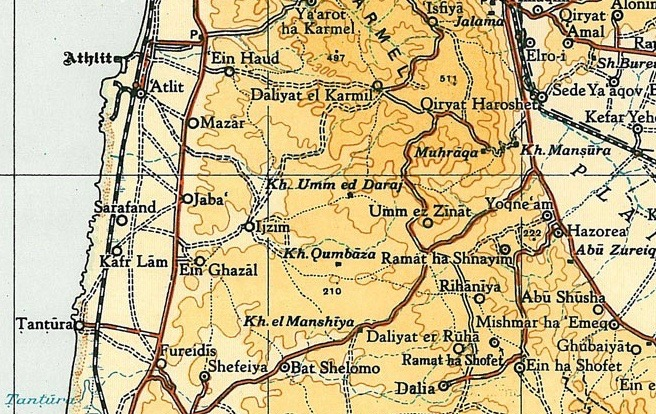
The Little Triangle 1:250,000

== Prelude ==
=== Prior deliberations and failed assaults ===
The Israel Defense Forces made attempts to capture the villages blocking the road on June 18 and July 8, but failed to overtake them, in part due to the villages' superior strategic position. This put the Arab forces on high alert, and increased their morale. The July 8 assault was conducted as a retaliation for a particular Arab attack on the Tel Aviv – Haifa road. The forces reported that:

During the attack, the enemy showed quick orientation, good command, an aggressive spirit and a proneness to attack. An obvious trait was the abundance of automatic weaponry – especially Bren machine guns, Hotchkiss machine guns and 52 mm mortars.

On July 14, 1948, in a cabinet meeting, Finance Minister Eliezer Kaplan commented that the Little Triangle was putting lives in danger, and asked what was being done about this. Prime Minister David Ben-Gurion replied that:

A ceasefire will be declared. These villages are in our pocket. We will be able to act against them also after the [start of the] ceasefire. It will be a police operation. If residents of a state fire – they are arrested. They are not considered an enemy, because the territory is ours and they are residents of the state.

Following the success at Tira on July 16 a follow-up was tried in Jaba' and Ayn-Ghazal. It was estimated that the Arab fighters who fled Tira moved to the Little Triangle. Three companies of the Guard Corps and Israel Navy were allocated, as well as a number of cannons and armored vehicles. At 10:30, the artillery and INS Wedgwood began firing at the villages, and at 14:30, the infantry forces moved on the villages. Two positions were captured by one of the companies, but an order was given to retreat. Another company met with heavy resistance and retreated. The navy suffered 2 killed and 7 wounded, with more casualties among the other units.

=== Planning and preparations ===
On July 18 two Israeli motorists were killed and the IDF informed the villagers that they must surrender or be evacuated. The second truce of the war came to effect on that day, however (earlier than the Israelis had originally predicted, as indeed they had planned to attack the villages during wartime), and the IDF was prevented from conducting a military operation there. However, shooting at vehicles continued after the ceasefire and the Israelis believed it was a problem that had to be solved. Thus, the justification for such operation was that the territory in question was part of the Jewish state according to the 1947 Partition Plan and therefore a police operation was permitted there, hence the name, "Policeman" (Shoter). The plan was to besiege the triangle with armored units and artillery, while the actual capture would be made by military police, and the Alexandroni and Carmeli brigades. A military police force was added to the plan to give it the appearance of a policing action. The operational planners initially assumed that the Arab force consisted of less than one company and the MPs were new recruits who had not yet completed basic training. They were used because the military police could not spare any other troops. Moshe Zadok, head of the IDF Manpower Directorate, assured the Chief MP Officer, Danny Magen, that his troops would not be engaged in combat, but would rather watch from the sidelines. The military police's planning and logistics were described as "amateurish"—the soldiers received defective helmets, their attack was set to a time when the rising sun would blind them, and command posts assigned to soldiers who had previously served in the Jewish Brigade due to a lack of qualified commanders.

The Alexandroni Brigade plan, unlike military police estimates, envisioned the Arab force having about 800 highly trained and disciplined soldiers, including Iraqis and a handful of British deserters, mortars, three armored vehicles and one cannon. Their operational plan included a simultaneous attack by a Golani company from the 15th Battalion, which would attack from Atlit through Mazar in the north; and Alexandroni's 33rd Battalion from Bat Shlomo through Meir Shfeya in the south. A Carmeli battalion would block the approaches from the southeast, next to Ayn Ghazal, and eight armored vehicles along with a bulldozer and Guard Corps troops would clear obstacles on the main road and stage diversions.

Between July 20 and 24, the Little Triangle came under constant bombing from the Israeli Air Force's Galilee Squadron based in Yavne'el and Ramat David. Even though many of the B-17 bombers and the Douglas DC-5 missed their targets due to the low density of the villages, and despite coming under friendly anti-aircraft fire, the bombing runs had a significant effect on the local population.

== Operation ==
On July 24, six 65 mm Napoleonchik guns were stationed about 3 km to the west of the villages, and mortars were put to the southeast. At 22:40, a Golani company left a farm near Mazar (north of Jaba') to attack the Arab positions. They encountered an ambush and retreated after 6–9 soldiers were injured.

At midnight, Alexandroni and Carmeli companies set out to attack Ayn Ghazal from the south, accompanied by military police forces. An aerial attack commenced at 00:20, and despite a request from Alexandroni to stop, made another run at 01:10. at 01:15, the six artillery pieces started to bombard the villages. By 02:35 on July 25, the Alexandroni company (the 1st) had captured a hill about 1 km south of Ayn Ghazal. By 05:30, they were in control of a yet closer hilltop position, where they halted, dug in, and sent a request for food and water.

At 03:20, Israeli armored vehicles attempted to clear the main road from the south, but were stopped at a roadblock at Khirbat as-Sawamir. They were fired at by friendly Avia S-199 aircraft that had misidentified them, although no casualties were reported. Meanwhile, the Golani forces regrouped and at 19:50 set out to attack Jaba' again. They captured its main position at 21:45. Also in the evening, Alexandroni sent two more companies into the battle. The 4th reinforced the first, capturing the main position of Ayn Ghazal (Position 17) between midnight and 02:20, while the 3rd Company attacked a position between Ayn Ghazal and Ijzim at 00:10. Radio contact with the 3rd was lost at that point, until 07:00 when the company reported that it established itself on hills overlooking Jaba'. By 01:00, Carmeli had captured Ijzim's main position, aided by Rapide and Auster light aircraft from the Tel Aviv-based 1st Squadron. Ijzim entered negotiations to surrender.

By this time, most of the Arab defenders retreated to the southeast, and east through Wadi al-Matabil and Khirbat Qumbaza. A Carmeli force from Bat Shlomo, as well as Guard Corps members, intercepted one of the retreat routes. Prisoners interrogated later are quoted, in a report to the Israeli General Staff, as claiming that fleeing villagers were "repeatedly fired on by Israeli soldiers and aircraft." In all, the 60 Arabs were killed during their flight. At 07:00 on July 26, Ayn Ghazal itself was captured by Alexandroni's 1st Company. At 07:25, after the 3rd Company occupied Jaba', all of the military positions in the triangle were under Israeli control. At 09:30, a final air raid was conducted on Ijzim, and shortly afterward, the mukhtar of the village came forward to sign an unconditional surrender.

The retreating Arabs, about 800 in number, eventually reached Iraqi lines at 'Ara and Ar'ara under the command of Khaleel Jassim, where they received good treatment and provisions. They escaped with an estimated 810 rifles and 20 Bren guns, which, according to Arab sources, were buried and not used.

== Aftermath ==
The operation captured the final Arab pocket on the Tel Aviv – Haifa road, thereby freeing it for Israeli civilian and military traffic. Roadblocks were removed by the IDF, and traffic along the coastal railway between Haifa and Hadera was also restored. The operation significantly reduced the prestige of the military police in the IDF.

According to Israeli historian Benny Morris, most of the residents of the three Little Triangle villages fled or were expelled before, during, or after the attack. Most of Ayn Ghazal and Jaba were destroyed in the attack.

In 1949, the villages Kerem Maharal, Ein Ayala and Geva Carmel were established in the vicinity of Ijzim, Ayn Ghazal and Jaba', although there is disagreement on whether they were established on lands belonging to these villages.

=== Allegations of atrocities and ceasefire violation ===
Azzam Pasha, the Secretary General of the Arab League issued a statement alleging that atrocities were committed during and after the attacks; in particular it was stated that 28 people, most of whom had been refugees from al-Tira, had been burned alive. The IDF rejected these allegations but admitted that their soldiers had found 25–30 bodies at Ayn Ghazal in "an advanced state of decomposition", which they claim they burned for lack of timber; the bodies were only partially consumed by the flames, and the soldiers made the captured villagers bury the remains.

On July 28, a United Nations observer visited the Triangle and, according to UN peace envoy Folke Bernadotte, found "no evidence to support claims of massacre." The next morning, a team of UN observers came to survey the damage and did not find any bodies; "But they were not looking hard. There were bodies in the villages, lying under rubble, in the outlying militia outposts, and in the surrounding hills, of those strafed and shelled by IDF aircraft and artillery, or killed in ambushes." According to an IDF report, they had found and buried around 200 bodies. The UN went on to see the refugees of the three villages, now camped around Jenin, and found 8,111, while 63 were declared missing and 62 killed.

However, following a UN investigation that August, on September 8, Bernadotte produced a more detailed report, concluding that the assault on the villages was unjustified, especially in view of an offer from the villagers to negotiate, which the Israelis had ignored, and that the in the days before the assault, the villagers had done nothing to violate the truce; however the assault itself was a violation of the truce. The UN investigators put the number of villagers killed at 130. The report also condemned the "systematic" demolition of Ayn Ghazal and Jaba'. In conclusion the report demanded that Israel allow the return of the villagers and assist in the rebuilding of their homes.

By the time Israel's Foreign Minister Moshe Sharett issued his response refusing this demand on September 28, Bernadotte had been assassinated by the militant Zionist group Lehi. His replacement, Ralph Bunche, did not pursue the matter.

== See also ==
- Depopulated Palestinian locations in Israel
