= Xiaoming Mao =

Chinese-American physicist

Xiaoming Mao (born 1980) is a Chinese and American physicist whose research concerns soft matter and biological physics, including topological order in the mechanics of metamaterials, self-assembly, jamming and the glass transition, and the fiber network mechanics of polymers and biopolymers. She is a professor of physics at the University of Michigan.

== Education and career ==
Mao was born in 1980 in Xi'an, and has a 2002 bachelor's degree in physics from Peking University, with a minor in economics. She went to the University of Illinois Urbana-Champaign for graduate study in physics, receiving a master's degree in 2004 and completing her Ph.D. in 2008. Her dissertation, Statistical Physics of Soft Random Solids: Vulcanization, Heterogeneity, and Elasticity, was supervised by Paul Goldbart.

After postdoctoral study from 2008 to 2012 at the University of Pennsylvania, she joined the University of Michigan in 2012 as an assistant professor. She was promoted to associate professor in 2019 and full professor in 2023.

== Recognition ==
Mao was named as a Fellow of the American Physical Society (APS) in 2025, after a nomination from the APS Division of Soft Matter, "for fundamental contributions in understanding marginal stability, disorder, fluctuations, and self-assembly in complex soft matter, as well as fundamental theories and experimental realizations of topological mechanical metamaterials".
