= Steven Kivelson =

American theoretical physicist (born 1954)

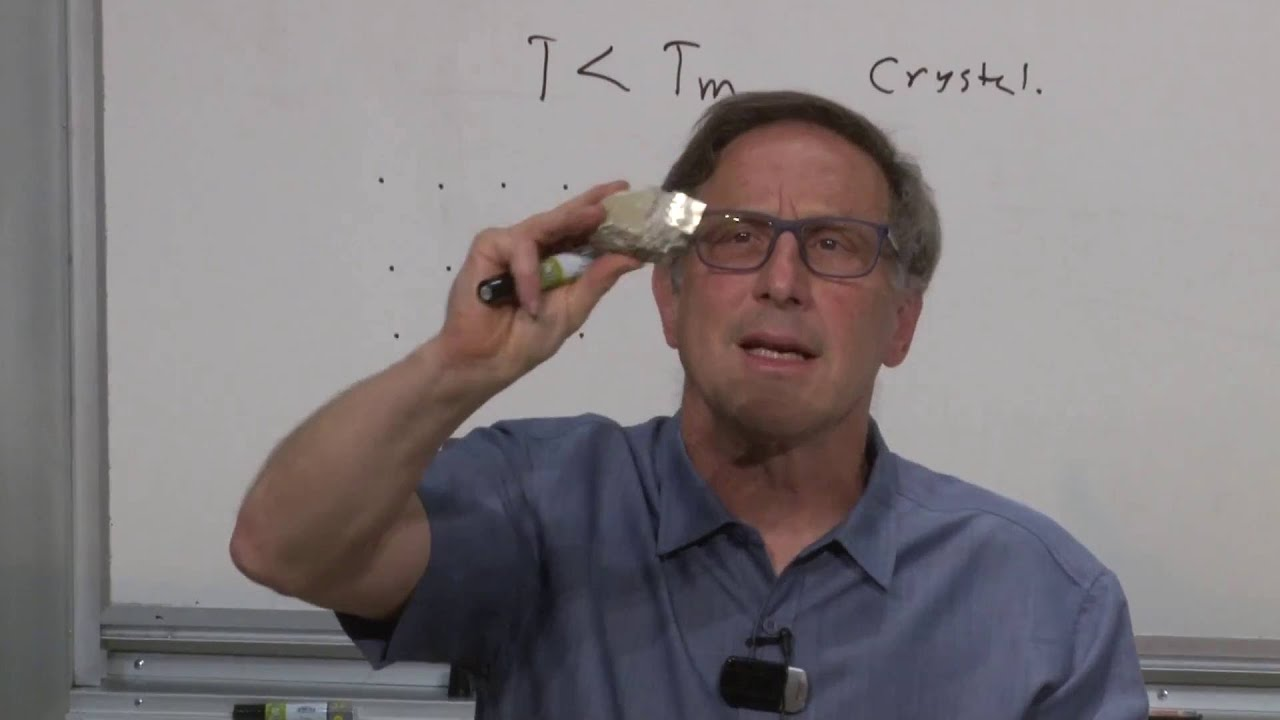
- Born: Steven Allan Kivelson; May 13, 1954 (age 72); Boston, United States
- Education: Harvard University
- Mother: Margaret Kivelson
- Awards: Oliver E. Buckley Prize (2025)
- Scientific career
- Fields: Condensed matter physics
- Workplaces: UCSB; UCLA; Stanford University
- Thesis: Studies of the Electronic Properties of Localized States in Disordered Insulators (1979)
- Doctoral advisor: C. Daniel Gelatt, Jr.
- Doctoral students: Assa Auerbach; Erica Carlson; Shivaji Sondhi

Steven Allan Kivelson (born May 13, 1954) is an American theoretical physicist known for several major contributions to condensed matter physics. He is the Prabhu Goel Family Professor at Stanford University. Before joining Stanford in 2004, he was a professor of physics at the University of California at Los Angeles. Kivelson is known for his theoretical work on high-temperature superconductivity and correlated systems.

== Biography ==
Steven Kivelson was born in Boston, Massachusetts in 1954. He is the son of Margaret Kivelson, an emeritus professor of earth and space sciences at UCLA, and Daniel Kivelson (1929–2003), who was a professor of chemistry, also at UCLA.

Kivelson received his Ph.D. from Harvard University in 1979, working with C. Daniel Gelatt, Jr. He spent three years as a postdoctoral researcher at the Institute for Theoretical Physics at the University of California, Santa Barbara, working with John Robert Schrieffer.

He then joined the faculty of the State University of New York at Stony Brook, where he was an assistant (1982–86), associate (1986–88) and full professor (1988–89). In 1988, he moved to the University of California, Los Angeles. In 2004, Kivelson joined the faculty at Stanford University, where he was appointed Prabhu Goel Family Professor of Physics in 2012.

=== Doctoral students ===
Kivelson has advised many doctoral theses, including those of Assa Auerbach (1985), Shivaji Sondhi (1992) and Erica Carlson (2000).

== Research ==
In the 1995, Victor Emery and Kivelson developed the first model for high-temperature superconductivity based on the presence and fluctuations of charge stripes. Unfortunately this model does not apply to cuprate superconductors due to the lack of charge–spin separation.

In 2001, Kivelson, Eduardo Fradkin, and Vadim Oganesyan developed the theory of nematic Fermi fluids.

== Awards and honors ==
Kivelson was awarded a Guggenheim Fellowship in 1995 and was elected to the American Academy of Arts and Sciences in 2001 and to the National Academy of Sciences in 2010. In 2012, he was awarded the Bardeen prize (with Chandra Varma and James Sauls) instituted by the University of Illinois at Urbana–Champaign.

He earned the 2025 Oliver E. Buckley Prize of the American Physical Society for "broad and insightful theoretical contributions that have significantly advanced the understanding of correlated quantum systems".

== Textbooks ==
- Kivelson, Steven A.; Jiang, Jack Mingde; Chang, Jeffrey (2024-06-25). Statistical Mechanics of Phases and Phase Transitions. Princeton University Press. ISBN 978-0-691-24973-5.
