= Eduardo Fradkin =

American-Argentinian physicist (born 1950)

- Born: February 21, 1950 (age 76); Buenos Aires, Argentina
- Education: University of Buenos Aires; Stanford University
- Known for: Composite fermions
- Scientific career
- Fields: Theoretical Physics
- Workplaces: University of Illinois at Urbana–Champaign
- Thesis: Phase Transitions in Lattice Gauge Theories (1979)
- Doctoral advisor: Leonard Susskind
- Doctoral students: Eun-Ah Kim; Antonio H. Castro Neto

Eduardo Hector Fradkin (born February 21, 1950) is an Argentinian theoretical physicist known for working in various areas of condensed matter physics, primarily using quantum field theoretical approaches. He is a Donald Biggar Willett Professor of Physics at the University of Illinois at Urbana–Champaign, where he is the director of the Institute for Condensed Matter Theory, and is the author of the books Quantum Field Theory: An Integrated Approach and Field Theories of Condensed Matter Physics.

== Education and career ==
Fradkin earned a master's degree from the University of Buenos Aires. He completed his doctorate from Stanford University in 1979, under the supervision of Leonard Susskind, and came to Illinois faculty as a postdoctoral researcher with Gordon Baym and Michael Wortis, later staying on as an assistant professor.

== Research ==
Fradkin has worked in many areas in theoretical condensed matter physics and is notably broad and versatile in his research topics. Among his most researched areas in condensed matter include the fractional quantum Hall systems and high-temperature superconductivity. He is considered one of the earliest proponents of, and one of the leading figures in, using quantum field theoretical concepts and methods in condensed matter physics, and is well known for popularizing such approaches through his early book Field Theories of Condensed Matter Physics (1st ed. Addison Wesley) in 1991.

In his doctoral work at Stanford, he made major contributions to lattice gauge theories, where his results (separately with Stephen Shenker, and Leonard Susskind) have, among other things, had far-reaching applications and implications to two-dimensional quantum spin liquids and other topologically ordered phases in two-dimensional lattices.

He has done many important works in the area of fractional quantum Hall physics, in which he and his graduate student Ana María López gave the first fermionic Chern-Simons field theory for composite fermions in 1991. He has described various field theories for non-Abelian fractional quantum Hall states (with Chetan Nayak and others), quantum Hall edge physics and, more recently, theories for describing nematicity and geometry in the fractional quantum Hall regime. One of his most influential works has been the introduction and elucidation of the powerful new paradigm in quantum many-body physics of electronic liquid crystalline phases in various strongly correlated systems (with Steven Kivelson and Victor Emery), in particular in quantum Hall systems and high-temperature superconductors, and, more recently in this area, elucidation of the notion and significance of "intertwined orders" in the context of cuprate high-temperature superconductors and more generally in strongly correlated systems (with Steven Kivelson and John Tranquada). He has also made important contributions to the physics of quantum dimer models (partly with Shivaji Sondhi and others), models for unconventional quantum phase transitions involving topologically ordered phases (with Paul Fendley and others), and quantum entanglement properties of these and related problems. He also gave one of the earliest approaches to higher dimensional bosonization of fermionic field theories (with Fidel Schaposnik) as well as two-dimensional Fermi surfaces (with his then student Antonio H. Castro Neto) and has later applied them to important problems in condensed matter. Some of his other important works in recent times that have not already been mentioned above include a graph-theoretic lattice discretization scheme for Chern-Simons theories and its applications to condensed matter problems, and novel field theoretic approaches to describe fractional topological insulators.

== Awards and honors ==
In 1998, he was awarded the Guggenheim fellowship. In 2013 he was elected to the National Academy of Sciences. He is also a fellow of the American Academy of Arts and Sciences and of the American Physical Society. In 2024 he was awarded the Eugene Feenberg Memorial Medal "for pioneering applications of quantum field theory to the understanding of emergent, many-body physics of quantum systems, in particular composite fermions, and electronic liquid crystalline and pair density wave phases of correlated electronic systems."
