= Jaba', Haifa =

Jaba' Dscheba, Jeba
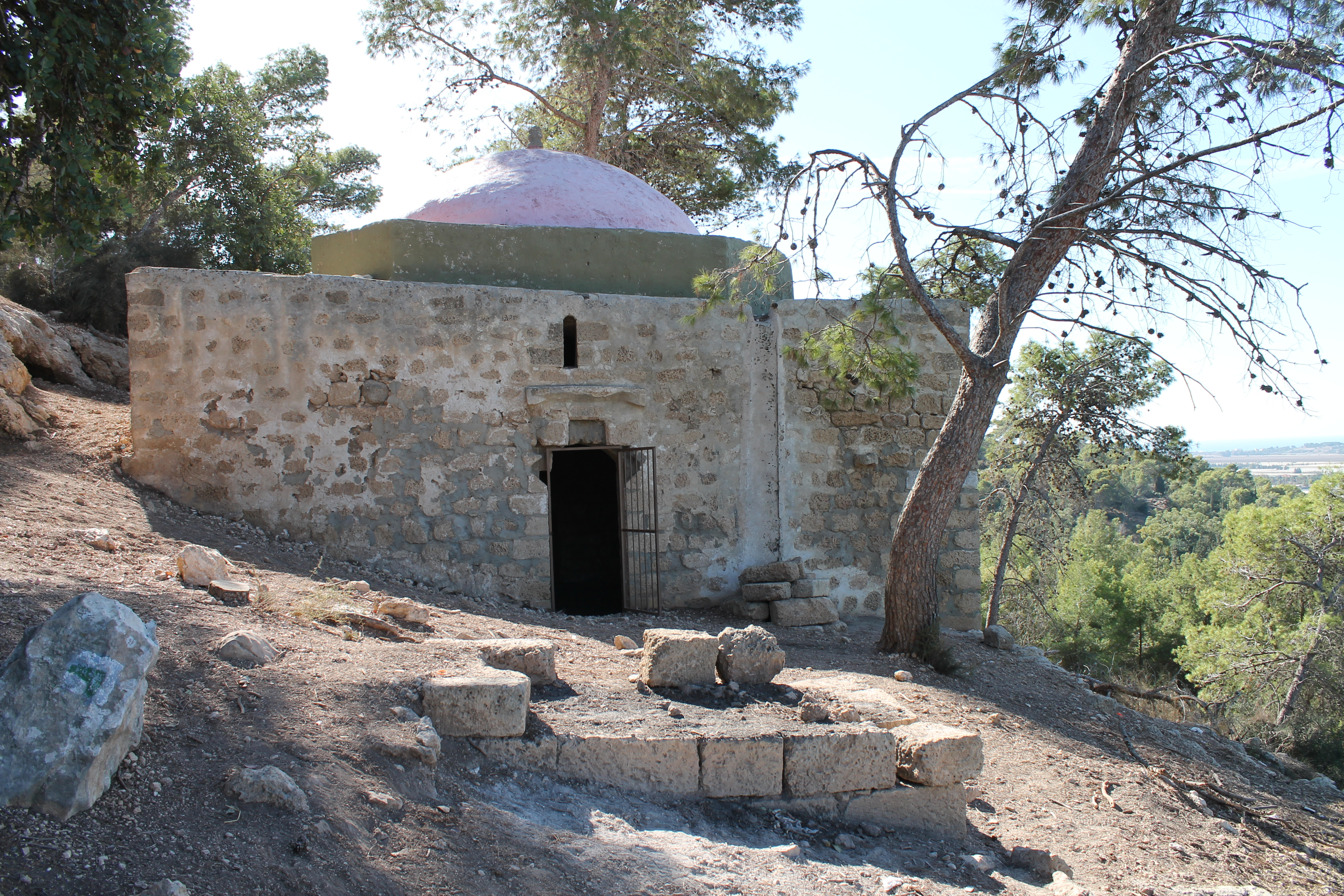
- Tomb of Shaykh Amir, Jaba, in 2013
- Etymology: Hill
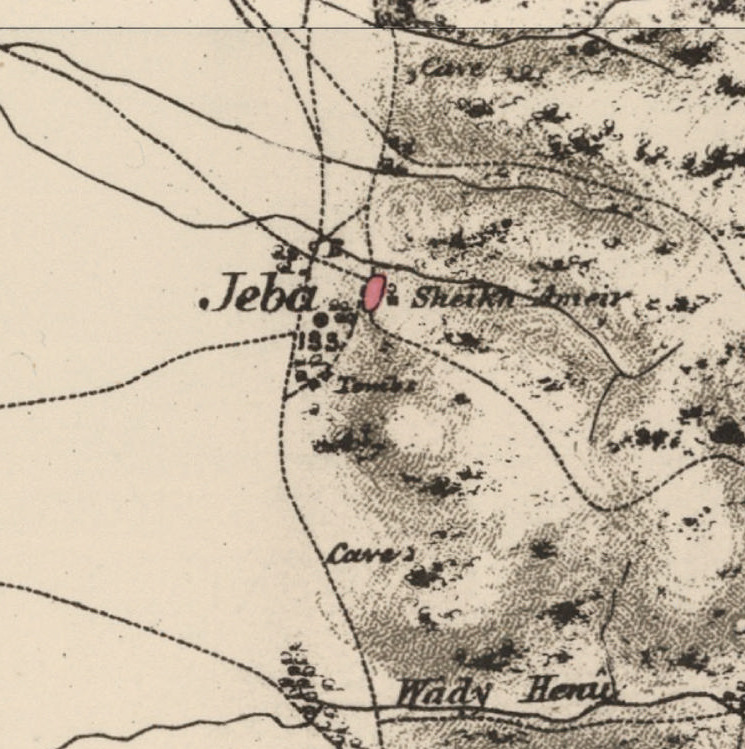
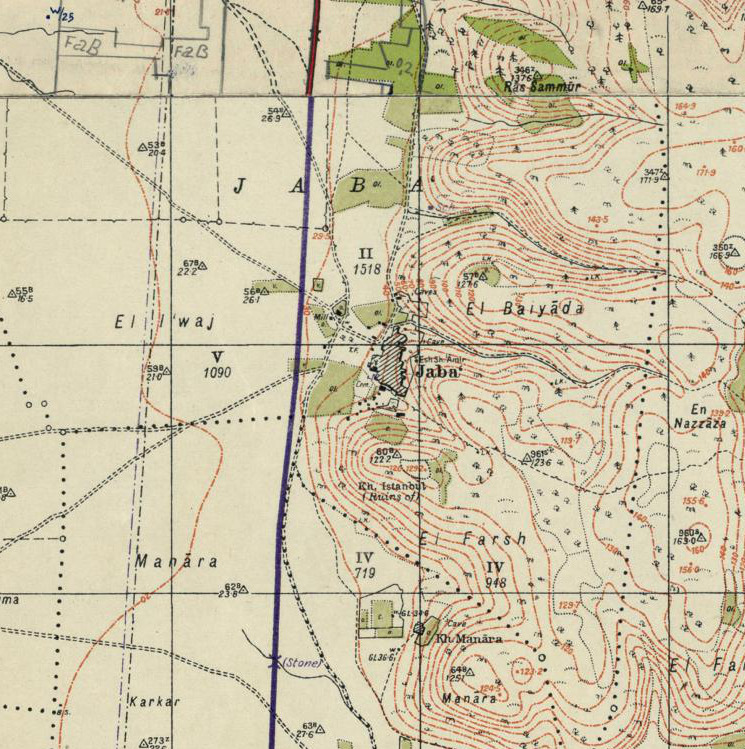
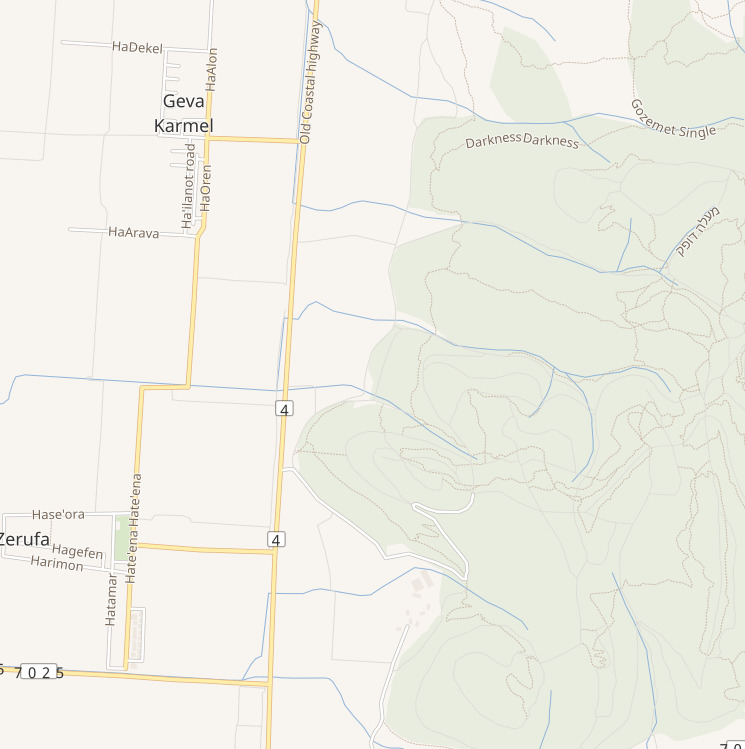
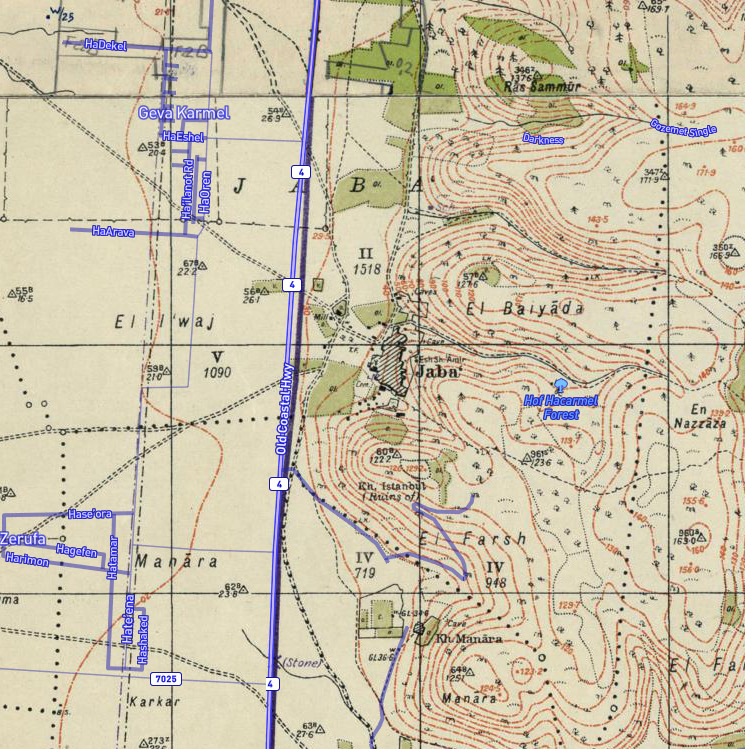
- 1870s map 1940s map modern map 1940s with modern overlay map A series of historical maps of the area around Jaba', Haifa

- Location within Mandatory Palestine
- Coordinates: 32°39′15″N 34°57′47″E
- Palestine grid: 146/228
- Geopolitical entity: Mandatory Palestine
- Subdistrict: Haifa
- Date of depopulation: 24–26 July 1948

Area
  - Total: 7,012 dunams (7.012 km^{2}; 2.707 sq mi)

Population (1945)
  - Total: 1,140
- Cause(s) of depopulation: Military assault by Yishuv forces
- Current Localities: Geva Karmel

Jaba' (Arabic: جبع), was a Palestinian Arab village in the Haifa Subdistrict. It was depopulated during the 1948 Arab-Israeli War on July 24, 1948, as part of Operation Shoter. It was located 18.5 km south of Haifa, near Carmel, and ca. 3.25 kilometers (2.02 mi) east of the Mediterranean Sea.

== History ==
=== Classic era ===
Emil Schürer, writing in 1891, identifies this site with a village featuring prominently in the writings of the Jewish historian, Josephus. In the late 1st century BCE, Herod the Great had built a village for his veteran cavalry, and, according to E. Schürer, called this town the city of horsemen.

Archaeologist Benjamin Mazar, disputing Schürer in 1957, thought that Gaba of the Horsemen (Geba), mentioned by Josephus in The Jewish War 3.3.1, ought to be identified with the ruin Ḫirbet el-Ḥârithîye (now Sha'ar HaAmakim), since in relation to Simonias, it better fits Josephus' description of Gaba / Gibea (Greek: Γάβα) in Vita § 24 being distant from Simonias 60 stadia (about 11 km.), in addition to the fact that in relation to Besara (Beit She'arin), Gaba / Gibea (Ḫirbet el-Ḥârithîye) stood at a distance of only 20 stadia (about 4 km.) from Besara, also in agreement with Josephus.

=== Ottoman era ===
Jaba' was incorporated into the Ottoman Empire in 1517, like all of Palestine. During the 16th and 17th centuries, Jaba' belonged to the Turabay Emirate (1517–1683), which encompassed also the Jezreel Valley, Haifa, Jenin, Beit She'an Valley, northern Jabal Nablus, Bilad al-Ruha/Ramot Menashe, and the northern part of the Sharon plain.

In the 1596 tax registers, it was part of the nahiya ("subdistrict") of Jabal Atlit, part of the larger Sanjak of Lajjun. It had a population of 18 households, all Muslims. The inhabitants paid a fixed tax rate of 25% on agricultural products, including wheat, barley, summer crops, goats and beehives, in addition to occasional revenues; a total of 7,800 akçe.

In 1859, the English Consul Rogers found the population to be 150 souls, with 18 feddans of cultivation.

In 1873, the PEF's Survey of Western Palestine (SWP) visited and found: “There are two closed rock tombs in the ledge south of the village, and a third with a courtyard 14 feet square, sunk 2 feet; two doors lead into chambers. One has three loculi, one on each wall; the other has two loculi and a recess 5 feet 6 inches, with two parallel graves under one arcosolium placed like kokim with the feet to the chamber. This is therefore a transitional example. (Compare Sheikh Bureik)

There are several caves north of the village, and another tomb at the head of the valley forming the recess in which the village stands."

In 1882, the SWP described it: "A small village in a recess on the hill-slope close to the plain; the houses principally of stone. It has a good olive-yard on the west below the village, in which yard the Survey Camp was placed. The water-supply is from a well on the north-west, which has a wheel and troughs. The place seems ancient, having rock-cut tombs and caves.

Jaba' had an elementary school for boys, which was founded by the Ottomans in 1885.

An illustration of a lead weight (62x55mm, 212.2 gram) found in 1981 at Tel Shush, with Greek inscription of the city "Gabe", identified as "Geva' Parashim.

=== British Mandate era ===
In the British Mandate of Palestine period, in the 1922 census of Palestine Jaba had a population of 523; all Muslims, increasing in the 1931 census to 762; 2 Christians and the rest Muslim, in a total of 158 houses.

In the 1945 statistics this had increased to 1,140, all Muslims with a total of 7,012 dunams of land. Of this, 450 dunums were plantations or irrigable land, 4,255 were for cereals, while 60 dunams were classified built-up, (urban), land.

The site has several ancient ruins, including mosaics and tombs.

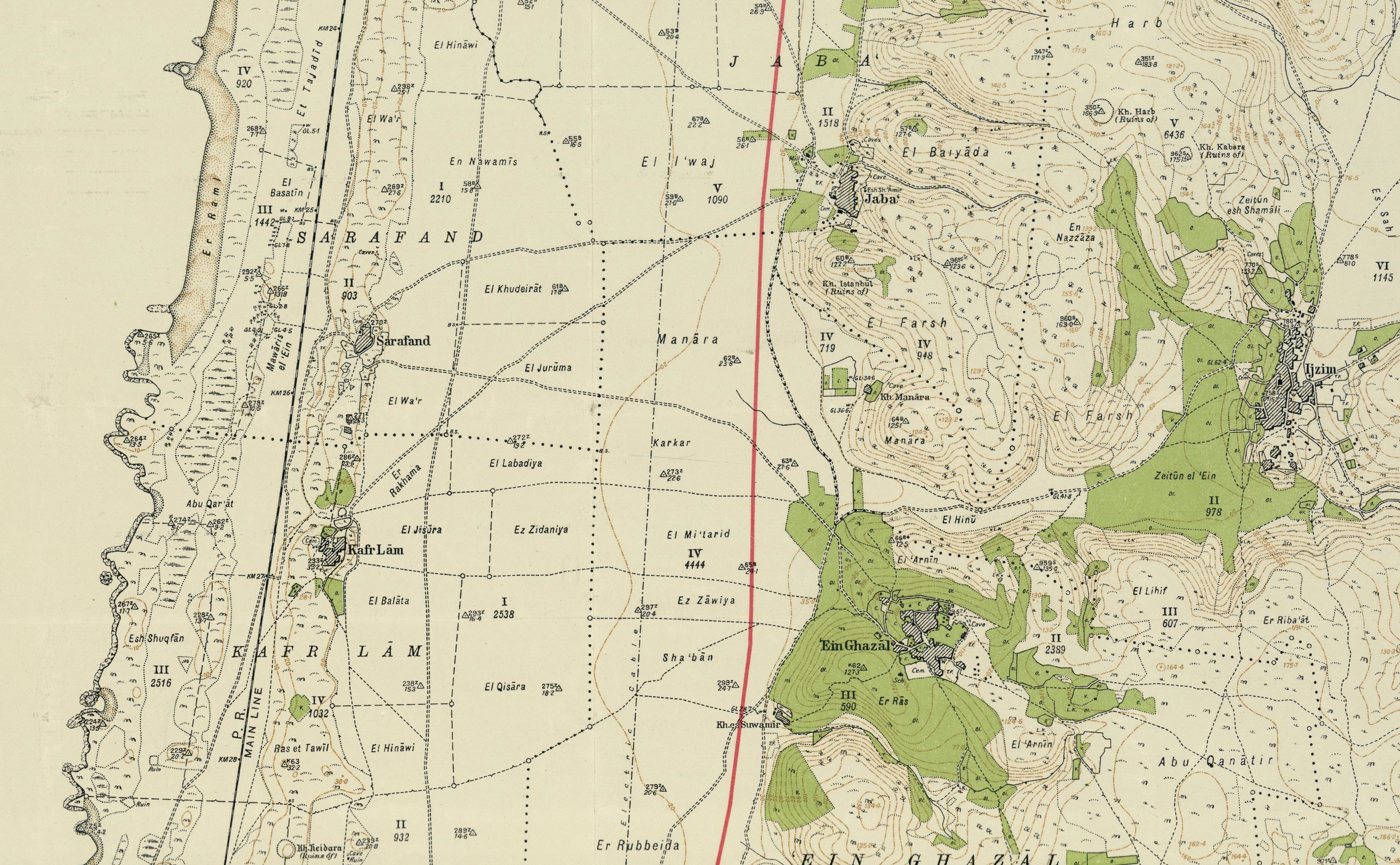
Jaba' 1938 1:20,000

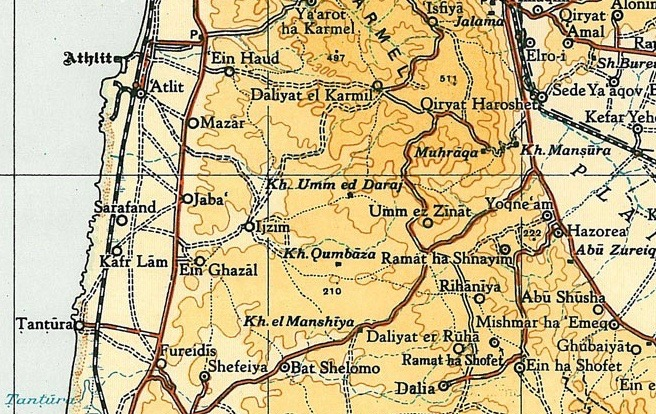
Jaba' 1945 1:250,000

=== 1948, aftermath ===
Jaba was in the territory allotted to the Jewish state under the 1947 UN Partition Plan. During the war the militia from the village fired on Jewish vehicles along the essential coast road. In early June 1948, an Israel Defense Forces (IDF) report shows that Ja'ba, together with Ijzim and Ayn Ghazal, were asking the IDF, "to open negotiation for surrender." Nothing resulted from the request. On 14 July, before the Second truce of the 1948 Arab–Israeli War, the Israeli cabinet discussed the three villages in "The Little Triangle". Ben-Gurion said that there was no need to hurry:

"these villages are in our pocket [...] We can act against them also after the [reinstitution of the] truce. This will be a police action... They are not regarded as enemy forces as their area is ours [i.e., in Israel] and they are inhabitants of the state...[and] these villages do not represent a military danger."

The second truce, beginning on the 18 July, was not violated by the villagers.

According to Meron Benvenisti, IDF actions over course of the Second Truce were concentrated on "cleansing" small clusters of Arab villages located in "strategic" areas. Ja'ba was depopulated along with two other villages (Ijzim and 'Ayn Ghazal) located on the western slopes of the Carmel mountains between July 24 and 26. A week after the start of the truce, Israel undertook Operation Shoter ("Operation Policeman"), with the aim of conquering the "Little Triangle" villages. The operation was executed by a combination of brigades from the Israel Defense Forces and the military police. On July 25, street fighting was reported from Ayn Ghazal and Ja'ba. On the morning of the next day, the villages were found deserted.

In September, 1948, when the UN demanded the right of the villagers to return, the Israelis said that the village had fired upon Jewish vehicles along a coast road, and therefore denied their return.

Following the war the area was incorporated into the State of Israel. The moshav of Geva Carmel was established around one kilometer northwest of the old village site, on village land.

In 1992 the village site was described: "Piles of stone rubble can be seen on the site. A shrine still standing on an elevated part of it. Pine forests grow on the land in the vicinity, which is fenced in by barbed wire. Around the village are the remains of tombs. Parts of the site is used by Israelis as grazing land."

== Bibliography ==
- Avi-Yonah, M. (1940). Map of Roman Palestine. London: Oxford University Press. OCLC 977670060.
- Barron, J.B., ed. (1923). Palestine: Report and General Abstracts of the Census of 1922. Government of Palestine.
- Benveniśtî, M. (2000). Sacred landscape: the buried history of the Holy Land since 1948 (Illustrated ed.). University of California Press. ISBN 0-520-21154-5.
- Buhl, Frants, (1896): Geographie des alten Palästina. p. 210 ff
- Conder, C.R.; Kitchener, H.H. (1882). The Survey of Western Palestine: Memoirs of the Topography, Orography, Hydrography, and Archaeology. Vol. 2. London: Committee of the Palestine Exploration Fund. (p. 251)
- Dauphin, C. (1998). La Palestine byzantine, Peuplement et Populations. BAR International Series 726 (in French). Vol. III : Catalogue. Oxford: Archeopress. ISBN 0-860549-05-4.
- Dvorjetski, Esti (2009), "Between the Valley of Zebulun and the Valley of Jezreel: the Historical Geography of Geva-Geba-Gaba-Jaba'", Excavations of the Hellenistic site in Kibbutz Sha'ar-Ha'Amakim (Gaba) 1984-1998, Haifa: Zinman Institute of Archaeology: University of Haifa, ISBN 9789659041879, OCLC 750741899
- Government of Palestine, Department of Statistics (1945). Village Statistics, April, 1945.
- Hadawi, S. (1970). Village Statistics of 1945: A Classification of Land and Area ownership in Palestine. Palestine Liberation Organization Research Center.
- Hütteroth, W.-D.; Abdulfattah, K. (1977). Historical Geography of Palestine, Transjordan and Southern Syria in the Late 16th Century. Erlanger Geographische Arbeiten, Sonderband 5. Erlangen, Germany: Vorstand der Fränkischen Geographischen Gesellschaft. ISBN 3-920405-41-2.
- Khalidi, W. (1992). All That Remains: The Palestinian Villages Occupied and Depopulated by Israel in 1948. Washington D.C.: Institute for Palestine Studies. ISBN 0-88728-224-5.
- Mazar (Maisler), B. (1957). Beth She'arim - Report on the Excavations during 1936–40 (in Hebrew). Vol. 1 (The Catacombs I–IV). Jerusalem: Israel Exploration Society. p. 19.
- Mills, E., ed. (1932). Census of Palestine 1931. Population of Villages, Towns and Administrative Areas. Jerusalem: Government of Palestine.
- Morris, B. (2004). The Birth of the Palestinian Refugee Problem Revisited. Cambridge University Press. ISBN 978-0-521-00967-6. (pp. 96, 177, 245, 247, 299, 438-41, 457, 458)
- Mülinen, Egbert Friedrich von 1908, Beiträge zur Kenntnis des Karmels "Separateabdruck aus der Zeitschrift des Deutschen Palëstina-Vereins Band XXX (1907) Seite 117-207 und Band XXXI (1908) Seite 1-258."
- Palmer, E.H. (1881). The Survey of Western Palestine: Arabic and English Name Lists Collected During the Survey by Lieutenants Conder and Kitchener, R. E. Transliterated and Explained by E.H. Palmer. Committee of the Palestine Exploration Fund.
- Schürer, E. (1891). Geschichte des jüdischen Volkes im Zeitalter Jesu Christi [A History of the Jewish People in the Time of Jesus Christ]. Geschichte de jüdischen Volkes im Zeitalter Jesu Christi.English. Vol. 1. Translated by Miss Taylor. New York: Charles Scribner's Sons.
