= Ofer =

Ofer: עופר (Hebrew)
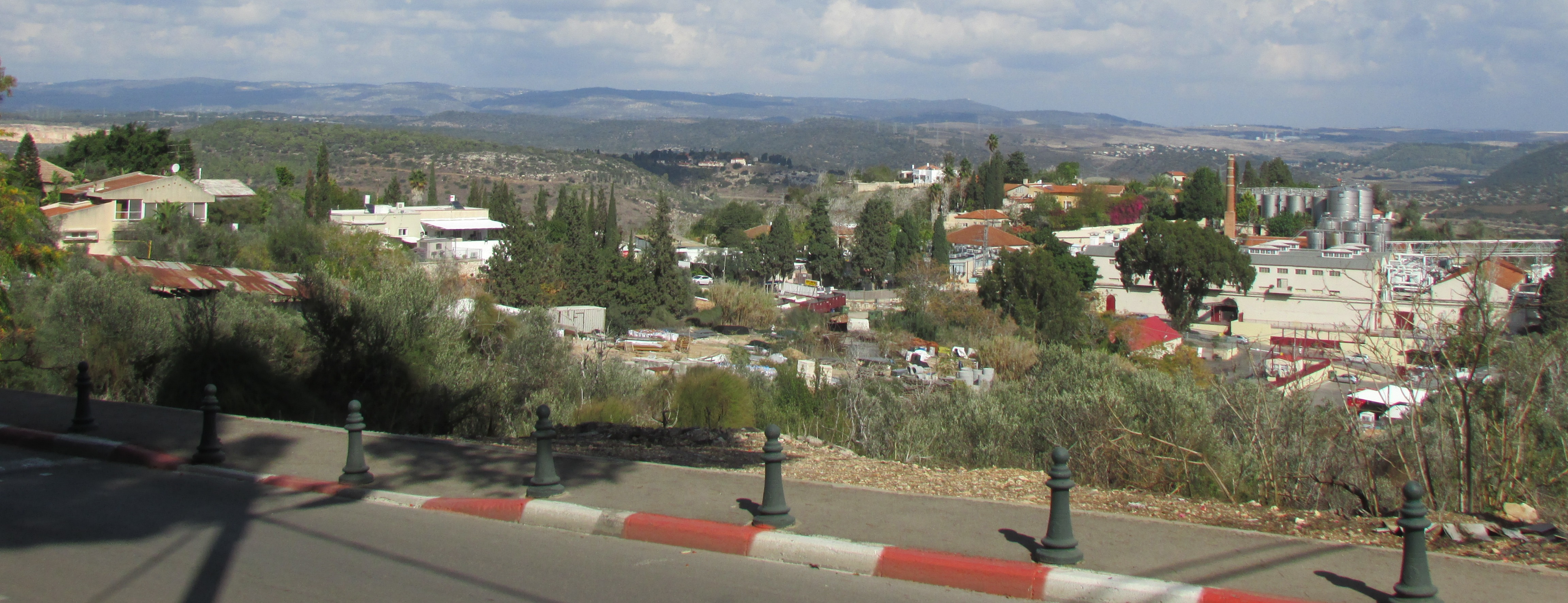
- Etymology: Fawn
- Location within Haifa region of Israel Location within Israel
- Coordinates: 32°37′22″N 34°58′56″E
- Country: Israel
- District: Haifa
- Subdistrict: Hadera
- Council: Hof HaCarmel
- Affiliation: Moshavim Movement
- Founded: 1950
- Founder: Indian and Iranian Jewish refugees
- Population (2024): 591

Ofer (Hebrew: עופר, lit. 'Fawn') is a moshav in northern Israel. Located south of Haifa, it falls under the jurisdiction of Hof HaCarmel Regional Council. In 2024 it had a population of 591.

== History ==
The moshav was founded in 1950 by immigrants from India (mainly Cochin) and Iran. Its name is derived from Ayn Ghazal (lit. Deer Spring), the depopulated Palestinian village near which it was built. It is also near the depopulated villages of Khirbat Al-Manara and Khirbat al-Sawamir.

Agricultural income is derived from raising cattle, sheep and chickens, growing vegetables and flowers, and tourism. A circular nature trail loops around moshav Ofer, the Paamon Cave and a large section of the Carmel Beach Forest.
