= Margaret G. Kivelson =

American geophysicist, planetary scientist (born 1928)

Margaret Kivelson
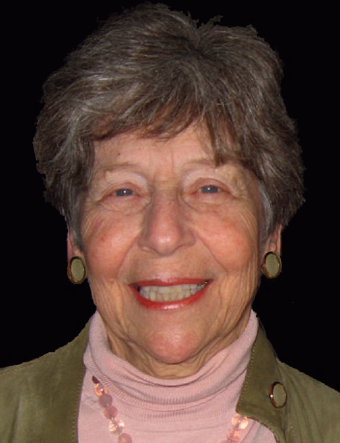
- Kivelson in 2007
- Born: Margaret Galland Kivelson; October 21, 1928 (age 97)
- Education: Radcliffe College (A.B.), Radcliffe College (A.M.), Harvard University (Ph.D.)
- Children: 2, including Steven Kivelson
- Awards: Alfven Medal (2005); Fleming Medal (2005); Gerard P. Kuiper Prize (2017); Cassini Medal (2019); Gold Medal of the Royal Astronomical Society (2019); James Clerk Maxwell Prize for Plasma Physics (2021)
- Scientific career
- Fields: Plasma physics
- Workplaces: UCLA (1967-present); University of Michigan (2010-present)
- Thesis: Bremsstrahlung of High Energy Electrons (1957)
- Doctoral advisor: Julian Schwinger

Margaret Galland Kivelson (born October 21, 1928) is an American space physicist, planetary scientist, and distinguished professor emerita of space physics at the University of California, Los Angeles. From 2010 to the present, concurrent with her appointment at UCLA, Kivelson has been a research scientist and scholar at the University of Michigan. Her primary research interests include the magnetospheres of Earth, Jupiter, and Saturn.

Recent research has also focused on Jupiter's Galilean moons. She was the principal investigator for the magnetometer on the Galileo Orbiter that acquired data in Jupiter's magnetosphere for eight years and a co-investigator on the FGM (magnetometer) of the earth-orbiting NASA-ESA Cluster mission. She is actively involved as a co-investigator on NASA's Themis mission, the magnetometer team leader for NASA's Europa Clipper Mission, as a member of the Cassini magnetometer team, and as a participant in the magnetometer team for the European JUICE mission to Jupiter. Kivelson has published over 350 research papers and is co-editor of a widely used textbook on space physics (Introduction to Space Physics).

== Early life and education ==
Kivelson was born in New York City on October 21, 1928. Her father was a medical doctor and her mother had an undergraduate degree in physics. Kivelson knew in high school that she wanted to pursue a career in science, but was unsure whether she would be successful with the career. Her uncle advised her to become a dietitian knowing that pursuing a physical science career as a woman would be hard, but she ignored this advice and began to study physics. Kivelson was accepted into Radcliffe College, Harvard's women's college in 1946, obtained her A.B. degree from Radcliffe in 1950, completed her master's degree in 1952, and was awarded her Ph.D. in physics from Harvard in 1957.

== Career ==
Kivelson completed her PhD thesis "Bremsstrahlung of High Energy Electrons' in 1957. Her thesis provided an expression for the cross section of forward scattering to all orders in the Coulomb interaction.

From 1955 to 1971 Kivelson worked as a consultant in physics at the RAND Corporation based in Santa Monica, California. There she researched the interactions of plasmas and electron gases using mathematical techniques similar to those in quantum electrodynamics. Working with Don DuBois, they derived a correction to Landau's relation for the damping excitations of unmagnetized plasma. For 1965-1966, Kivelson took a leave from RAND to join her husband's sabbatical leave in Boston. Through a fellowship from the Radcliffe Institute for Advanced Study, Kivelson was able to conduct scientific research in a university setting at Harvard and MIT.

Motivated by her experiences in academia through the Radcliffe Institute, Kivelson joined UCLA in 1967 as an assistant research geophysicist. Kivelson quickly climbed through the ranks within the geophysics and space physics community becoming a full professor at UCLA's department of earth and space sciences in 1980. She chaired the department of earth and space sciences from 1984 to 1987 and from 1999 to 2000. From 1977 to 1983 Kivelson served on the board of overseers at Harvard College as well as NASA's advisory council from 1987 to 1993, the National Research Council's Committee on Solar-Terrestrial Research from 1989 to 1992, and co-chaired the UCLA Academic Faculty Senate's Committee on Gender Equality issues from 1998 to 2000. In 2009 she became a distinguished professor of space physics, emerita and in 2010 she also took a position as a research professor at the University of Michigan.

== Scientific contributions ==
Kivelson has had a very successful career as a scientist that include many publications and original work. Some of her accomplishments are discovering an internal magnetic field at Ganymede, providing compelling evidence for a sub-surface ocean at Europa, and elucidating some of the processes explaining the behavior of ultralow frequency waves in the terrestrial magnetosphere, the discovery of cavity mode oscillations in the magnetosphere, developed new ways of describing wave-particle interactions in magnetohydrodynamic waves, and provided insight into the mechanism of interchange diffusion in rotating plasmas. This research has led Kivelson to being an author or co-author on over 350 publications that have accumulated over 12,000 citations.

== Personal life ==
She married Daniel Kivelson, a professor of chemistry, also at UCLA. They had two children. Her son Steven Kivelson is professor and condensed matter researcher at Stanford University. Margaret, Daniel and their two children all graduated from Harvard University.

== Gender gap ==
Some of Kivelson's recollections about establishing a career as a woman scientist have been documented in an interview by the American Astronomical Society and piece in the Annual Review of Earth and Planetary Sciences. When she started to pursue her undergraduate degree in physics her family joked she was really pursuing a "Mrs" degree. Before World War II, courses at Radcliffe were segregated by gender from courses at Harvard. When she attended Radcliffe/Harvard in the first class after the war, classes did not return to being segregated. She was often the only woman in her courses.

Over the course of Julian Schwinger's career he had more than 70 graduate students and of these Kivelson was his only female student. In 1954, she gave birth to her first child, and afterwards she often faced criticism for continuing to work despite being a mother. In 1955 her husband received an appointment at UCLA and she followed him to Los Angeles. She started working part-time at the RAND Corporation while completing her thesis. A few months after receiving her PhD in 1957, she gave birth to her second child.

In 1973, Kivelson won a Guggenheim Fellowship to work at the Imperial College in London. She said "that fellowship gave me for the first time the sense that I was being taken seriously as a scientist. More than money, it gave me status and increased my self-confidence considerably."

== Honors and awards ==
- Guggenheim Fellowship (1973–74)
- Radcliffe Graduate Society Medal (1983)
- Harvard University's 350th Anniversary Alumni Medal (1986)
- Fellow of the American Association for the Advancement of Science (1989)
- Fellow of the American Geophysical Union (1992)
- NASA Group Achievement Award (1995, 1996)
- Member of the National Academy of Sciences (1999)
- Member of the American Academy of Arts and Sciences (1998)
- Fellow of the American Physical Society (2001)
- Fleming Medal of the American Geophysical Union (2005)
- Alfven Medal of the European Geophysical Union (2005)
- Elected member of the American Philosophical Society (2005)
- Gerard P. Kuiper Prize of the American Astronomical Society (2017)
- Jean Dominique Cassini Medal of the European Geosciences Union (2019)
- Gold Medal of the Royal Astronomical Society (2019)
- Elected Foreign Member of the Royal Society (2020)
- James Clerk Maxwell Prize for Plasma Physics of the American Physical Society (2021)

== See also ==
- Timeline of women in science
