= Ein Ayala =

Ein Ayala: עֵין אַיָּלָה (Hebrew)
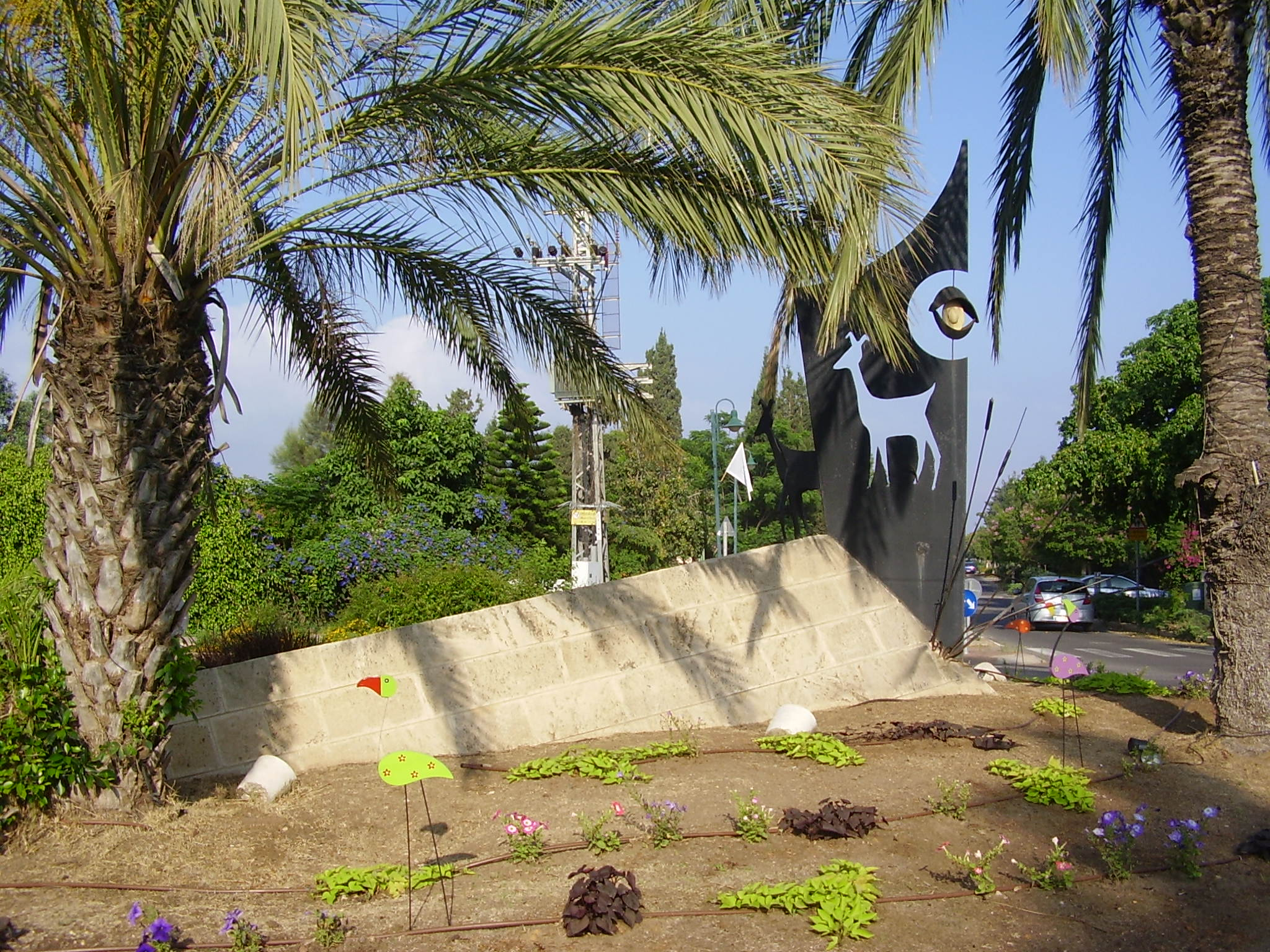

- Location within Haifa region of Israel Location within Israel
- Coordinates: 32°37′45″N 34°56′44″E
- Country: Israel
- District: Haifa
- Subdistrict: Hadera
- Council: Hof HaCarmel
- Affiliation: Moshavim Movement
- Founded: 1949
- Founder: Czechoslovak Jews
- Population (2024): 1,260
- Website: www.einayala.co.il

Ein Ayala (Hebrew: עֵין אַיָּלָה, lit. Doe Spring) is a semi-cooperative moshav in northern Israel. Located at the foot of Mount Carmel around 20 km south of Haifa, it falls under the jurisdiction of the Hof HaCarmel Regional Council. In 2024 it had a population of 1,260.

== History ==
Ein Ayala founded in 1949 by European Jewish immigrants, the majority from the region of Carpathian Ruthenia, once belonged to Czechoslovakia, now part of Ukraine, and the minority from the Bukovina region. They were Hungarian speaking. The founders came to Israel and settled in a refugee camp near Khirbat Bayt Lid before coming to the site and settling in tents. The moshav was built next to Ayn Ghazal, a Palestinian village depopulated during Operation Shoter in July 1948. Walid Khalidi writes that it is not on land previously occupied by Ayn Ghazal, but that Ein Ayala was founded on land near Kafr Lam, and cultivated land adjacent to Khirbat al-Sawamir. In April 1951 the moshav was incorporated in the newly established Hof HaCarmel Regional Council and granted municipal status.

In the early years, the 92 pioneer families found it difficult to earn a livelihood due to lack of agricultural equipment and logistical problems. Although the land around Ein Ayala was deemed highly arable, they had only one cart and no paved roads, making transportation especially difficult during the winter. The moshav received a number of cows from Switzerland, but they arrived during a drought year and did not produce much milk. A delegation of engineers from the Jewish Agency visited the moshav and determined that only 20% of the houses would last another year, as most began to develop cracks. The moshav lacked a kindergarten building for its 60 children and the power supply in the moshav was very limited despite the fact the moshav was close to a high voltage power line.

Part of the reason for the crisis was the poor layout. Rather than planning the moshav as a centralized bloc, as was common at the time, it formed a long and narrow strip stretching over two or three kilometers. This made it difficult to reach the grocery store, warehouse, kindergarten etc. Furthermore, the location of the moshav on a plain between the sea and the mountain ridge of Mount Carmel led to flooding in the winter and extremely hot temperatures in the summer.

In 2011, TheMarker listed Ein Ayala in the top ten finest communities in Israel where home prices are still reasonable.
