= Eun-Ah Kim =

Korean-American physicist

- Born: 1975 (age 50–51); Jeonju
- Education: University of Illinois at Urbana-Champaign
- Scientific career
- Fields: condensed matter physics
- Workplaces: Cornell University
- Thesis: Quantum Hall Tunnel Junctions: Luttinger Liquid Physics, Quantum Coherence Effect and Fractional Quantum Numbers (2005)
- Doctoral advisor: Eduardo Fradkin
- Website: https://physics.cornell.edu/eun-ah-kim

Eun-Ah Kim (born 1975) is an American condensed matter physicist interested in high-temperature superconductivity, topological order, strange metals, and the use of neural network based machine learning to recognize patterns in these systems. She is a professor of physics at Cornell University.

== Education and career ==
Kim was born in Jeonju in 1975. She graduated from Seoul National University in 1998 with a bachelor's degree in physics, and earned a master's degree there in 2000. She completed her Ph.D. in 2005 at the University of Illinois at Urbana-Champaign. Her dissertation, Quantum Hall Tunnel Junctions: Luttinger Liquid Physics, Quantum Coherence Effect and Fractional Quantum Numbers, was supervised by Eduardo Fradkin.

After postdoctoral research at Stanford University, Kim joined the Cornell University faculty in 2008, and was promoted to full professor in 2019.

== Recognition ==
In 2020, Kim was elected as a Fellow of the American Physical Society (APS), after a nomination from the APS Division of Condensed Matter Physics, "for broad contributions to theoretical condensed matter physics, including new conceptual frameworks for interpreting experiments". In 2022 she was awarded a Simons Fellowship.
