= List of honorary fellows of Hertford College, Oxford =

This is a list of Honorary Fellows of Hertford College, Oxford.

- Helen Alexander, studied Geography at Hertford, matriculating in 1975, honorary fellow from 2002–2018.
- John Baring, 7th Baron Ashburton
- Hagan Bayley, professor of chemical biology, honorary fellow from 2025.
- Marian Bell, consultant economist, studied PPE at Hertford, matriculating in 1977, honorary fellow from 2024.
- Sir Walter Bodmer
- Martin Bridson
- Nancee Oku Bright
- Ian Brownlie
- Rupert Bruce-Mitford
- Gilbert Campion, 1st Baron Campion
- Sir Sherard Cowper-Coles
- David Daniell
- Kay Davies, professor of anatomy, honorary fellow from 2025.
- John Dewar
- Hedley Donovan
- J. Meade Falkner, honorary fellow from 1927 to 1932.
- Richard W. Fisher
- Tom Fletcher
- R.F. Foster
- Peter Ganz
- Sir David Goldberg
- Andrew Goudie
- Drue Heinz
- Nicholas Henderson
- Jeremy Heywood, Baron Heywood of Whitehall
- Charlotte Hogg
- Will Hutton
- Sir Nicholas Jackson
- Jeffrey John
- Sir Jeffrey Jowell
- Soweto Kinch
- John Landers
- Paul Langford
- Paul Manduca
- Ronald Martland
- Stephen Massey, Baron Massey of Hampstead, financier and politician, studied PPE at Hertford, honorary fellow from 2025.
- Thomas McMahon, bishop of Brentwood, honorary fellow from 2004 to 2025.
- James Meade
- Roland Michener
- Roderich Moessner
- Paul Muldoon
- David Pannick, Baron Pannick
- Sir Bruce Pattullo
- Laline Paull, author, playwright and screenwriter, studied English at Hertford, matriculated 1983, honorary fellow from 2024.
- Hugh Cecil, 1st Baron Quickswood
- Ros Rickaby, professor of biogeochemistry, honorary fellow from 2025.
- Kim Stanley Robinson, science fiction writer, honorary fellow from 2025.
- Mary Robinson
- Jacqui Smith
- Hugh Springer
- Robert Stopford
- David Waddington, Baron Waddington
- Mary Warnock, Baroness Warnock
- Stephanie West
- Sir Roger Wheeler
- Byron White
- Sir John Whitehead
- Henry Williams
- Tobias Wolff
- Sir Christopher Zeeman

== See also ==
- Category:Alumni of Hertford College, Oxford
- Category:Fellows of Hertford College, Oxford
