= Erica Carlson =

American physicist

Erica W. Carlson
- Education: California Institute of Technology; University of California, Los Angeles
- Scientific career
- Fields: Condensed matter physics
- Workplaces: Purdue University
- Thesis: Phase ordering and stripes in strongly correlated superconductors (2000)
- Academic advisors: Steven A. Kivelson

Erica W. Carlson is an American physicist specializing in superconductors, liquid crystals, and strongly correlated materials. She is 150th Anniversary Professor of Physics and Astronomy at Purdue University. As well as for her research, she is known for her work in physics education for quantum physics, and for her introduction of innovative technologies including podcasts and wikis into her physics teaching. She is working on developing quantum materials which can help future technological processes in the medicinal, computing, construction, and engineering fields.

== Education and career ==
Carlson is a 1994 graduate of the California Institute of Technology. She went to the University of California, Los Angeles for graduate study, earning a master's degree in 1995 and completing her Ph.D. in 2000.

After postdoctoral research at Boston University, she joined the Purdue faculty in 2003. In 2023, she created a YouTube channel, titled The Quantum Age. On her channel, she discusses many properties of quantum mechanics and quantum materials. The channel is targeted toward upper middle school and high school students.

== Honors ==
Carlson was selected for the Fulbright Scholar in 2020. She also received the honor of Murphy Outstanding Undergrad Teaching Award in 2016.

== Recognition ==
Carlson was named a Fellow of the American Physical Society (APS) in 2015, after a nomination from the APS Division of Condensed Matter Physics, "for theoretical insights into the critical role of electron nematicity, disorder, and noise in novel phases of strongly correlated electron systems and predicting unique characteristics". Purdue University named her as a 150th Anniversary Professor in 2018.

== Personal life ==
Carlson is Christian, and has spoken publicly about combining her religious faith with science. She also is an advisor for the Cru and Ratio Christi where she speaks about the correlation of science and Christianity.
