= Institute for Condensed Matter Theory =

Research institute at the University of Illinois

The Institute for Condensed Matter Theory (ICMT) is an institute for the research of condensed matter theory hosted by and located at the University of Illinois at Urbana-Champaign.

ICMT was founded in 2007. The first director of the institute was Paul Goldbart who was followed by Eduardo Fradkin. The chief scientist is Nobel laureate Anthony Leggett.
