= Vedika Khemani =

Indian-American theoretical physicist (born 1988)

- Born: 1988; India
- Education: Princeton University; Harvey Mudd College; La Martiniere Calcutta
- Scientific career
- Thesis: Quantum order, entanglement and localization in many body systems. (2016)
- Doctoral advisor: Shivaji Sondhi

Vedika Khemani (born 1988) is a theoretical physicist and Associate Professor at Stanford University. Her research lies at the intersection of many-body quantum condensed matter physics and quantum information theory.

== Early life and education ==
Khemani was born in India and was educated through high-school at La Martiniere Calcutta. She moved to the United States to study physics at Harvey Mudd College, where she completed a senior thesis on gravitational holography. Her undergraduate thesis was awarded the Thomas Benjamin Brown Memorial Award. Alongside her physics courses, Khemani completed courses in mathematics, computer science, economics, linguistics and creative writing. She also took part in robotics programs and competed at national robotics competitions.

After completing her undergraduate degree in 2010, she went on to graduate studies at Princeton University. There, she worked with doctoral advisor Shivaji Sondhi. Following her PhD studies, Khemani was a Junior Fellow in Harvard Society of Fellows.

== Research and career ==
Khemani's research focuses on non-equilibrium many-body quantum dynamics. As part of her doctoral research, Khemani identified a novel non-equilibrium phase of matter known as a Floquet time-crystal. Such crystals demonstrate spontaneous breaking of time translation symmetry. In conventional crystals, atoms are arranged in regular and ordered patterns, whereas in time crystals they are arranged in both space and time.

As a current Associate Professor in Physics at Stanford University, Khemani has served as an Executive Committee member at the Stanford Quantum Science and Engineering Initiative (Q-FARM) since 2022.

== Awards and honours ==
- 2025 U.S. Department of Energy Presidential Early Career Award for Scientists and Engineers (PECASE)
- 2025 University of Maryland Richard E. Prange Prize and Lectureship in Condensed Matter Theory and Related Areas
- 2024 Infosys Prize in Physical Sciences
- 2023 Office of Naval Research Young Investigator Award
- 2022 Breakthrough New Horizons in Physics Prize
- 2020 Department of Physics at the University of Illinois McMillan Award
- 2020 American Physical Society George E. Valley Jr. Prize
- 2020 United States Department of Energy Early Career Award
- 2020 Sloan Research Fellowship

== Select publications ==
- Khemani, Vedika; Lazarides, Achilleas; Moessner, Roderich; Sondhi, S. L. (2016-06-21). "Phase Structure of Driven Quantum Systems". Physical Review Letters. 116 (25) 250401. arXiv:1508.03344. Bibcode:2016PhRvL.116y0401K. doi:10.1103/PhysRevLett.116.250401. PMID 27391704.
- Mi, Xiao; Ippoliti, Matteo...; Khemani, Vedika; Roushan, Pedram (2022). "Time-crystalline eigenstate order on a quantum processor". Nature. 601 (7894): 531–536. doi:10.1038/s41586-021-04257-w. PMC 8791837.
- Choi, Jae-yoon; Hild, Sebastian; Zeiher, Johannes; Schauß, Peter; Rubio-Abadal, Antonio; Yefsah, Tarik; Khemani, Vedika; Huse, David A.; Bloch, Immanuel; Gross, Christian (2016-06-24). "Exploring the many-body localization transition in two dimensions". Science. 352 (6293): 1547–1552. arXiv:1604.04178. Bibcode:2016Sci...352.1547C. doi:10.1126/science.aaf8834. ISSN 0036-8075. PMID 27339981. S2CID 35012132.
- Choi, Soonwon; Choi, Joonhee; Landig, Renate; Kucsko, Georg; Zhou, Hengyun; Isoya, Junichi; Jelezko, Fedor; Onoda, Shinobu; Sumiya, Hitoshi; Khemani, Vedika; von Keyserlingk, Curt (2017). "Observation of discrete time-crystalline order in a disordered dipolar many-body system". Nature. 543 (7644): 221–225. arXiv:1610.08057. Bibcode:2017Natur.543..221C. doi:10.1038/nature21426. ISSN 1476-4687. PMC 5349499. PMID 28277511.

== Personal life and education ==
In 2013 Khemani married David Coats, whom she met at Harvey Mudd College.
