= Paul Goldbart =

British physicist, born 1960

Paul M. Goldbart
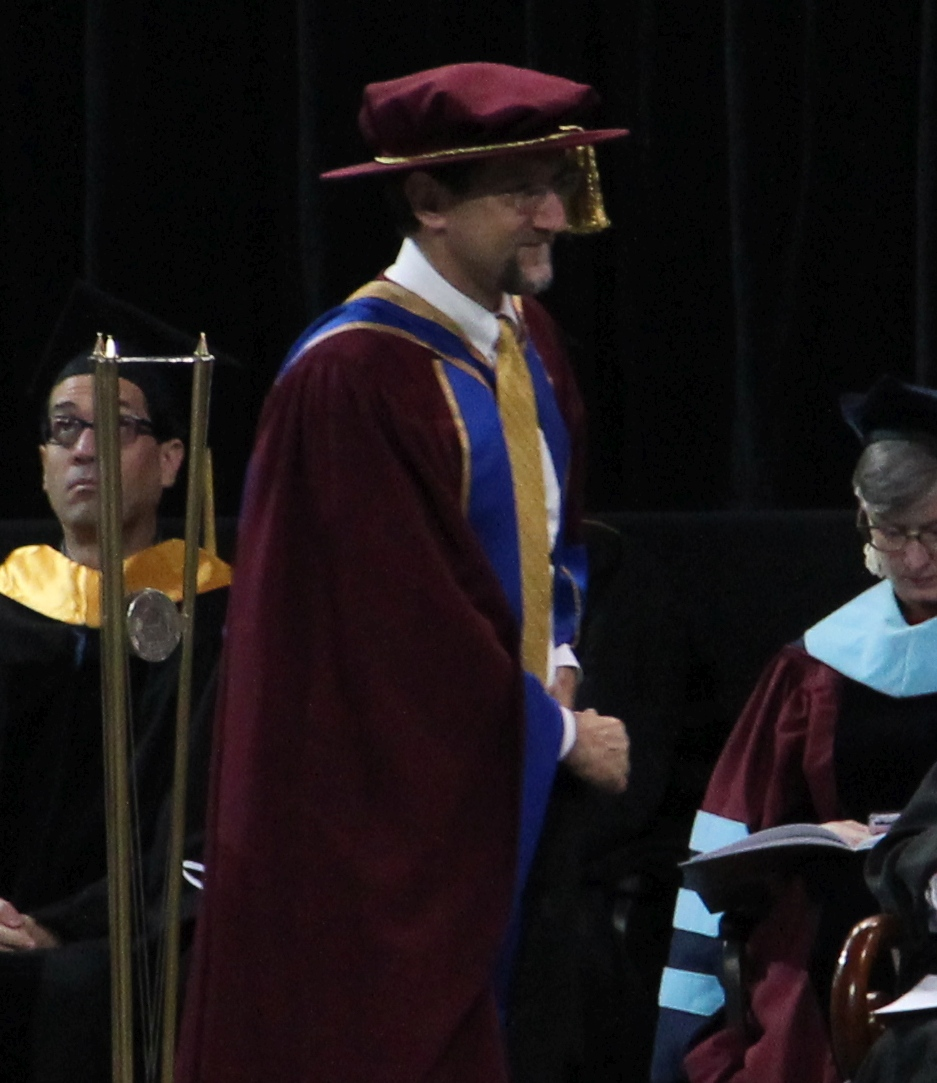
- Goldbart in 2016
- Born: August 1960 (age 66); Barnet, Hertfordshire, England
- Scientific career
- Workplaces: University of Texas at Austin Stony Brook University
- Doctoral advisor: David Sherrington
- Doctoral students: Xiaoming Mao

Paul Mark Goldbart (born August 1960 in Barnet, Hertfordshire, England) is an English-American physicist and author, and was the first director of the Institute for Condensed Matter Theory at the University of Illinois at Urbana–Champaign. His research ranges widely over the field of condensed matter physics, including soft matter, disordered systems, nanoscience and superconductivity. Goldbart was provost of Stony Brook University from March 2021 until January 2022. Prior to that he had served as dean of the college of natural sciences at the University of Texas, Austin, Dean of the College of Sciences at the Georgia Institute of Technology, and as the director of the Institute for Condensed Matter Theory.

== Career ==
Goldbart earned his Ph.D. at Imperial College London in 1985 under Professor David Sherrington. Goldbart is a trustee of and the former Treasurer for the Aspen Center for Physics in Colorado.

He is a fellow of the Institute of Physics and the American Physical Society.

== Books ==
- M. Stone, P. Goldbart, "Mathematics for Physics: A guided Tour for Graduate Students" Cambridge University Press, 2009
- P. Goldbart, N. Goldenfeld, D. Sherrington, "Stealing the Gold: A Celebration of the Pioneering Physics of Sam Edwards (International Series of Monographs on Physics)" Oxford University Press, USA 2005
