= Kathryn Levin =

American physicist

Kathryn J. Levin
- Education: University of California, Berkeley; Harvard University
- Scientific career
- Workplaces: University of California, Irvine; University of Rochester; University of Chicago

Kathryn Levin is an American physicist who is Professor of Quantum Science at the University of Chicago. Levin works on high temperatures cuprates and the Bardeen-Cooper-Schrieffer – Bose–Einstein condensate crossover.

== Early life and education ==
Levin is the daughter of a physicist. She was an undergraduate student at the University of California, Berkeley, where she graduated top of the class of the College of Letters and Science. She completed her doctoral research at Harvard University, where she studied the transport and electronic properties of alloys. She completed two postdoctoral research positions, one at the University of Rochester and one at the University of California, Irvine.

== Research and career ==
Levin works in condensed matter theory, superconductivity and superfluidity. Her early work considered superfluid helium. In 1995, quantum coherent Bose–Einstein condensatess were demonstrated in trapped atoms, and Levin was amongst the first to recognize it could be used to create coherent pairs of fermionic atoms.

Levin works on cuprates and superconductors, and atomic gas superfluids.

Levin currently works at the James franck institute, which specialize's in the intersections of physics, chemistry and material science's.

Levin has trained about 25 PhD students and about 25 postdoctoral scholars during her continuing career.

== Recognition ==
Levin was named as a Fellow of the American Physical Society (APS) in 1991, after a nomination from the APS Division of Condensed Matter Physics, "for her contributions to our understanding of strongly interacting Fermion systems".

== Personal life ==
Levin is married with two children.

== Selected publications ==
- Joseph Kinast; Andrey Turlapov; John E. Thomas; Qijin Chen; Jelena Stajic; Kathryn Levin (27 January 2005). "Heat capacity of a strongly interacting Fermi gas". Science. 307 (5713): 1296–1299. arXiv:cond-mat/0502087. Bibcode:2005Sci...307.1296K. doi:10.1126/science.1109220. ISSN 0036-8075. PMID 15681340. Wikidata Q81340809.
- Assa Auerbach; K. Levin (1 August 1986). "Kondo bosons and the Kondo lattice: Microscopic basis for the heavy Fermi liquid". Physical Review Letters. 57 (7): 877–880. doi:10.1103/physrevlett.57.877. ISSN 0031-9007. PMID 10034184. Wikidata Q74476676.
- Si Q; Zha Y; Levin K; Jianping Lu (1 April 1993). "Comparison of spin dynamics in YBa2Cu3O7- delta and La2-xSrxCuO4: Effects of Fermi-surface geometry". Physical Review B. 47 (14): 9055–9076. doi:10.1103/physrevb.47.9055. ISSN 0163-1829. PMID 10004956. Wikidata Q74375640.
