= Khirbat al-Sawamir =

- Etymology: "Places of nocturnal entertainment"
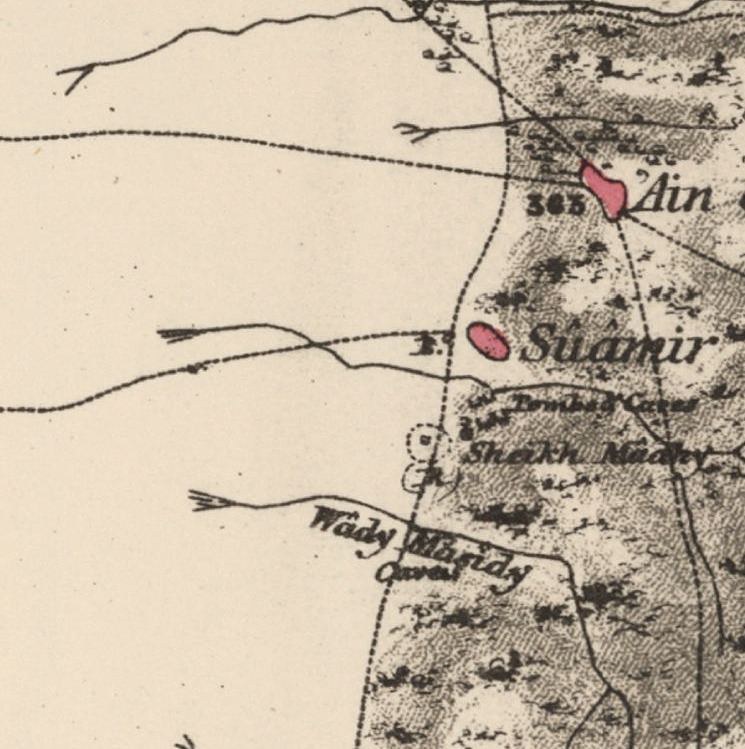
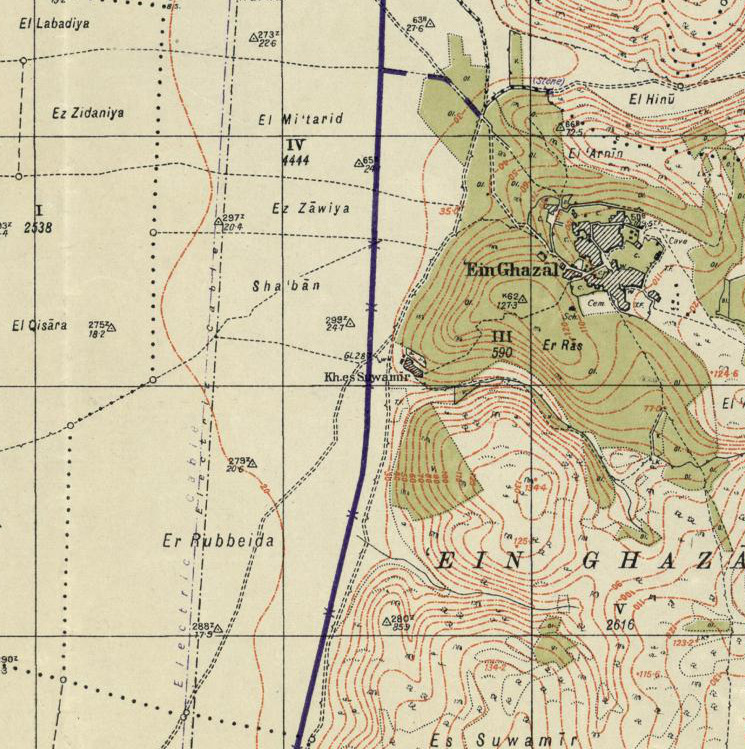
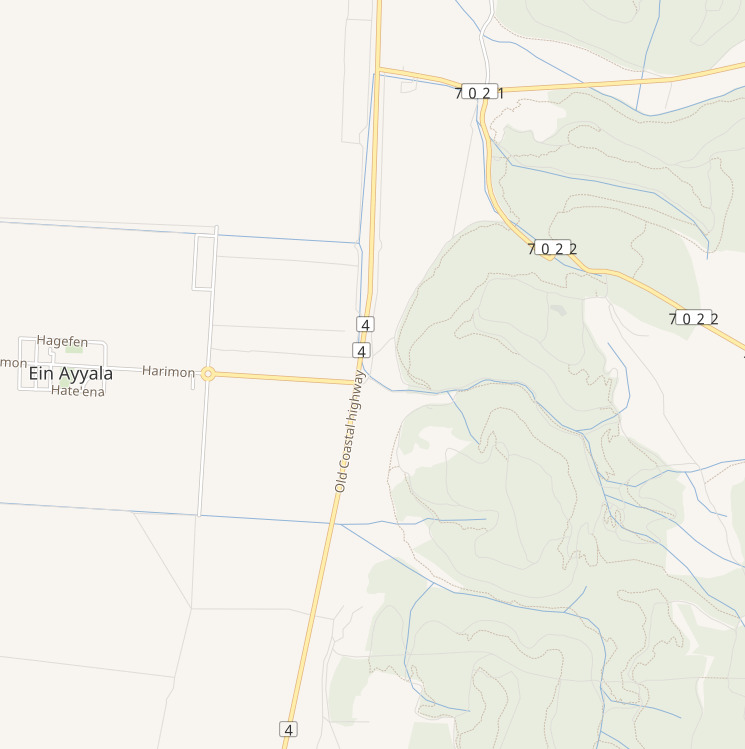
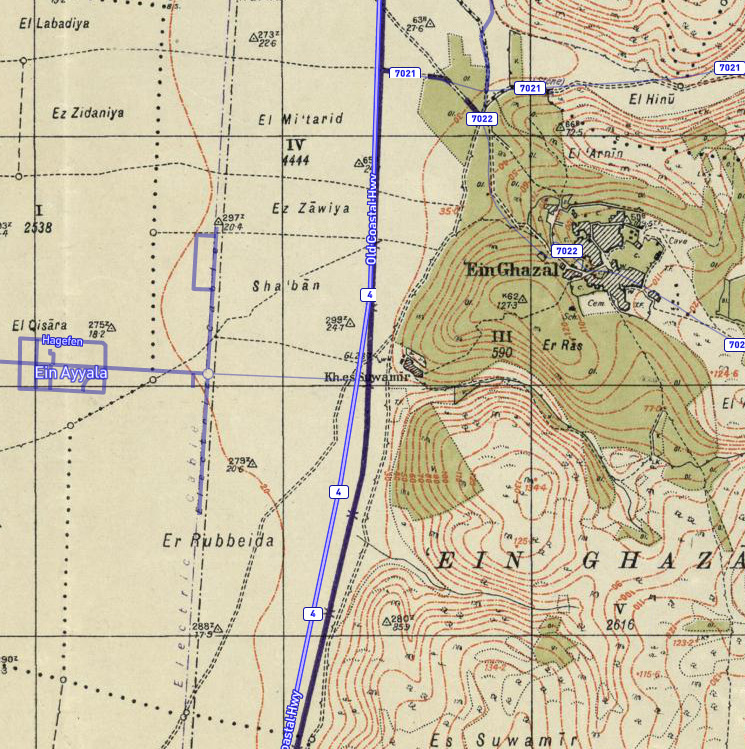
- 1870s map 1940s map modern map 1940s with modern overlay map A series of historical maps of the area around Khirbat al-Sawamir (click the buttons)

- Location within Mandatory Palestine
- Coordinates: 32°37′43″N 34°57′30″E
- Palestine grid: 146/226
- Geopolitical entity: Mandatory Palestine
- Subdistrict: Haifa
- Date of depopulation: May 22, 1948

Population (1931)
  - Total: 1,439 together with Ayn Ghazal
- Current Localities: Ofer

Khirbat al-Sawamir was a Palestinian Arab village in the Haifa Subdistrict. It was depopulated during the 1948 Arab-Israeli War on May 22, 1948. It was located 22 kilometres south of Haifa.

== History ==
Burial places cut into rock, and ceramics from the Byzantine era have been found at Khirbat al-Sawamir.

=== Ottoman era ===
Khirbat al-Sawamir was incorporated into the Ottoman Empire in 1517 with all of Palestine, and in 1596 it appeared in the tax registers under the name of Sawamir, as being in the nahiya ("subdistrict") of Ramla, which was under the administration of the liwa ("district") of Gaza. It had a population of 3 household, an estimated 17 persons, who were all Muslims. They paid a fixed tax-rate of 25 % on agricultural products, including wheat, barley, summer crops, goats and beehives, in addition to occasional revenues; a total of 5,500 akçe.

The village appeared, though misplaced, under the name of Sawama on the map that Pierre Jacotin compiled during Napoleon's invasion of 1799.

In 1859, the population was estimated to be 120 persons, with 15 feddans of cultivated area.

In 1882, the PEF's Survey of Western Palestine described Suamir as a small adobe village at the edge of the plain, with a well to the west.

In the early twentieth century, travelers noted that the village was better built that the usual Fellahin village.

=== British Mandate era ===
In the 1922 census of Palestine, conducted by the British Mandate authorities, Al Sawamer had a population of 17 Muslims. In the 1931 census, the population was counted with that of Ayn Ghazal, and together they had 1,439 Muslims in 247 houses. In the Village Statistics, 1945, the name of the village was not mentioned.

=== 1948, aftermath ===
Following the 1948 war the area was incorporated into the State of Israel. The moshav of Ofer was established in 1950 partly on the land of Khirbat al-Sawamir, and partly on the land of Ayn Ghazal.

In 1992 the village site was described: "The ruins of two walls (formerly parts of a building) are visible at the site, which has been fenced in with barbed wire. Pine trees occupy much of the land on the site, and pomegranate and fig trees and cactuses are scattered throughout. The surrounding coastal lands are used by Israeli farmers for growing vegetables and fruit, particularly bananas."

== Bibliography ==
- Barron, J. B., ed. (1923). Palestine: Report and General Abstracts of the Census of 1922. Government of Palestine.
- Conder, C.R.; Kitchener, H.H. (1882). The Survey of Western Palestine: Memoirs of the Topography, Orography, Hydrography, and Archaeology. Vol. 2. London: Committee of the Palestine Exploration Fund.
- Dauphin, C. (1998). La Palestine byzantine, Peuplement et Populations. BAR International Series 726 (in French). Vol. III : Catalogue. Oxford: Archeopress. ISBN 0-860549-05-4.
- Hütteroth, W.-D.; Abdulfattah, K. (1977). Historical Geography of Palestine, Transjordan and Southern Syria in the Late 16th Century. Erlanger Geographische Arbeiten, Sonderband 5. Erlangen, Germany: Vorstand der Fränkischen Geographischen Gesellschaft. ISBN 3-920405-41-2.
- Karmon, Y. (1960). "An Analysis of Jacotin's Map of Palestine" (PDF). Israel Exploration Journal. 10 (3, 4): 155–173, 244–253. Archived from the original (PDF) on 2019-12-22.
- Khalidi, W. (1992). All That Remains: The Palestinian Villages Occupied and Depopulated by Israel in 1948. Washington D.C.: Institute for Palestine Studies. ISBN 0-88728-224-5.
- Mills, E., ed. (1932). Census of Palestine 1931. Population of Villages, Towns and Administrative Areas. Jerusalem: Government of Palestine.
- Mülinen, Egbert Friedrich von 1908, Beiträge zur Kenntnis des Karmels "Separateabdruck aus der Zeitschrift des Deutschen Palëstina-Vereins Band XXX (1907) Seite 117-207 und Band XXXI (1908) Seite 1-258."
- Palmer, E.H. (1881). The Survey of Western Palestine: Arabic and English Name Lists Collected During the Survey by Lieutenants Conder and Kitchener, R. E. Transliterated and Explained by E.H. Palmer. Committee of the Palestine Exploration Fund.
