= History of the Jews in the Czech lands =

Czech Jews, Bohemian Jews, Moravian Jews
Židé v Českých zemích Juden der böhmischen Länder (יהדות בוהמיה (צ'כיה בעמישע יידן
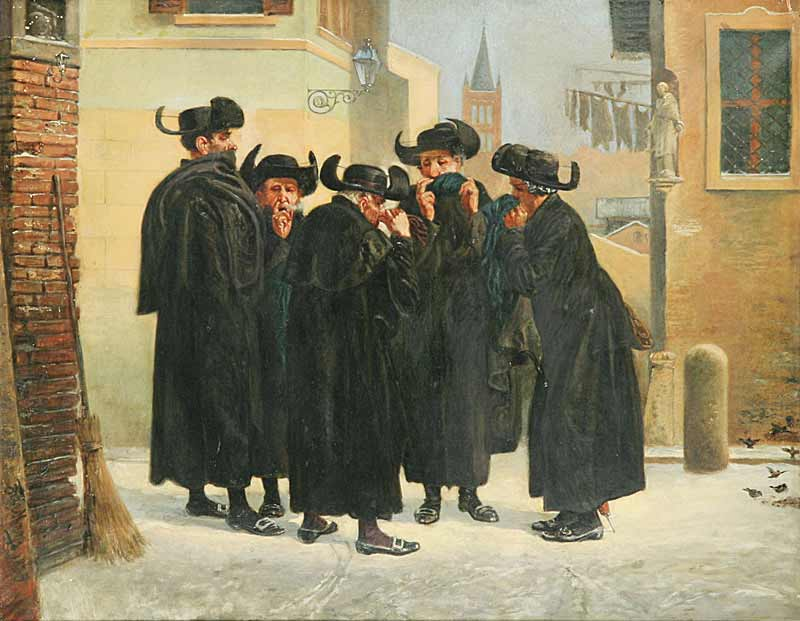
- Jews taking snuff in Prague, painting by Mírohorský, 1885

Total population
- 2,349

Regions with significant populations

Languages
- Czech, German, Yiddish, Hebrew, Judeo-Czech

Religion
- Judaism, Frankism, Jewish Brotherhoods

Related ethnic groups
- Jews, Ashkenazi Jews, Slovak Jews, Austrian Jews, German Jews, Hungarian Jews, Ukrainian Jews

Historical local Jewish population
Year	Pop.	±%
1921	35,699	—
1930	37,093	+3.9%
1991	218	−99.4%
2011	521	+139.0%
2021	2,349	+350.9%

The history of the Jews in the Czech lands, historically the Lands of the Bohemian Crown, including the modern Czech Republic (i.e. Bohemia, Moravia, and the southeast or Czech Silesia), goes back at least 1,100 years. There is evidence that Jews have lived in Moravia and Bohemia since as early as the 10th century. Jewish communities flourished here specifically in the 13th, 16th, 17th centuries, and again in the late 19th and early 20th centuries. Local Jews were mostly murdered in the Holocaust, or exiled at various points. As of 2021, there were only about 3,000 Jews officially registered in the Czech Republic, albeit the actual number is probably as much as ten times higher.

Jewish people constituted a minority group in the Czech lands. Their population fluctuated depending on the beliefs of the monarch. During the reigns of Přemysl Otakar II and Rudolf II, they were able to prosper, but also experienced exile under Maria Theresa and pogroms under Charles IV. The Jewish population improved during the Enlightenment, when Joseph II reigned, and in the 19th century, they gained equal rights and began assimilating with the majority. During World War II, the Nazis — who occupied part of Czechoslovakia — began the Holocaust, leading to the death of 80,000 Czech, Moravian and Silesian Jews. Under the Communist Party, their population dwindled, and they now make up only a fraction of their numbers after the Velvet Revolution.

== Jewish Prague ==
Jews are believed to have settled in Prague as early as the 10th century. The 16th century was a "golden age" for Jewry in Prague. The city was called the "Mother of Israel" or "Jerusalem upon Vltava." One of the famous Jewish scholars of the time was Judah Loew ben Bezalel, known as the Maharal, who served as a leading rabbi in Prague for most of his life. He is buried at the Old Jewish Cemetery in Josefov, and his grave, with its tombstone intact, can still be visited. According to a popular legend, the body of Golem (created by the Maharal) lies in the attic of the Old New Synagogue where the genizah of Prague's community is kept. In 1708, Jews accounted for one-quarter of Prague's population. Both religiously and demographically, Prague's Jewry has had strong ties to the Jewish communities of Regensburg, Venice, Vienna, Kraków, as well as The Holy Land.

== Austro-Hungarian Empire ==
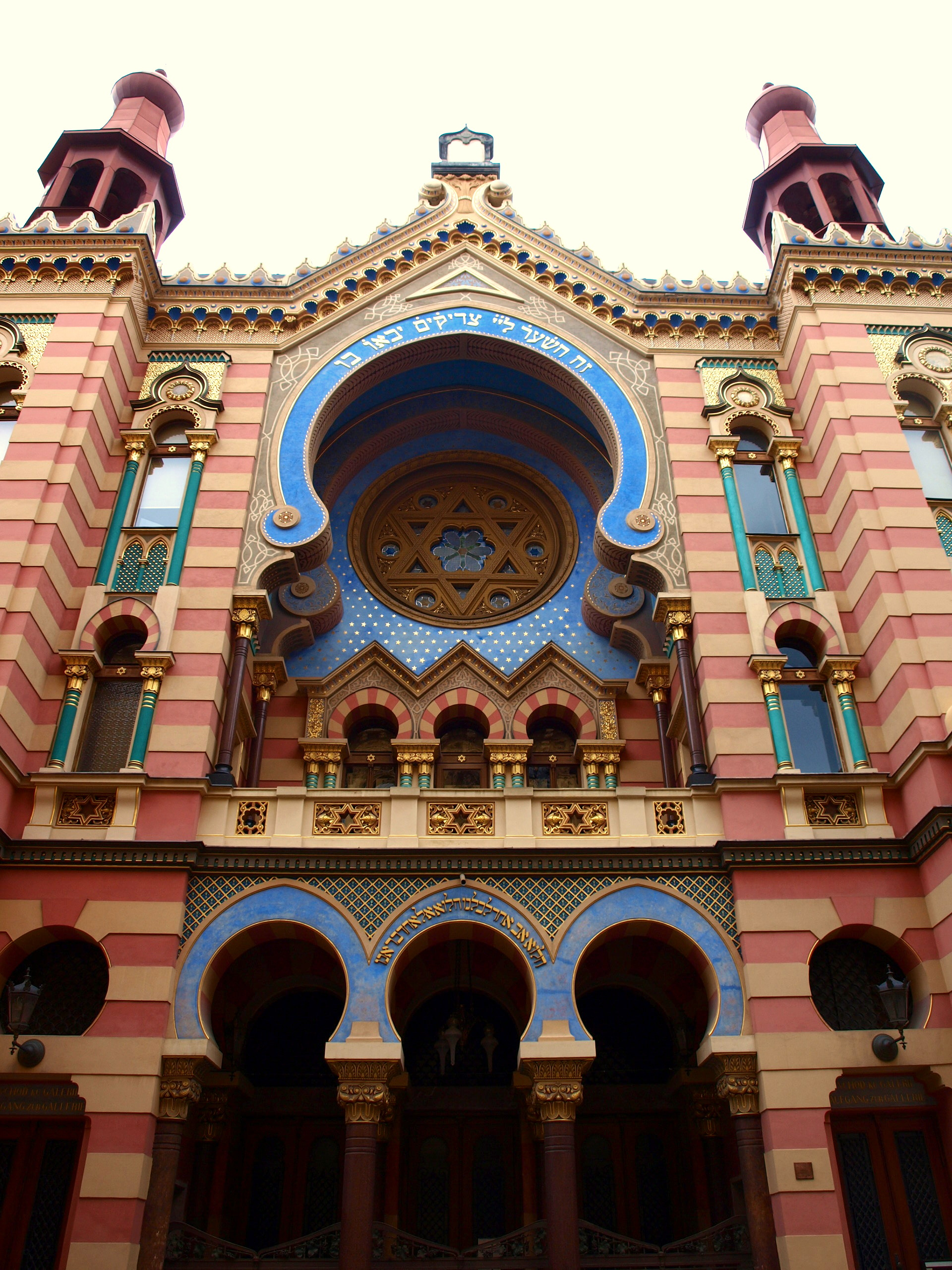
The Jubilee Synagogue was built between 1898 and 1906, named to mark the 50th anniversary (jubilee) of the HIM Franz Joseph I of Austria

As part of interwar Czechoslovakia, and before that the Austro-Hungarian Empire, the Jews had a long association with this part of Europe. Throughout the last thousand years, more than 600 Jewish communities have emerged in the Kingdom of Bohemia, including Moravia. According to the 1930 census, Czechoslovakia, including Subcarpathian Ruthenia, had a Jewish population of 356,830.

== First Czechoslovak Republic ==
During the 1890s, most Jews were German-speaking and considered themselves Germans. By the 1930s, German-speaking Jews had been numerically overtaken by Czech-speaking Jews; Zionism also made inroads among the Jews of the periphery (Moravia and the Sudetenland). In the late 19th and early 20th centuries, thousands of Jews came to Prague from small villages and towns in Bohemia, leading to the urbanization of Bohemian Jewish society. Of the 10 million inhabitants of pre-1938 Bohemia and Moravia, Jews composed only about 1% (117,551). Most Jews lived in large cities such as Prague (35,403 Jews, who made up 4.2% of the population), Brno (11,103, 4.2%), Ostrava (6,865, 5.5%), Teplice (3,213, 11%)) and Pilsen (2,773, 2%).

Antisemitism in the Czech lands was less prevalent than elsewhere, and was strongly opposed by the national founder and first president, Tomáš Garrigue Masaryk (1850–1937), while secularism among both Jews and non-Jews facilitated integration. Nevertheless, there had been anti-Jewish rioting during the birth of the Czechoslovak Republic in 1918 and 1920. Following a steep decline in religious observance in the 19th century, most Bohemian Jews were ambivalent to religion, although this was less true in Moravia. The Jews of Bohemia had the highest rate of intermarriage in Europe: 43.8% married out of the faith, compared to 30% in Moravia.

== The Holocaust ==
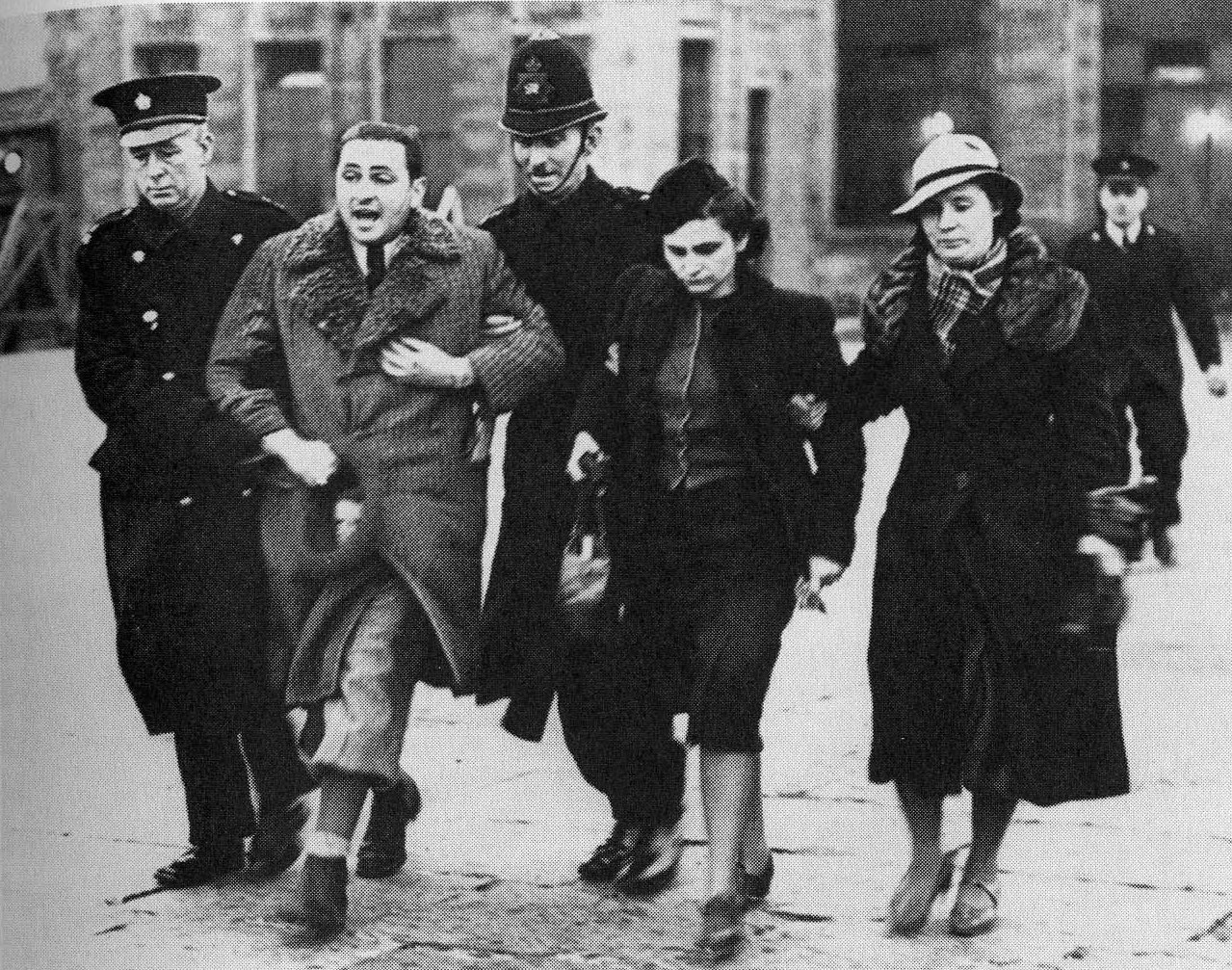
Jewish refugees from Czechoslovakia are deported from Croydon airport, England, on 31 March 1939.

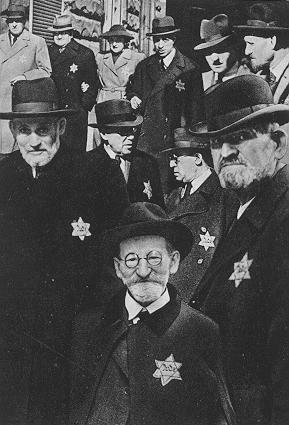
Jews wearing yellow badges in Prague, c. 1942

In contrast to Slovak Jews, who were mostly deported by the First Slovak Republic directly to Auschwitz, Treblinka, and other extermination camps, most Czech Jews were initially deported by the German occupiers with the help of local Czech Nazi collaborators to the Theresienstadt concentration camp and later killed. However, some Czech Jewish children were rescued by Kindertransport and escaped to the United Kingdom and other Allied countries. Some were reunited with their families after the war, while many lost parents and relatives to the concentration camps.

It is estimated that of the 118,310 Jews living in the Protectorate of Bohemia and Moravia upon the German invasion in 1939, 26,000 emigrated legally and illegally; 80,000 were murdered by the Nazis; and 10,000 survived the concentration camps.

== Today ==
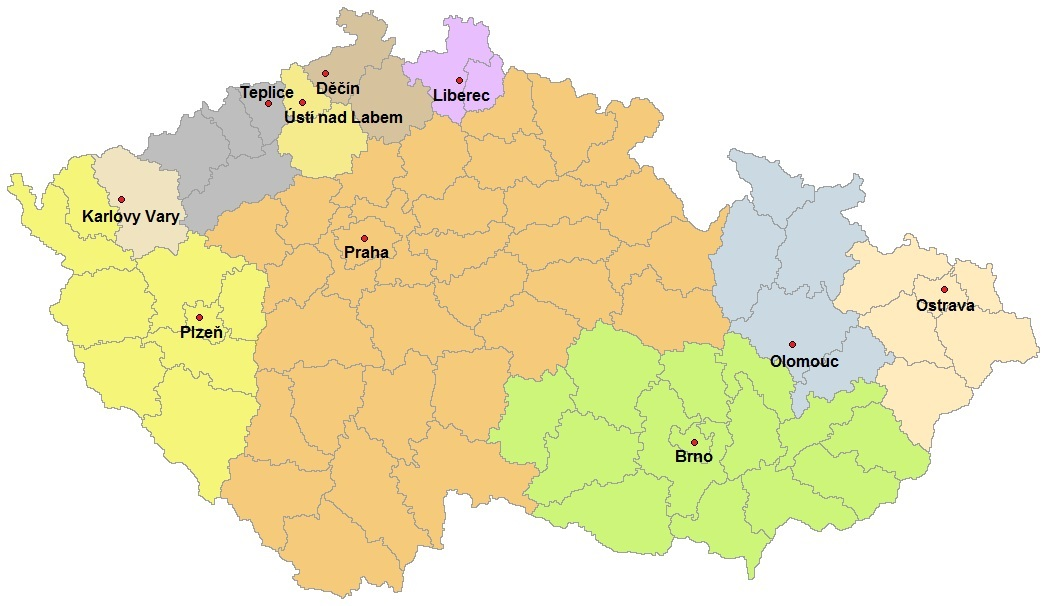
Jewish communities associated under the Federation of Jewish communities and their administration within the Czech Republic, 2008

Prague has the most vibrant Jewish community in the entire country. Several synagogues operate on a regular daily basis (including the famous Old-New Synagogue, the oldest active synagogue of the world, and the two late 19th century emancipation synagogues, the Spanish Synagogue and the Jerusalem Synagogue, both active places of worship); there are three kindergartens, a Jewish day school, two retirement homes, five kosher restaurants, two mikvot, and a kosher hotel. Three different Jewish magazines are issued every month, and the Prague Jewish community officially has about 1,500 members, but the real number of Jews in the city is estimated to be much higher, between 7,000 and 15,000. Due to years of persecution by both the Nazis and the subsequent Stalinist regime of Klement Gottwald, however, most people do not feel comfortable being registered as such. In addition, the Czech Republic is one of the most secularized and atheistic countries in Europe.

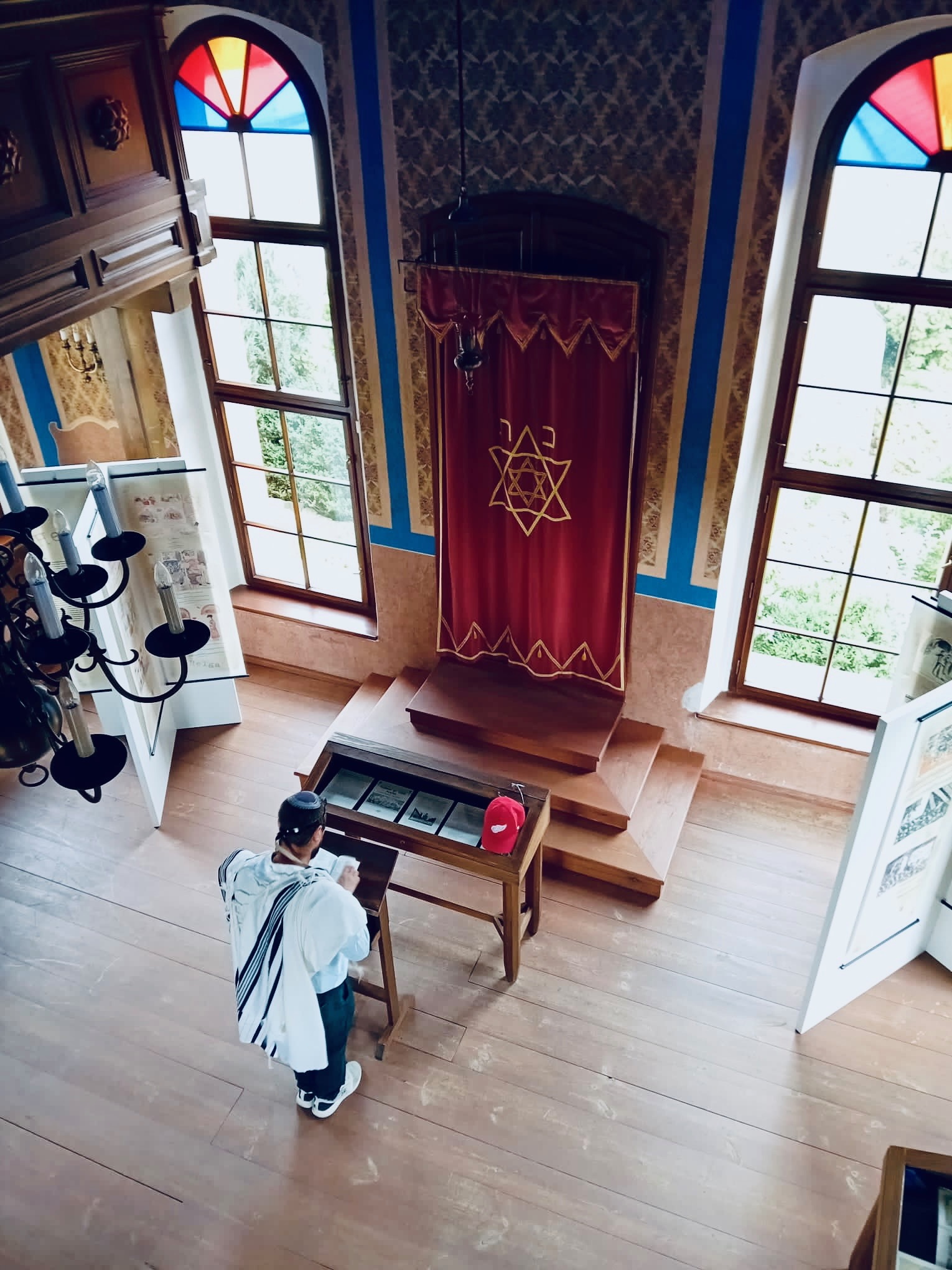
A weekday morning shacharit prayer of a local religious Jew donning on tefillin and tallit in the Úštěk Synagogue, 2023

There are ten smaller Jewish communities around the country (seven in Bohemia, two in Moravia and two in Silesia. The largest one being in Prague, where close to 90% of all Czech Jews live. The umbrella organisation for Jewish communities and organisations in the country is the Federation of Jewish Communities (Federace židovských obcí, FŽO). Services are regularly held in Prague, Brno, Olomouc, Plzeň, Teplice, Liberec, Karlovy Vary, Děčín and Krnov and irregularly in some other cities, for example Ostrava, Úštěk, Ústí nad Labem or Mikulov.

There are several kosher restaurants in Prague, and since 2014, the only kosher hotel in Central Europe.

In late January 2024, two youths attempted to set fire to the Agudas Achim synagogue in Brno using an improvised incendiary device, an act that police investigated as a hate-motivated and terror-linked offence. One of the accused was later charged with attempted arson and other violent crimes, including attempted murder, and the case was brought before the Regional Court in Brno. Police uncovered the plot during an investigation into a group spreading extremist content online and promoting terrorist organisations.

== See also ==
- Czech Republic–Israel relations
- History of the Jews in Czechoslovakia
- List of Czech and Slovak Jews
- History of the Jews in Slovakia
- History of the Jews in Carpathian Ruthenia
- Ethnic minorities in Czechoslovakia

== Sources ==
- Čapková, Kateřina (2012). Czechs, Germans, Jews?: National Identity and the Jews of Bohemia. New York: Berghahn Books. ISBN 978-0-85745-475-1.
- Gruner, Wolf (2015). "Protectorate of Bohemia and Moravia". In Gruner, Wolf; Osterloh, Jörg (eds.). The Greater German Reich and the Jews: Nazi Persecution Policies in the Annexed Territories 1935-1945. War and Genocide. Translated by Heise, Bernard. New York: Berghahn Books. pp. 99–135. ISBN 978-1-78238-444-1.
- Rothkirchen, Livia (2006). The Jews of Bohemia and Moravia: Facing the Holocaust. Lincoln: University of Nebraska Press. ISBN 978-0803205024.
