= Liběšice =

Liběšice may refer to places in the Czech Republic:

- Liběšice (Litoměřice District), a municipality and village in the Ústí nad Labem Region
- Liběšice (Louny District), a municipality and village in the Ústí nad Labem Region
- Liběšice, a village and part of Češov in the Hradec Králové Region
- Liběšice, a village and part of Želenice (Most District) in the Ústí nad Labem Region
