= Kajetán Vogl =

Czech composer (c. 1750 – 1794)

Kajetán Vogl (c. 1750 – 27 August 1794) was a Czech composer and priest of the Servite Order.

== Life and career ==
Kajetán Vogl was born in Konojedy, Bohemia (now part of Úštěk, Czech Republic), and attended the Jesuit seminary in Breslau (now Wrocław, Poland), where he was an alto singer. After completing his humanities studies, Vogl went to Prague and joined the Servite Order, later being ordained as a priest. In Prague, he studied counterpoint and composition under František Václav Habermann but later stopped and studied from the scores of Mysliveček, Haydn, and Zimmermann. He also took lessons from the violinist Franz Anton Ernst.

Vogl was music director of the Church of Saint Michael the Archangel. After the dissolution of the Servite Order in Bohemia he became a preacher at the Holy Trinity Church in Prague (now on Spálená street), a position he held until his death.

== Works ==
Among Vogl's works are 26 masses, 12 Stationes theophoricae, two violin concertos, four horn concertos, one each for flute, oboe, and clarinet, six quartets with piano accompaniment, six string quartets, and an opera in German entitled Durchmarsch. His works are organized by the WeiVO catalog.
