= Franz Johann Habermann =

Czech composer

Franz Johann (or Wenzel) Habermann (20 September 1706 – 7 April 1783), also known by his Czech name František Václav Habermann, was a Czech composer and musician.

== Biography ==
Habermann was born in Königswart (Lázně Kynžvart) in 1706. His Christian name cannot be verified, but his Op. 1 gives Franciscus. He had two brothers (Anton and Karl) and received his education in Klattau (Klatovy). He studied music in Italy and was active in Spain and France. Habermann was made maître de chapelle to the Prince of Condé in Paris in 1731, then became maestro di cappella in service of the Grand Duke of Tuscany in Florence in 1740.

Returning to Bohemia on the occasion of the coronation of Maria Theresa in Prague, the composer was commissioned to write an opera for her. Conducting for two churches in Prague, he also had many pupils, including Josef Mysliveček, František Xaver Dušek, and Kajetán Vogl. His son, Franz Johann II, was born in 1750 and received music education from him. In 1773, Habermann went to Eger (Cheb) as music director of a deanery. Habermann died in 1783, aged 77.

== Works ==
Among his published compositions are twelve masses (Prague, 1746) and six litanies (Prague, 1747). Another collection of six masses titled Philomela pia was published in 1747, being known outside of Bohemia. Most of his compositions, which include his early music before Habermann's return and other sacred works, have not survived or cannot be proven to be his. George Frideric Handel borrowed from some of Habermann's works. He composed more music, including other sacred music, several oratorios, symphonies, sonatas, however they remained in manuscript.

Other compositions also include the Easter oratorios (performed in Prague), the opéra comique for Maria Theresa (12 May 1743; lost), and a play for Maria Theresa (Prague, 1754).
