= Úštěk Synagogue =

Former synagogue in Ústěk, Czech Republic

- Czech: Synagoga v Úštěku
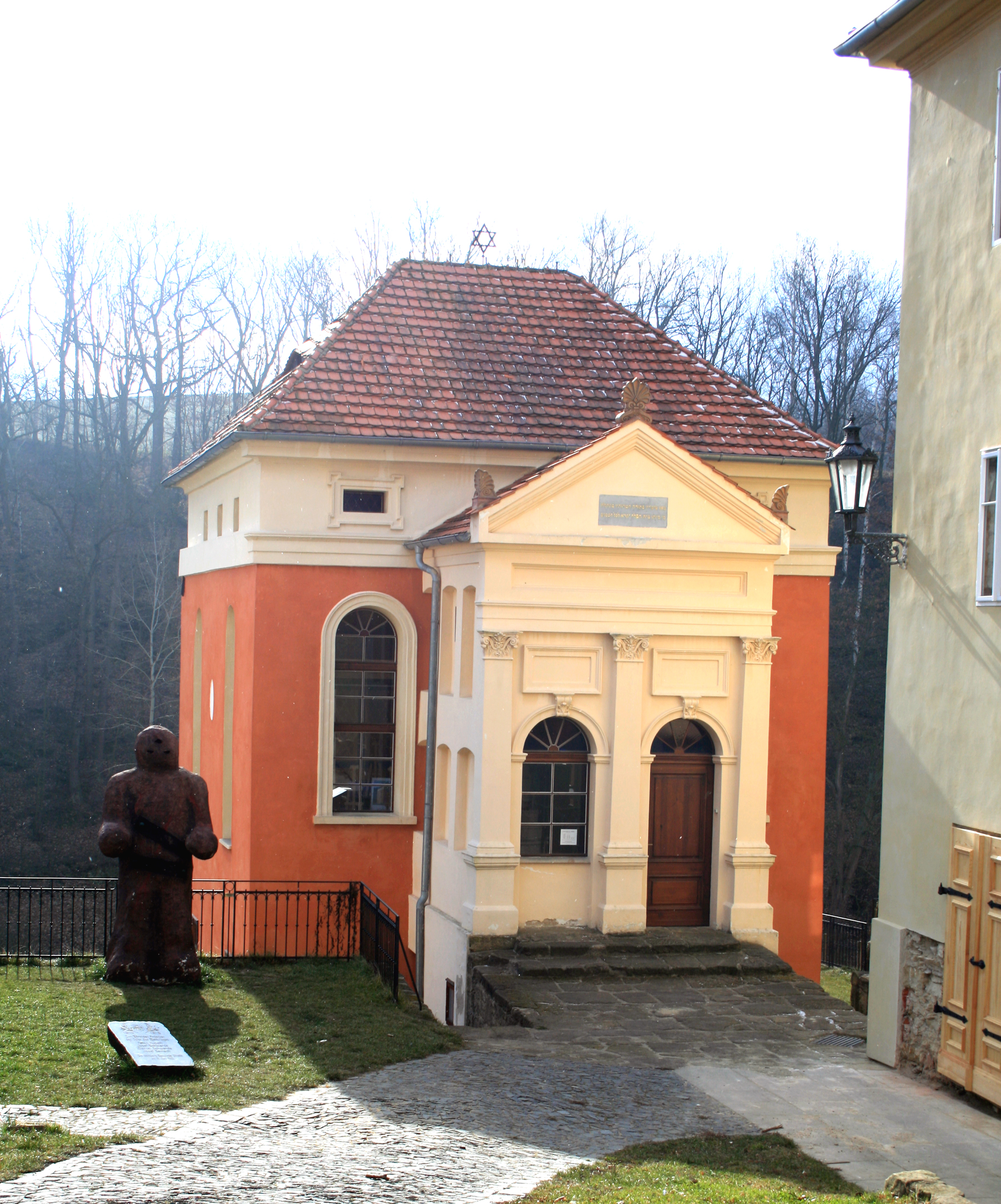
- The former synagogue, now museum, with a statue of Golem

- Location of the former synagogue, now museum, in the Czech Republic

Religion
- Affiliation: Judaism (former)
- Ecclesiastical or organisational status: Synagogue (18th-century–1940); Jewish museum (since 2014)
- Status: Closed (as a synagogue); Repurposed

Location
- Location: Úštěk, Litoměřice District, Ústí nad Labem Region
- Country: Czech Republic
- Coordinates: 50°35′02″N 14°20′19″E

Architecture
- Type: Synagogue architecture
- Style: Baroque
- Completed: c. 1790s
- Materials: Sandstone

Úštěk Synagogue (Czech: Synagoga v Úštěku, German: Die Synagoge in Auscha, Hebrew: בית הכנסת אושה) is an 18th-century Jewish synagogue, located in the town of Úštěk, in the Litoměřice District of the Ústí nad Labem Region, in the Czech Republic. The building has been spared of near complete collapse after 1989 and eventually restored to its original baroque appearance. It has served as the region's Jewish museum since 2014, as well as an active place of worship of the tiny local Jewish community.

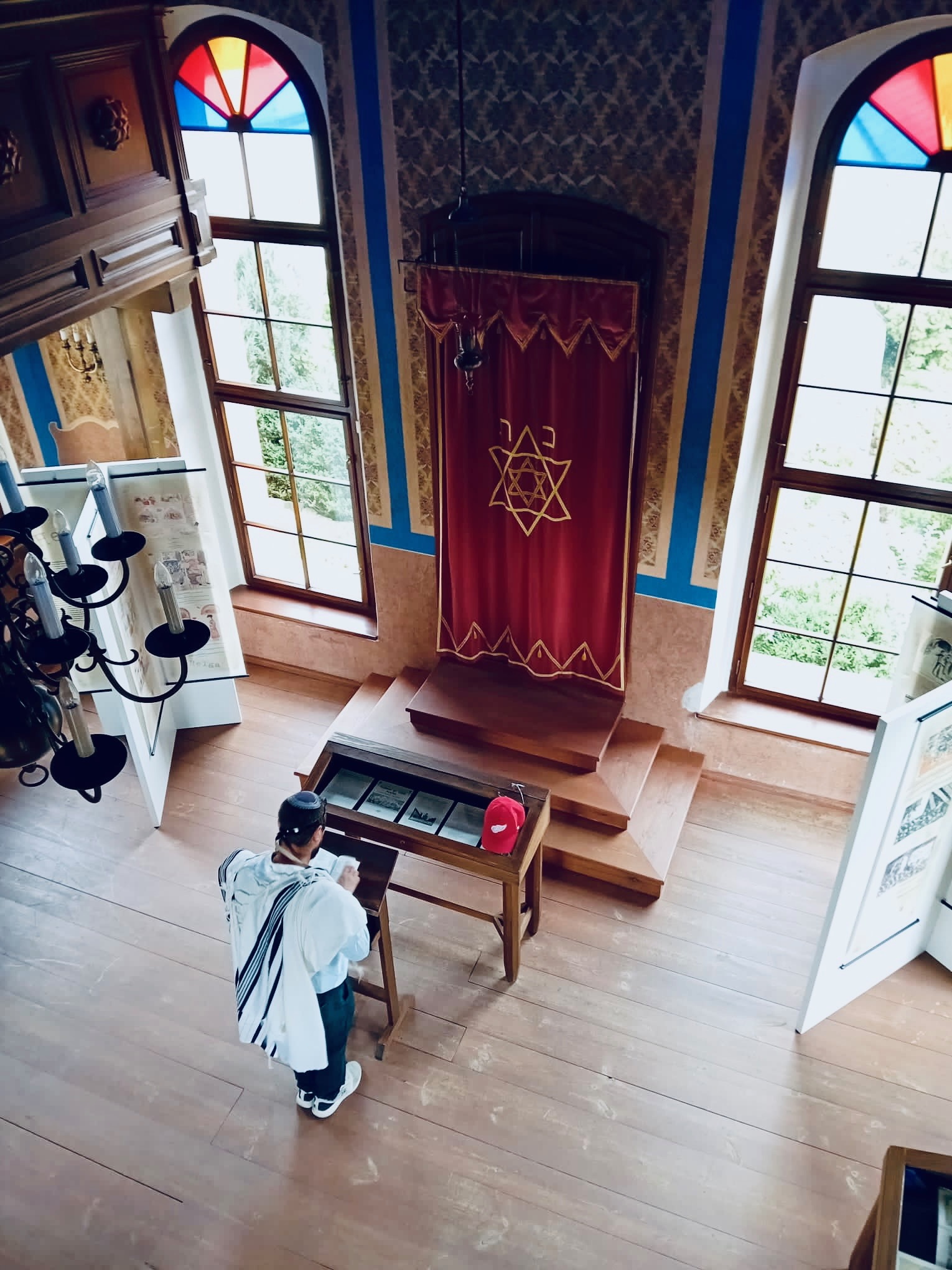
A weekday morning shacharit prayer of a local religious Jew donning on tefillin and tallit in the Úštěk Synagogue, 2023.

== History ==
The modest, baroque synagogue is made of sandstone from a nearby quarry. The current structure was built shortly after the previous building was destroyed in a fire in 1793. It was in use until the Second World War. It survived the war, but the adjacent houses were torn down and the synagogue was allowed to deteriorate during the post-war period. The roof decayed, and the interior furnishings were burned.

The building was renovated by the Czech Jewish Federation in a project that began in 1995–2003 and 2010–2014. The synagogue was re-opened to the public in June 2014.

== See also ==
- History of the Jews in the Czech Republic
