= Golem =

Being in Jewish folklore made from clay

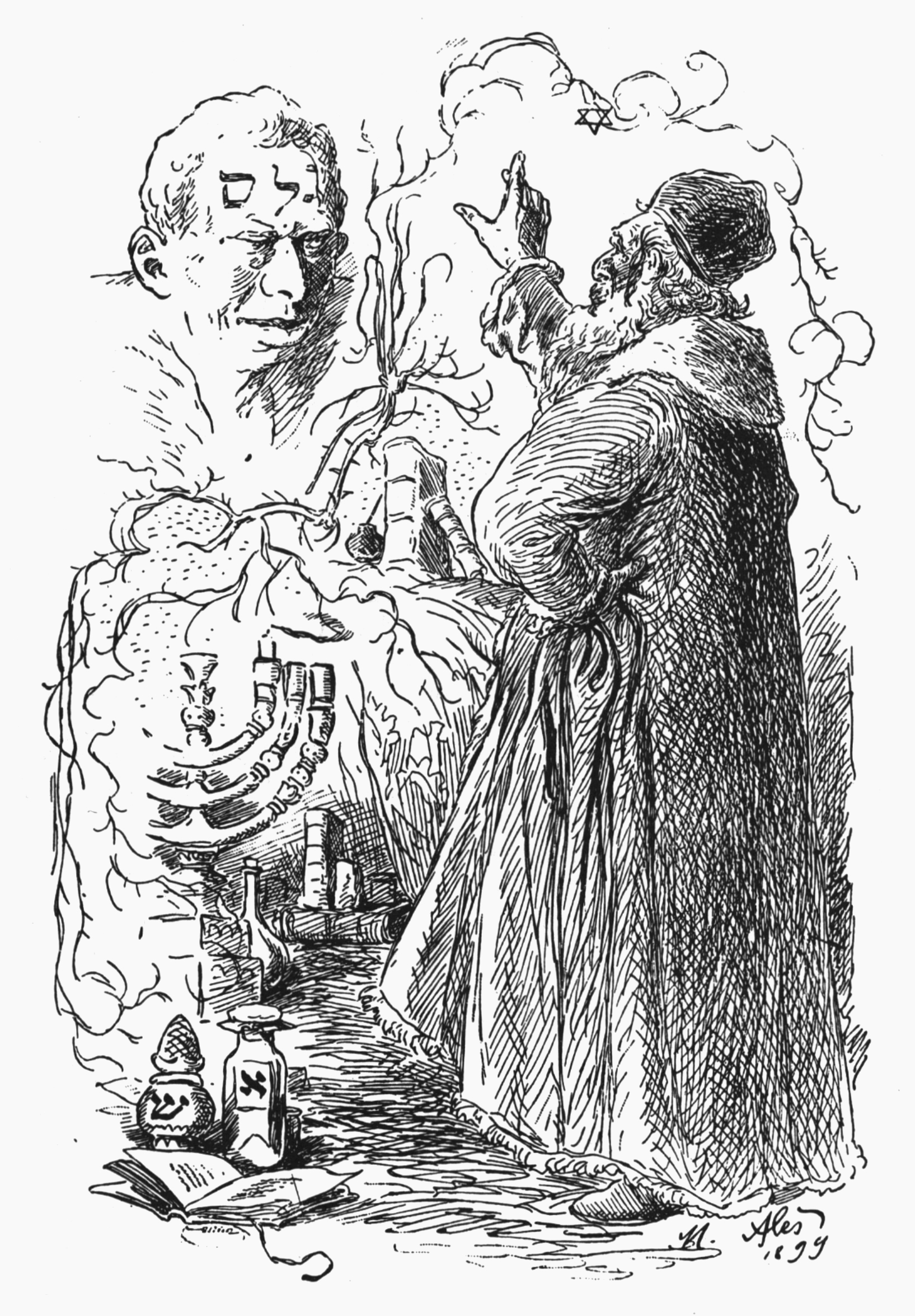
- The Maharal of Prague and the Golem

Creature information
- Other name: Gōlem (גּוֹלֶם)
- Grouping: Monster
- Folklore: Jewish folklore

Origin
- First attested: Talmud
- Country: Kingdom of Bohemia
- Region: Prague
- Habitat: Typically resides in attics or temples
- Details: Protector of the Jewish community, created from clay or mud, animated through mystical rituals.

A golem (/ˈɡoʊ.ləm/ GOH-ləm; Hebrew: גּוֹלֶם, romanized: gōlem) is an animated anthropomorphic being in Jewish folklore that is created entirely from inanimate matter, usually clay or mud. The most famous golem narrative involves Rabbi Judah Loew ben Bezalel, the late-16th-century rabbi of Prague. According to Moment magazine, "the golem is a highly mutable metaphor with seemingly limitless symbolism. It can be a victim or villain, man or woman—or sometimes both. Over the centuries, it has been used to connote war, community, isolation, hope, and despair."

The Golem, in Jewish tradition, may be compared to the popular trope of the Frankenstein monster (19th century). Indeed, the Golem is even a precursor or inspiration of the Frankenstein monster in several phases of the folklore. Whereas Mary Shelley's book, Frankenstein, was written in the 1810s, legends of the Golem go all the way back to 12th century in the tradition of Jewish Kabbalah—if not further, back to the Talmud.

In modern culture, the term denotes "any magically created human figure", with such beings appearing frequently in tabletop role-playing games and video games.

== Etymology ==
The word golem occurs once in the Bible, in Psalm 139, which uses the word גׇּלְמִ֤י (golmi; 'my golem', 'my life form', 'raw material') to connote the unfinished human being before God's eyes. Pirkei Avot 5:9 uses the term to refer to someone who is unsophisticated: "[There are] seven things [characteristic] in a clod, and seven in a wise man" (שִׁבְעָה דְבָרִים בַּגֹּלֶם וְשִׁבְעָה בֶחָכָם).

In Modern Hebrew, golem is used to mean 'dumb', 'helpless', or 'pupa'. Similarly, it is often used today as a metaphor for a stupid man or other entity that serves a man under controlled conditions, but is hostile to him in other circumstances. Golem passed into Yiddish as goylem, meaning someone who is lethargic or in a stupor.

== History ==
=== Earliest stories ===
The oldest stories of golems date to early Judaism. In the Talmud (Tractate Sanhedrin 38b), Adam is initially created as a golem (גולם) when his dust is "kneaded into a shapeless husk". Like Adam, all golems are created from mud by those close to divinity, but no anthropogenic golem is fully human. Early on, the main disability of the golem was its inability to speak. Sanhedrin 65b describes Rava creating a man (gavra), whom he then sends to Rav Zeira. Zeira speaks to the man, but he does not answer, whereupon Zeira says, "You were created by the sages; return to your dust". (Note: Jewish Babylonian Aramaic: מן חבריא את הדר לעפריך)

During the Middle Ages, passages from the Sefer Yetzirah were studied as a means to create and animate a golem, although little in the writings of Jewish mysticism supports this belief. The earliest known written account of how to create a golem can be found in the Sode Raza, a commentary on Merkabah mysticism by Eleazar of Worms, who lived in the late 12th and early 13th centuries.

It was believed that golems could be activated by an ecstatic experience induced by the ritual use of various letters of the Hebrew alphabet forming one of the names of God. This was written on a piece of paper and inserted into the mouth or forehead of the golem.

In some tales, including certain stories of the Chełm and Prague golems, a word such as אמת emeṯ 'truth' is inscribed on the golem, sometimes on its forehead. In this example, the golem could then be deactivated by removing the aleph (א), thus changing the inscription from "truth" to "dead" (מֵת, mēt, 'dead').

One source credits Solomon ibn Gabirol, who lived in the 11th century, with creating a golem, possibly female, for household chores. A legend also existed claiming that Samuel of Speyer created a golem in the 12th century.

In 1625, Joseph Solomon Delmedigo wrote that "many legends of this sort are current, particularly in Germany."

=== Golem of Chełm ===
The oldest description of the creation of a golem by a historical figure is included in a tradition connected to the Baal Shem (folk healer) named Elijah of Chełm (1550–1583).

The Christian author Christoph Arnold in a letter written in 1674 reported the creation of a golem by Rabbi Eliyahu thusly:

Polish Jews say that there was a Jew in Poland named Rabbi Eliyahu Baal Shem who made a golem from lime for the purpose of being a servant and doing housework. It was animated by having the word emes (truth) written on its forehead. But it kept on growing and getting stronger. To stop this, the alef needed to be erased from the word emes, leaving the word meis (dead). And when the rabbi noticed that the servant had grown so large that he could no longer reach its forehead and erase the letter, he came up with the trick of commanding the golem to take off its boots, assuming that when the golem bent over, he could erase the letter from its forehead. And so it was, but when the golem returned and turned into clay, all its weight fell on the rabbi and crushed him.

A similar account was reported by an unnamed Polish Kabbalist, writing in about 1730–1750,

And I have heard, in a certain and explicit way, from several respectable persons that one man [living] close to our time, whose name is R. Eliyahu, the master of the name, who made a creature out of matter [Heb. Golem] and form [Heb. tzurah] and it performed hard work for him, for a long period, and the name of emet was hanging upon his neck until he finally removed it for a certain reason, the name from his neck and it turned to dust.

The Rabbi Jacob Emden elaborated on the story in his autobiography Megillas Sefer written in 1748:

As an aside, I'll mention here what I heard from my father's holy mouth regarding the Golem created by his ancestor, the Gaon R. Eliyahu Ba'al Shem of blessed memory. When the Gaon saw that the Golem was growing larger and larger, he feared that the Golem would destroy the universe. He then removed the Holy Name that was embedded on his forehead, thus causing him to disintegrate and return to dust. Nonetheless, while he was engaged in extracting the Holy Name from him, the Golem injured him, scarring him on the face.

According to the Polish Kabbalist, "the legend was known to several persons, thus allowing us to speculate that the legend had indeed circulated for some time before it was committed to writing and, consequently, we may assume that its origins are to be traced to the generation immediately following the death of R. Eliyahu, if not earlier."

=== Classic narrative: The Golem of Prague ===
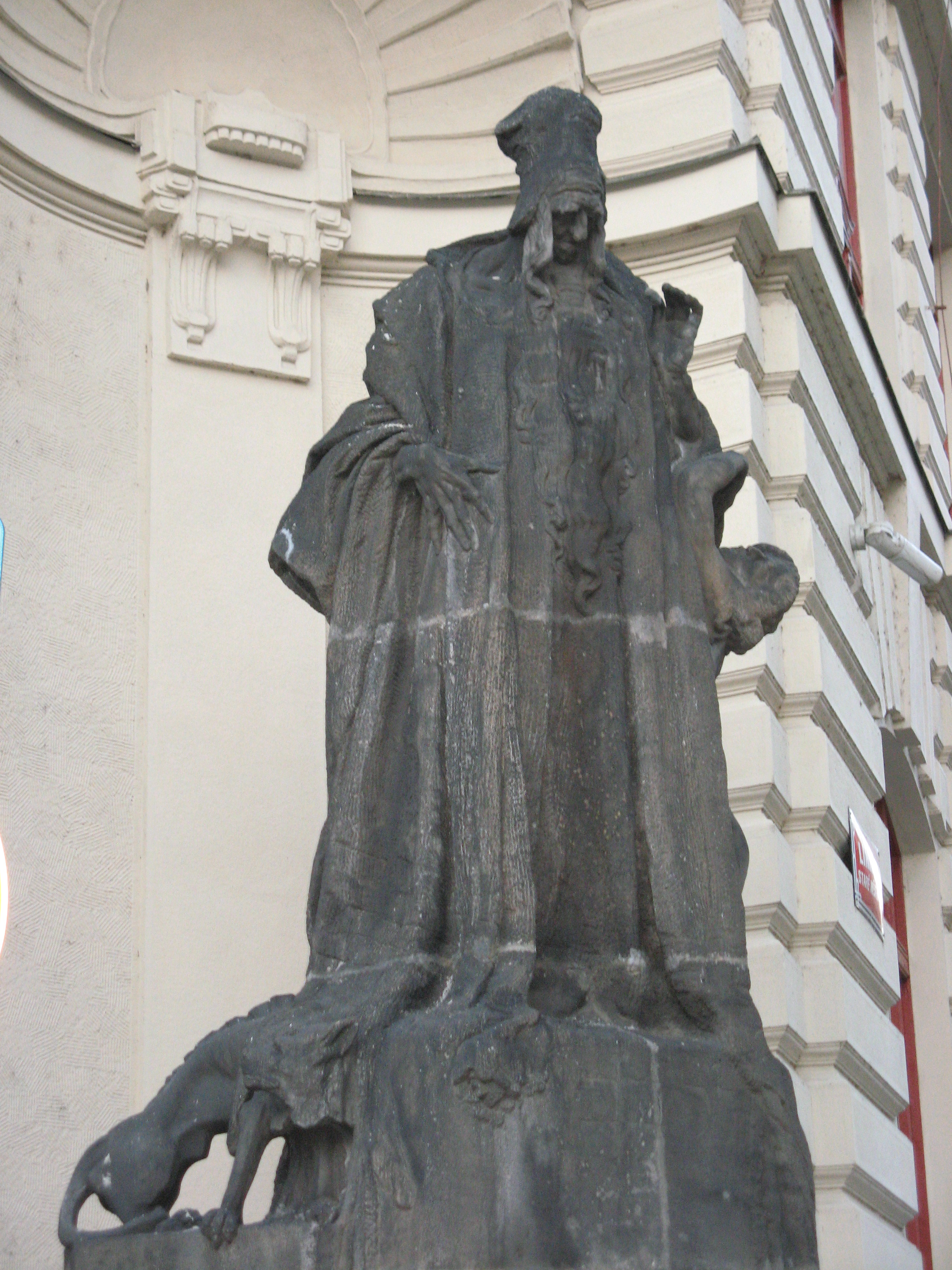
Rabbi Loew statue at the New City Hall of Prague

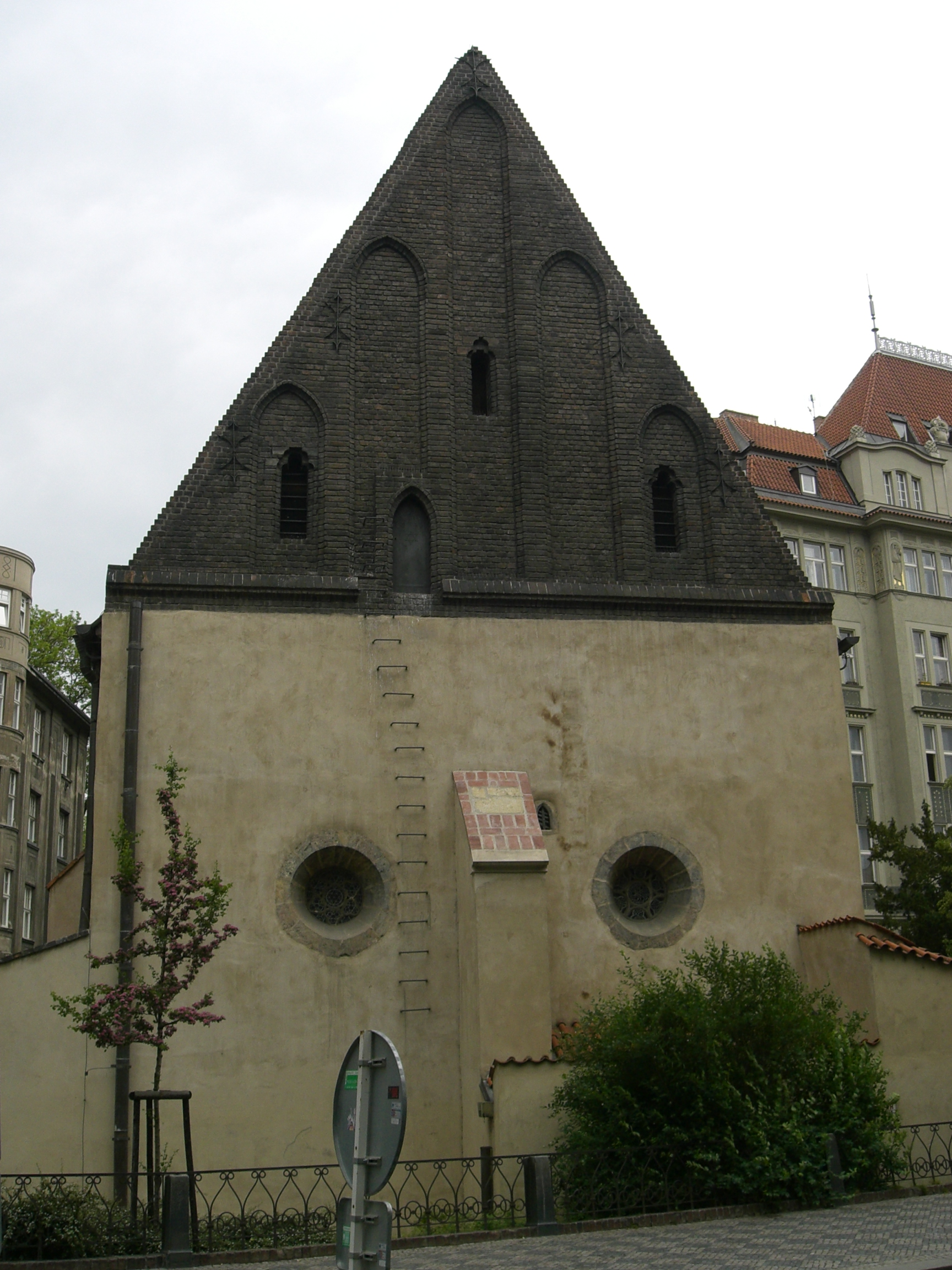
Old New Synagogue of Prague with the rungs of the ladder to the attic on the wall. In the legend, the Golem was in the loft.

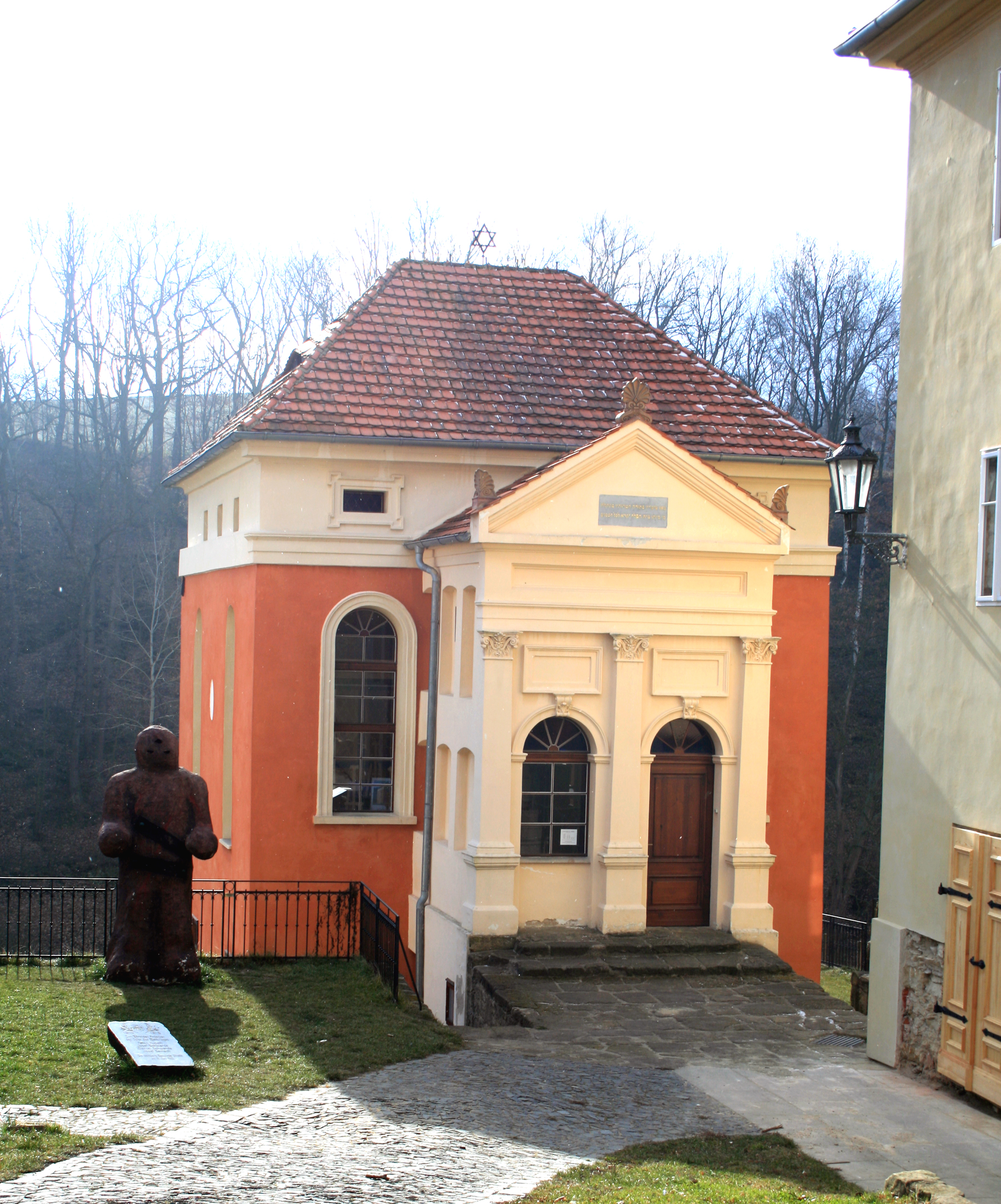
The Úštěk Synagogue with a statue of a Golem in Úštěk

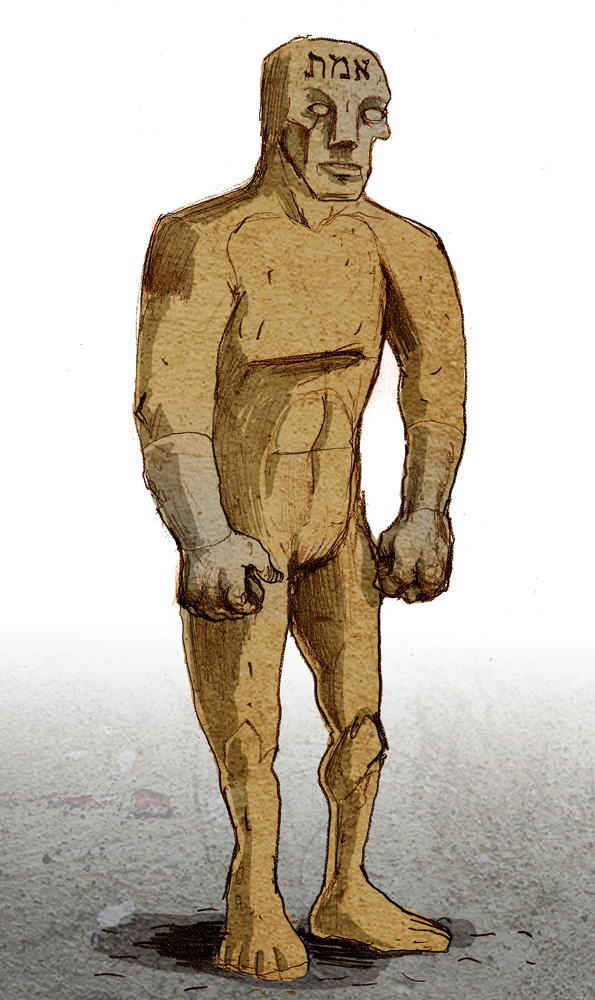
Illustration by Philippe Semeria, 2009. The Hebrew word אמת, 'truth', is inscribed on the golem's forehead.

The most famous golem narrative involves Judah Loew ben Bezalel, the late 16th-century rabbi of Prague, also known as the Maharal, who reportedly "created a golem out of clay from the banks of the Vltava River and brought it to life through rituals and Hebrew incantations to defend the Prague ghetto from antisemitic attacks and pogroms". Depending on the version of the legend, the Jews in Prague were to be either expelled or killed under the rule of Rudolf II, the Holy Roman Emperor. The Golem was called Josef and was known as Yossele. He was said to be able to make himself invisible and summon spirits from the dead. To animate the Golem, the Rabbi wrote the name of God on a slip of paper (called the shem); this was placed inside the Golem's head or mouth. Rabbi Loew deactivated the Golem on Friday evenings by removing the shem before the Sabbath (Saturday) began, so as to let it rest on Sabbath.

One Friday evening, Rabbi Loew forgot to remove the shem, and feared that the Golem would desecrate the Sabbath. A different story tells of a golem that fell in love, and when rejected, became the violent monster seen in most accounts. Some versions have the golem eventually going on a murderous rampage. The rabbi then managed to pull the shem from his mouth and immobilize him in front of the synagogue, whereupon the golem fell in pieces. The Golem's body was stored in the attic genizah of the Old New Synagogue, where it would be restored to life again if needed.

Rabbi Loew then forbade anyone except his successors from going into the attic. Rabbi Yechezkel Landau, a successor of Rabbi Loew, reportedly wanted to go up the steps to the attic when he was Chief Rabbi of Prague to verify the tradition. Rabbi Landau fasted and immersed himself in a mikveh, wrapped himself in phylacteries and a prayer-shawl and started ascending the steps. At the top of the steps, he hesitated and then came immediately back down, trembling and frightened. He then reiterated Rabbi Loew's original warning.

According to legend, the body of Rabbi Loew's Golem still lies in the synagogue's attic. When the attic was renovated in 1883, no evidence of the Golem was found. Some versions of the tale state that the Golem was stolen from the genizah and entombed in a graveyard in Prague's Žižkov district, where the Žižkov Television Tower now stands. A recent legend tells of a Nazi agent ascending to the synagogue attic, dying under suspicious circumstances thereafter. The attic is not open to the general public.

Some Orthodox Jews believe that the Maharal did actually create a golem. The evidence for this belief has been analyzed from an Orthodox Jewish perspective by Shnayer Z. Leiman.

=== Sources of the Prague narrative ===
The general view of historians and critics is that the story of the Golem of Prague was a German literary invention of the early 19th century. According to John Neubauer, the first writers on the Prague Golem were:

- 1837: Berthold Auerbach, Spinoza
- 1841: Gustav Philippson, Der Golam, eine Legende
- 1841: Franz Klutschak, Der Golam des Rabbi Löw
- 1842: Abraham Tendlau, Der Golem des Hoch-Rabbi-Löb
- 1847: Georg Leopold Weisel, Der Golem

A few slightly earlier examples are known, in 1834 and 1836.

All of these early accounts of the Golem of Prague are in German by Jewish writers. They are suggested to have emerged as part of a Jewish folklore movement parallel with the contemporary German folklore movement.

The origins of the story have been obscured by attempts to exaggerate its age and to pretend that it dates from the time of the Maharal. Rabbi Yudel Rosenberg (1859–1935) of Tarłów, before moving to Canada where he became one of its most prominent rabbis, is said to have originated the idea that the narrative dates from the time of the Maharal. Rosenberg published Nifl'os Maharal (Wonders of Maharal) (Piotrków, 1909), which purported to be an eyewitness account by the Maharal's son-in-law, who had helped to create the Golem. Rabbi Meir Mazuz commented that Rosenberg was a forger and stories of the Maharal creating a Golem stem from Rosenberg's fabrication.

Rosenberg claimed that the book was based upon a manuscript that he found in the main library in Metz. Wonders of Maharal "is generally recognized in academic circles to be a literary hoax". Gershom Sholem observed that the manuscript "contains not ancient legends, but modern fiction". Rosenberg's claim was further disseminated in Chayim Bloch's (1881–1973) The Golem: Legends of the Ghetto of Prague, English edition 1925.

The Jewish Encyclopedia of 1906 cites the historical work Zemach David by David Gans, a disciple of the Maharal, published in 1592. In it, Gans writes of an audience between the Maharal and Rudolph II: "Our lord the emperor ... Rudolph ... sent for and called upon our master Rabbi Low ben Bezalel and received him with a welcome and merry expression, and spoke to him face to face, as one would to a friend. The nature and quality of their words are mysterious, sealed, and hidden."

But it has been said of this passage, "Even when [the Maharal is] eulogized, whether in David Gans' Zemach David or on his epitaph ..., not a word is said about the creation of a golem. No Hebrew work published in the 16th, 17th, and 18th centuries (even in Prague) is aware that the Maharal created a golem." Furthermore, the Maharal himself did not refer to the Golem in his writings. Rabbi Yedidiah Tiah Weil (1721–1805), a Prague resident, who described the creation of golems, including those created by Rabbis Avigdor Kara of Prague (died 1439) and Eliyahu of Chelm, did not mention the Maharal. Rabbi Meir Perils' biography of the Maharal published in 1718 does not mention a golem.

=== Golem of Vilna ===
A similar tradition relates to the Vilna Gaon, "the saintly genius from Vilnius" (1720–1797). Rabbi Chaim Volozhin (1749–1821) reported in an introduction to Sifra de Tzeniuta that he once presented to his teacher, the Vilna Gaon, ten different versions of a certain passage in the Sefer Yetzira and asked the Gaon to determine the correct text. The Gaon immediately identified one version as the accurate rendition of the passage.

The amazed student then commented to his teacher that, with such clarity, he should easily be able to create a live human. The Gaon affirmed Rabbi Chaim's assertion and said that he once began to create a person when he was a child, under the age of 13, but during the process, he received a sign from Heaven ordering him to desist because of his youth.

== Theme of hubris ==
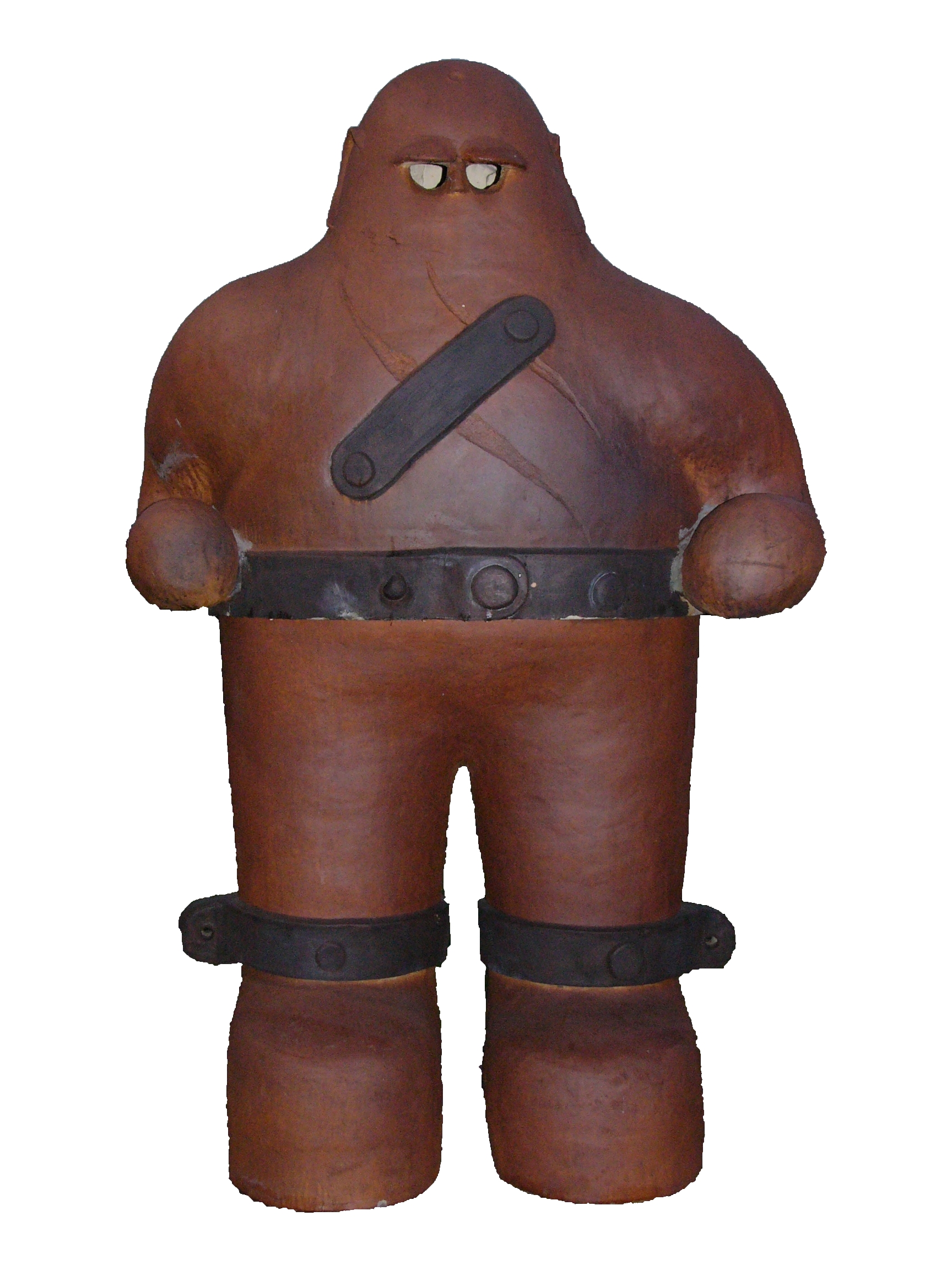
A statue of the Prague Golem created for the film The Emperor and the Golem

The existence of a golem is sometimes a mixed blessing. Golems are not intelligent; if commanded to perform a task, they will perform the instructions literally. In many depictions, golems are inherently perfectly obedient. In its earliest known modern form, the Golem of Chełm became enormous and uncooperative. In one version of this story, the rabbi had to resort to trickery to deactivate it, whereupon it crumbled upon its creator and crushed him.

A similar theme of hubris is seen in Frankenstein, The Sorcerer's Apprentice, and some other stories in popular culture. The theme manifests itself in R.U.R. (Rossum's Universal Robots), Karel Čapek's 1921 play that coined the term robot. The play was written in Prague, and while Čapek denied that he modeled the robot after the golem, many similarities are seen in the plot.

== Clay Boy variation ==
A Yiddish and Slavic folktale is the Clay Boy, which combines elements of the golem and The Gingerbread Man, in which a lonely couple makes a child out of clay, with disastrous or comical consequences.

In one common Russian version, an older couple, whose children have left home, make a boy out of clay and dry him by their hearth. The Clay Boy (Russian: Гли́няный па́рень, Glínyanyĭ párenʹ) comes to life; at first, the couple is delighted and treats him like a real child, but the Clay Boy does not stop growing and eats all their food, then all their livestock, and then the Clay Boy eats his parents. The Clay Boy rampages through the village until he is smashed by a quick-thinking goat.

== In popular culture ==
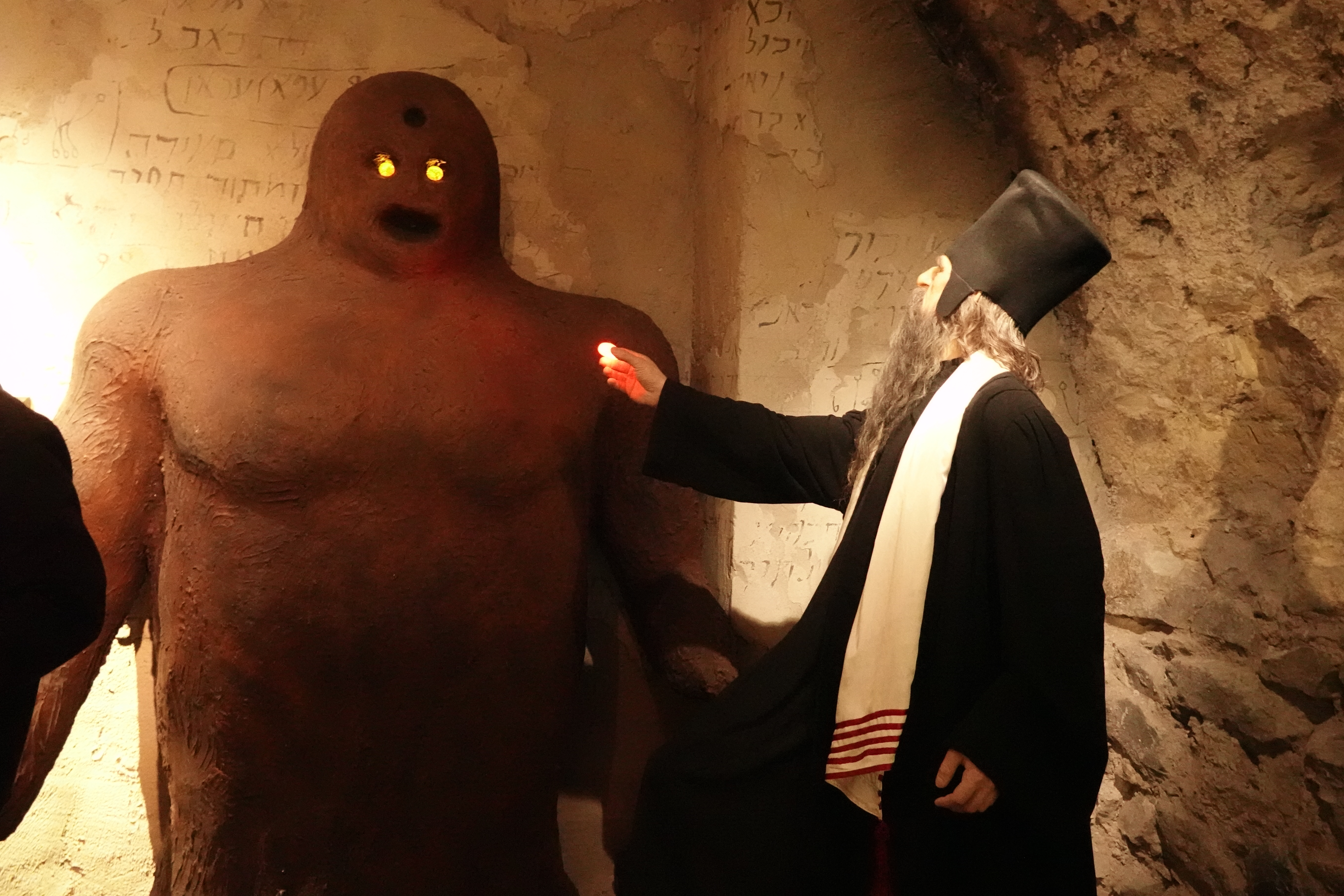
Golem depicted at Madame Tussauds in Prague

The golem is a popular figure in the Czech Republic. The 1915 novel by Gustav Meyrink (The Golem) was briefly popular and did much to keep the imagination about the golem going. Several restaurants and other businesses have names that make reference to the creature. A Czech strongman, René Richter goes by the nickname "Golem", and a Czech monster truck outfit calls itself the "Golem Team".

In modern popular culture, the word has become generalized, and any crude automaton devised by a sorcerer may be termed a "golem". The term is often used to refer to "any magically created human figure" rather than specifically "a humanoid formed by Kabbalistic means".

Golems appear in the fantasy role-playing game Dungeons & Dragons (first published in 1974), and the influence of Dungeons & Dragons has led to the inclusion of golems in other tabletop role-playing games, as well as in video games. There are many varieties of golems in the game, and Backstab reviewer Philippe Tessier called the creature a "classic of D&D". The clay golem is based on the golem of Medieval Jewish folklore, though changed from "a cherished defender to an unthinking hulk". The flesh golem is related to Frankenstein's monster as Universal's 1931 film, with traits such as being empowered by electricity, though again with the difference of being essentially an unthinking machine. D&D's golems are also rooted in Gothic fiction more generally, and are typical denizens of the Ravenloft setting.

== See also ==
- Brazen head
- Jewish folklore
- Dybbuk
- Frankenstein's monster
- Homunculus
- Kratt
- Pinocchio
- Prometheus
- Pygmalion and Galatea
- Creation of life from clay
- Shabti
- Talos
- Totem
- Tulpa
- Tupilaq
