= Wall of Češov =

Celtic wall remains

Coordinates: 50°19′56.85″N 15°20′58.28″E

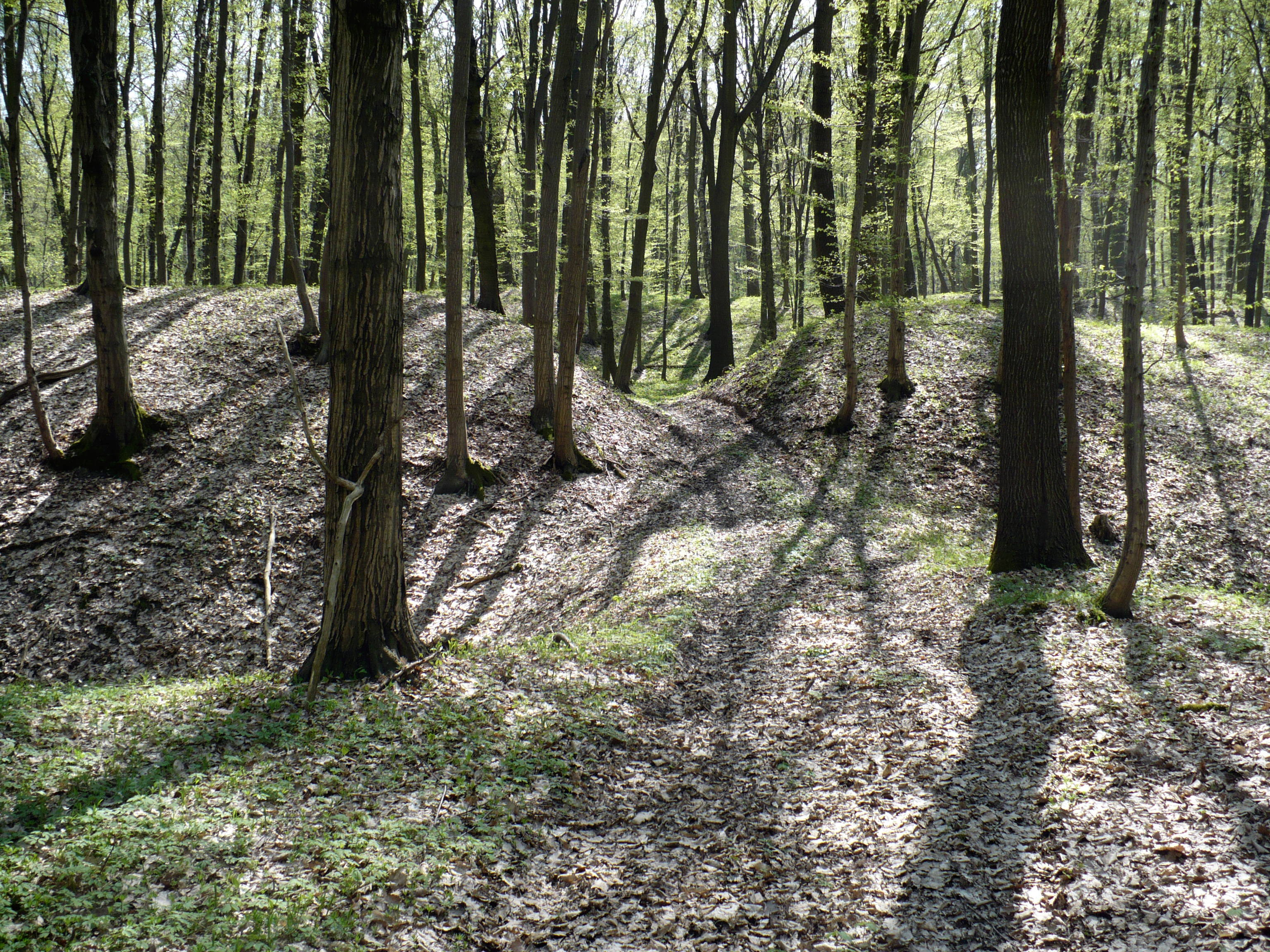
Wall of Češov

The Wall of Češov (Czech: Češovské valy) are ramparts in the municipality of Češov in the Hradec Králové Region of the Czech Republic. It is the largest site of its kind in the country. It was probably built to protect a Celtic oppidum in the 1st century BC.

== Description ==
It covers an area of 35 ha. The rampart is a maximum of 12 metres high and 55 metres wide, which makes it the largest site of its kind in the country. It is estimated that the material used for building the ramparts could fill 15,000 railway carriages.

== History ==
Historians have been disputing the origin of the ramparts for decades. Nowadays, the most common theory is that the ramparts protected a Celtic oppidum. It was built in the Iron Age, in the 1st century BC. A lot of Iron Age pottery has been found in the locality. In the 6th century AD, the ramparts were used by Slavs. At the time of the Hussite Revolution, General Jan Žižka used the ramparts as a fortress, as did the Swedes, who built a newer part of the ramparts during the Thirty Years' War. In the Austro-Prussian War, the ramparts served as a refuge for local civilians.
