= Úštěk =

- Town
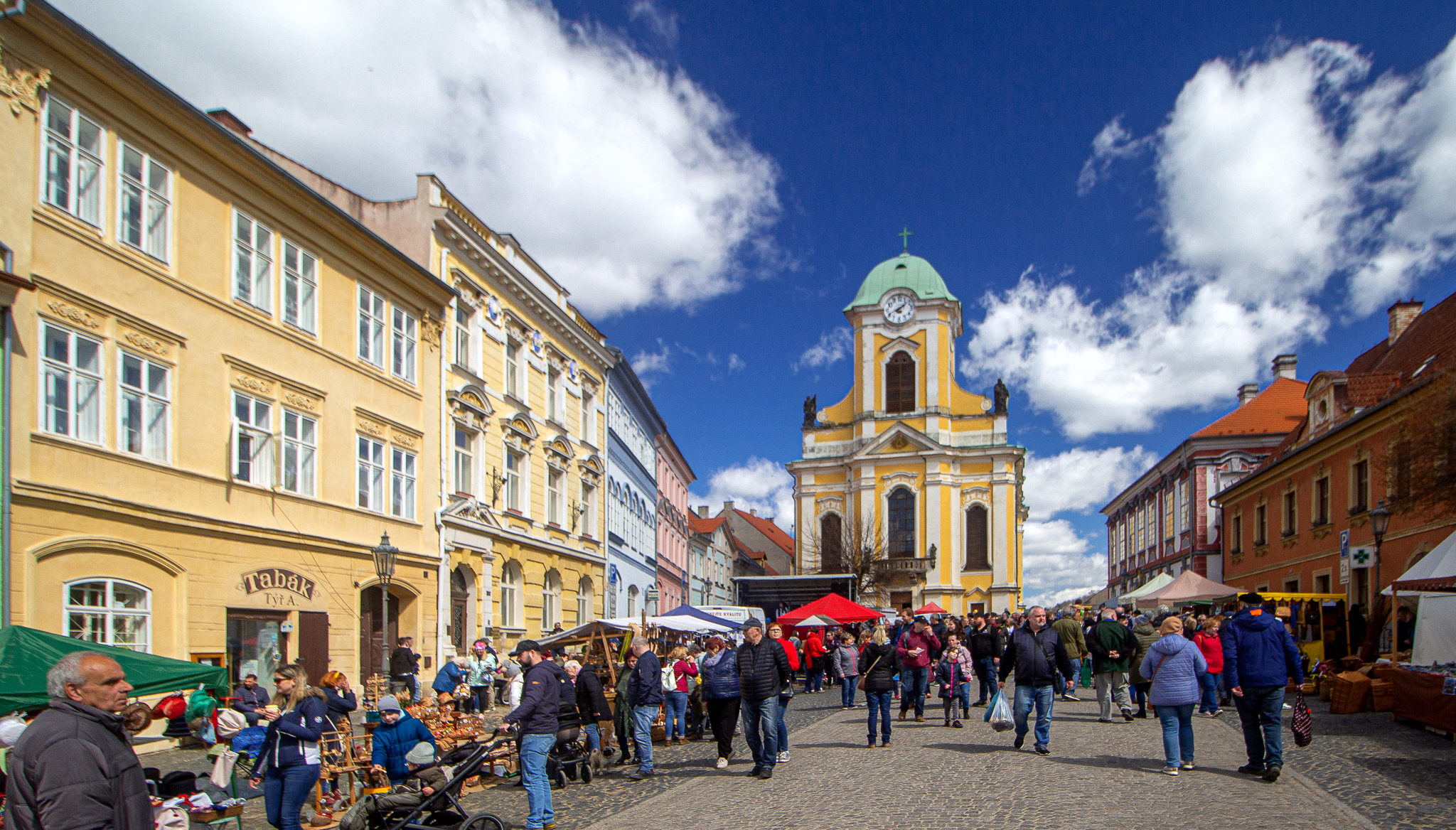
- Town square

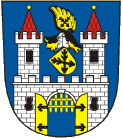
- Flag Coat of arms

- Location in the Czech Republic
- Coordinates: 50°35′36″N 14°20′55″E
- Country: Czech Republic
- Region: Ústí nad Labem
- District: Litoměřice
- First mentioned: 1218

Government
  - Mayor: Ondřej Elísek

Area
  - Total: 74.94 km^{2} (28.93 sq mi)
- Elevation: 242 m (794 ft)

Population (2026-01-01)
  - Total: 2,830
  - Density: 37.8/km^{2} (97.8/sq mi)
- Time zone: UTC+1 (CET)
  - Summer (DST): UTC+2 (CEST)
- Postal codes: 411 08, 411 45
- Website: www.mesto-ustek.cz

Úštěk (Czech pronunciation: [ˈuːʃcɛk]; German: Auscha) is a town in Litoměřice District in the Ústí nad Labem Region of the Czech Republic. It has about 2,800 inhabitants. The town proper is located on the stream Úštěcký potok in the Ralsko Uplands.

The historic town centre, which includes characteristic gabled houses, is well preserved and is protected as an urban monument reservation. The main landmark of Úštěk is the Church of Saints Peter and Paul.

== Administrative division ==
Úštěk consists of 24 municipal parts (in brackets population according to the 2021 census):

- Úštěk-České Předměstí (330)
- Úštěk-Českolipské Předměstí (777)
- Úštěk-Vnitřní Město (415)
- Bílý Kostelec (18)
- Brusov (15)
- Dolní Vysoké (22)
- Držovice (28)
- Dubičná (56)
- Habřina (78)
- Julčín (53)
- Kalovice (40)
- Konojedy (142)
- Lhota (11)
- Ličenice (33)
- Lukov (141)
- Ostré (64)
- Rašovice (37)
- Robeč (69)
- Rochov (60)
- Starý Týn (122)
- Tetčiněves (126)
- Třebín (27)
- Vědlice (88)
- Zelený (0)

== Etymology ==
The origin of the name is uncertain. According to the most probable theory, the initial name of the settlement was Úseč, derived from the personal name Úsek. Through the genitives Úšče and then Úště, it was distorted to Úštěk.

== Geography ==
Úštěk is located about 15 kilometres (9 mi) northeast of Litoměřice and 22 km (14 mi) southeast of Ústí nad Labem. The municipal territory lies mostly in the Ralsko Uplands, but it also extends into the Central Bohemian Uplands in the north, where is located the highest point of Úštěk, the hill Pohorský vrch at 601 m (1,972 ft) above sea level.

The town is situated on the stream Úštěcký potok and on the shore of the fishpond Chmelař. The streams Loubní potok and Červený potok also flow through the town before they join the Úštěcký potok.

== History ==
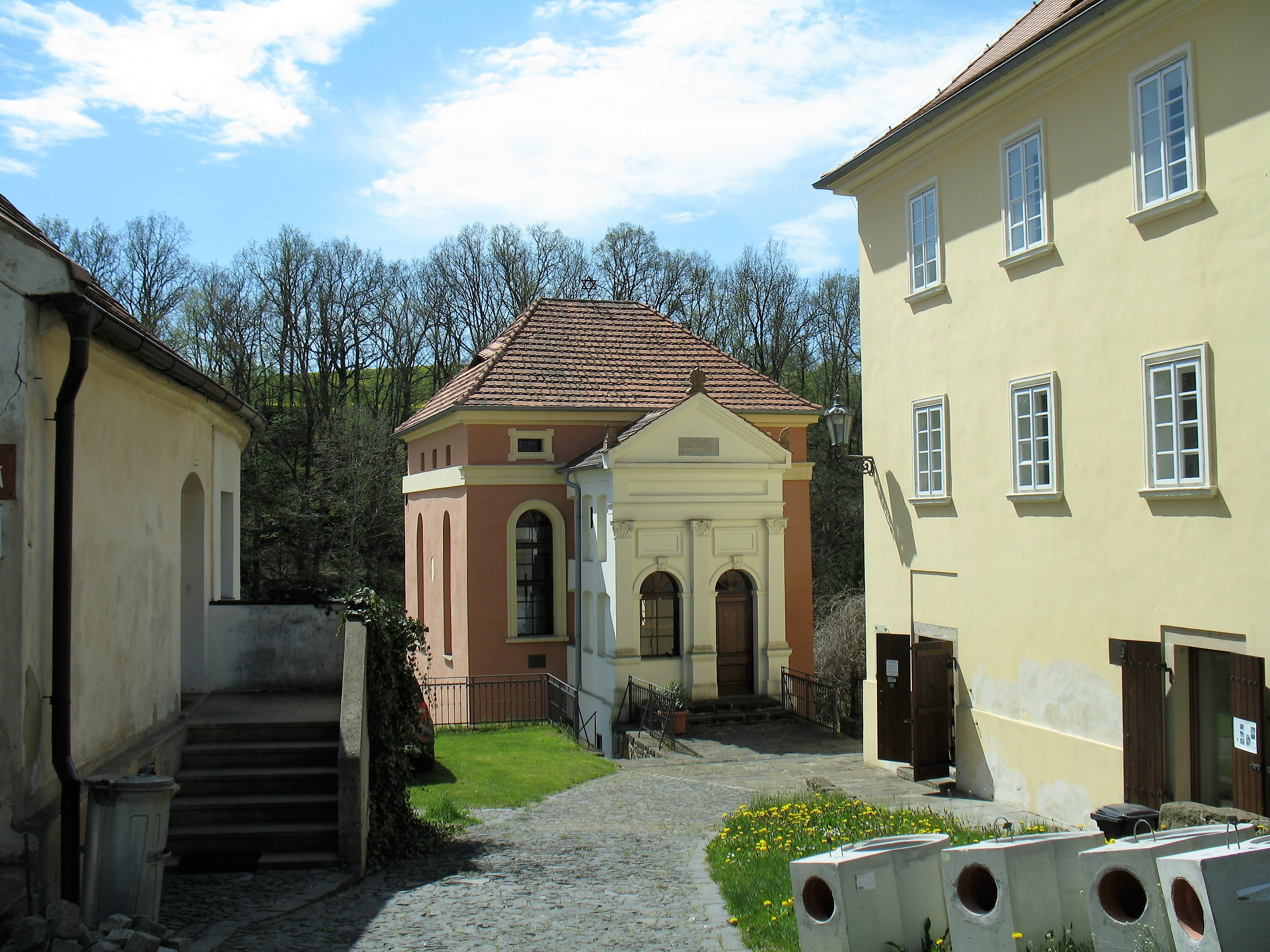
Synagogue and Rabbi's house

According to archaeological excavations, the area of Úštěk was inhabited from the 10th century. The first written mention of Úštěk is in the foundation deed of the Litoměřice Chapter from 1218. The importance of Úštěk has increased in the 14th century, during the rule of the Lords of Michalovice. Around 1361, the settlement was promoted to a town. In 1387, the Lords of Michalovice were forced to sell Úštěk to the Berka of Dubá family due to debts. They ruled the town until 1426, when it was bought by Václav Carda of Petrovice. He had fortified the town.

In 1475, the town was acquired by marriage by the noble family of Sezima of Ústí. Under their rule, Úštěk prospered and grew rapidly, which lasted until the Battle of White Mountain in 1620. In 1622, the Úštěk estate was confiscated and divided into two parts, which fell to Prague and Litoměřice Jesuits. The Jesuits in Úštěk supported the development of crafts and agriculture, especially hop growing. A lerga fire destroyed most of the town square in 1765. The Jesuits owned Úštěk until the abolishment of their order in 1773. Afterwards, the estate's assets were managed by various funds and gradually sold off. From 1838 until the establishment of an independent municipality in 1849, Úštěk was part of the Liběšice estate, owned by the Lobkowicz family.

== Demographics ==
Historical population

Year	Pop.	±%
1869	7,544	—
1880	7,777	+3.1%
1890	7,738	−0.5%
1900	7,595	−1.8%
1910	7,284	−4.1%

Year	Pop.	±%
1921	6,882	−5.5%
1930	7,194	+4.5%
1950	3,817	−46.9%
1961	3,754	−1.7%
1970	3,187	−15.1%

Year	Pop.	±%
1980	2,981	−6.5%
1991	2,703	−9.3%
2001	2,662	−1.5%
2011	2,688	+1.0%
2021	2,752	+2.4%

Source: Censuses

== Transport ==
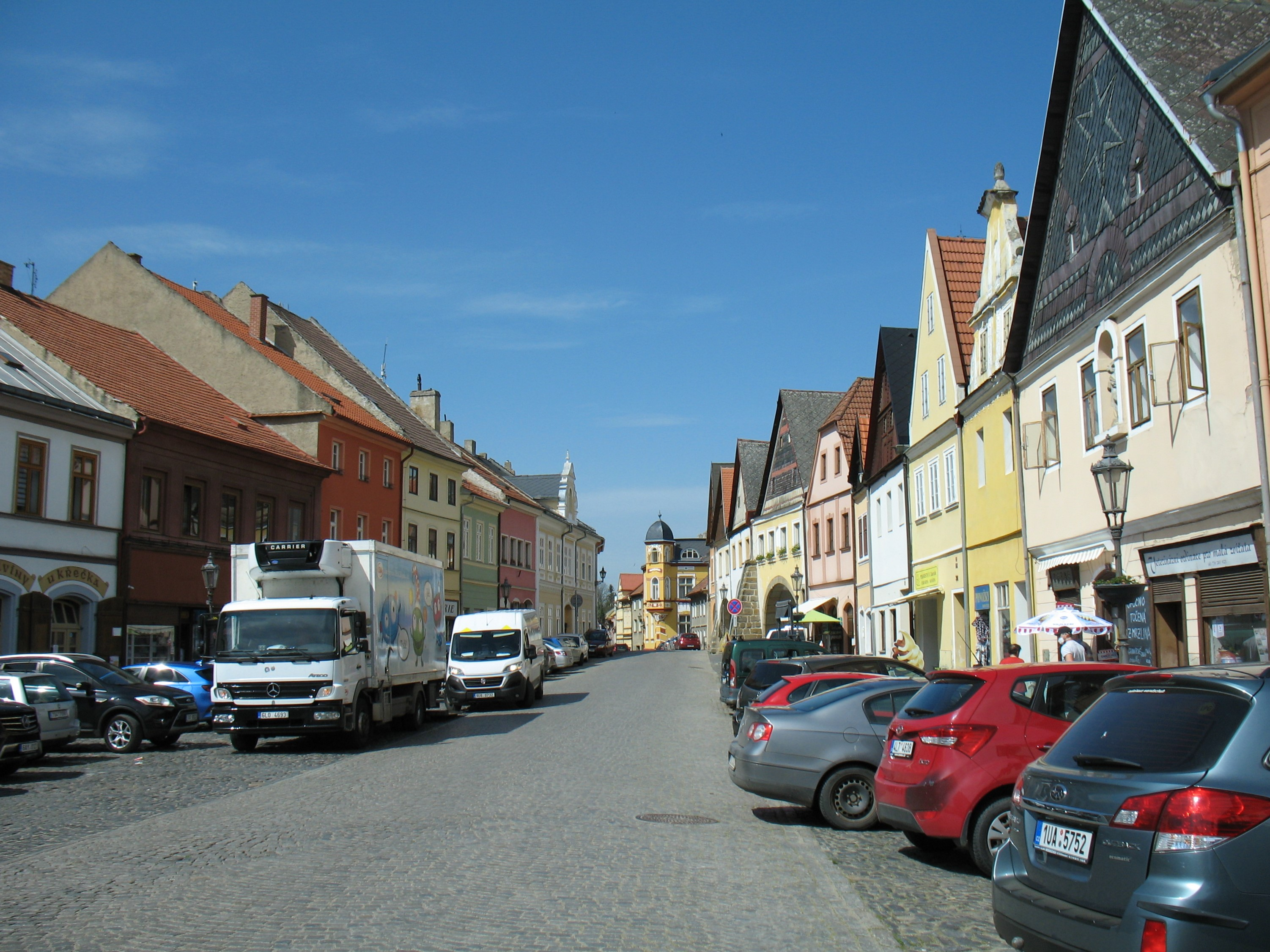
Western part of the town square

The I/15 road (the section from Česká Lípa to Litoměřice) runs through the town.

Úštěk is located on the railway line Česká Lípa–Postoloprty.

== Sights ==
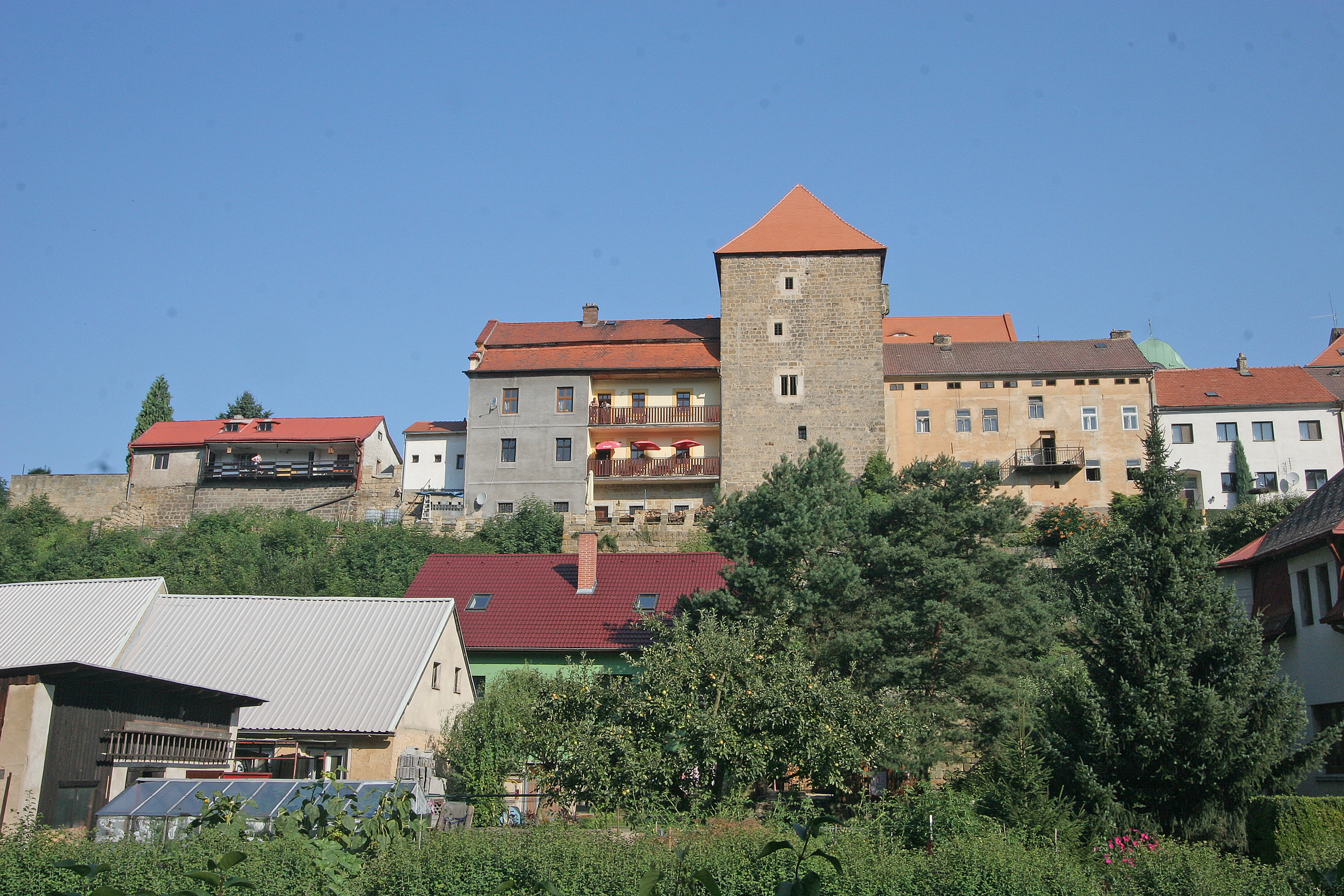
Town fortifications with the Pikart Tower

The town is renowned for its medieval centre, formed by the square Mírové náměstí and its surroundings. A typical element of the square are houses with gables from the Middle Ages and from the 17th century. The historical town centre is protected as an urban monument reservation.

The main landmark of Úštěk is the Church of Saints Peter and Paul, located in the middle of the town square. It was built in the late Baroque style in 1764–1772.

The historic centre is delimited by remains of the town walls. The Pikart Tower is the largest and strongest tower of the town fortification. It is a massive sandstone tower built in 1428. It has four floors, but the top floor was reduced after a fire in 1859. Today there is an art gallery.

The restored Úštěk Synagogue is also a significant monument. Today the building serves cultural purposes and hosts exhibitions.

== In popular culture ==
Úštěk was used as a filming location for many historical films and TV series, including Kolya (1996), The Land Gone Wild (1997), Rebelové (2001), Guard No. 47 (2008) and Oscar-winning Jojo Rabbit (2019). Other films and TV series were filmed in the immediate vicinity of the town.

== Notable people ==
- Kajetán Vogl (c. 1750 – 1794), composer
