= Češov =

- Municipality
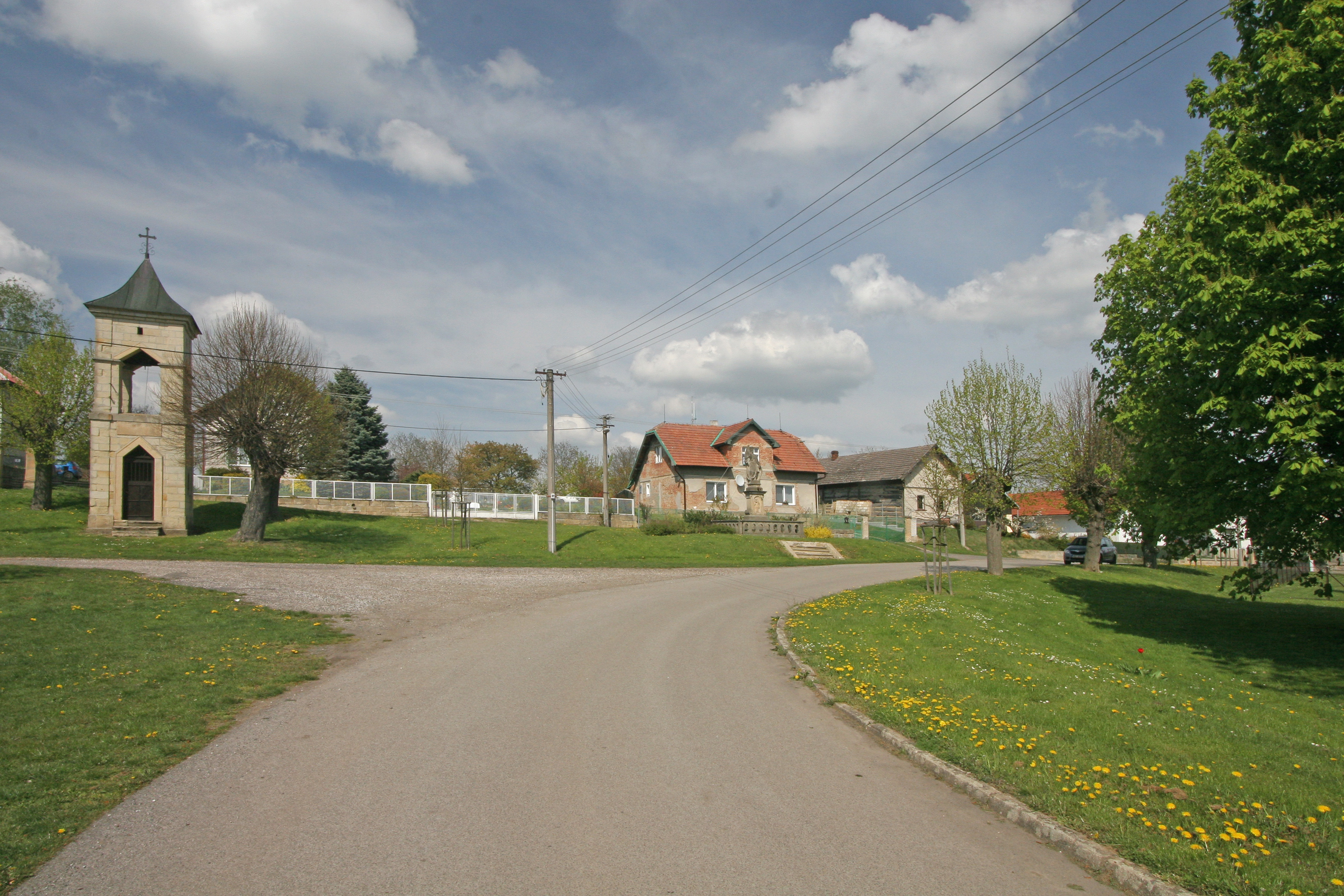
- Centre of Češov

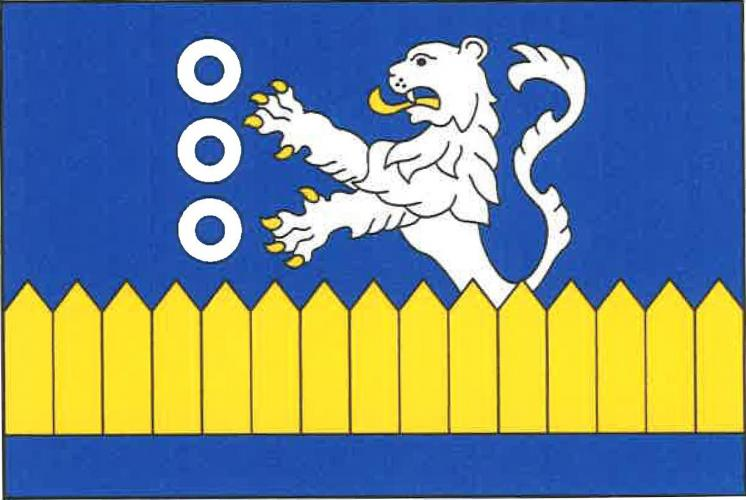
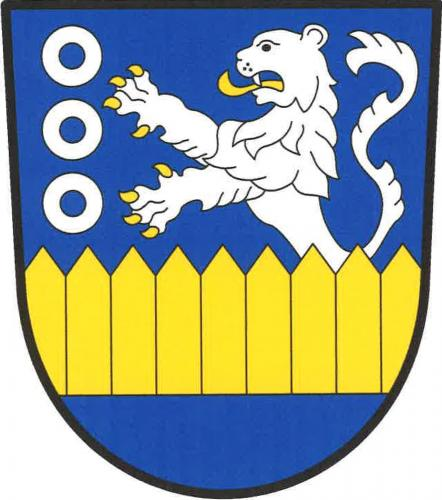
- Flag Coat of arms

- Location in the Czech Republic
- Coordinates: 50°20′21″N 15°21′37″E
- Country: Czech Republic
- Region: Hradec Králové
- District: Jičín
- First mentioned: 1360

Area
  - Total: 8.75 km^{2} (3.38 sq mi)
- Elevation: 292 m (958 ft)

Population (2026-01-01)
  - Total: 246
  - Density: 28.1/km^{2} (72.8/sq mi)
- Time zone: UTC+1 (CET)
  - Summer (DST): UTC+2 (CEST)
- Postal code: 506 01
- Website: www.cesov-libesice.cz

Češov is a municipality and village in Jičín District in the Hradec Králové Region of the Czech Republic. It has about 200 inhabitants. Češov is known for the Wall of Češov, which is remnants of a Celtic oppidum.

== Administrative division ==
Češov consists of two municipal parts (in brackets population according to the 2021 census):

- Češov (165)
- Liběšice (77)

== Demographics ==
Historical population
| Year | Pop. | ±% |
|---|---|---|
| 1869 | 638 | — |
| 1880 | 598 | −6.3% |
| 1890 | 650 | +8.7% |
| 1900 | 641 | −1.4% |
| 1910 | 656 | +2.3% |
| 1921 | 649 | −1.1% |
| 1930 | 639 | −1.5% |
| 1950 | 469 | −26.6% |
| 1961 | 447 | −4.7% |
| 1970 | 364 | −18.6% |
| 1980 | 313 | −14.0% |
| 1991 | 234 | −25.2% |
| 2001 | 203 | −13.2% |
| 2011 | 196 | −3.4% |
| 2021 | 242 | +23.5% |
Source: Censuses
