= Church of Saint Michael the Archangel, Prague =

Former church in Prague, Czech Republic

Coordinates: 50°5′11″N 14°25′13″E

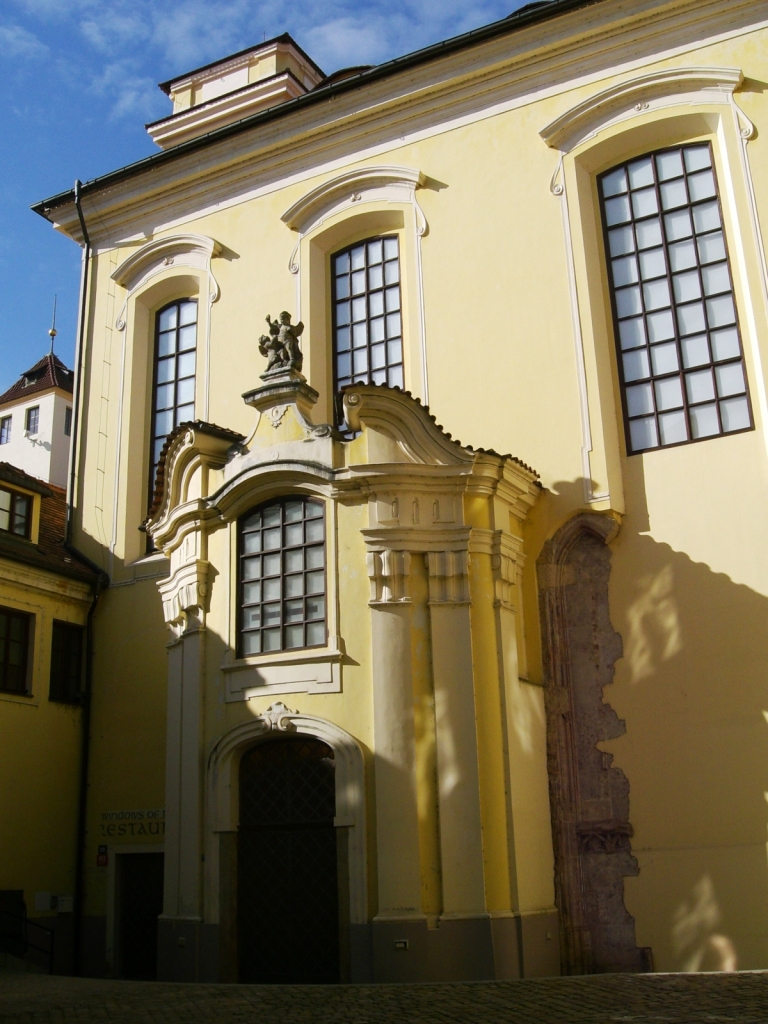
Baroque facade of the church with remnants of Gothic elements (on the right) in 2009

Church of Saint Michael the Archangel (Czech: kostel svatého Michaela archanděla) is a former church in the Old Town district of Prague, Czech Republic. It is consecrated to Saint Michael the Archangel. It was built in Romanesque and Gothic style and later rebuilt in Baroque style. The priest and church reformer Jan Hus celebrated masses in the church. The church and adjacent monastery were disestablished during the reforms of the Emperor Joseph II in the 18th century. Later, the buildings served as a warehouse. In the crypt, there are buried rectors of the Prague University. The former church and the entire former monastery is protected as a cultural monument.
