= Liběšice (Litoměřice District) =

- Municipality
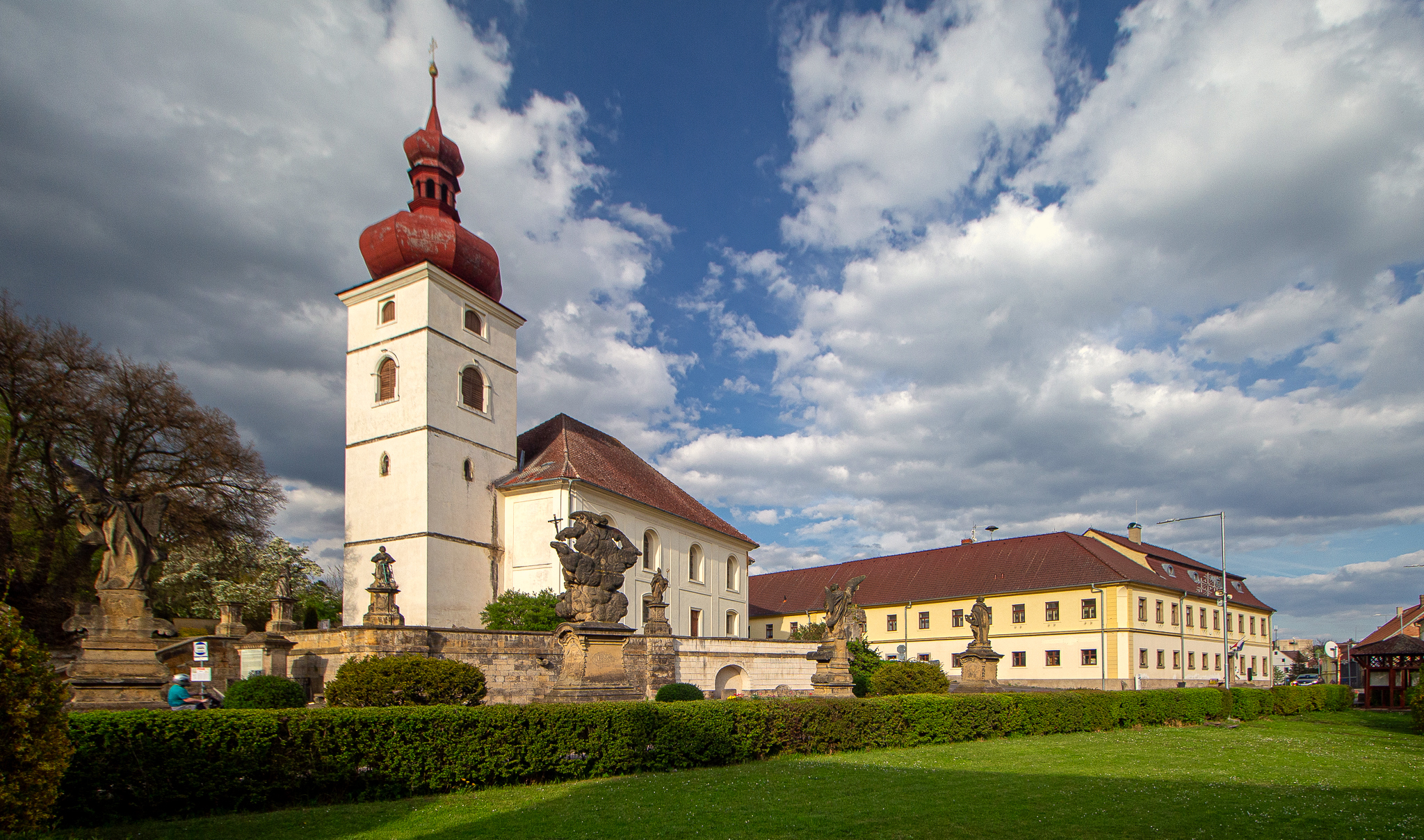
- Church of the Assumption of the Virgin Mary

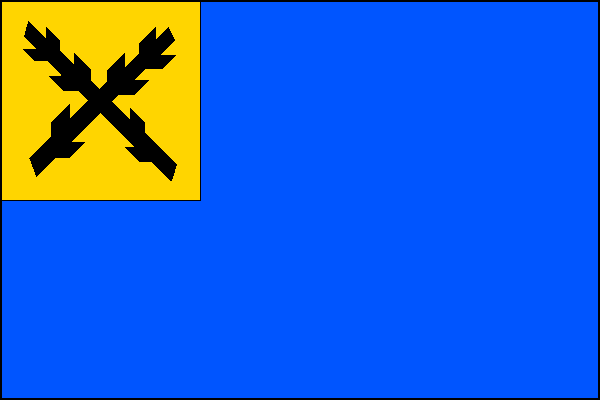
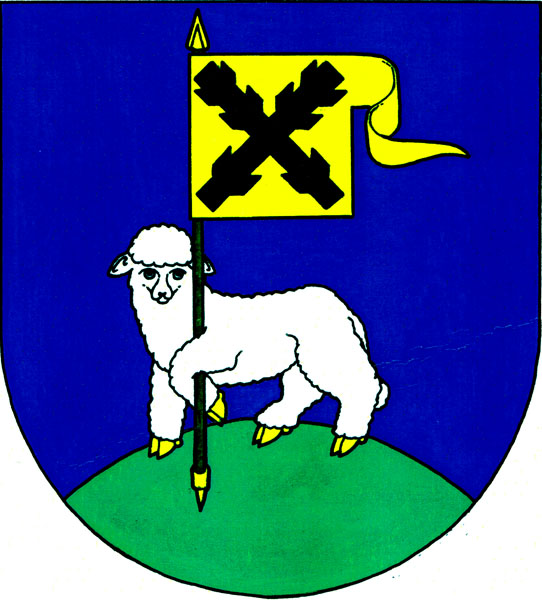
- Flag Coat of arms

- Location in the Czech Republic
- Coordinates: 50°34′8″N 14°17′21″E
- Country: Czech Republic
- Region: Ústí nad Labem
- District: Litoměřice
- First mentioned: 1239

Area
  - Total: 32.24 km^{2} (12.45 sq mi)
- Elevation: 247 m (810 ft)

Population (2026-01-01)
  - Total: 1,525
  - Density: 47.30/km^{2} (122.5/sq mi)
- Time zone: UTC+1 (CET)
  - Summer (DST): UTC+2 (CEST)
- Postal codes: 411 45, 411 46, 412 01
- Website: www.libesice.cz

Liběšice is a municipality and village in Litoměřice District in the Ústí nad Labem Region of the Czech Republic. It has about 1,500 inhabitants.

Liběšice lies approximately 13 kilometres (8 mi) east of Litoměřice, 21 km (13 mi) southeast of Ústí nad Labem, and 55 km (34 mi) north of Prague.

== Administrative division ==
Liběšice consists of 15 municipal parts (in brackets population according to the 2021 census):

- Liběšice (780)
- Dolní Chobolice (90)
- Dolní Nezly (46)
- Dolní Řepčice (26)
- Horní Chobolice (56)
- Horní Nezly (24)
- Jeleč (10)
- Klokoč (5)
- Lhotsko (11)
- Mladé (44)
- Nová Vesnička (0)
- Soběnice (160)
- Srdov (65)
- Trnobrany (81)
- Zimoř (52)

== Demographics ==
Historical population
| Year | Pop. | ±% |
|---|---|---|
| 1869 | 2,873 | — |
| 1880 | 3,089 | +7.5% |
| 1890 | 2,970 | −3.9% |
| 1900 | 2,895 | −2.5% |
| 1910 | 2,906 | +0.4% |
| 1921 | 2,764 | −4.9% |
| 1930 | 2,638 | −4.6% |
| 1950 | 1,663 | −37.0% |
| 1961 | 1,942 | +16.8% |
| 1970 | 1,727 | −11.1% |
| 1980 | 1,639 | −5.1% |
| 1991 | 1,373 | −16.2% |
| 2001 | 1,402 | +2.1% |
| 2011 | 1,549 | +10.5% |
| 2021 | 1,450 | −6.4% |
Source: Censuses
