= Horní Újezd =

Horní Újezd may refer to places in the Czech Republic:

- Horní Újezd (Přerov District), a municipality and village in the Olomouc Region
- Horní Újezd (Svitavy District), a municipality and village in the Pardubice Region
- Horní Újezd (Třebíč District), a municipality and village in the Vysočina Region
