= Hana Hamplová =

MG.A Hana Hamplová
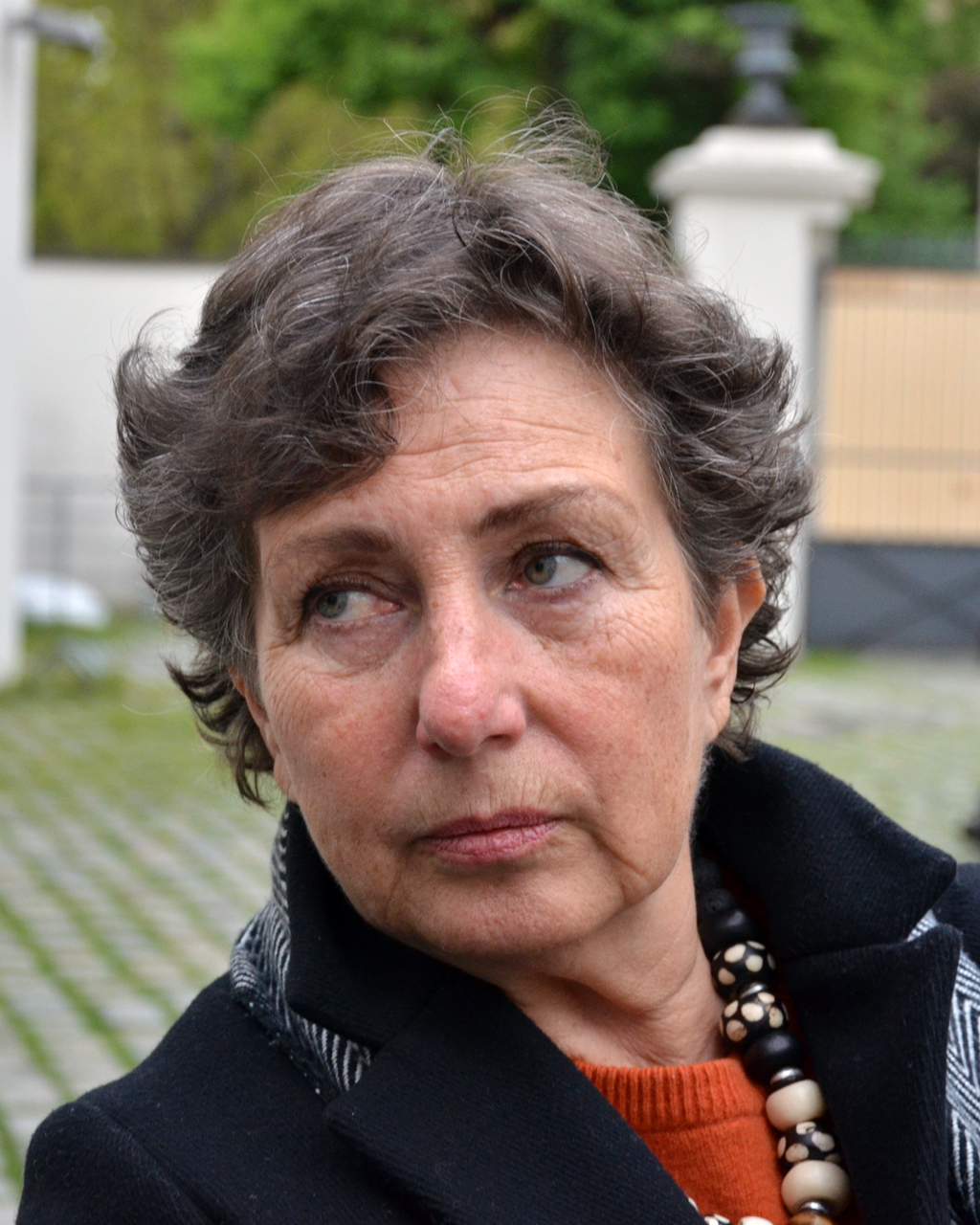
- Hamplová in 2017
- Born: Hana Hovorková; 28 June 1951 (age 75); Prague, Czechoslovakia
- Education: Film and TV School of the Academy of Performing Arts in Prague
- Known for: Cinematographer and freelance photographer
- Notable work: Portraits, free photographic art, photographic reproduction on art
- Spouse: Josef Hampl (1978–2019)

Hana Hamplová (née Hovorková; born 28 June 1951) is a Czech cinematographer and photographer. She graduated from Film and TV School of the Academy of Performing Arts in Prague with a degree in cinematography. In the 1970s, she worked briefly as a cinematographer for Czechoslovak Television, and later began working as a freelance photographer. She is a member of the Association of Professional Photographers of the Czech Republic (member of Federation of European Professional Photographers). From 2006 to 2015, she taught at Michael, a private school for advertising and the arts.

== Life ==
She was born Hana Hovorková on 28 June 1951 in Prague. As a child she spent the years 1956–1958 with her family in Beijing, where her father worked as a manager on the construction of film studios. In 1958, her father died in a plane crash while returning from Beijing; Hana Hamplová continued to grow up with only her mother and older brother Jan.

After graduating from elementary school, she attended the Nad Štolou High School in Letná from 1966 to 1969. From the age of sixteen, she developed an interest in photography and attended a photography club at the Biskupcova People’s School of Art under the guidance of Ján Šmok. In August 1968, during the invasion by Warsaw Pact troops, she photographed the events unfolding in the streets of Prague, and in January 1969, she photographed the funeral of Jan Palach. In an interview for Memory of Nations, she describes the August invasion and normalization as a turning point. According to her, the relaxed atmosphere of the Prague Spring and the subsequent tightening of conditions was a moment that fundamentally influenced her entire generation. After graduating from high school, she worked for a year as a technical assistant at Czechoslovak Television.

In 1971 she successfully passed the entrance exam for the Department of Cinematography at FAMU. In 1974 she met Josef Hampl, whom she married in 1978. Hampl was a close friend of Vladimír Boudník and Bohumil Hrabal, and during the normalization period, he introduced her to the circle of Czechoslovak visual artists. She met Jiří Kolář and his circle of friends, who used to gather at the Café Slavia. She collaborated with programmer Vladimír Pistorius on publishing books in the samizdat series Krameriova expedice 1978 (a total of 107 titles in 130 volumes from 1978 to 1990), where she contributed to the graphic and visual design. She took portraits of authors for samizdat and documented unofficial exhibitions.

After graduating in 1978 she worked as an assistant to cinematographer Jan Osten at Czechoslovak Television. After the birth of her daughter, she began working as a freelance photographer. Because she had studied cinematography rather than photography, she was unable to officially register her work. From 1985 to 1990, she was employed as a professional photographer at a dermatology clinic in Prague. In November 1989, she photographed demonstrations on Wenceslas Square. In April 1990, the Odeon publishing house commissioned her to reproduce the works of Jiří Kolář, who was still living in Paris at the time, for a monograph in the preparation. Since 1990, she has devoted herself entirely to photographing works of art for galleries, catalogs, and monographs.

Through Susanna Roth, a Swiss translator of the works of Hrabal and Kundera, she met Ladislav Matějka, head of the Department of Slavic Languages at the University of Michigan in Ann Arbor. Thanks to connection with Martha Mehta and her husband, pianist and professor at Eastern Michigan University Dady Mehta, she held three photography exhibitions at the local Museum of Art between 1990 and 2015 (two of them together with Josef Hampl). From 1998 to 2002, she served as chair of the board of directors of the Prague House of Photography. From 2006 to 2015, she taught photography at Michael, a private school of advertising and the arts.

== Work ==
A major impetus for her free creative photographic work was the design of the cover for the Bohumil Hrabal’s book Too Loud a Solitude, published in 1976 as samizdat. Hamplová works consistently with photography’s inherent expressive means and does not make any additional alterations to the negative or manipulate the positive in the darkroom to achieve special effects. This approach has not changed even with the transition to digital photography.

The magic of her photographs lies in her artistic sensibility and her focus on specific details. Amid the apparent chaos of disordered shapes, the selected and greatly magnified detail ceases to appear as mere randomness and becomes a new reality. Hamplová is interested in the aesthetic impact of the structures themselves and in a new interpretation of a fragment of everyday reality. She does not seek hidden meanings that might resemble objects, people, or landscapes. She finds elements of tension in the unexpected encounters of diverse materials, in a torn surface, and in the disrupted rhythm of the arrangement of lines. In her free photographic work, Hana Hamplová primarily chooses black-and-white or muted color palettes for her images. She captures small details of what she sees—wall surfaces, the folds of fabric, layers of corrugated cardboard, the weave of wire mesh, and the play of light and shadow on stone masonry. Her artistic vision is characterized by a complex combination of lines and tonal intensity. She strips the photographed subjects of their context and creates abstract compositions whose lyrical minimalism is reminiscent of the arte povera movement.

While designing the cover for Hrabal's book Too Loud a Solitude, she found inspiration for an entire photographic series in a recycling center, where Mrs. Hrabal was working at the time. For the exhibition "The Recycled World" at the University of Michigan (1990), she selected photographs depicting art books disintegrating amid bales of shredded paper as a metaphor for the fragility of human knowledge and memory.

=== Free creation (selection) ===
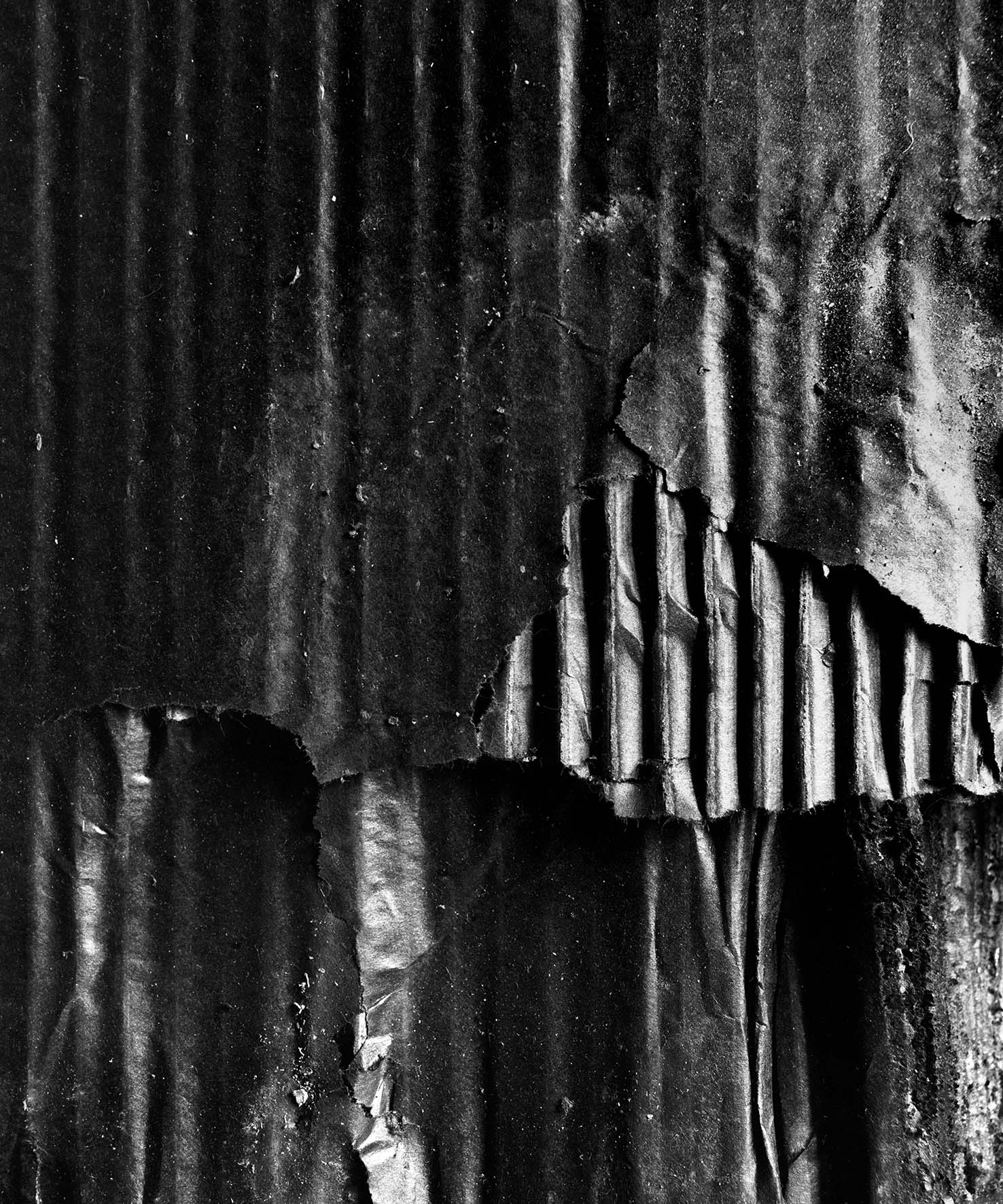
Hana Hamplová 1980 Untitled, analog 60x50 cm

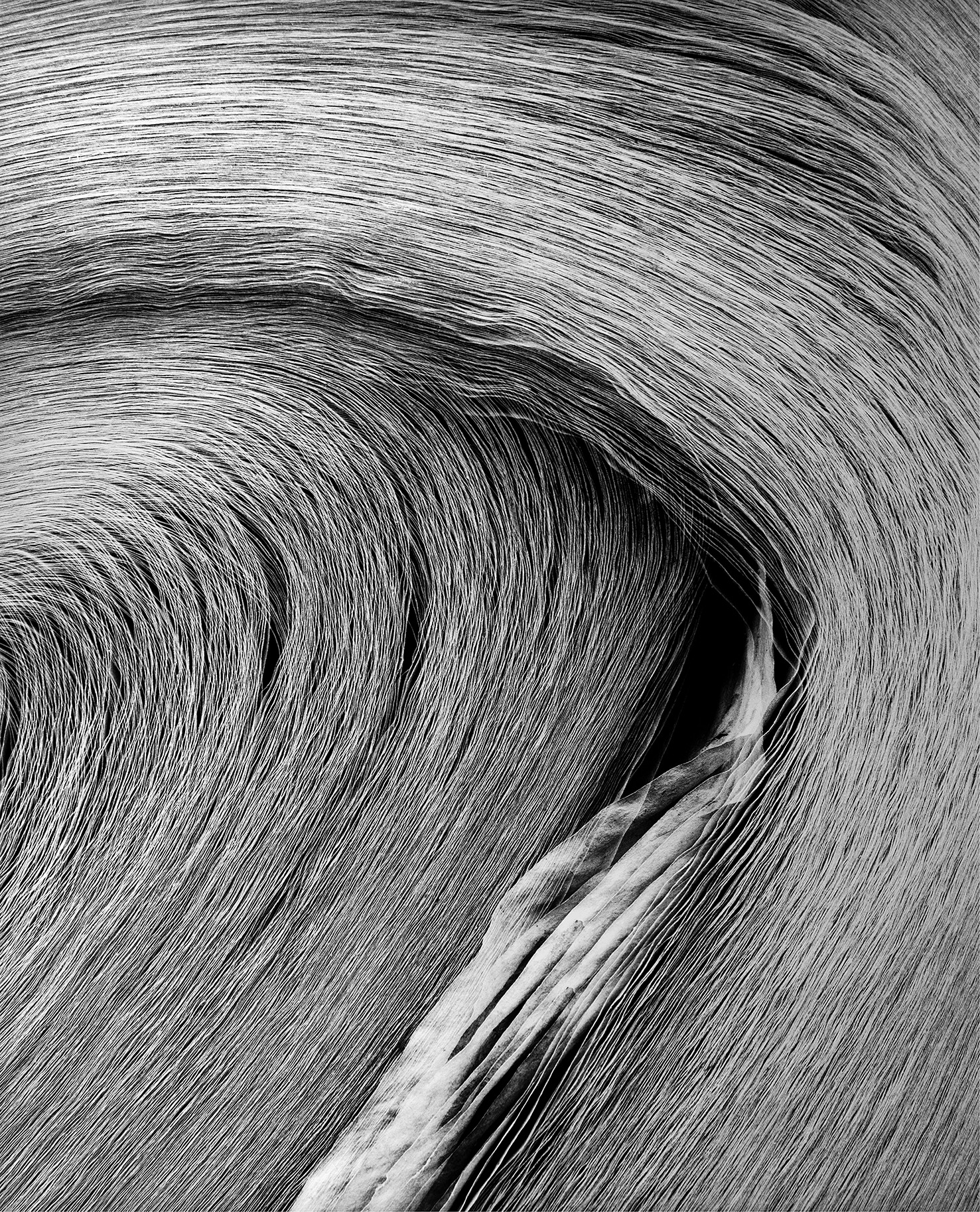
Hana Hamplová 1980 Untitled (3), analog 60x50cm

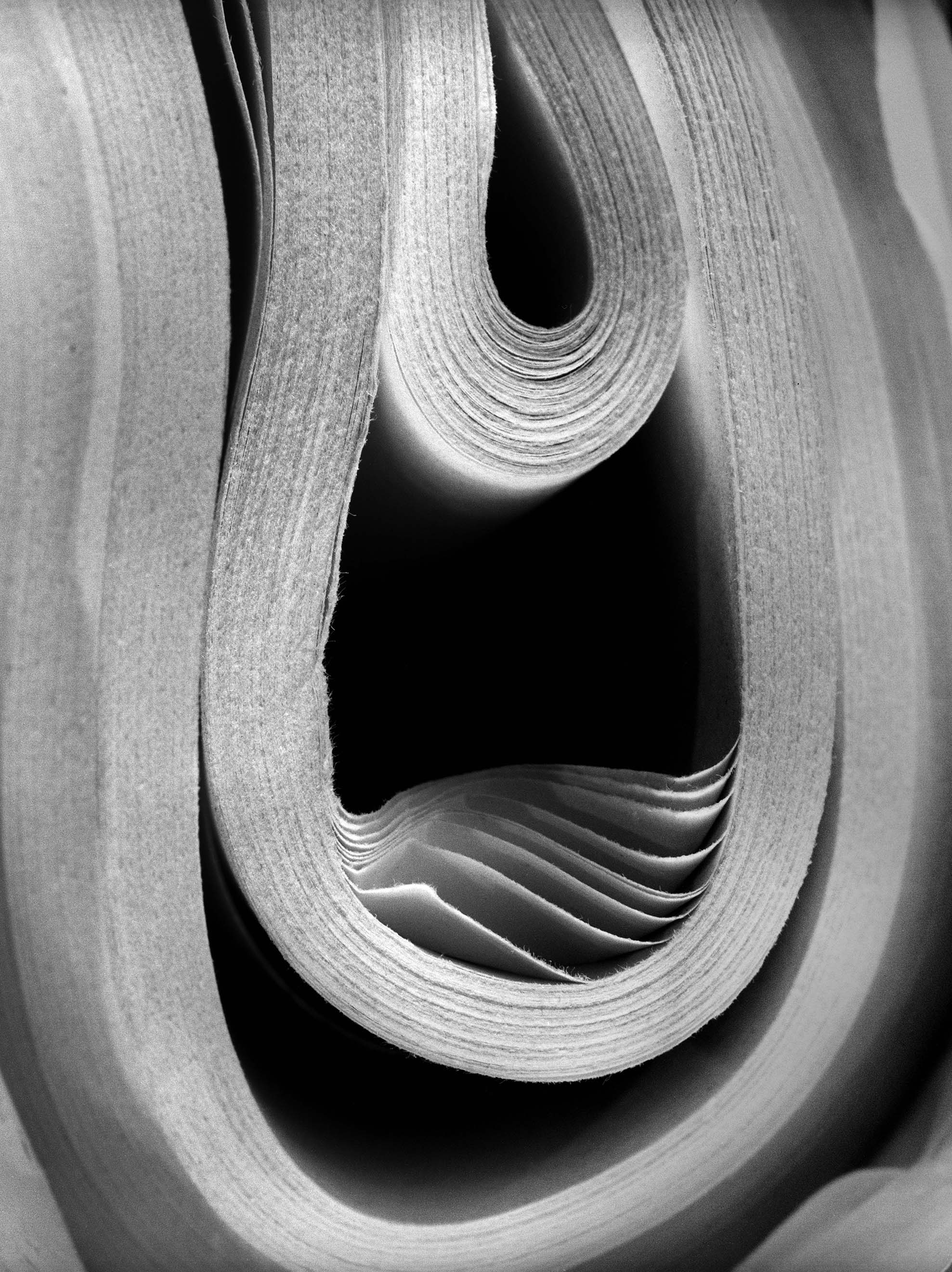
Hana Hamplová 1981 Untitled, 60x50cm

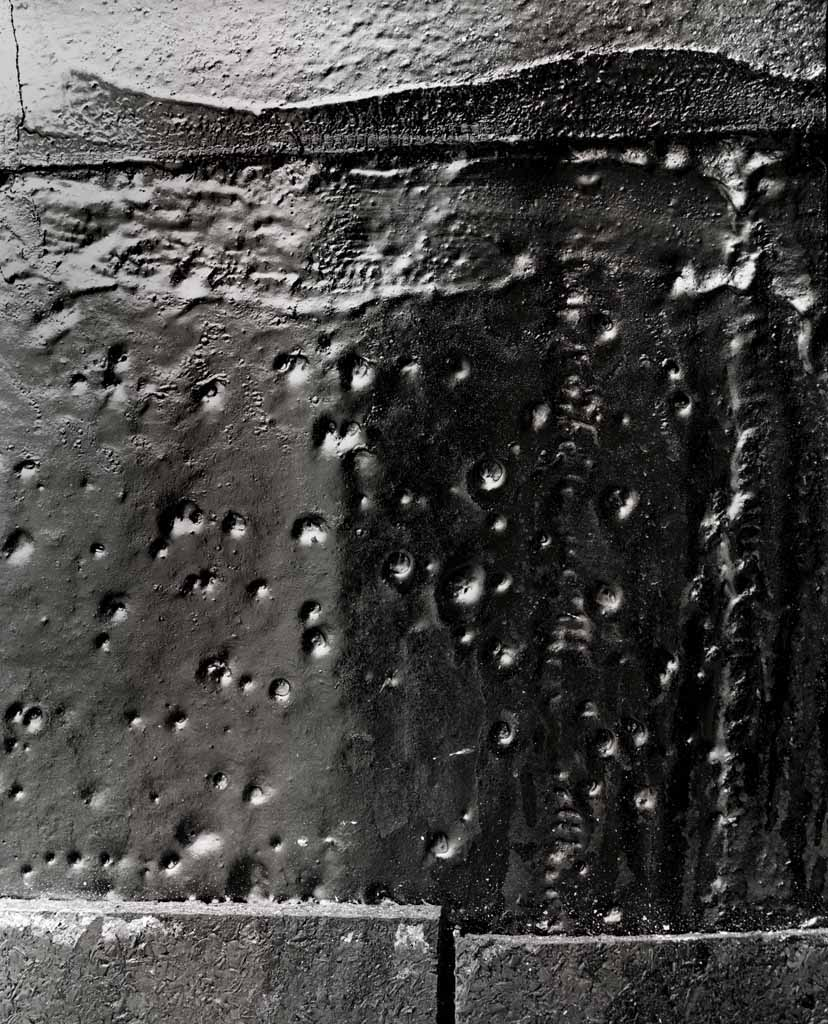
Hana Hamplová 1982 Untitled (25)

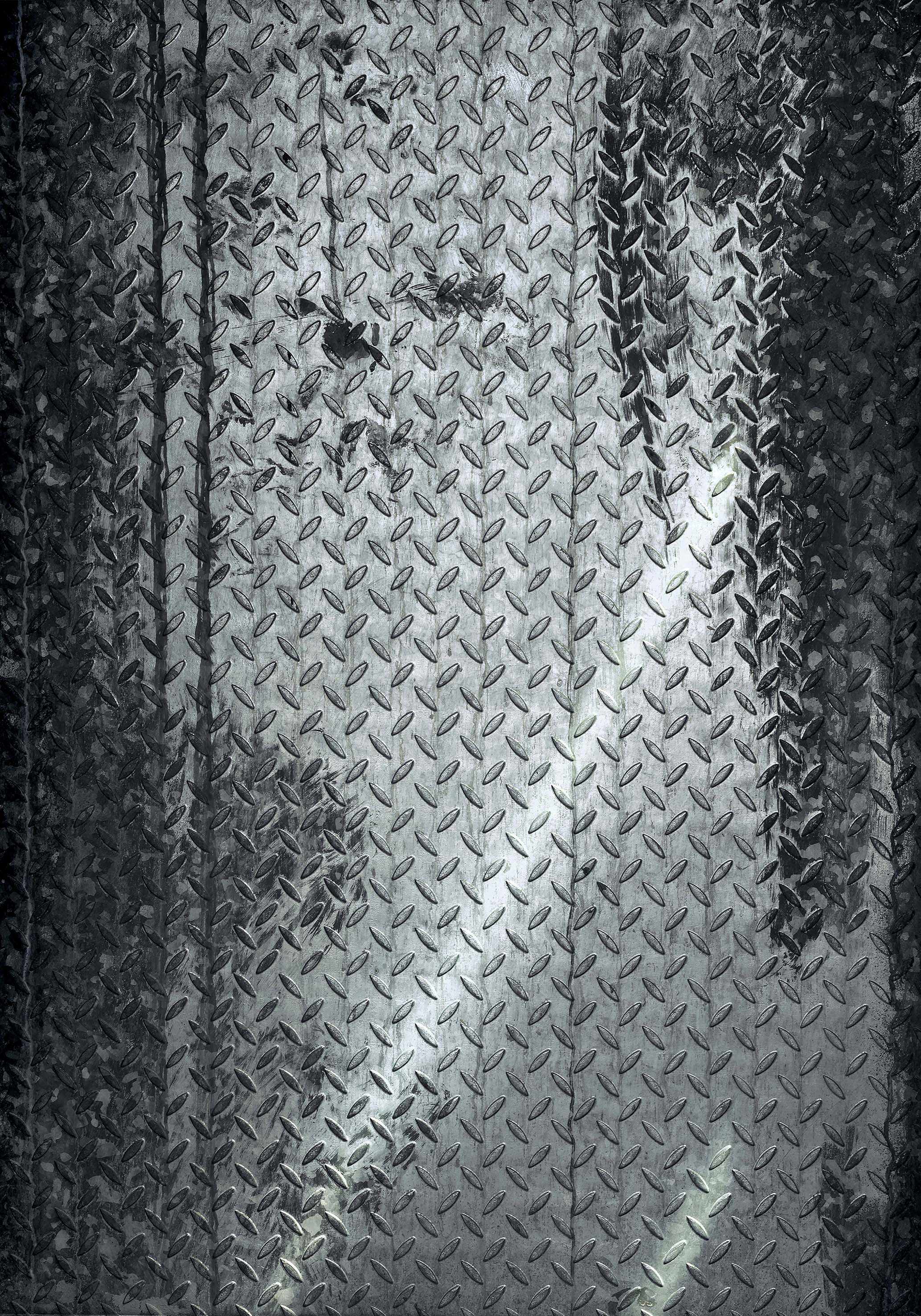
Hana Hamplová 2023 Untitled, digital photo 100x70cm

She regularly returns to the theme of paper and its materiality. By abstracting from the function of paper, she evokes both familiar and entirely new associations with the structure of wood or abstract landscapes. She has created two thematically unified series, the first of which emphasizes the tranquility and harmony of layered, isolated elements, while the second, which makes use of torn or burnt paper, expresses existential unease, change, and decay. In a series of large-format color photographs (100 x 70 cm), Hamplová captured the gradual destruction of the regular grid pattern of corrugated fiberboard by fire, the transformation of its colors through a spectrum of browns, and the final jumble of black, charred remnants. For American critic Roger Green, Hana Hamplová’s photographs represent a timeless and universal testimony to life under a totalitarian regime. Artists such as Alberto Burri and Svatopluk Klimeš have used fire as a symbol of both eternally burning life and destructive power in the visual arts. Jan Kříž describes Hana Hamplová’s technically brilliant series of photographs as a lasting contribution to Czech art in his review.

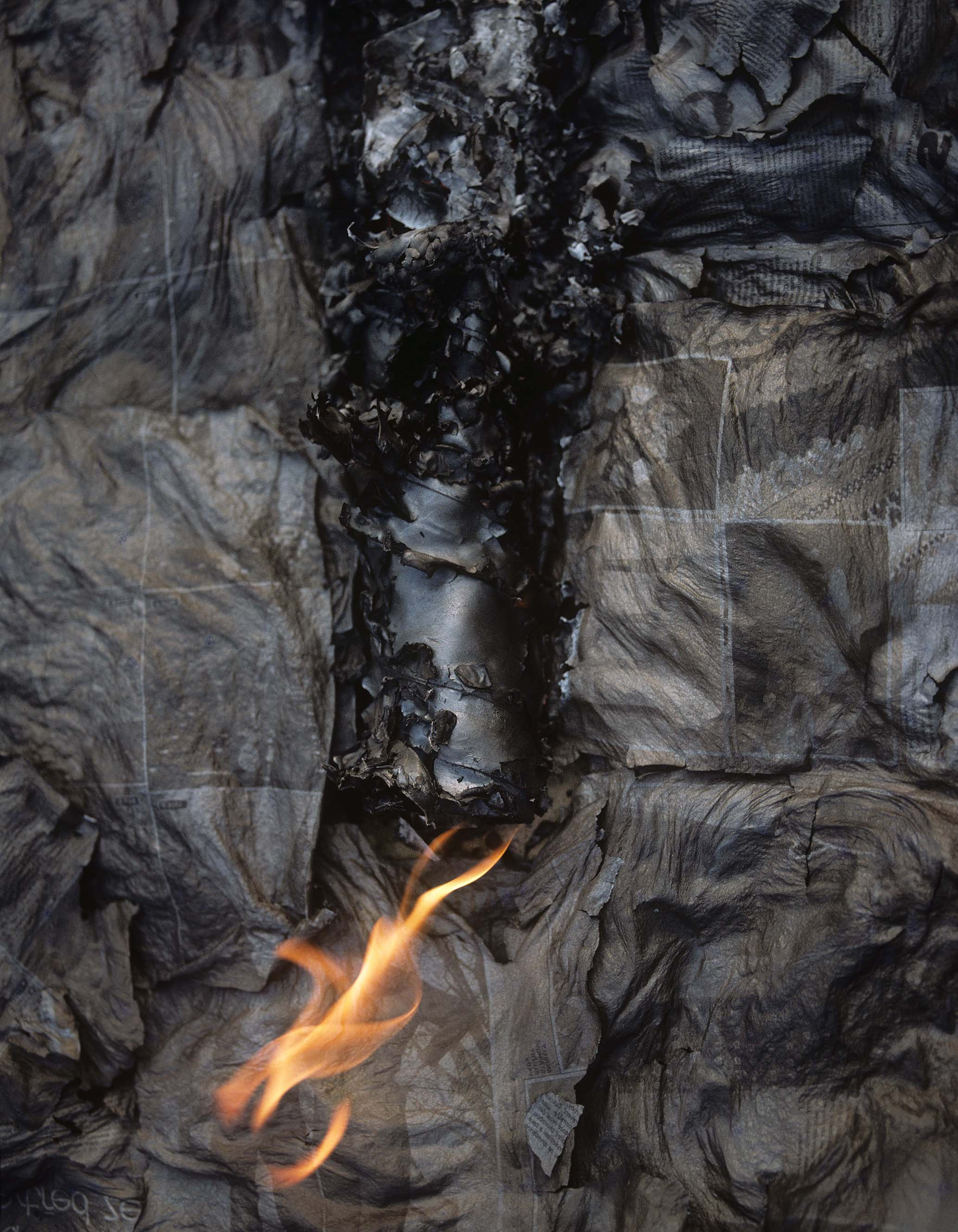
Hana Hamplová 1989 Untitled, analog 90x70cm

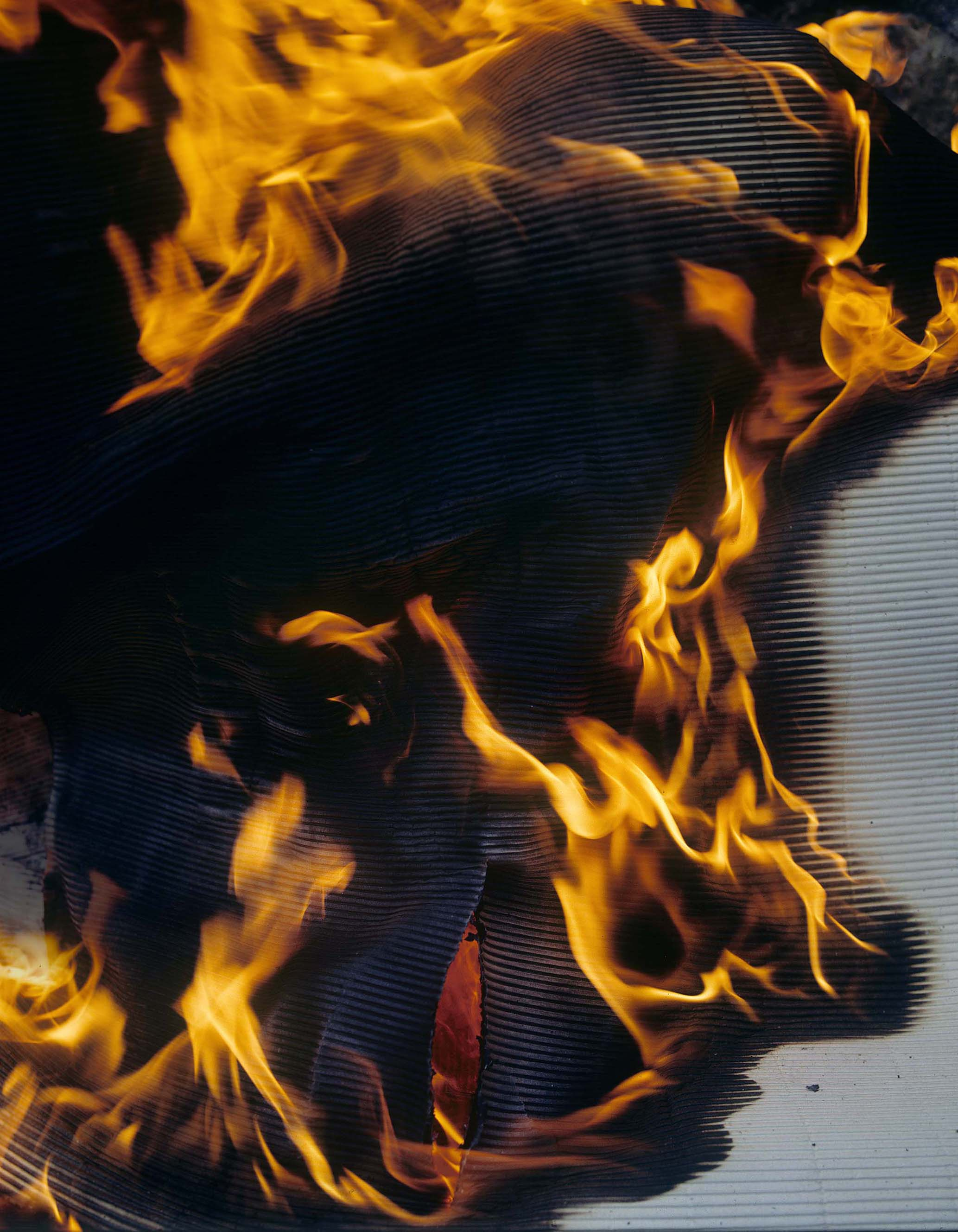
Hana Hamplová 1991 Untitled, analog 90x70cm

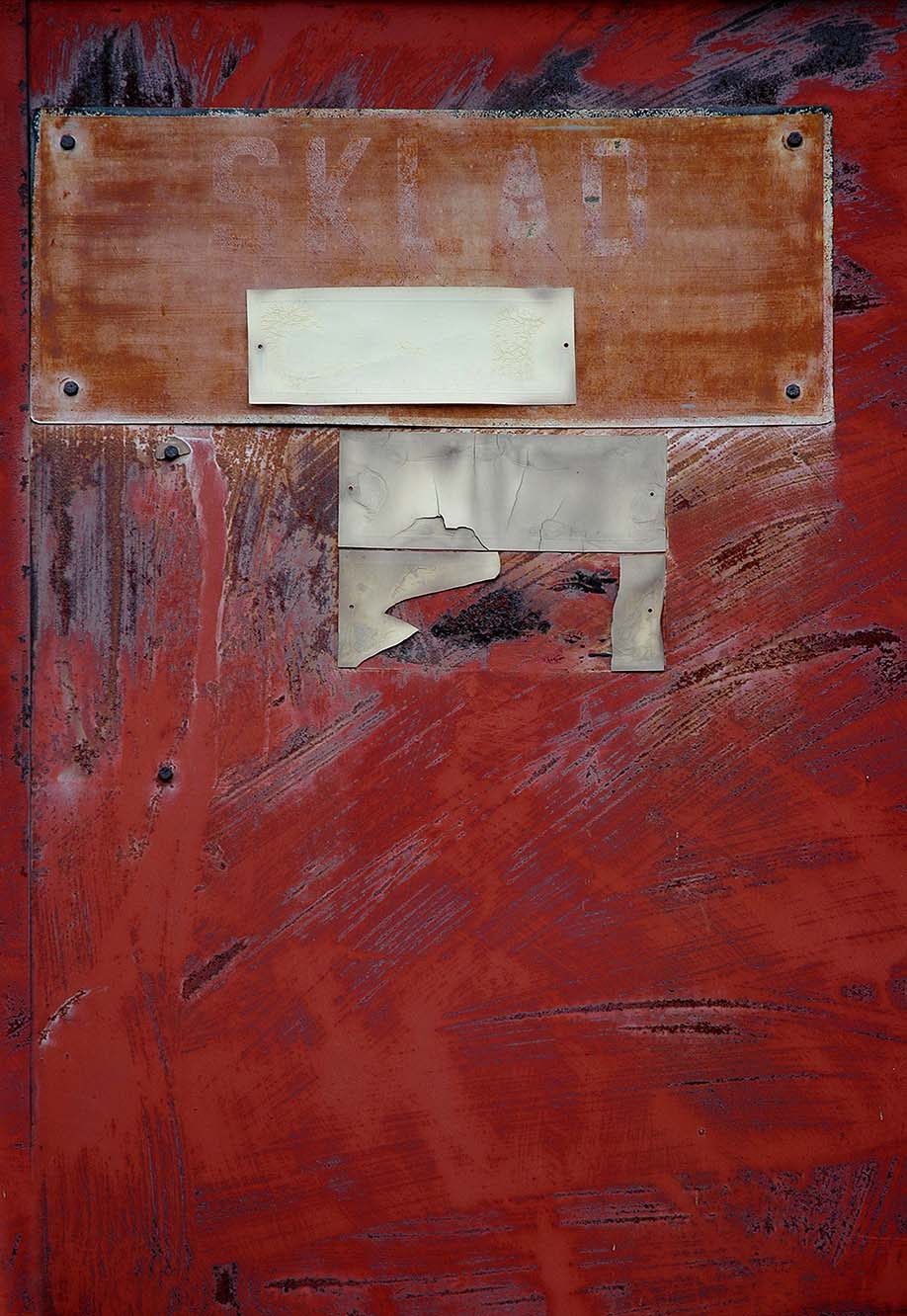
Hana Hamplová 2006 Untitled digital photo 100x70cm

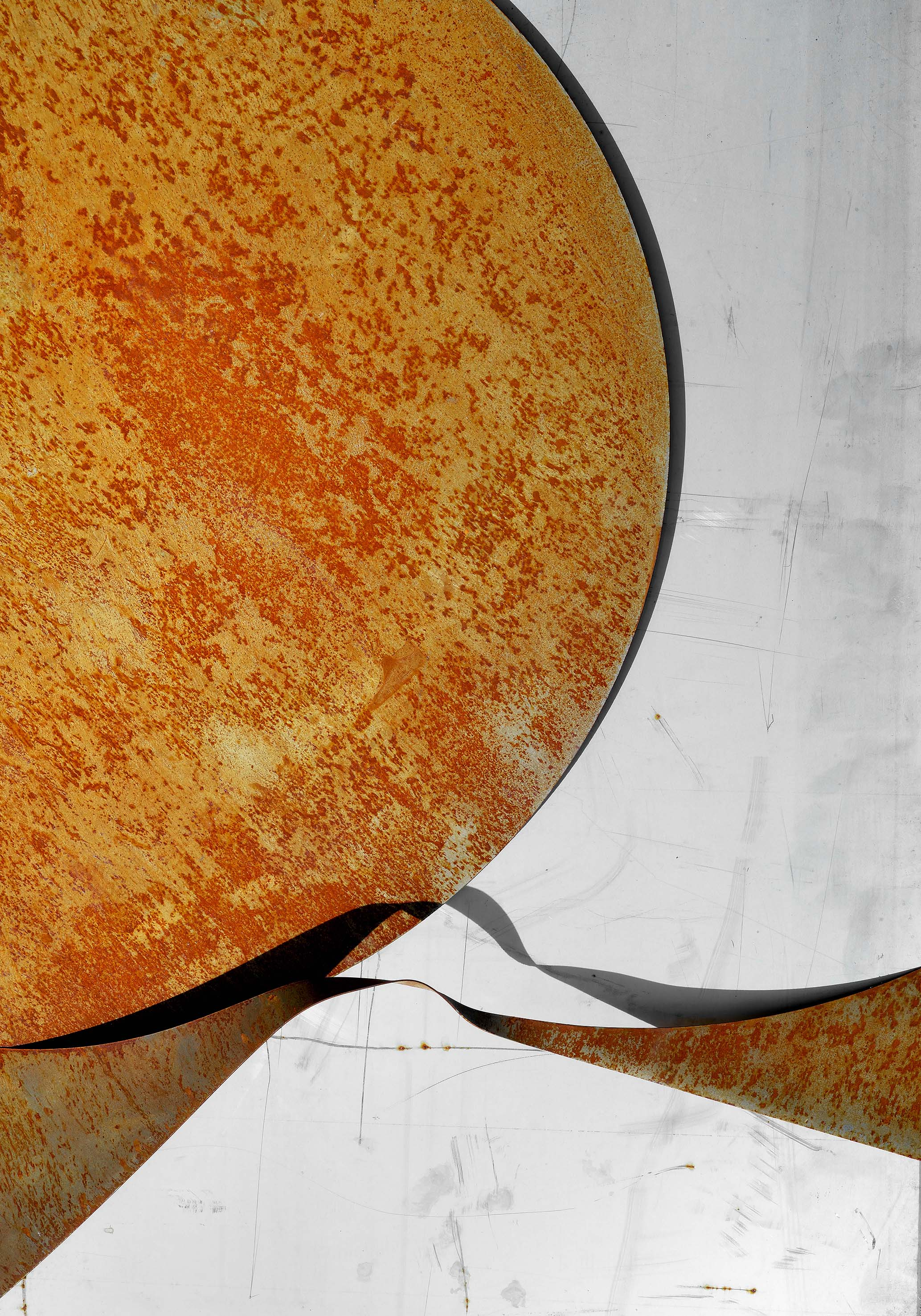
Hana Hamplová 2016 Untitled (2), digi foto 100x70cm

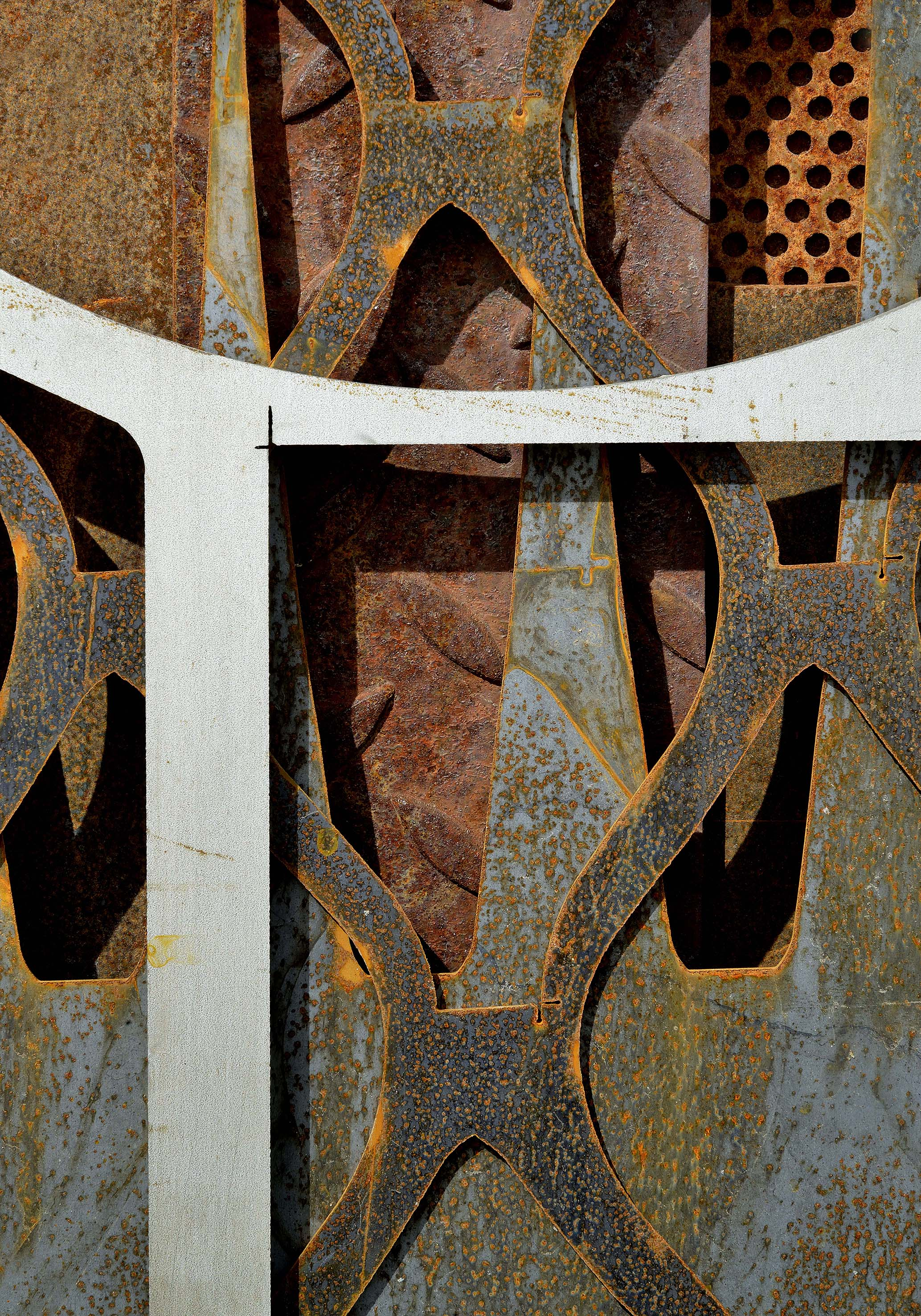
Hana Hamplová 2020 Untitled, digital photo 100x70cm

On the website of the Association of Professional Photographers of the Czech Republic, Hana Hamplová described her work as follows: “In my personal work, I capture the exciting compositions we encounter every day. Photography has the ability to extract them from their surroundings, emphasize the details, and convey my experience to others. I don’t seek similarities with any kind of reality, as we used to see in surrealist photography. I try to make the captured image speak for itself. That’s also why I don’t feel a strong need to name my photographs. For many years, I’ve made my living photographing reproductions of paintings and artworks by contemporary artists, as well as sculptures, objects, and installations.” A connection to the aesthetics and outlook on life of both older generations and her own generation of artists can be seen in the individual photographs, through which she pays tribute to Jiří Hilmar, Josef Hampl, Jitka Svobodová, Václav Stratil, and Čestmír Kafka.

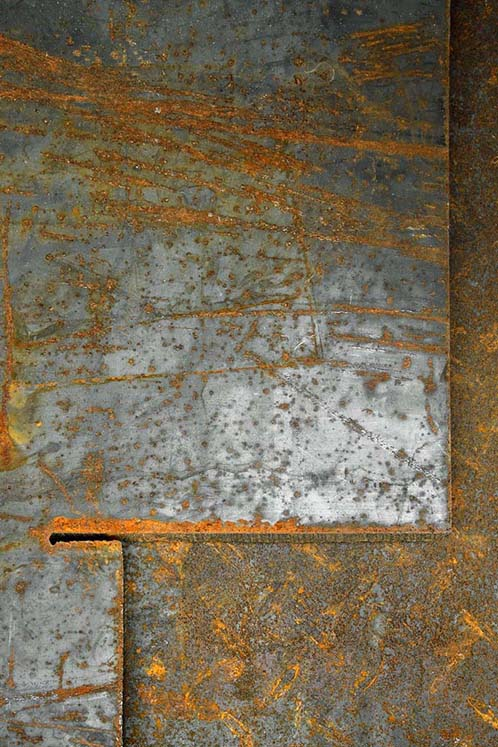
Hana Hamplová 2020 Untitled 100x70cm (2)

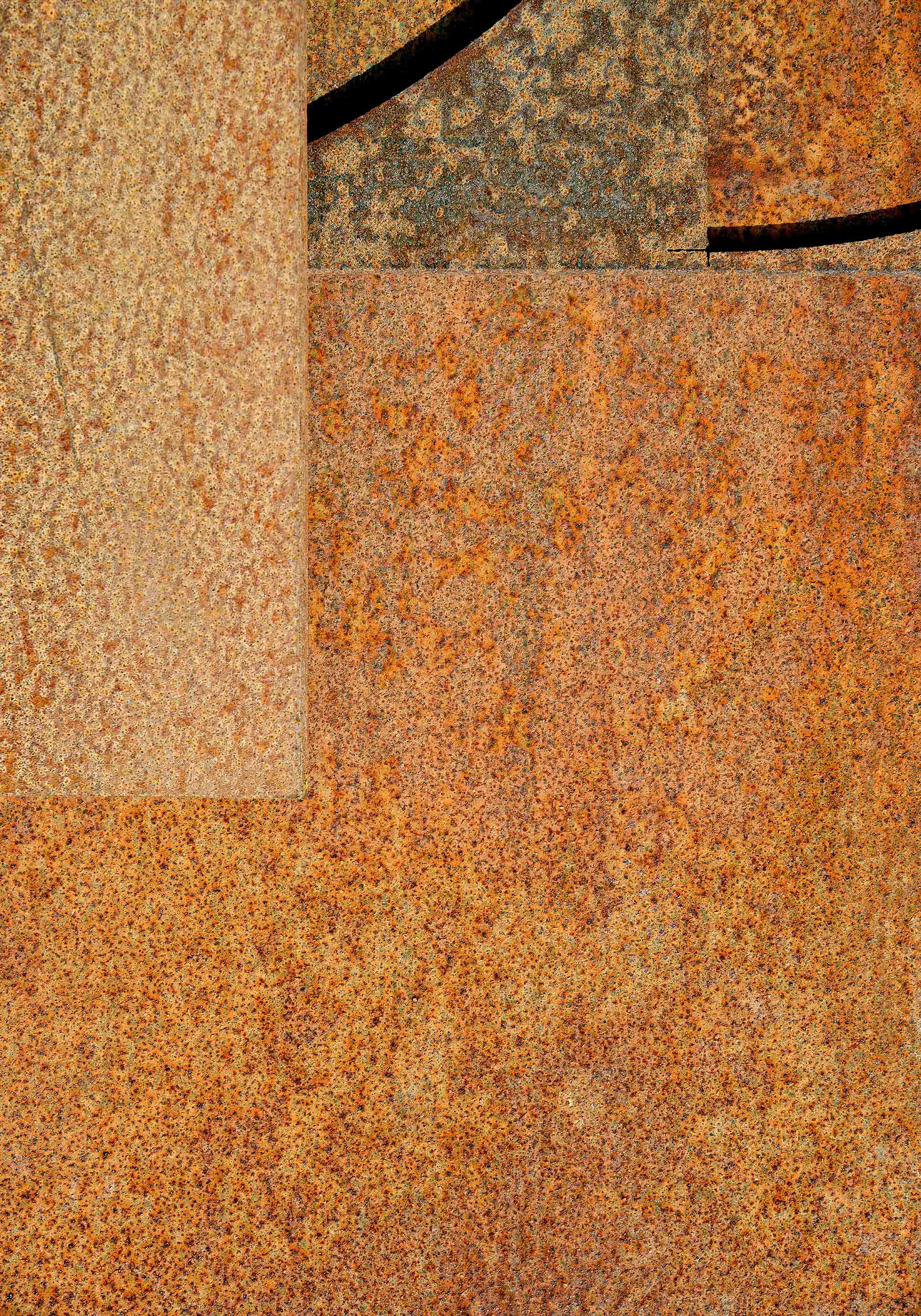
Hana Hamplová, 2023 Untitled 100x70cm (2)

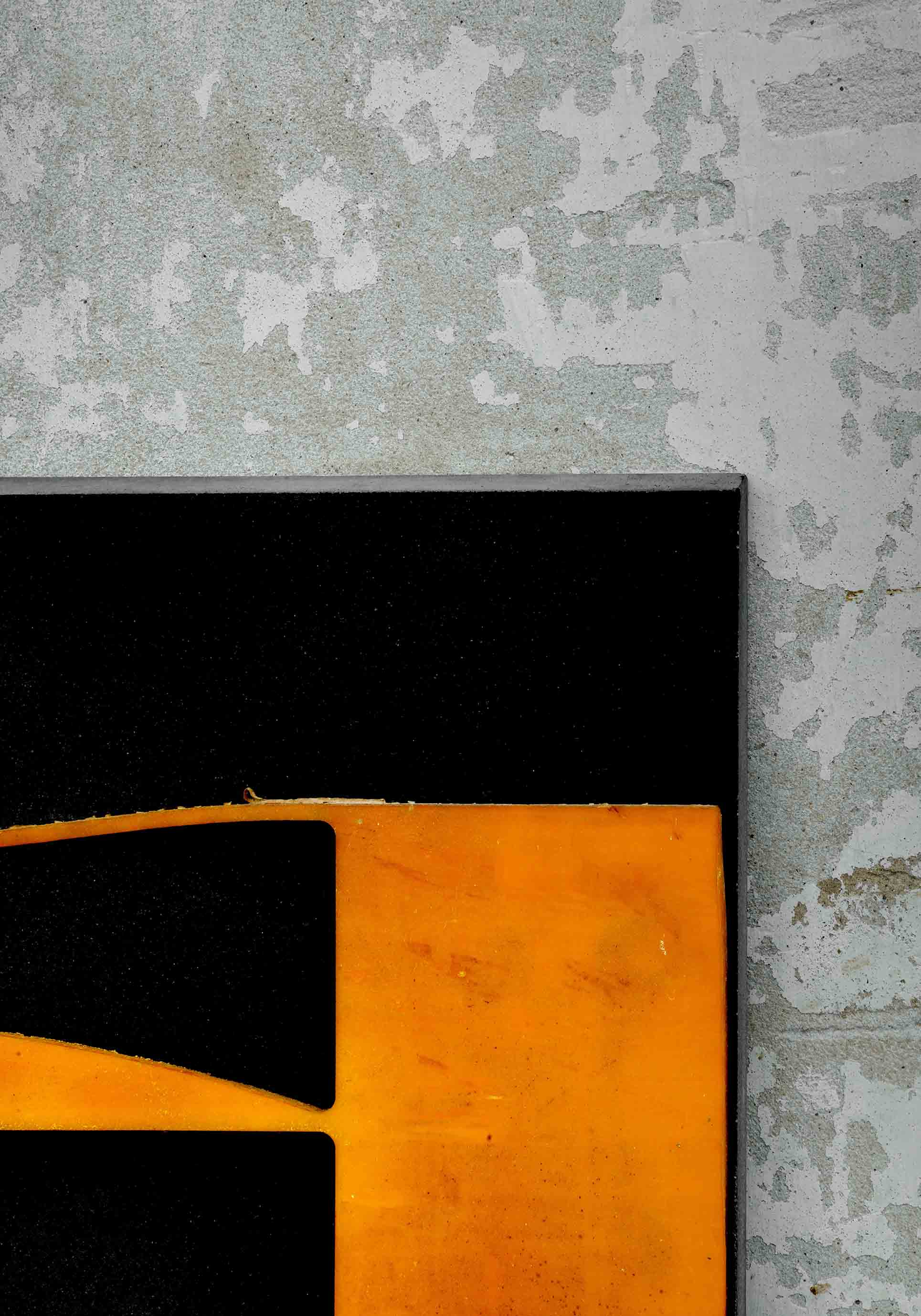
Hana Hamplová, 2023 Untitled 100x70cm (3)

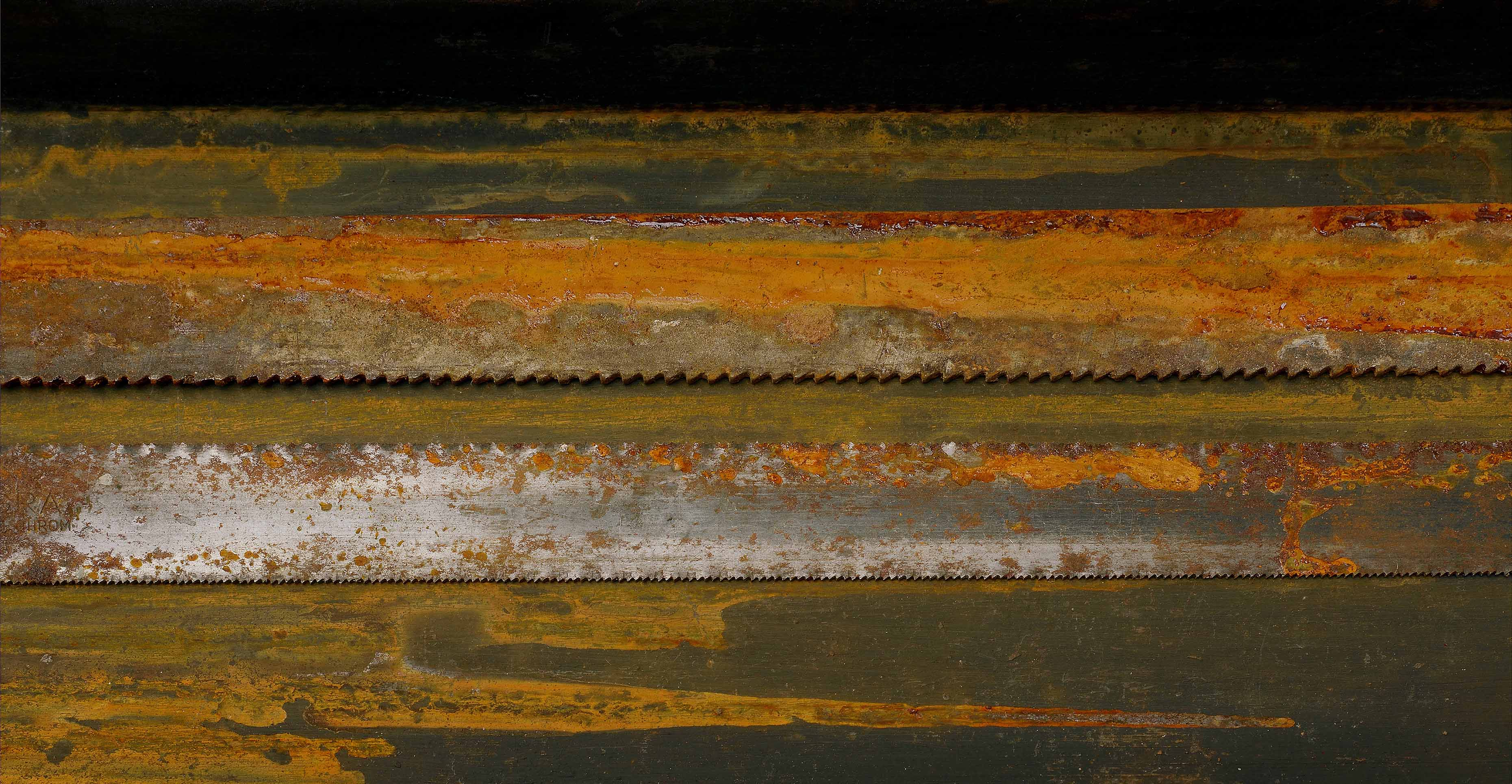
Hana Hamplová 2025 Untitled 70x135 cm

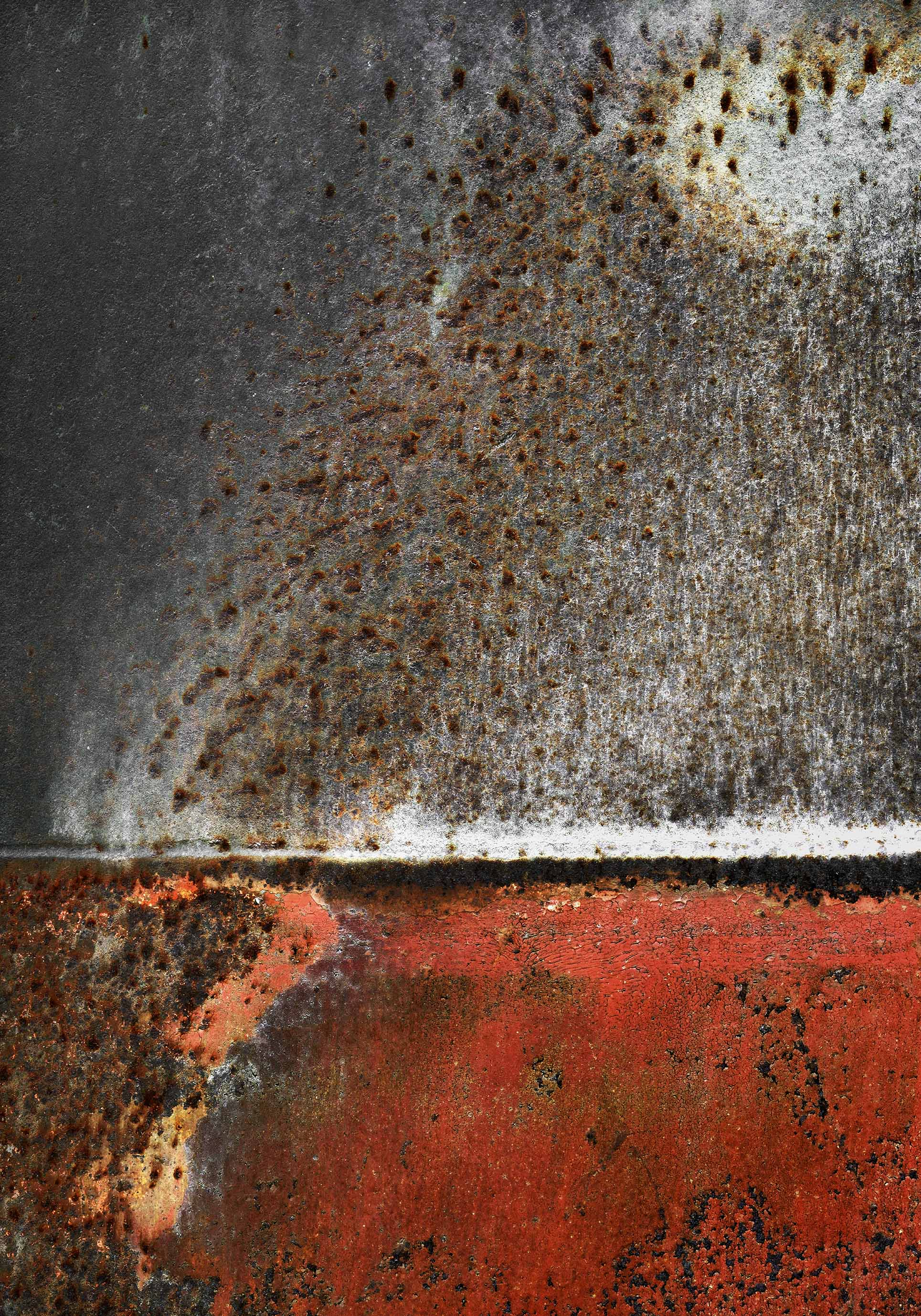
Hana Hamplová 2025 Untitled 100x70cm

=== Filmography ===
- 1974 Sirius (second camera)
- 1974 Člověk jako "M" (second camera)
- 1975 Zn.: „3+1, Praha“ (second camera)
- 1977 Malér (camera)

==== Portraits (selection) ====
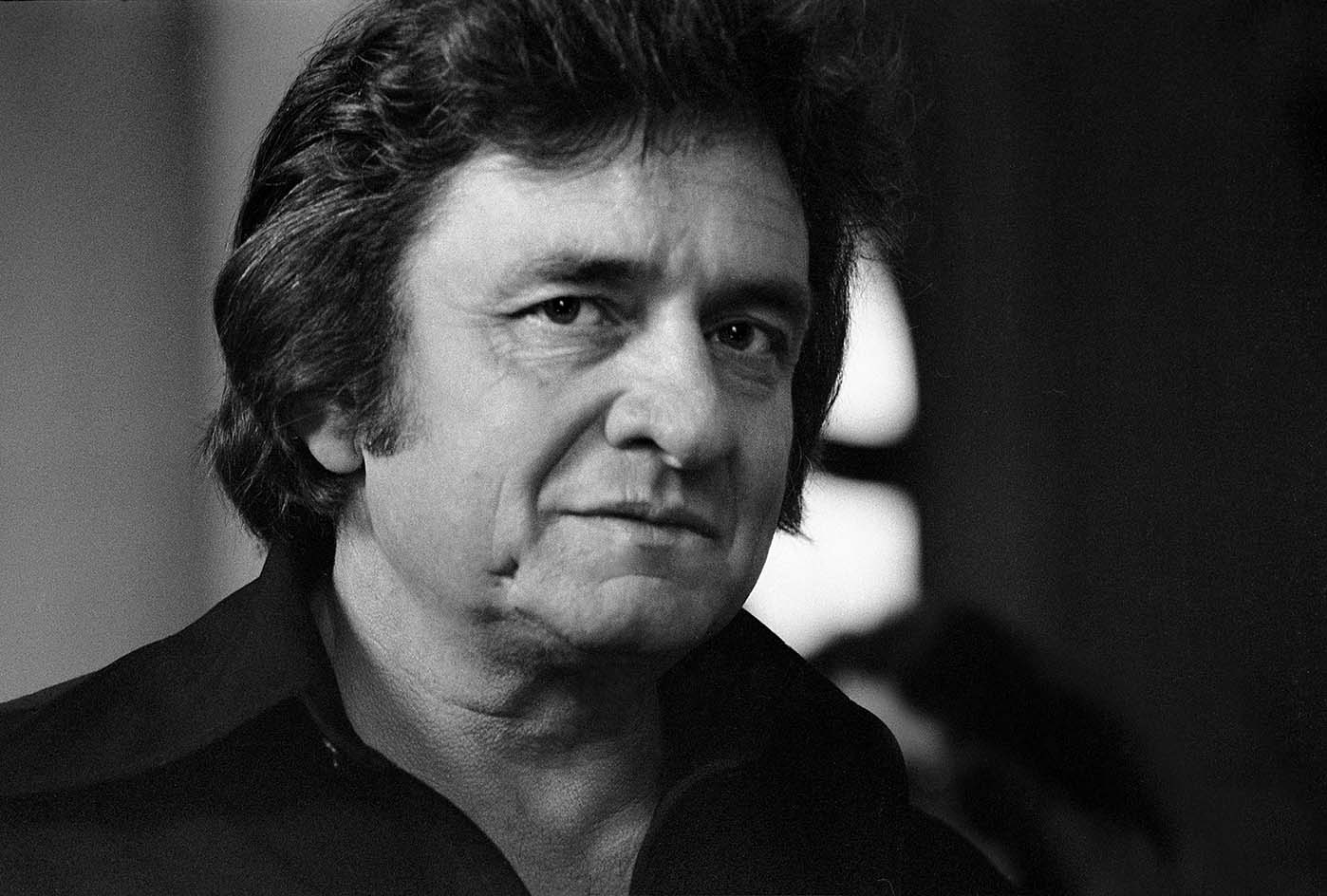
Johny Cash in Prague 1978

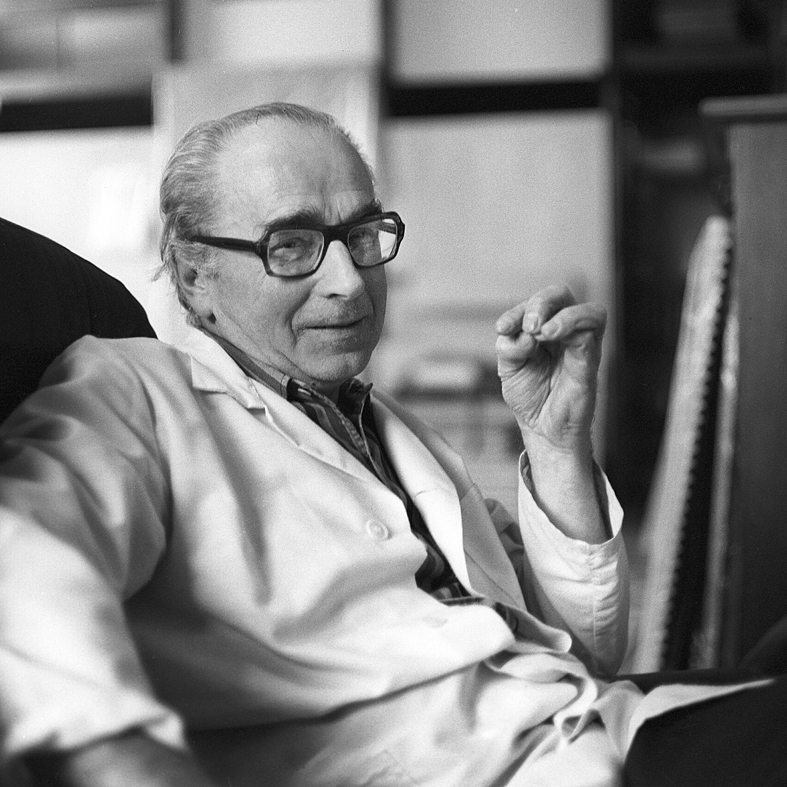
Jiří Kolář (1979)

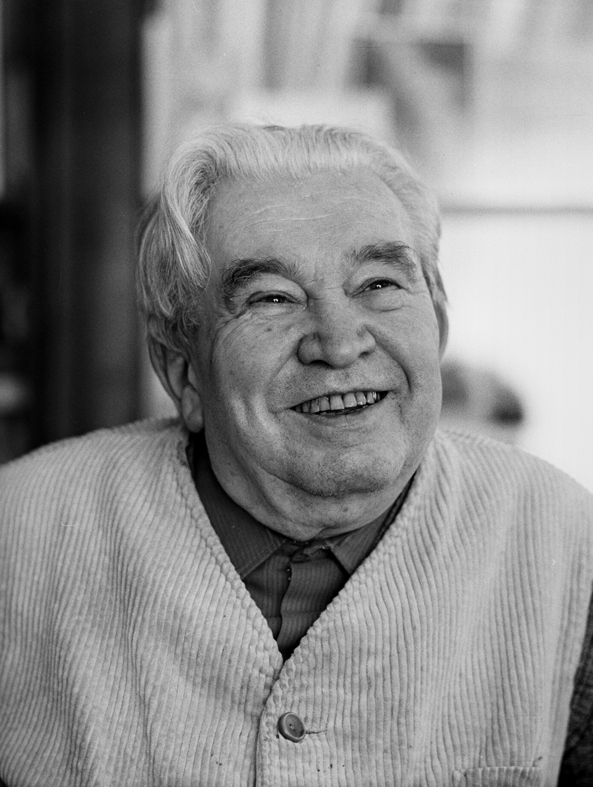
Jaroslav Seifert (1981)

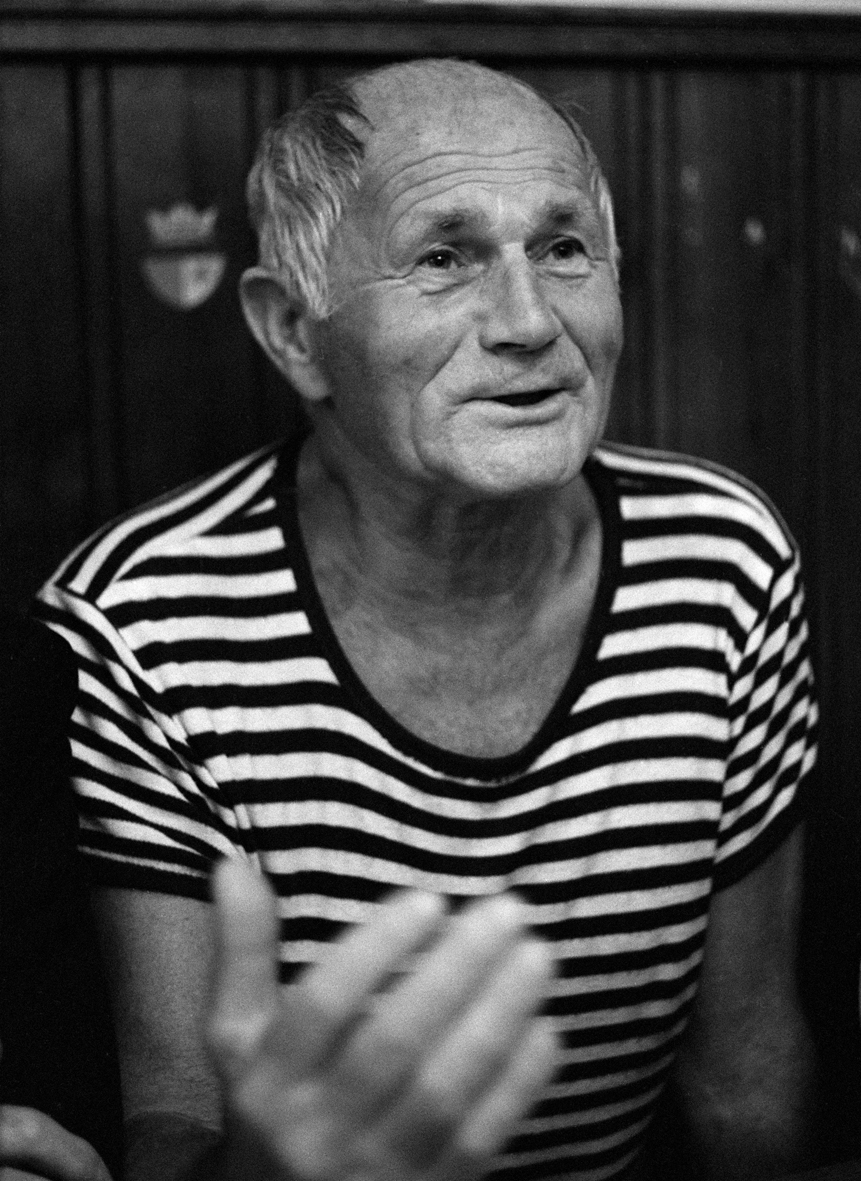
Bohumil Hrabal (1985)

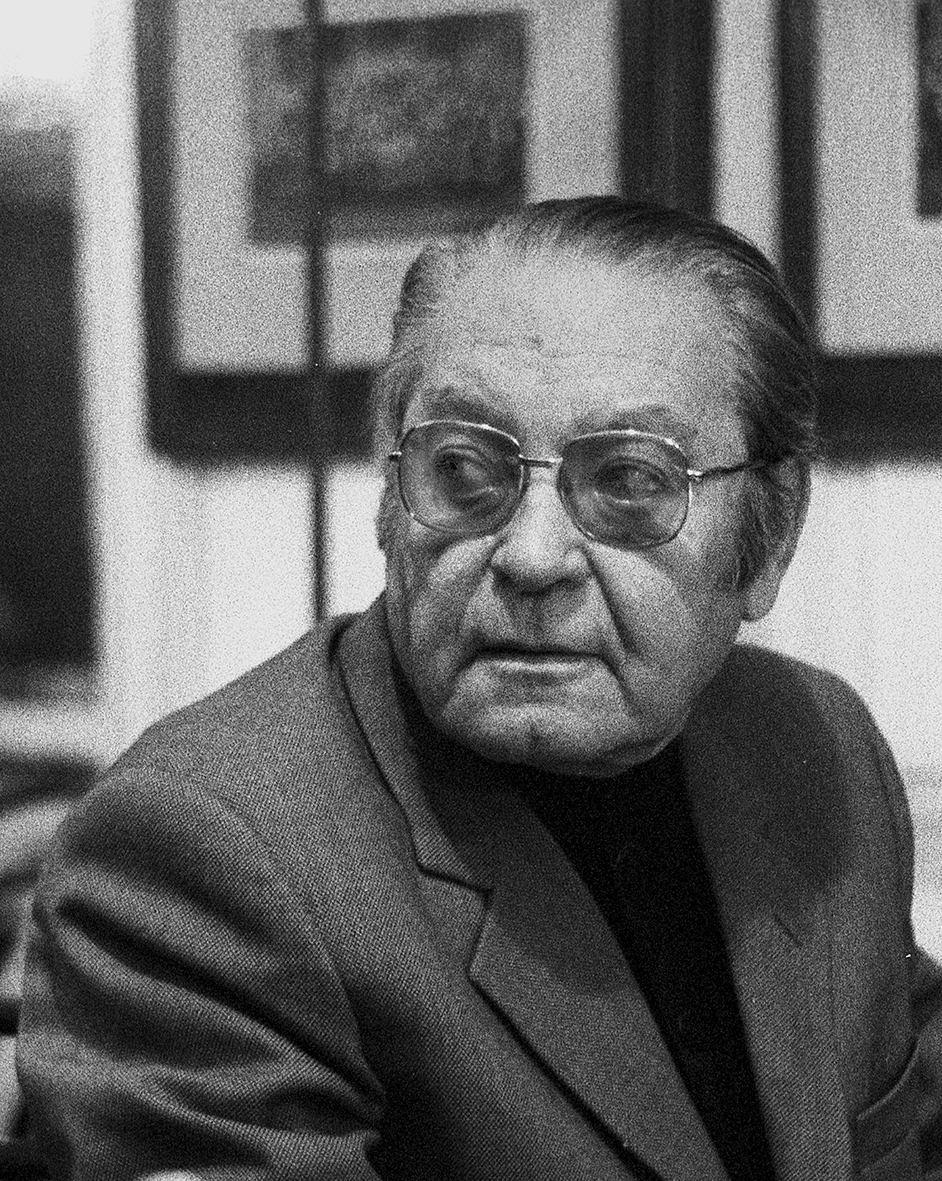
Jindřich Chalupecký (1980th)

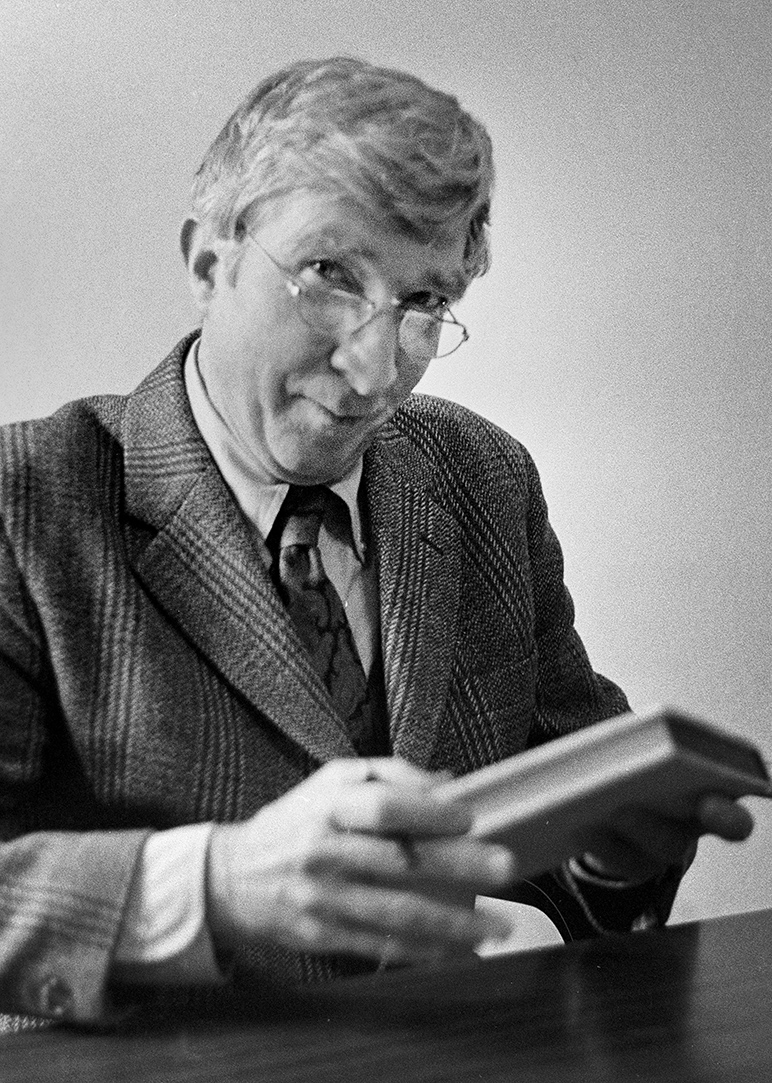
John Updike 1986

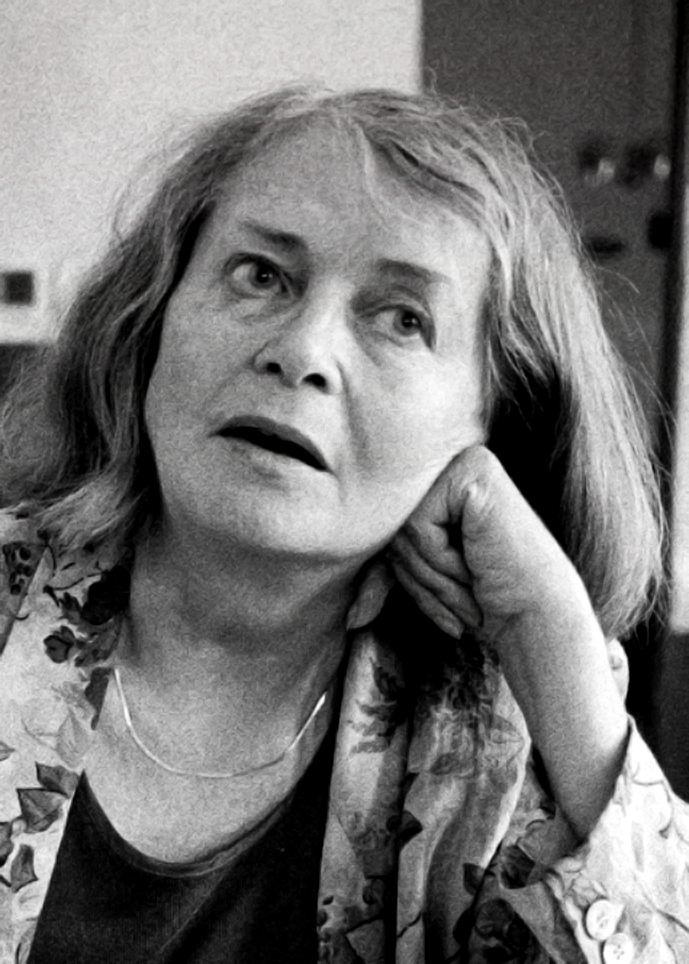
Naděžda Plíšková

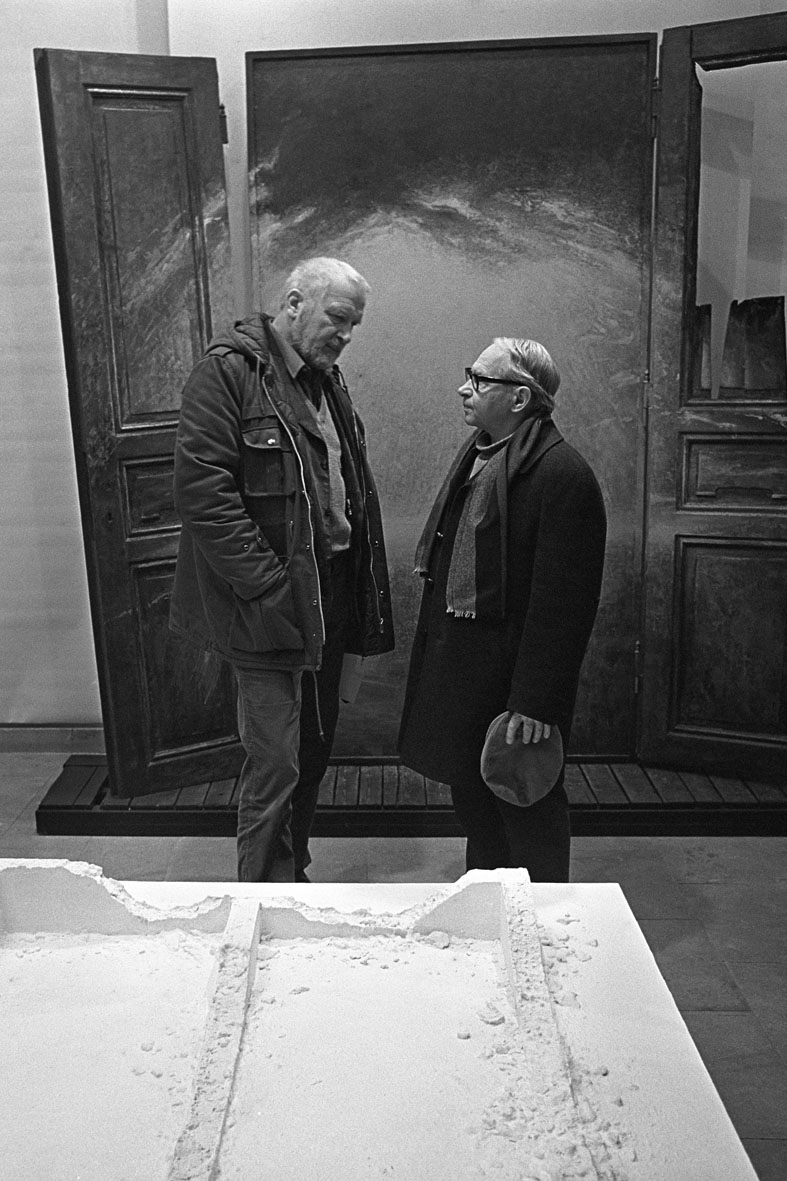
Olbram Zoubek and Václav Boštík

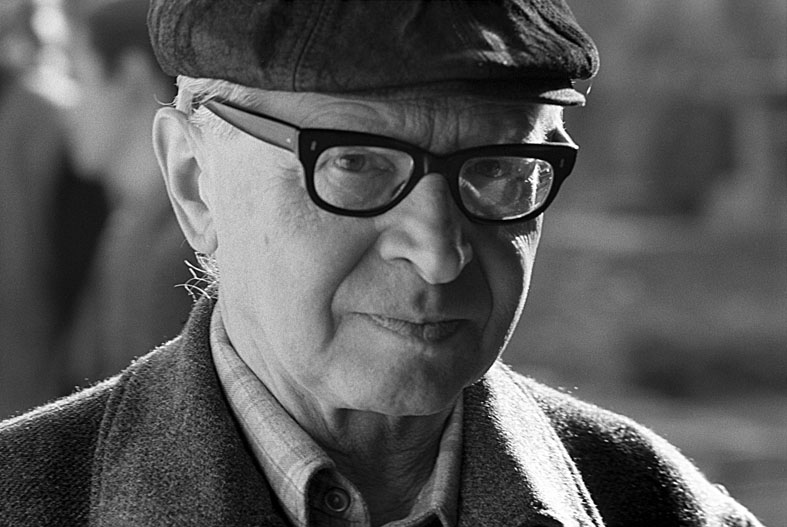
Václav Boštík (1980th)

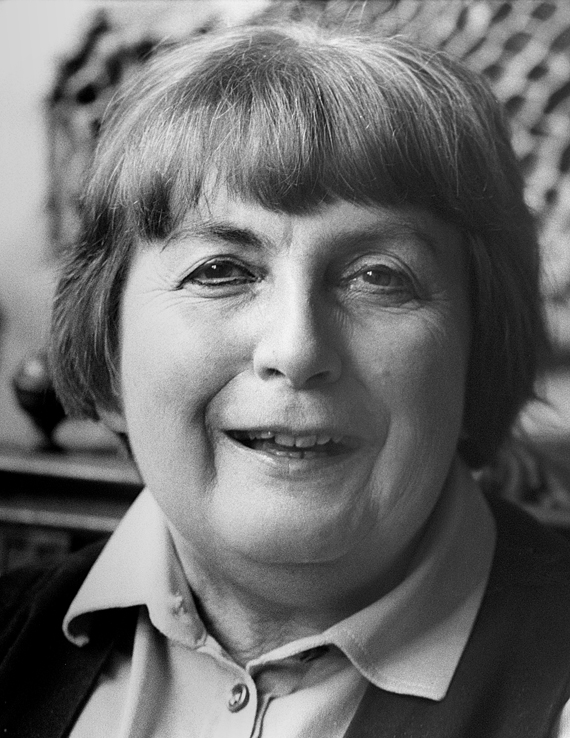
Věra Janoušková (2014)

=== Exhibitions (selection) ===
- 1984 Prague, zasedací síň ČSS Praha 7, curator Ján Šmok
- 1987 Sovinec (with Josef Hampl)
- 1988 Olomouc, Galerie Pod podloubím
- 1990 Cultural Centre Opatov, Prague; Olomouc, Divadlo hudby; Museum of Art – University of Michigan; Galerie A4, Wels
- 1997 Litera Gallery, Prague; Rychnov nad Kněžnou, Muzeum
- 1998 City Museum, Hranice; Esslingen (SRN), IV. Internationale Foto – Triennale
- 1999 University of Michigan Museum of Art
- 2000 Jiří Jílek Gallery, Šumperk
- 2002 Eastern Michigan University (with Josef Hampl)
- 2005 Galerie Claudine Hohl, Zürich (with Silvia Billeter)
- 2006 Magna Gallery, Ostrava
- 2015 University of Michigan Museum of Art
- 2017 Frye Art Museum, Seattle
- 2021 Institute of Geophysics of the Czech Academy of Sciences
- 2024 Klenová Castle Stewardship

== Catalogues ==
- Hana Hamplová, 1984
- Hana Hamplová: Fotografie / Photographs, Josef Hampl: Kresby – šití / Drawings – sewing, Hrad Sovinec 1987
- Hana Hamplová, Galerie Studio Opatov, Praha 1990
- Hana Hamplová: Tváře / Faces, Divadlo hudby / The Theater of Music (Titanic gallery), Olomouc 1990
- Hana Hamplová, Městské muzeum a galerie / City Museum and Gallery, Hranice 1998
- Hana Hamplová: Cesta k harmonii The Path to Harmony, Galerie Jiřího Jílka, Šumperk 2000
- Hana Hamplová: Photos, Ford Gallery at Eastern Michigan University, 2002
- Hana Hamplová, Galerie Magna, Ostrava 2006
- Hana Hamplová: Fotografie 1980 – 2020, Archiv výtvarného umění, z.s., Kostelec nad Černými lesy 2021
