= Dolní Újezd =

Dolní Újezd may refer to places in the Czech Republic:

- Dolní Újezd (Přerov District), a municipality and village in the Olomouc Region
- Dolní Újezd (Svitavy District), a municipality and village in the Pardubice Region
