= Václav Boštík =

Czech painter, graphic artist and illustrator (1913–2005)

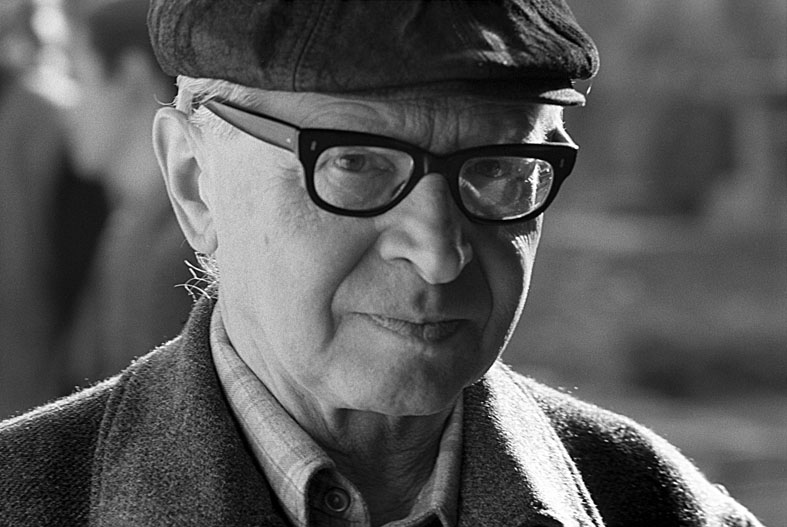
- Born: 6 November 1913; Horní Újezd, Czechia
- Died: 7 May 2005 (aged 91); Prague, Czechia
- Education: Czech Technical University in Prague, Academy of Fine Arts, Prague
- Known for: Painting, graphic art, illustration

Václav Boštík (6 November 1913 – 7 May 2005) was a Czech painter, graphic artist and illustrator.

== Career ==
In 1937, he joined the Academy in Prague and from 1942, he was a member of the Umělecká beseda (Art Forum). In 1959, he became one of the founding members of the UB 12 Group.

His early work is much influenced by painters Corot and Cézanne and realism. However, by the late 1950s, he had begun painting abstract art. His first solo exhibition was held in Prague in 1957. Due to the limited possibilities of exhibitions in Czechoslovakia, he also worked as a restorer and book illustrator. Among other things, he participated in the restoration of Renaissance artistic work on the facade of Litomyšl castle. Between 1955 and 1959, together with Jiří John, he created a unique memorial to Holocaust victims in Prague, which consisted of writing the names of 77 297 Czech Holocaust victims on the wall of the Pinkas Synagogue in Prague.

Since the 1970s, he has presented his work at solo exhibitions abroad (Rome, Besançon, Paris). In 1991, he was awarded the Chevalier de L'Ordre des Arts et des Lettres (Knight of the Order of Arts and Letter) by the French government. Shortly before his death, in 2004 he received an award from the Minister of Culture and in the same year Medal of Merit from the President of the Czech Republic.

== See also ==
- List of Czech painters
