= Dolní Újezd (Svitavy District) =

- Municipality
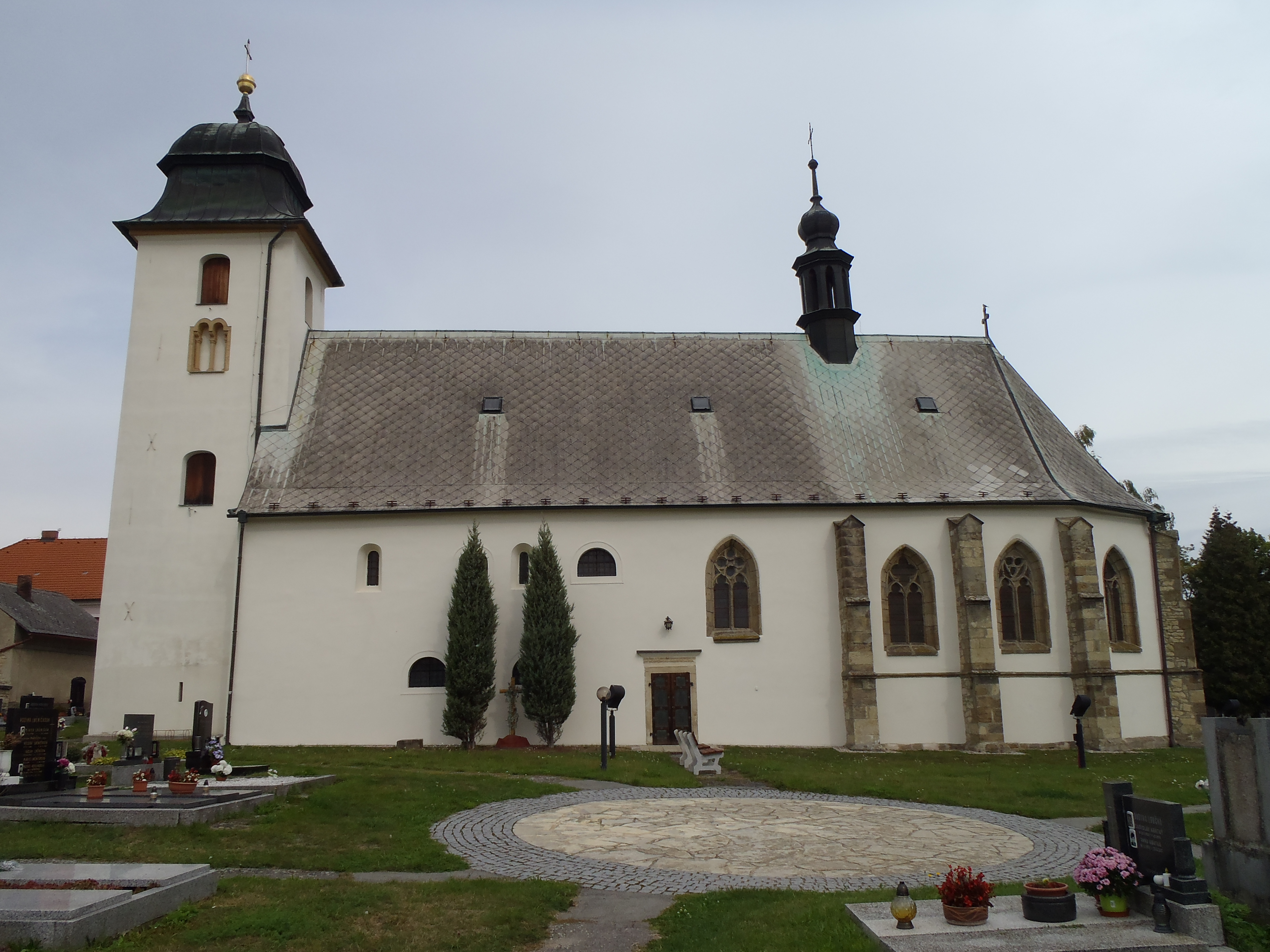
- Church of Saint Martin

- Flag Coat of arms

- Location in the Czech Republic
- Coordinates: 49°49′32″N 16°15′17″E
- Country: Czech Republic
- Region: Pardubice
- District: Svitavy
- First mentioned: 1167

Area
  - Total: 19.71 km^{2} (7.61 sq mi)
- Elevation: 405 m (1,329 ft)

Population (2026-01-01)
  - Total: 1,958
  - Density: 99.34/km^{2} (257.3/sq mi)
- Time zone: UTC+1 (CET)
  - Summer (DST): UTC+2 (CEST)
- Postal codes: 569 61, 570 01
- Website: www.dolniujezd.cz

Dolní Újezd is a municipality and village in Svitavy District in the Pardubice Region of the Czech Republic. It has about 2,000 inhabitants.

== Administrative division ==
Dolní Újezd consists of three municipal parts (in brackets population according to the 2021 census):

- Dolní Újezd (1,747)
- Jiříkov (93)
- Václavky (20)

== Etymology ==
Újezd is a common Czech toponym. The prefix dolní means 'lower' and serves to distinguish it from neighbouring Horní Újezd ('upper Újezd').

== Geography ==
Dolní Újezd is located about 17 kilometres (11 mi) northwest of Svitavy and 40 km (25 mi) southeast of Pardubice. It lies in the Svitavy Uplands. The highest point is at 474 m (1,555 ft) above sea level. The Desná Stream flows through the municipality.

== History ==
The first written mention of Dolní Újezd is in a deed of King Vladislaus II from 1167, where the village was called Újezd na Lubném. There were several other small settlements near Dolní Újezd, which gradually merged with Dolní Újezd. The village of Václavky was founded in 1730 by Václav Trautmansdorf. The village of Jiříkov was founded in 1785 by Jiří of Valdštejn.

== Demographics ==
Historical population

Year	Pop.	±%
1869	2,425	—
1880	2,415	−0.4%
1890	2,361	−2.2%
1900	2,352	−0.4%
1910	2,350	−0.1%

Year	Pop.	±%
1921	2,318	−1.4%
1930	2,161	−6.8%
1950	1,781	−17.6%
1961	1,765	−0.9%
1970	1,730	−2.0%

Year	Pop.	±%
1980	1,749	+1.1%
1991	1,817	+3.9%
2001	1,875	+3.2%
2011	1,952	+4.1%
2021	1,860	−4.7%

Source: Censuses

== Transport ==
There are no railways or major roads passing through the municipality.

== Sights ==
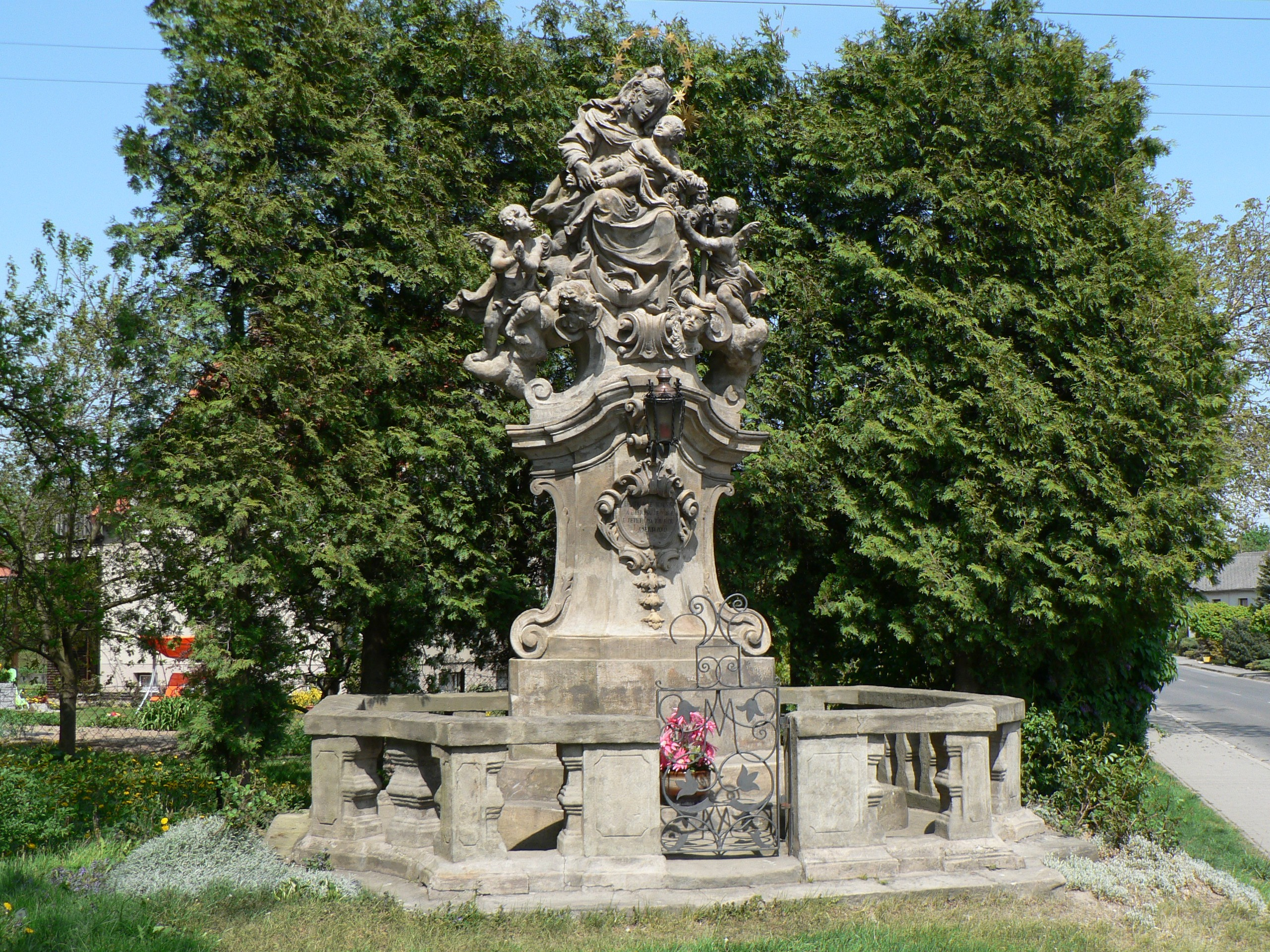
Sculptural group of the Virgin Mary

The main landmark of Dolní Újezd is the Church of Saint Martin. It has a Romanesque core from around 1270 and a Gothic presbytery from around 1340. Romanesque modification were incorporated in 1553. Next to the church is a separate bell tower, which also includes the gate to the church's cemetery.

In the centre of Dolní Újezd is a valuable Baroque sculptural group of the Virgin Mary. It dates from 1737.

== Paleontology ==
In 1960, a fragment of jawbone of a small-sized Cretaceous marine reptile (mosasaur) was found here.
