= Pinkas Synagogue =

Synagogue in Prague, Czech Republic

- Czech: Pinkasova synagoga
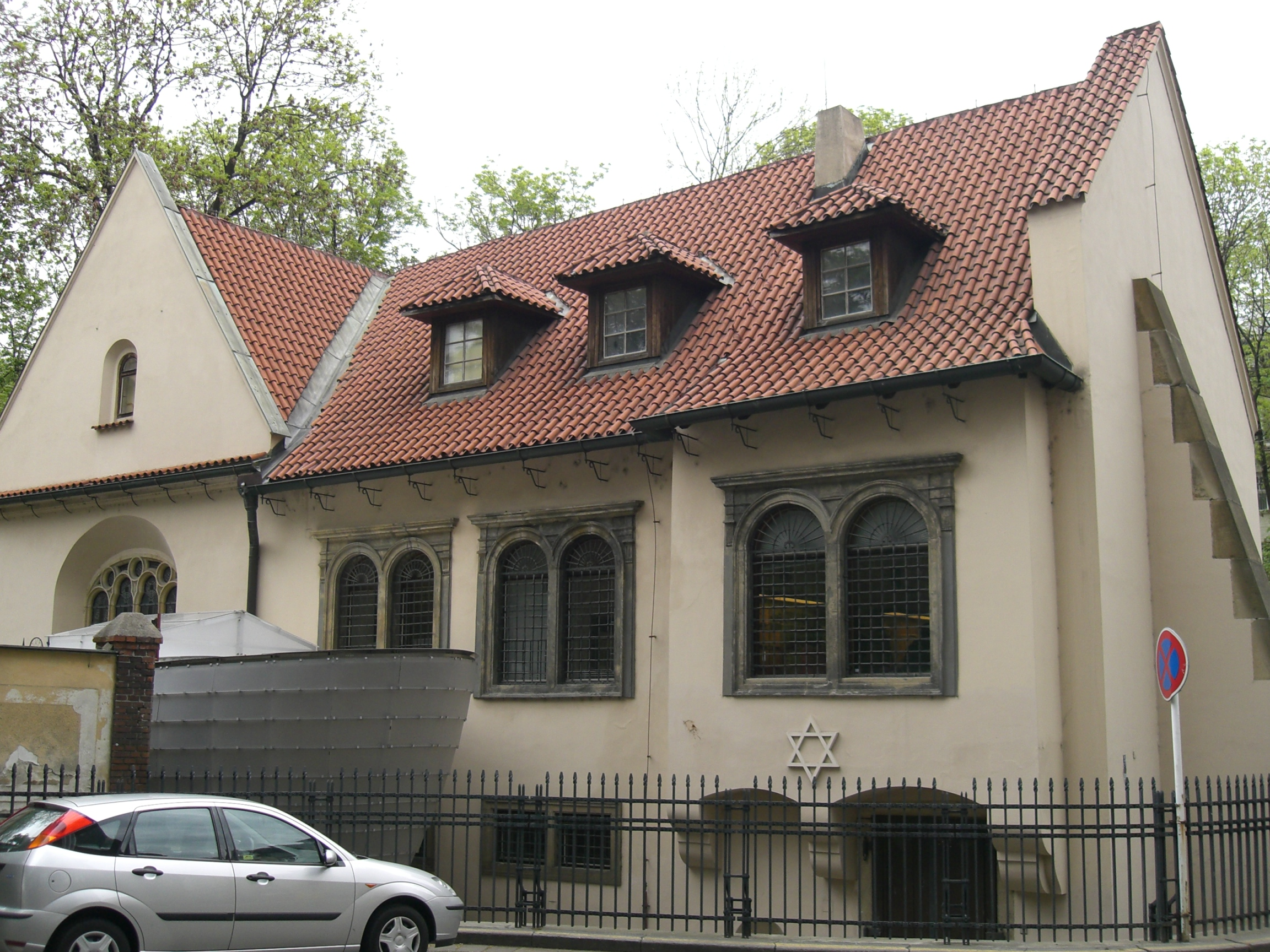
- The former synagogue, now museum, in 2007

- Location of the former synagogue, now museum, in the Czech Republic

Religion
- Affiliation: Judaism (former)
- Ecclesiastical or organizational status: Synagogue (1535–1941); Jewish museum (1960–1970; since 1989)
- Status: Closed (as a synagogue); Repurposed

Location
- Location: Široká 3, Josefov, Prague
- Country: Czech Republic
- Interactive map of Pinkas Synagogue
- Coordinates: 50°05′21″N 14°25′01″E

Architecture
- Type: Synagogue architecture
- Style: Gothic; Renaissance
- Founder: Aaron Meshullam Horowitz
- Established: 15th century (as a congregation)
- Completed: 1535

The Pinkas Synagogue (Czech: Pinkasova synagoga) is a former Jewish congregation and synagogue, located at Široká 3, in the Jewish Town of Prague, in the Czech Republic. Completed in 1535, the synagogue the second oldest surviving synagogue in Prague and was completed in the Gothic style. Its origins date from the 15th century and are connected with the Horowitz family, a renowned Jewish family in Prague. Today, the synagogue is administered by the Jewish Museum in Prague and commemorates approximately 80,000 Czech Jewish victims of The Holocaust.

== History ==
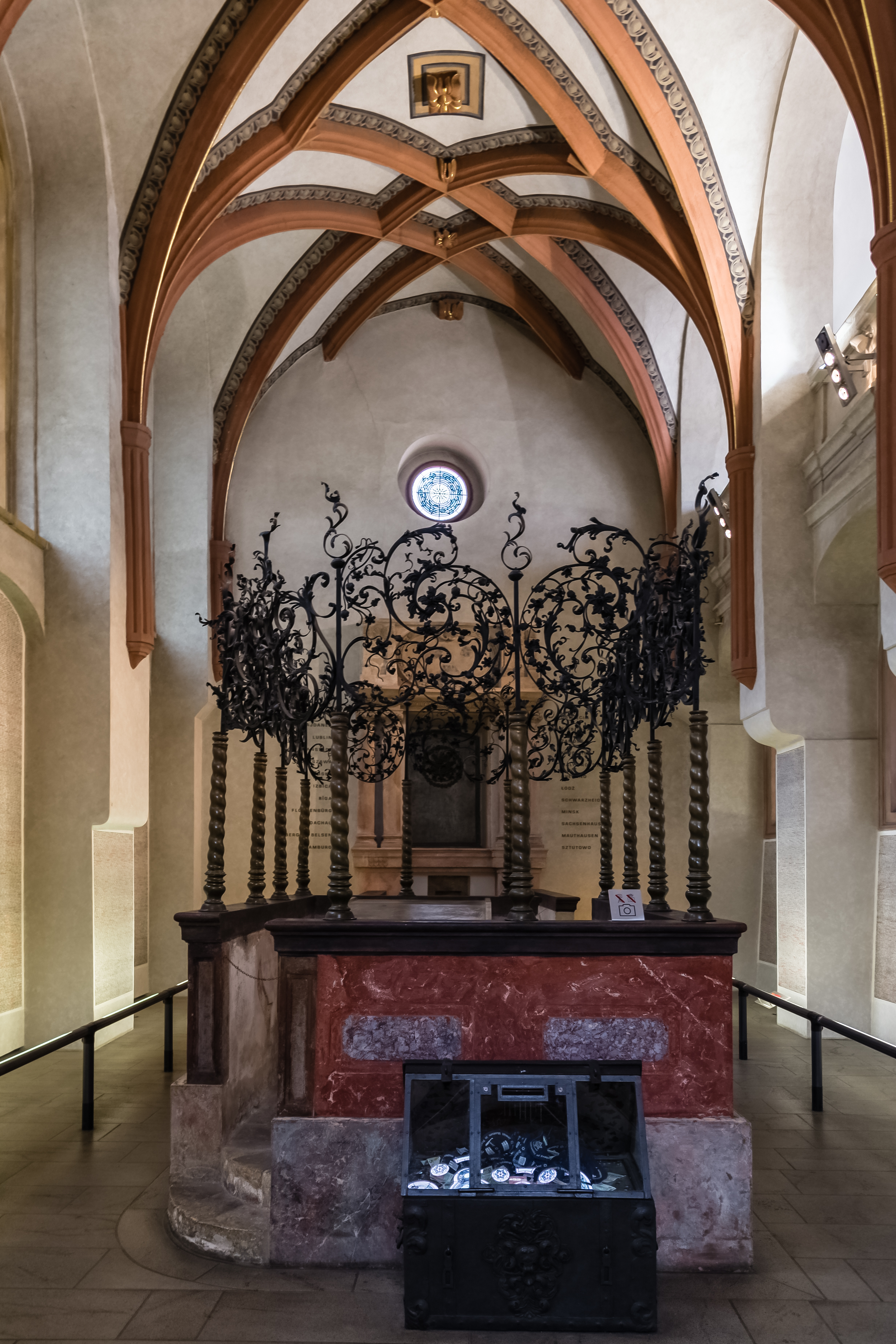
Interior: main body of the synagogue

=== 15th to 18th century ===
An archaeological excavation showed that in 15th century in the area of present Pinkas Synagogue there were wells, a mikveh and inhabited houses. By 1492 in one of those houses there was a private oratory belonging to a distinguished Prague Jewish family of Horowitz. In 1535 one of the family members, Aharon Meshulam Horowitz, decided to replace the house by a synagogue for his family. There are competing accounts about whether the synagogue was named after a previous owner, a brother, or a grandson.

The building mixes Gothic and Renaissance styles – for example, the reticulated vault is made in the late Gothic style but its ornaments have Renaissance features and the portal is pure Renaissance. Between 1607 and 1625 an annex in Renaissance style was added and so the synagogue was extended with a vestibule, a women's section and a balcony. The architectural plan of the annex was designed by Juda Coref de Herz (also the architect of the Maisel Synagogue).

The floor of the synagogue is below the ground level so it was repeatedly afflicted by floods and moisture. In the second half of 18th century it was necessary to restore aron-ha-kodesh and bimah damaged by flood and so they were changed to the Baroque style. About the same time (in 1793) successful businessman and communal leader Joachim von Popper donated the synagogue with a wrought-iron Rococo grille which adorns the bimah. The grille is decorated with the Magen David, with a Middle-Age Jewish hat.

=== 19th century to modern times ===
In 1860, a radical step was taken to solve the problem of floods – the floor level of the synagogue was raised by 1,5 m. The Baroque bimah disappeared, the arrangement of the seats was modernized (seats surrounding the walls as in Old-New Synagogue were replaced by the church-like rows) and pseudo-Romanesque style dominated the space. However, less than century later, during reconstruction in 1950–1954, the original floor-level as well as the appearance of the synagogue were restored.

During World War II, the Pinkas Synagogue served as a storehouse of Jewish liturgical utensils, which, after the ban on Jewish services in the autumn of 1941, could no longer be commonly used in Prague synagogues. When the Jewish Central Museum was established in the second half of 1942, the synagogue was also to serve as a repository of monuments, which it collected from Czech and Moravian communities, but also as a conservation office. Although the Jewish Central Museum considered at the beginning of 1943 moving the pre-war exposition of the Prague Jewish Museum to the Pinkas Synagogue, less than a year later it abandoned this idea due to various difficulties and the Pinkas Synagogue remained a warehouse.

In following five years, the walls of the synagogue were covered with names of 77,297 Bohemian and Moravian Jewish victims of the Shoah. The names are arranged by communities where the victims came from and complemented with their birth and death date. The memorial was designed by painters Václav Boštík and Jiří John. In 1960 it was opened to public, but it was closed after less than a decade, in 1968, after the Soviet occupation of Czechoslovakia. It was said that the reason for closing was moisture. After the fall of communist regime in 1989 the synagogue was reconstructed for three years and then opened to public, but it took another three years to restore the inscriptions of the names on the walls that were damaged by moisture. Moreover, in 2002, as a result of more flooding, the inscriptions were again restored.

== Permanent exhibition ==
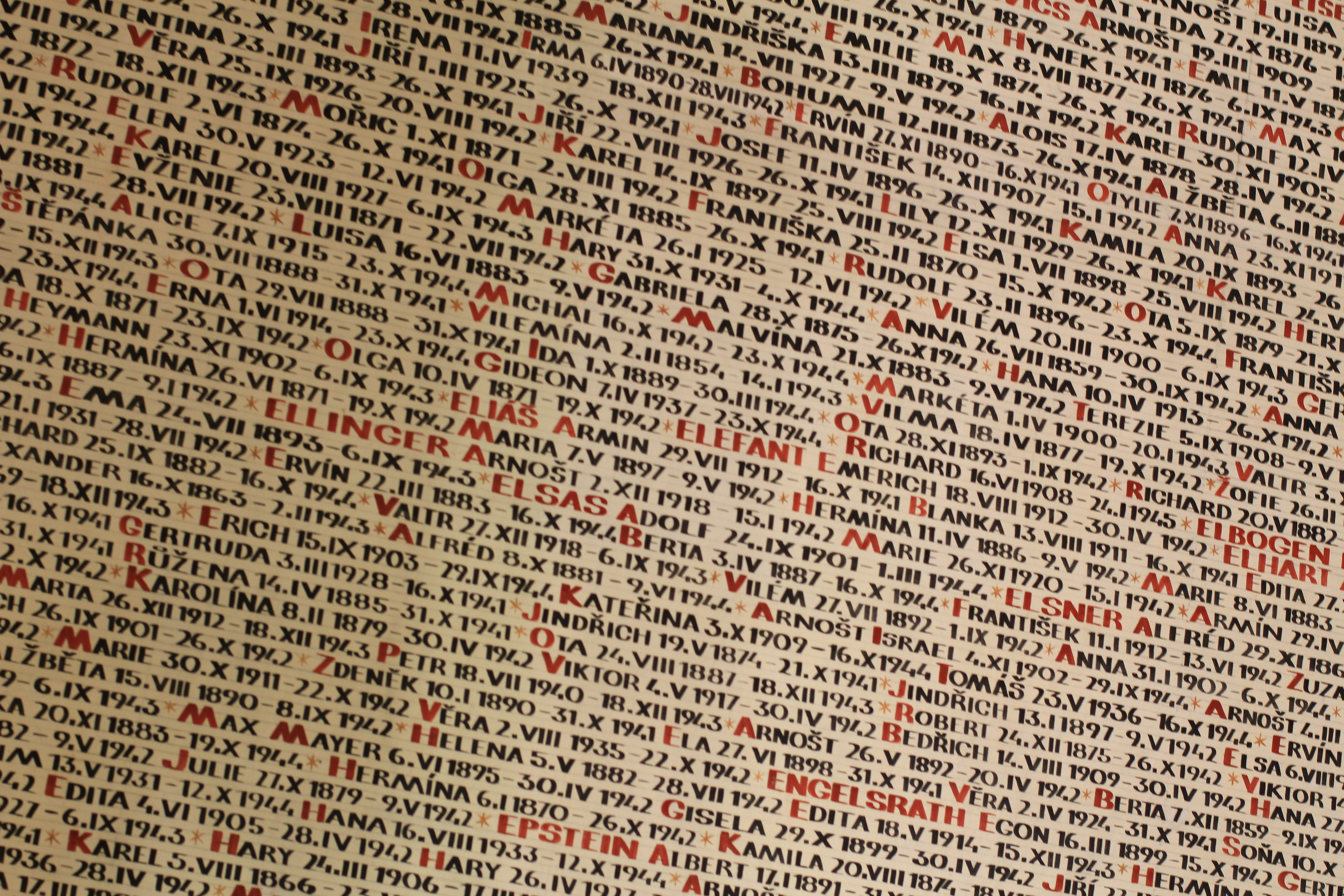
Names of the Holocaust victims from Czech lands on the synagogue's inner wall

On the first floor of the synagogue there is an exhibition of pictures drawn by children in the Theresienstadt Ghetto. Children drew them during lessons led by Friedl Dicker-Brandeis (1898–1944), a painter, who studied at Bauhaus, Weimar. Dicker-Brandeis's experience from Bauhaus influenced the conception of her drawing lessons in Theresienstadt. She encouraged children to express themselves in drawing, to grapple with their grim experiences from the ghetto, as well as to capture their memories from home and dreams about the future. Their pictures therefore offer wide-ranged testimony about the daily reality of the ghetto and about individual children. Most of the children, as well as Friedl Dicker-Brandeis, were murdered in Auschwitz. The only witnesses of their lives, their drawings, "survived" because Dicker-Brandeis hid them in Theresienstadt before her deportation to Auschwitz. After the war about 4,500 pictures were handed over to the Jewish Museum in Prague.

Beside activities of the museum, Pinkas Synagogue serves also the religious community.

=== The Faces of the Victims of the Shoah ===
Projection of photographs of Shoah victims in the form of video mapping onto the mikveh of the synagogue is freely visible every evening except Fridays and Jewish holidays from Široká Street. The start and end of the projection is variable with regard to the time of sunset throughout the year. It lasts 2.5 hours in the winter months, but is shortened to 45 minutes in the summer (due to later sunset times).

==== Digital extension of the Pinkas Synagogue ====
The digital extension of the exhibition is available through an information kiosk inside the synagogue and a web interface. The electronic database contains the names of individual victims, including their portraits, if the images are available to the museum. The database also makes it possible to search for the location of the names of individual victims on the walls of the synagogue.

== See also ==
- History of the Jews in the Czech Republic
