= Edith Kramer =

Austrian-American artist (1916–2014)

- Self-portrait, 2006
- Born: August 29, 1916; Vienna, Austria
- Died: February 22, 2014 (aged 97); Austria
- Known for: Painting; Art therapy
- Movement: Social realism
- Website: www.edithkramer.com

Edith Kramer (1916–2014) was an Austrian social realist painter, a follower of psychoanalytic theory and an art therapy pioneer.

== Life and work ==
Kramer was born in Vienna, Austria-Hungary, in 1916. At age 13 Kramer began art lessons with Friedl Dicker. Dicker was graduate of the Bauhaus in Weimar, Germany and was an artist and art teacher of note. Kramer studied drawing, sculpture and painting, and was influenced by the method for teaching art developed by Bauhaus artist Johannes Itten. It was in 1934 after Kramer graduated from Realgymnasium that she, then 18, followed Dicker to Prague to continue to study under her. During this time in Prague, Kramer witnessed the therapeutic impact of art when she assisted Dicker in teaching art to the children of political refugees.

With the threat of Nazi invasion looming, Kramer took refuge in America in 1938. In New York City, she worked for three years teaching sculpture at a progressive school called the Little Red School House. During World War II Kramer worked as a machinist at a tool and die shop in the Soho district of New York City. She stayed after her shift to draw the other workers in their industrial setting. These works were rendered in the social realist style. In 1947 Kramer visited some of the earliest known artwork, in the caves at Lascaux. Kramer spoke of these cave paintings as an example of the universal language of art.

At the age of 33 she returned to New York City, with hopes of making a living as an artist. Still in her 33rd year, Kramer was offered a job at Wiltwyck School for Boys, a school and residential treatment facility for children with behavioral and emotional needs. This job was arranged for her by psychoanalyst and board member at Wiltwyck, Dr. Viola Bernard. Dr. Bernard gave Kramer the title, "Art Therapist," noting that few teachers were willing to work with such challenging students. It was here that Kramer worked with disturbed boys, ages 8 through 13, for the following seven years.

Raised in a family which was interested in psychoanalytic theory, Kramer herself became a follower of Sigmund Freud. Kramer especially believed in the concept of sublimation. Freudian theory describes sublimation as a process in which primitive urges coming from the id are transformed into socially productive activities that lead to gratification of the original urge. Kramer's training was in art, art education and psychoanalytically informed psychotherapy. Kramer believed sublimation to be one of the most vital goals of art therapy. Through art, she believed, negative and destructive emotions and urges are transformed into useful products. Kramer asserted that the success of the therapy could be measured by the visual product.

Though Kramer and her fellow pioneer of American art therapy, Margaret Naumburg, had a similar goal of combining art and psychology, their beliefs took a different path where Kramer began to declare that it was art as therapy, and Naumburg instead promoted art in therapy.

Kramer's life work was spent with children and adolescents that were often unable to explain their feelings through the use of words. In 1958 Kramer published Art Therapy in a Children's Community, based on her time working with the students at the Wiltwyck School. Kramer also worked at Jacobi Hospital in their child psychiatric ward for 13 years. In 1971 Kramer published Art as Therapy with Children. Kramer wrote in her books of her experiences with her clients. Kramer worked for 14 years at the Jewish Guild for the Blind. In 1976 Kramer, with the help of Dr. Laurie Wilson, founded the graduate program in Art Therapy at New York University. While at NYU, Kramer came up with an important method of the program and called it, “the Art Therapist third hand intervention.” This concept called for the versatility of the art therapist. "The third hand can be summed up as the art therapist's ability to facilitate a person's artistic process (such as strategically helping the individual mix paints for a desired color or intervening at critical moments during art making)". Kramer believed that product was as important as process in Art Therapy. She felt denying the client the gratification of the end product was robbing them. Kramer believed that Art Therapy should fall more in the humanities area than psychology. She asserted that art therapy was not a replacement, but a supplement to psychotherapy.

When in active practice, Kramer maintained a studio where she painted, etched, and sculpted. Kramer believed that art should be personal and reflective of the artist's environment. She often depicted physical, tangible objects such as herself, other people, landscapes, and cityscapes. She preferred painting with expressive colors. Kramer argued that art therapists must make their own art in order to cope with "exhausting clinical work."

Edith Kramer became a U.S. citizen in 1944. Kramer received an honorary doctorate in 1996 from Norwich University in Northfield, Vermont. She helped develop one of the country's earliest art therapy graduate degree programs at New York University. She continued to work in NYU's Graduate Art Therapy Program from 1973 to 2005 as an adjunct professor and was an assistant professor in the Graduate Art Therapy Program at George Washington University in Washington, D.C. The American Art Therapy Association gave her the award of "Honorary Life Member,” a mark of highest esteem.

Kramer eventually returned to her home in Austria. She died in 2014.

In 2014, Kramer was posthumously awarded the inaugural Myra Levick Award for Excellence in Art Therapy. The award was given "[f]or her role as an artist and art therapist whose ability to communicate with troubled children through art is a treasured legacy of a pioneer in our field. Her idea of art as therapy with her emphasis on the creative process itself as healing is a major contribution to art therapy theory".

== Family ==
Edith Kramer was a niece of Theodor Kramer (1897–1958) and Elisabeth Neumann-Viertel (1900–1994).
