= Friedl Dicker-Brandeis =

Austrian artist and educator who died teaching children in Auschwitz

Frederika "Friedl" Dicker-Brandeis
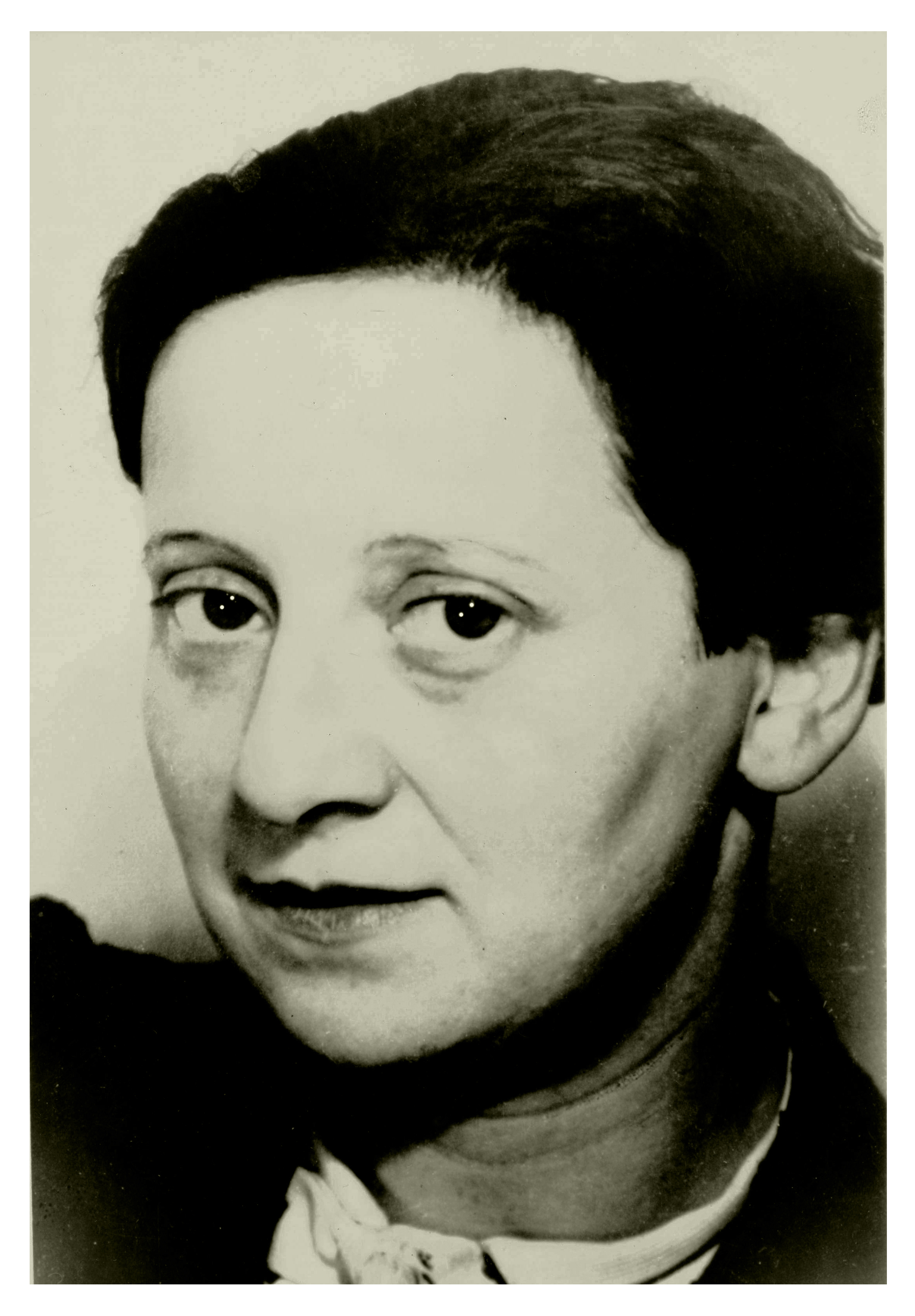
- Born: Frederika Dicker; July 30, 1898; Vienna, Austria-Hungary
- Died: October 9, 1944 (aged 46); Auschwitz-Birkenau, German-occupied Poland
- Known for: Painting, Drawing, Design
- Spouse: Pavel Brandeis (m. 1936)

Frederika "Friedl" Dicker-Brandeis (30 July 1898, Vienna – 9 October 1944, Auschwitz-Birkenau), was an Austrian artist, designer and educator murdered by the Nazis in the Auschwitz-Birkenau extermination camp. From 1919-1923 she was a student at the Weimar Bauhaus.

== Biography ==
=== Early Life and Bauhaus ===
Frederika Dicker was born in Vienna on 30 July 1898, into a poor Jewish family. Her father was a shop-assistant; her mother, Karolina, died in 1902. She married Pavel Brandeis in 1936 and used the hyphenated surname after that.

During Dicker-Brandeis’s teenage years she trained as a photographer at the Graphische Lehr- und Versuchsanstalt [Graphical Teaching and Research Institute] (1912–15). She studied textiles at the Kunstgewerbeschule (now the University of Applied Arts Vienna) (1915–16) and joined Arnold Schoenberg’s composition seminar (1918–19).

Dicker-Brandeis was a student of Johannes Itten at his private school in Vienna from 1916 to 1919. Here she met Franz Singer and Anny Wottitz, who became her longtime friends, and the three then followed Itten to the Weimar Bauhaus in 1919. After completing the obligatory one semester Bauhaus Preliminary Course, Dicker was accepted as a student. She was recognised as an exceptionally gifted student, such that throughout her time at the Weimar Bauhaus she was not required to pay some tuition fees, given scholarship funds and granted a studio in the autumn of 1921. She was involved in the textile design, printmaking, bookbinding, and typography workshops there from 1919–1923.

In 1920, the Masters’ Council (Meisterrat) issued a warning to a group of students including Dicker-Brandeis due to their involvement in creating political posters which commemorated the burial of fallen workers in the "Gegenrevolution", or counterrevolution in December 1919. Art historian Julie M. Johnson writes that Walter Gropius, the Bauhaus director, at times called the Itten group the “spiritual Jewish” faction. In a private letter to Lily Hildebrandt in December 1920 he wrote that the group would have to leave for peace to reign at the Bauhaus.

=== Design career in Berlin and Vienna ===
Armchair by Friedl Dicker and Franz Singer (Atelier Singer-Dicker), c. 1927

In 1923, Dicker-Brandeis and Singer moved to Berlin and founded the Werkstätten bildender Kunst [Workshops for Visual Art]. They did theatre work, creating stage sets and costumes first for Berthold Viertel’s ensemble Die Truppe, then for Bertolt Brecht.

Dicker-Brandeis moved back to Vienna in 1925, and opened a second studio at Wasserburggasse 2 with Martha Döberl. Singer had his own atelier in Vienna but soon joined her there, and in 1926 together they founded the Atelier Singer-Dicker, which lasted until the early 1930s. The studio received awards across several exhibitions for their "architectonic works, innovative furniture and other objects of interior design".

The studio often designed foldable, space-saving furniture with their stated mission to "solve social problems of space", for the working and middle classes. Around 1928 to 1929 their work moved away from heavy and expressive designs to a "more technical" approach with tubular steel.

Johnson writes that because of Dicker-Brandeis's "political engagement as a Communist", the firm received many commissions from Red Vienna. For example in 1930, their atelier was commissioned to furnish a Montessori kindergarten for Red Vienna. Their design included "folding beds, tables and chairs", which let the children change the room's layout to suit different purposes, turning a canteen into a dormitory and then a playroom. According to Johnson, the pair’s furniture was a precursor to that of Charles and Ray Eames.

Johnson writes that Singer was “often the named or credited designer of the architecture”, but that he and Dicker-Brandeis "had the same education and evidence shows that they worked interchangeably”.

=== Political activity and arrest ===
In 1931, Dicker-Brandeis probably joined the Communist Party of Austria (KPÖ). On 4 November 1931 she was accused of forging passports for the KPÖ and arrested. On 23 March 1932 she was sentenced to three months in prison. On 27 September 1932, Spiz writes that her release was obtained by Singer’s testimony that the charges against her were “preposterous”.

=== Prague and Hronov ===
After Dicker-Brandeis was released, she left Vienna in 1933 and moved to Prague. Here Dicker-Brandeis taught art to refugee children from 1933 to 1938. One of her students was Edith Kramer.

In her 1934 painting Interrogation I, Dicker-Brandeis captures her memory of the repeated interrogation process she went through while she was imprisoned in Vienna. In 1938, she and her husband Pavel moved to Hronov, where she worked as a weaving and textile designer at B. Spiegler and Sons.

Dicker-Brandeis wrote to a friend in 1940:

I remember thinking in school how I would grow up and would protect my students from unpleasant impressions, from uncertainty, from scrappy learning... Today only one thing seems important — to rouse the desire towards creative work, to make it a habit, and to teach how to overcome difficulties that are insignificant in comparison with the goal to which you are striving.

== In World War II ==
Dicker-Brandeis and her husband, Pavel Brandeis, were deported to the Terezín "model ghetto" on December 17, 1942. During her time at Terezín, she gave art lessons and lectures with art supplies she smuggled into the camp. She helped to organize art, craft and music classes as they were permitted within the camp. Her classes focused on the girls home L410 and the boys home L417. She saw drawing and art as a way for the children to understand their emotions and their environment. Dicker-Brandeis insisted that each child must sign their own name, not allowing them to become invisible or anonymous. In this, she persisted in pursuing her goal "to rouse the desire towards creative work."

In September 1944, Brandeis was transported to Auschwitz. Dicker-Brandeis volunteered for the next transport to join him. Before she was taken away, she entrusted Raja Engländerova, chief tutor of Girls' Home L 410, with two suitcases containing 4,500 drawings. Dicker-Brandeis was murdered in Birkenau on 9 October 1944. Her husband survived.

== Legacy ==
After the war, Willy Groag, director of the Girls' home L 410, brought the suitcases with children's drawings to the Jewish Community in Prague. From the nearly 660 authors of the drawings, 550 were murdered in the Holocaust. The drawings are now in the Jewish Museum in Prague's collection, with some on display in the Pinkas Synagogue.

1993 a book titled "I have not seen a butterfly around here: Childrens drawing and Poems from Terezin" was published by the Jewish Museum Prague. This book used the photos she facilitated and preserved as a primary source.

In 1999, an exhibition of Dicker-Brandeis' work, organized by the Simon Wiesenthal Center and curated by Elena Makarova of Israel, opened in Vienna. It then toured to the Czech Republic, Germany, Sweden, France, USA, and Japan.

Her work was included in the 2019 exhibition City Of Women: Female Artists in Vienna from 1900 to 1938 at the Österreichische Galerie Belvedere.

== Gallery ==
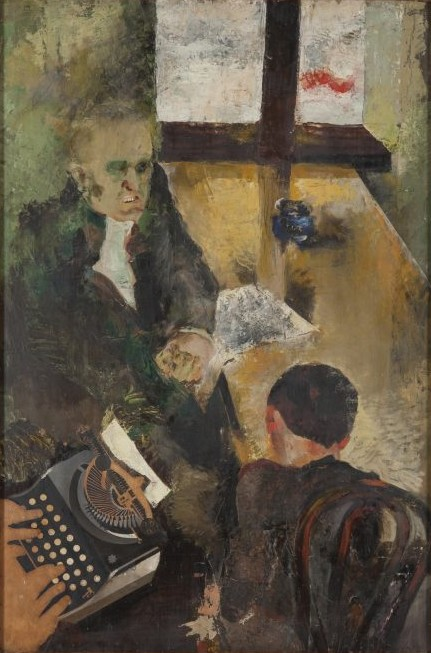
Výslech I

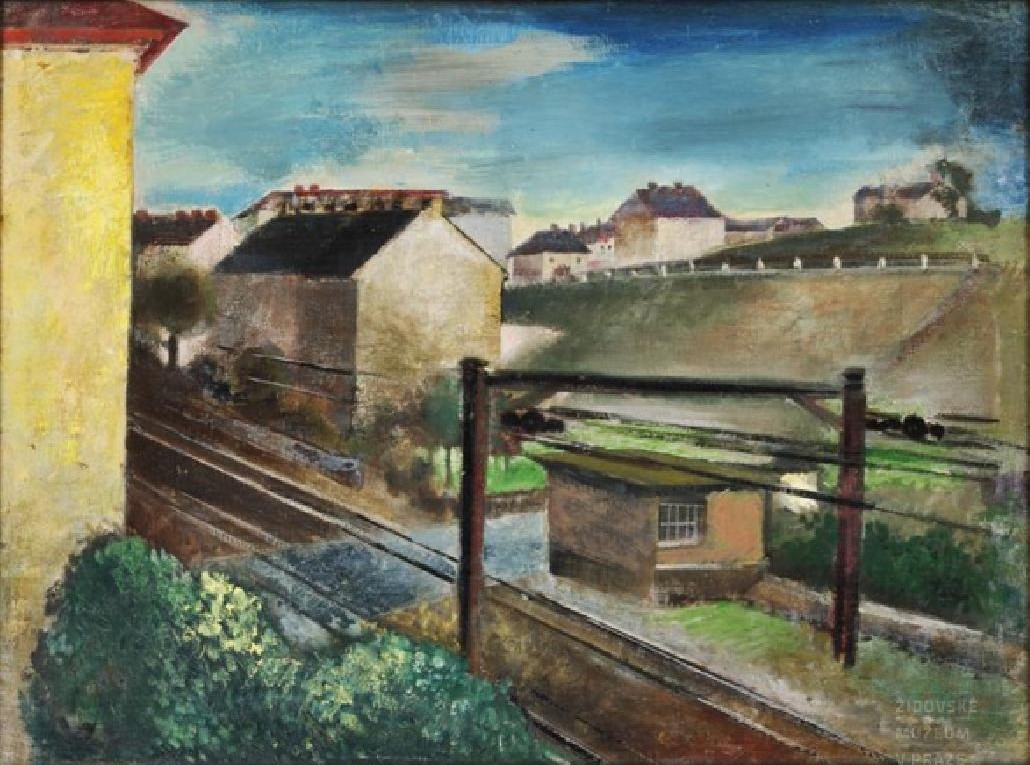
Nádraží

== See also ==
- Anni Albers
- Gunta Stölzl
- Margaretha Reichardt
- Otti Berger
- Women of the Bauhaus

== Bibliography ==
- Susan Goldman Rubin: Fireflies in the Dark: The Story of Friedl Dicker-Brandeis and the Children of Terezin, Holiday House Inc New York, 2000, ISBN 0-8234-1681-X
- Elena Makarova: Friedl Dicker-Brandeis, Vienna 1898–Auschwitz 1944: the artist who inspired the children's drawings of Terezin, 1st edition. Tallfellow/Every Picture Press, in association with Simon Wiesenthal Center/Museum of Tolerance, Los Angeles, 2001, ISBN 0-9676061-9-5
