= Horní Újezd (Přerov District) =

- Municipality
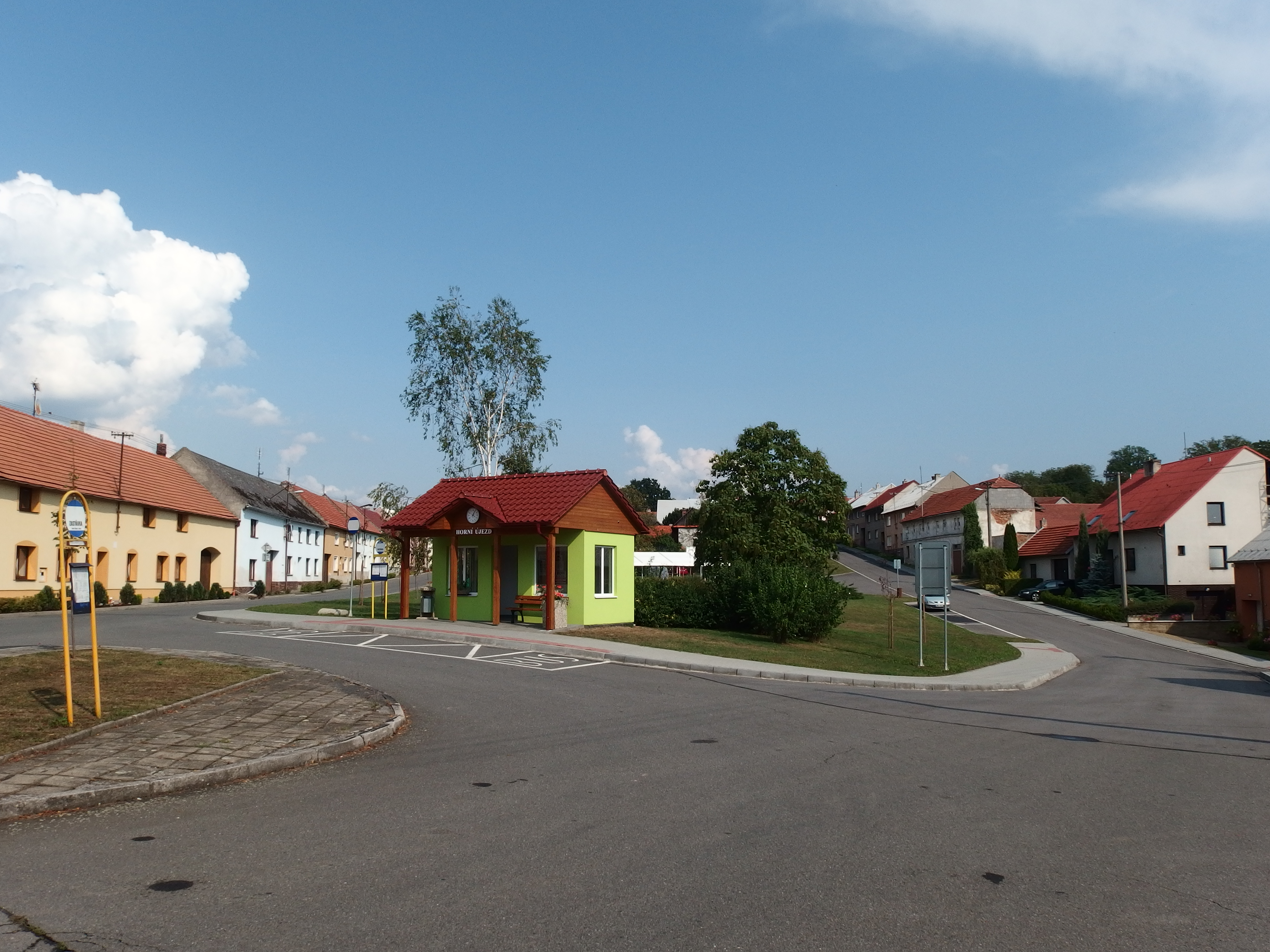
- Centre of Horní Újezd

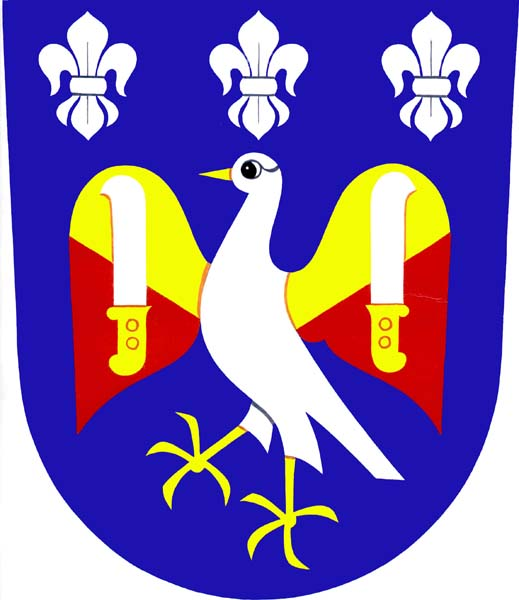
- Flag Coat of arms

- Location in the Czech Republic
- Coordinates: 49°26′54″N 17°43′38″E
- Country: Czech Republic
- Region: Olomouc
- District: Přerov
- First mentioned: 1486

Area
  - Total: 6.87 km^{2} (2.65 sq mi)
- Elevation: 335 m (1,099 ft)

Population (2026-01-01)
  - Total: 445
  - Density: 64.8/km^{2} (168/sq mi)
- Time zone: UTC+1 (CET)
  - Summer (DST): UTC+2 (CEST)
- Postal code: 753 53
- Website: www.horni-ujezd.cz

Horní Újezd is a municipality and village in Přerov District in the Olomouc Region of the Czech Republic. It has about 400 inhabitants.

Horní Újezd lies approximately 21 kilometres (13 mi) east of Přerov, 39 km (24 mi) south-east of Olomouc, and 249 km (155 mi) east of Prague.

== Demographics ==
Historical population
Year	Pop.	±%
1869	534	—
1880	568	+6.4%
1890	572	+0.7%
1900	538	−5.9%
1910	600	+11.5%
1921	565	−5.8%
1930	577	+2.1%
1950	562	−2.6%
1961	587	+4.4%
1970	590	+0.5%
1980	557	−5.6%
1991	469	−15.8%
2001	441	−6.0%
2011	433	−1.8%
2021	403	−6.9%
Source: Censuses
