= Horní Újezd (Svitavy District) =

- Municipality
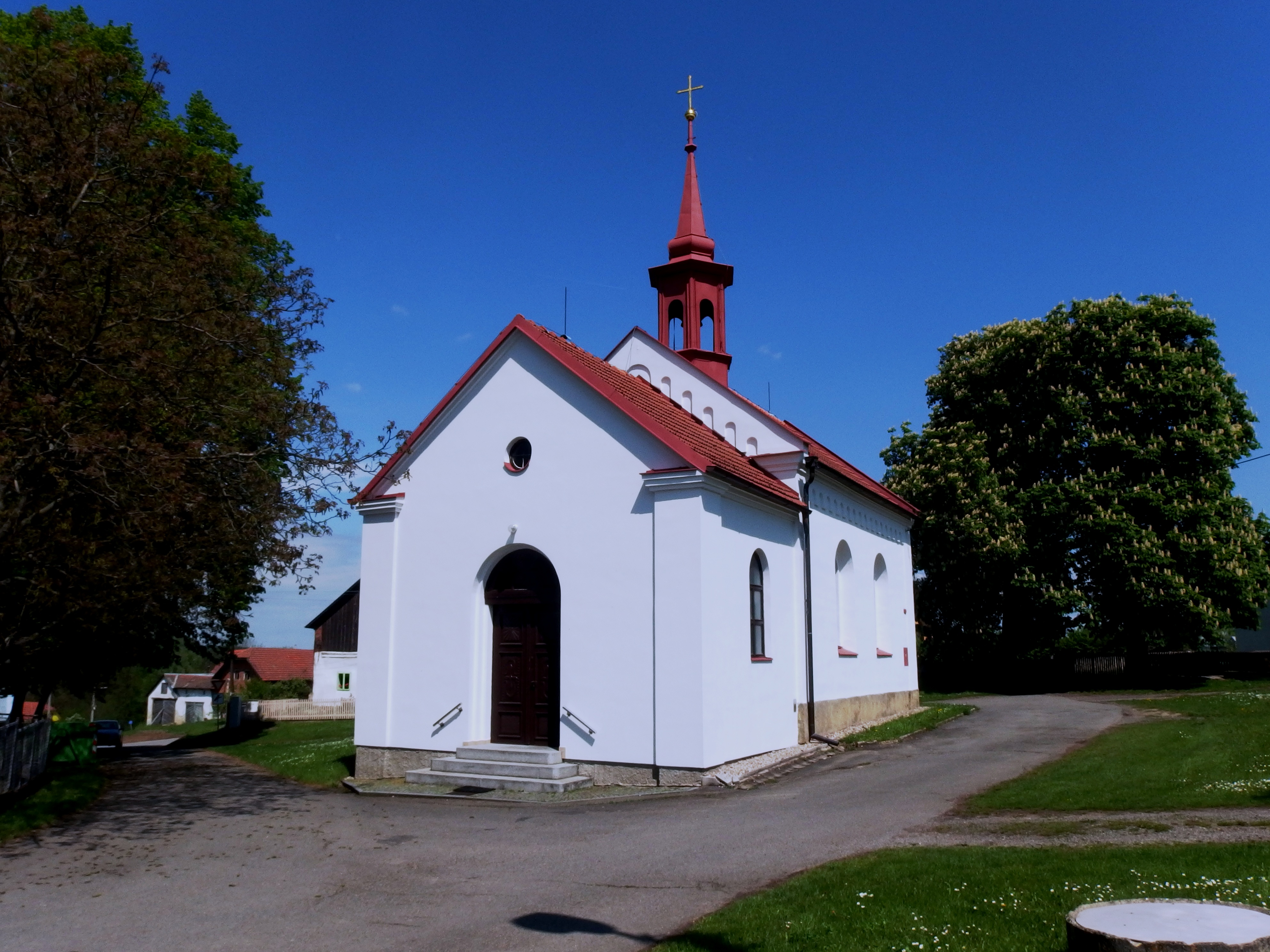
- Chapel of the Exaltation of the Holy Cross

- Flag Coat of arms

- Location in the Czech Republic
- Coordinates: 49°48′13″N 16°13′59″E
- Country: Czech Republic
- Region: Pardubice
- District: Svitavy
- First mentioned: 1544

Area
  - Total: 7.74 km^{2} (2.99 sq mi)
- Elevation: 425 m (1,394 ft)

Population (2026-01-01)
  - Total: 431
  - Density: 55.7/km^{2} (144/sq mi)
- Time zone: UTC+1 (CET)
  - Summer (DST): UTC+2 (CEST)
- Postal code: 570 01
- Website: www.horniujezd.cz

Horní Újezd is a municipality and village in Svitavy District in the Pardubice Region of the Czech Republic. It has about 400 inhabitants.

Horní Újezd lies approximately 18 kilometres (11 mi) west of Svitavy, 43 km (27 mi) south-east of Pardubice, and 134 km (83 mi) east of Prague.

== Demographics ==
Historical population
Year	Pop.	±%
1869	991	—
1880	944	−4.7%
1890	898	−4.9%
1900	893	−0.6%
1910	858	−3.9%
1921	823	−4.1%
1930	806	−2.1%
1950	606	−24.8%
1961	554	−8.6%
1970	495	−10.6%
1980	478	−3.4%
1991	440	−7.9%
2001	437	−0.7%
2011	431	−1.4%
2021	393	−8.8%
Source: Censuses
