= Hempel =

Hempel is a name of German, Dutch and Swedish origin and the surname of a Swedish noble family.

The following people have the surname:

- Adolph Hempel (1870–1949), Brazilian entomologist
- Amy Hempel (born 1951), American writer and professor
- Anouska Hempel (born 1941), New Zealand-born hotelier and designer and former actress
- Bill Hempel (1920–2001), American football player
- Carl Gustav Hempel (1905–1997), German-American philosopher
- Charles Frederick Hempel (1811–1867), German organist and composer, son of Charles William Hempel
- Charles Julius Hempel (1811–1879), German-born translator and homeopathic physician
- Charles William Hempel (1777–1855), English organist
- Eduard Hempel (1887–1972), Nazi German Minister to Ireland (1937–1945)
- Fábio Hempel (born 1980), Brazilian athlete
- Florian Hempel (born 1990), German darts player
- Frieda Hempel (1885–1955), German-American soprano
- Gotthilf Hempel (born 1929), German marine biologist and oceanographer
- Hazel Hempel Abel (1888–1966), United States Republican Party Senator for Nebraska (1954)
- Jan Hempel (born 1971), German Olympic diver
- Johan Wilhelm Hempel (1860–1920), Danish sea captain
- John Hempel (1935–2022), American mathematician
- Jutta Hempel (born 1960), German chess prodigy
- Lothar Hempel (born 1966), German artist
- Marc Hempel (born 1957), contemporary American cartoonist
- Marcella Hempel (1915-2010) Australian textile artist and master weaver
- Peter Hempel (born 1959), East German Olympic canoer
- Udo Hempel (born 1946), German Olympic road and track cyclist

== See also ==
- Hampel
- Hampl
- Hample
- Hempel Group, Danish coatings supplier company
- Hempel's paradox (or Hempel's ravens), synonyms for the Raven paradox named after Carl Gustav Hempel
- Hempel's dilemma, named after Carl Gustav Hempel
- Hempel Hotel, hotel in London
- 9820 Hempel, asteroid
- Hemple, Missouri
