= Karoline Pershell =

American mathematician

- Education: University of Tennessee at Martin, Rice University
- Scientific career
- Fields: Mathematics, Robotics
- Thesis: Some conditions for recognizing a 3-manifold group
- Doctoral advisor: John Hempel

Karoline Pershell is an American mathematician who works as the Chief Operating Officer for Service Robotics and Technologies (SRT Labs). She is a past Executive Director of the Association for Women in Mathematics.

== Education and career ==
Pershell received her bachelor’s degree in mathematics from the University of Tennessee Martin where she also competed as a bull rider on the UTM Rodeo Team from 2000 to 2002. She received her Ph. D in mathematics from Rice University in 2010. Her dissertation, Some conditions for recognizing a 3-manifold group, was advised by John Hempel.

Pershell has fulfilled a variety of roles after earning her Ph.D. She was an assistant professor in the Department of Mathematics and Statistics at the University of Tennessee at Martin from 2009 to 2013. As a Fulbright-Nehru Scholar, she taught mathematics at the University of Hyderabad in 2013. Pershell served at the Department of State’s Foreign Service Institute as Evaluation Coordinator from 2013 to 2015 under Amb. Nancy McEldowney and Amb. Marc L. Ostfield, earning two Benjamin Franklin Awards for Service to the Department. From 2018 to 2020, she served as the Executive Director for the Association for Women in Mathematics. She currently works as the COO for Service Robotics and Technologies. Pershell shares a robotics related software patent with SRT Labs Co-Founder, Dr. Gregory Scott.

== Awards and honors ==
Pershell has received several awards and honors for her achievements.

- In 2012-2013, Pershell was part of the U.S. Fulbright-Nehru Scholar Program.
- From 2013-2015, Pershell was an American Association for the Advancement of Science Science and Technology Policy Fellowship recipient.
- In 2016, Pershell received the Outstanding Young Alumni Award from the University of Tennessee Martin.
- In 2020, Pershell was a finalist for the Women Tech Council Awards.
- In 2023, Perschell received the 2024 AWM Service Awards for all the ways she served ce AWM in her role as Executive Director, for the meaningful AWM programs she initiated and improved, for creating a warm, welcoming, and inclusive environment, and for continuing to generously share her time, her energy, her enthusiasm, and her wisdom as a volunteer.
