= Hampl =

Hampl (feminine: Hamplová) is a Czech surname derived from the German surname Hampel. Notable people with the surname include:

- Hana Hamplová (born 1951), Czech cinematographer and photographer
- Josef Hampl (1932–2019), Czech artist
- Mojmír Hampl (born 1975), Czech economist
- Patricia Hampl (born 1946), American writer
- Václav Hampl (born 1962), Czech physiologist
- Zbyněk Hampl (born 1988), Czech ice hockey player
