= Hampel =

Hampel is a German surname. Notable people with the surname include:

- Anton Joseph Hampel (1710–1771), German classical horn player
- Armin-Paul Hampel (born 1957), German politician
- Desiderius Hampel (1895–1981), Croatian SS general
- Felicity Hampel (born 1955), Australian lawyer and judge
- George Hampel (disambiguation), multiple people
- Gunter Hampel (1937–2026), German jazz multi-instrumentalist and composer
- Jarosław Hampel (born 1982), Polish motorcycle speedway rider
- József Hampel (1849–1913), Hungarian archaeologist
- Olaf Hampel (born 1965), German bobsledder
- Oliver Hampel (born 1985), German footballer
- Otto and Elise Hampel (died 1943), German activists
- Paul William Hampel, Russian spy

== See also ==
- Hampl
- Hempel
- Hample
