= Hample =

Hample is a surname. Notable people with the surname include:

- Dale Hample (born 1949), American academic
- Judy Hample (born 1947), American educator
- Stoo Hample (1926–2010), American writer, playwright, and cartoonist
- Zack Hample (born 1977), American baseball collector

== See also ==
- Hampel
