= Josef Hampl =

Czech artist

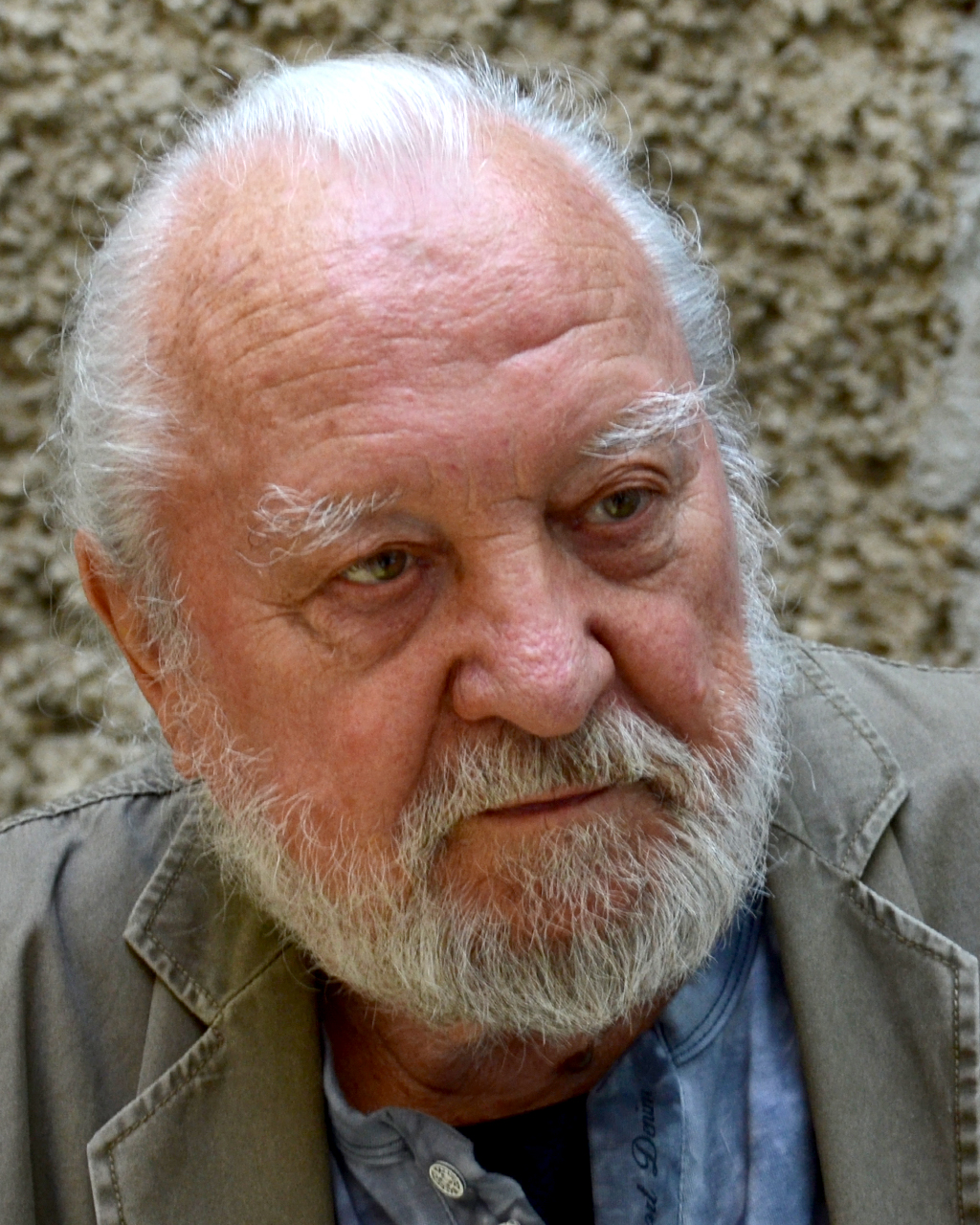
- Josef Hampl (2016)
- Born: 17 April 1932; Prague, Czechoslovakia
- Died: 25 March 2019 (aged 86)
- Education: private School of Decorative Arts in Prague
- Spouse: Hana Hamplová
- Awards: Vladimír Boudník Award for significant creative contribution to Czech graphic art (2017)

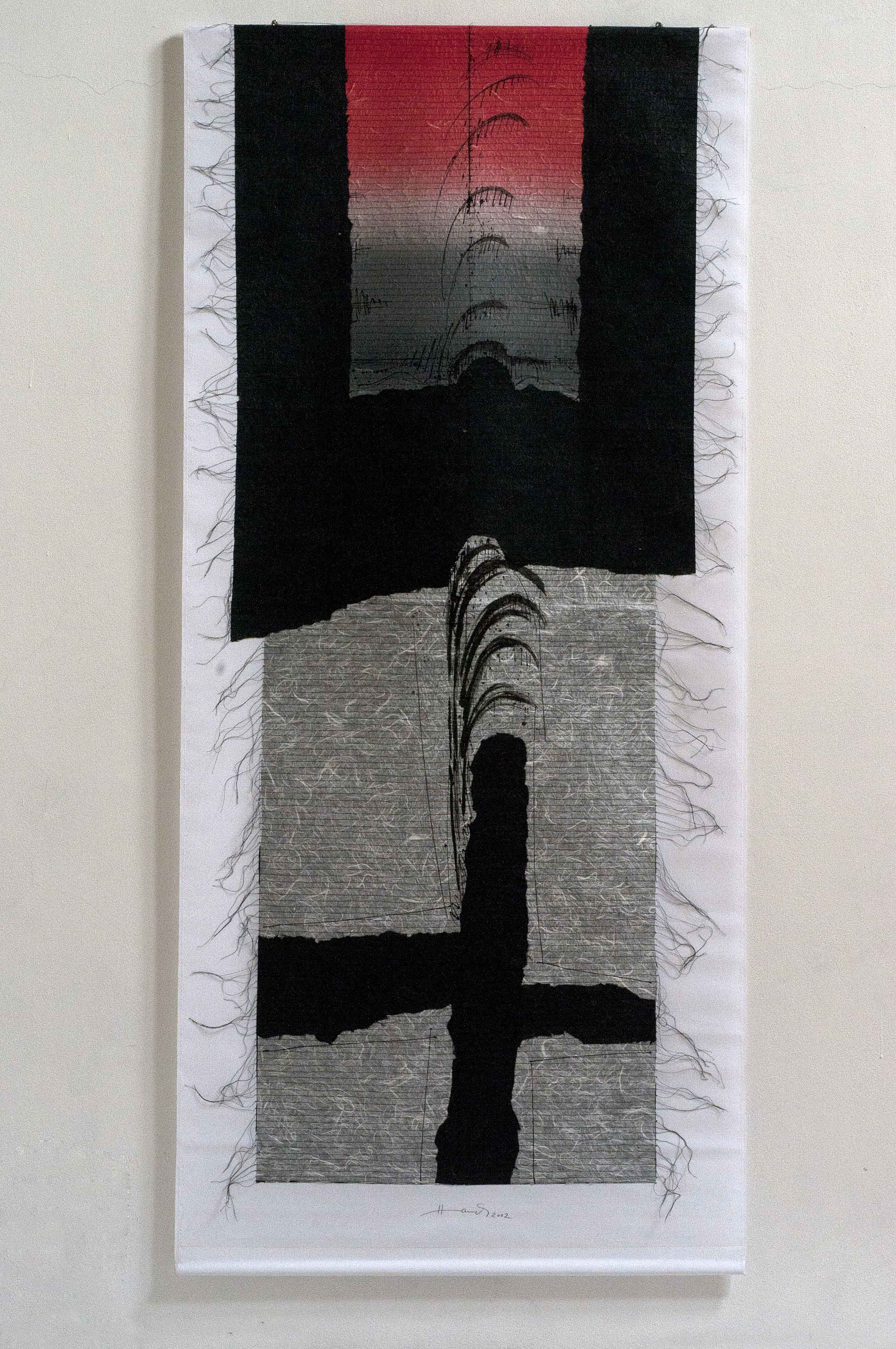
Josef Hampl, Capillary attraction, sewn collage on canvas, 200x90 cm, 2002

Josef Hampl (17 April 1932 – 25 March 2019) was a Czech collage artist, painter, sculptor, printmaker and creator of land art projects. He is one of the founders of Czech abstract art. As a world-famous author of the original technique of sewn collages, he is represented in many foreign collections.

== Biography ==
=== Early life and education ===
Hampl was born in Prague on 17 April 1932, into a family of a tailor and an amateur painter. After finishing school, he began apprenticing in his father's workshop, but the communist regime abolished virtually all trades during the 1950s. Hampl was given the choice between working in mines, steelworks or in the engineering industry. Eventually he found a job as a metalworker at the Praga factory in Vysočany. Here, after his work shift, he used an art studio where employees could paint or model under the guidance of external teachers.

At an exhibition at the factory trade union club in 1959, he met Vladimír Boudník, who was employed at the neighbouring Aero automobile factory. In addition to Boudník, Lubomír Přibyl also worked in the same factory and after being expelled from the Academy in 1959, he found employment there in the promotional department. Boudník introduced Hampl to his graphic techniques and got him acquainted with Bohumil Hrabal and Jiří Kolář. The Vysočany Circle, which Oldřich Hamera joined in the mid-1960s, is a unique phenomenon in the history of modern Czech art. The inspiring thought environment of the strong personalities of Boudník, Hrabal and Kolář, as well as the everyday raw reality of factory work, marked a turning point in the aesthetic understanding and technical processing of artistic artefacts.

In 1955–1960 Josef Hampl studied at the private School of Decorative Arts in Prague under Prof. Jaroslav Masák and with sculptor Ivan Lošák from the Prague Ukrainian Academy. He also attended evening lectures on art history at the Václav Hollar Art School (prof. J. Wage) and participated in plein-air painting in South Bohemia with other students. Books on modern art were lent to him by Jiří Kolář, who was also his first critic and collector. He could not consider studying properly at art school in the 1950s because he came from a family of tradesmen. After leaving the army he was also prevented from studying by concern for his family.

Hampl died on 25 March 2019.

=== As an independent artist ===
Josef Hampl has been exhibiting independently since 1964. During the temporary relaxation of the regime in the second half of the 1960s, he was offered a job as an assistant in the graphic workshop of the Academy of Fine Arts in Prague, which served the studios of Prof. Vojtěch Tittelbach, Ladislav Čepelák and Jiří John. After the Warsaw Pact invasion of Czechoslovakia he survived here the entire period of normalization. In 1978 he married Hana Hovorková.

While in Czechoslovakia he exhibited only in small unofficial galleries, throughout the 1970s and 1980s he was invited to graphic art shows around the world and became well known in Belgium, Germany, Austria, Spain, Italy, Hungary, France, Poland, Japan and the United States. Since the late 1960s, he has also worked inconsistently as a sculptor and has carried out 30 events and installations in outdoor and indoor settings. Since the 1970s he has participated in Mail art projects worldwide.

By 2017 he had 84 solo exhibitions in the Czech Republic and participated in 600 group exhibitions, 380 of which were abroad. After 2000 he worked in his studio in the countryside for most of the year and then settled there in 2009. He was a member of the art department of the Umělecká beseda, the free association Papirial and the Künstlergilde in Germany.

=== Awards ===
- 23rd Vladimír Boudník Award for significant creative contribution to Czech graphic art (2017)

== Work ==
In the 1950s, Josef Hampl learned realistic painting and tried various printmaking techniques (drypoint, linocut, woodcut). His acquaintance with Vladimír Boudník influenced his further work. In 1959–1962, he worked with structural and active graphics and made blind prints from relief matrices (Active print, 1959). In his abstract structural paintings he used, for example, found scratches of industrial synthetic paints or sand with synthetic binder as relief elements (Slow Catastrophe, 1963, Blue Unrest, 1965). His work from the first half of the 1960s is characterized by a creative search and exploration of other artistic means in an attempt to counter and overcome the strong impulse of Boudník's graphic work.

In 1964–1965, circular motifs as symbols of the planets predominate in his graphic sheets, created using a variety of techniques. The paintings have dark colours and usually combine structural graphics with relief painting or assemblage (Space of Silence, 1965). He also created a series of prints using frottage calligraphic script from old Jewish tombstones (Kafka, monofrottage, 1969). The need for a fixed order gradually prevailed in his works, and in a series of so-called counter-types from the late 1960s, he combined abstract monotypes with regular grids created using stencils.

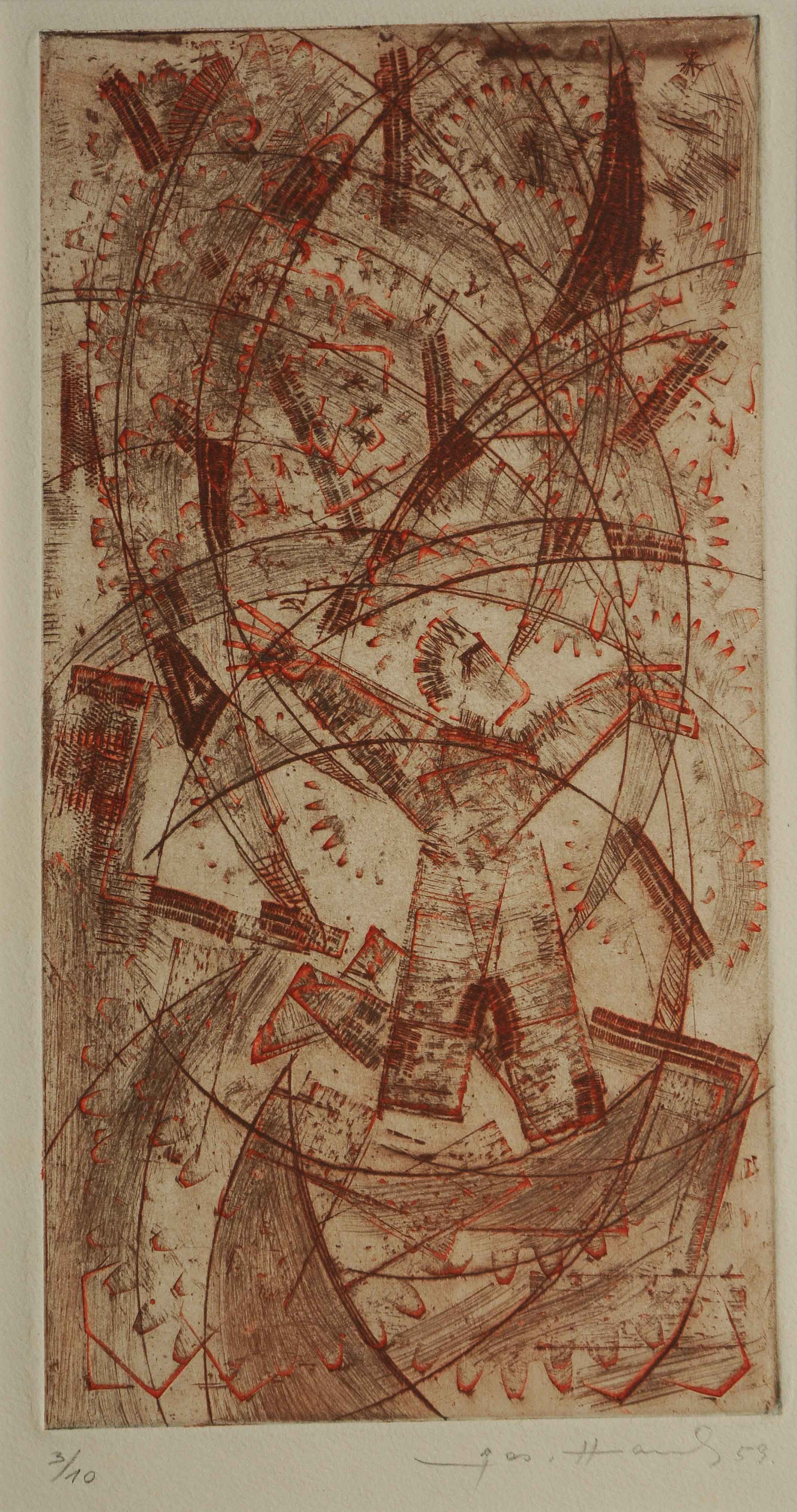
Untitled, active print, 1959

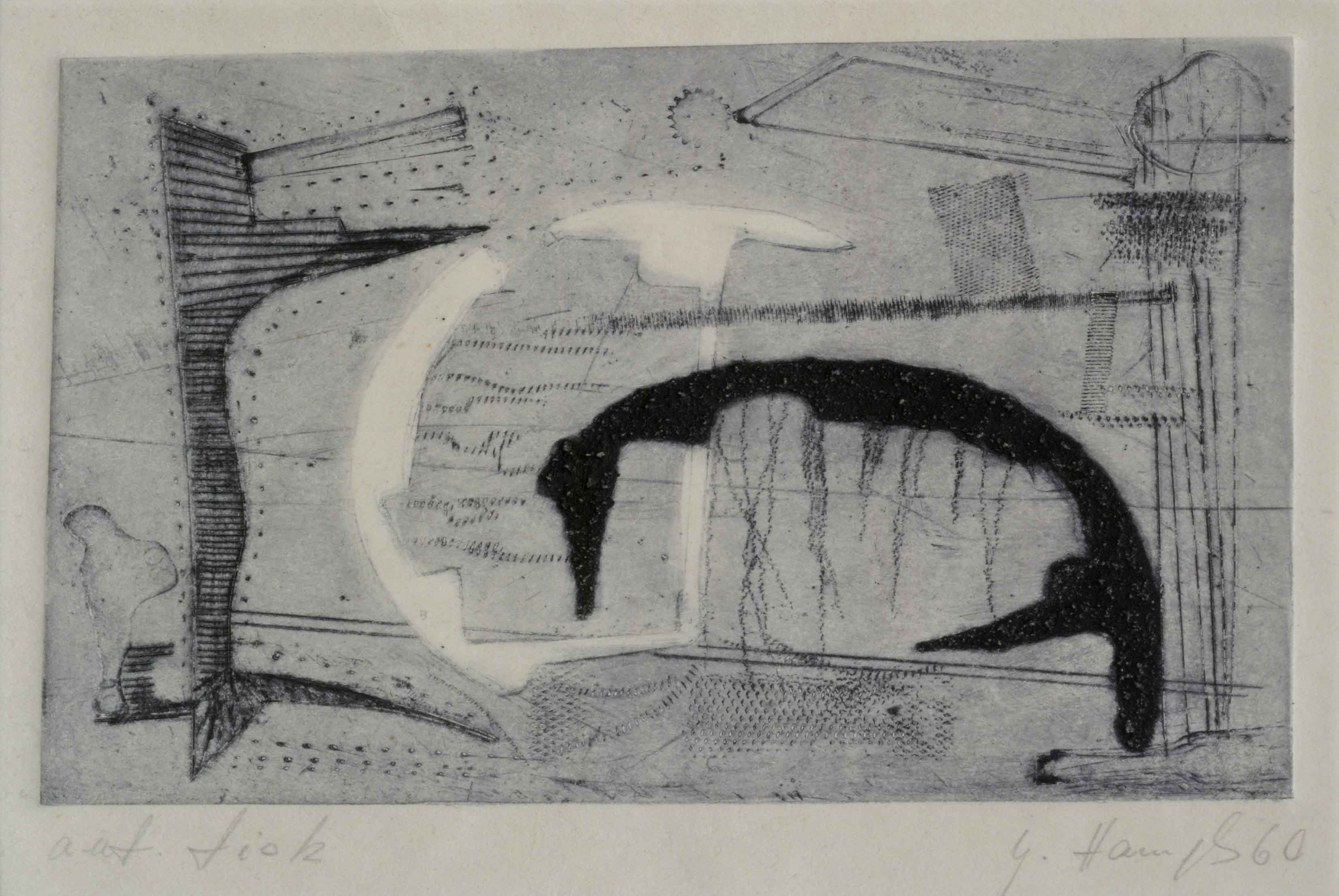
Musical Composition, combined technique, 1960

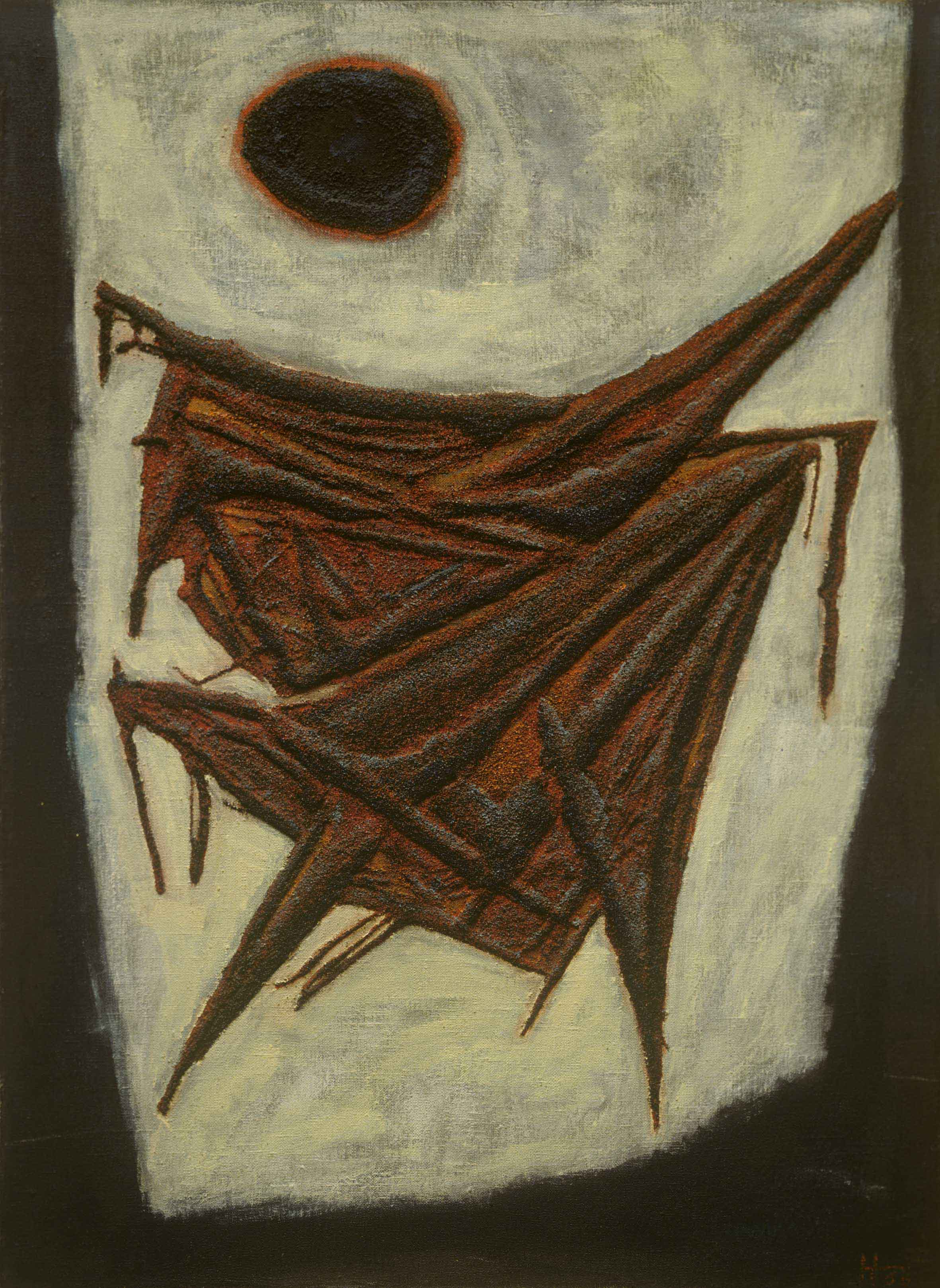
Slow Catastrophe, mixed media, 1963

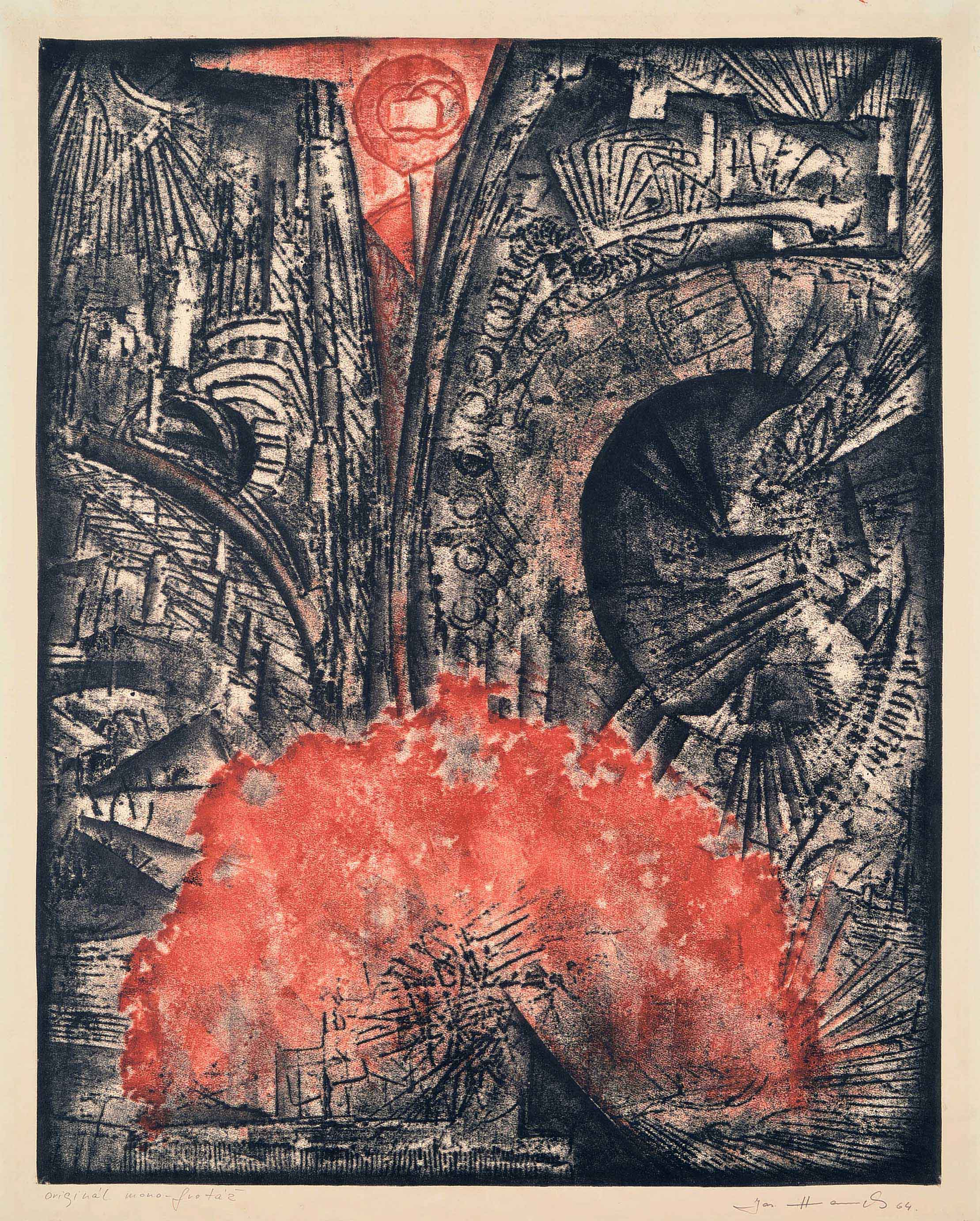
Eruption I., monotype, 1964

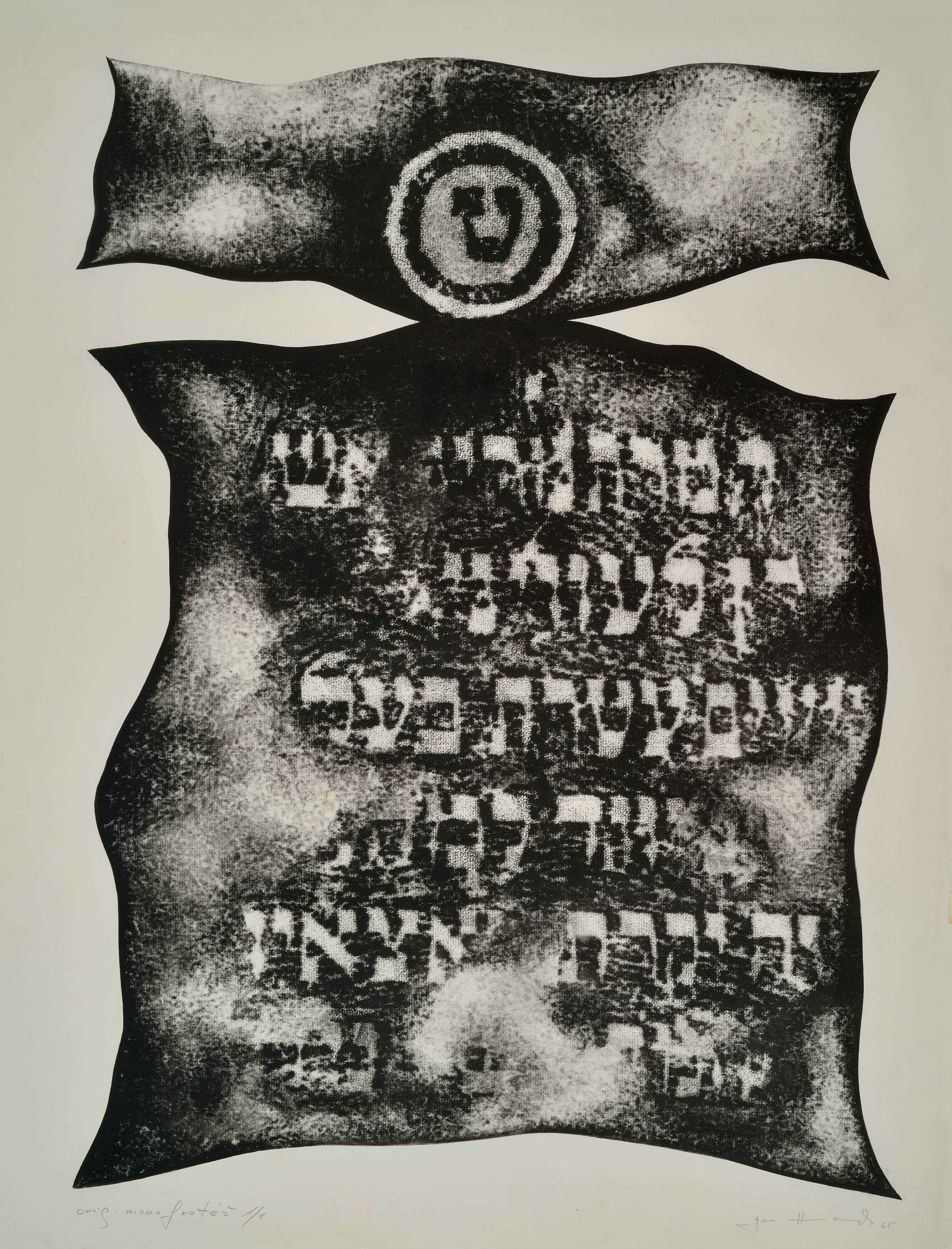
Untitled, monofrottage, 1965

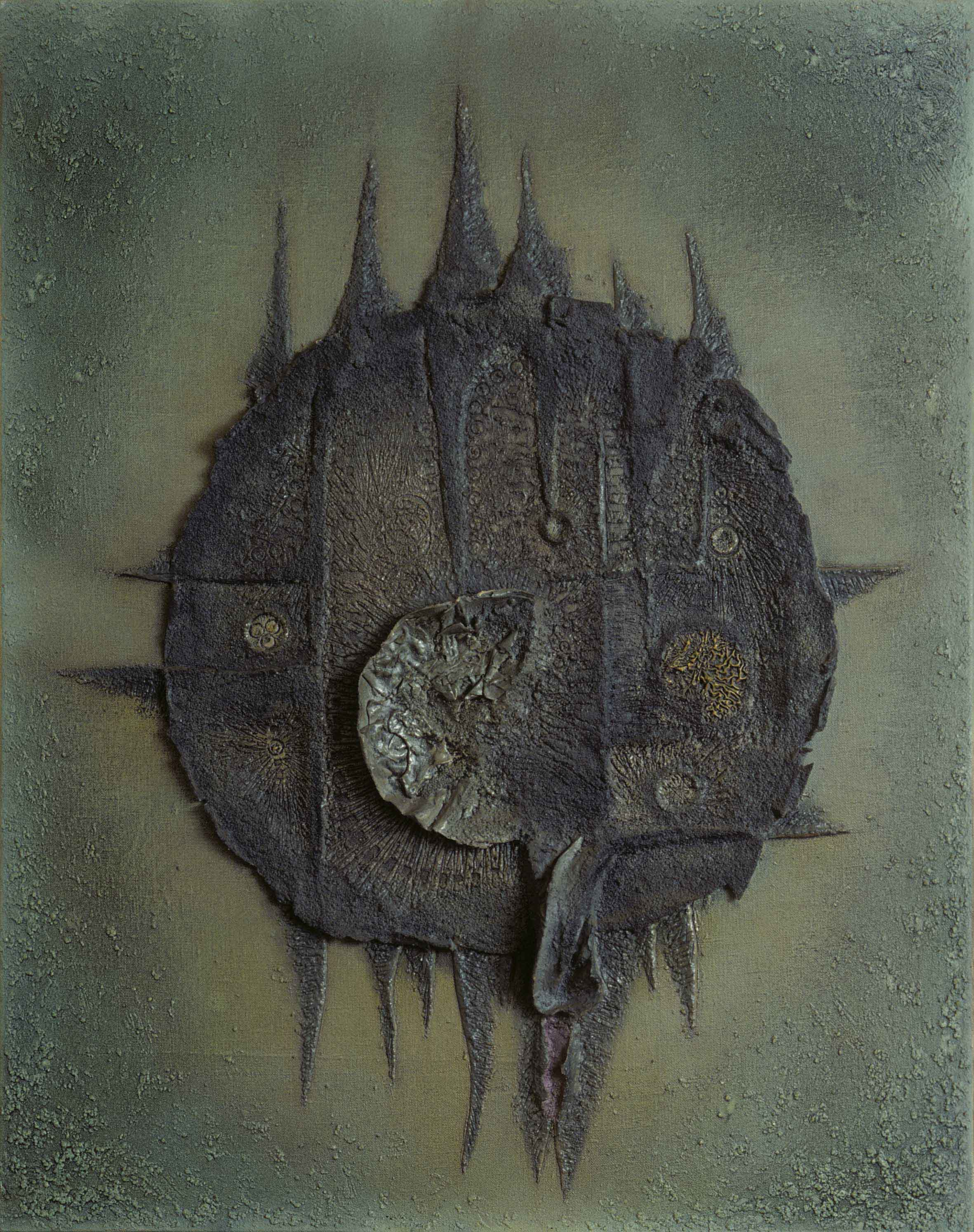
Space of Silence, combined technique, 1965–66

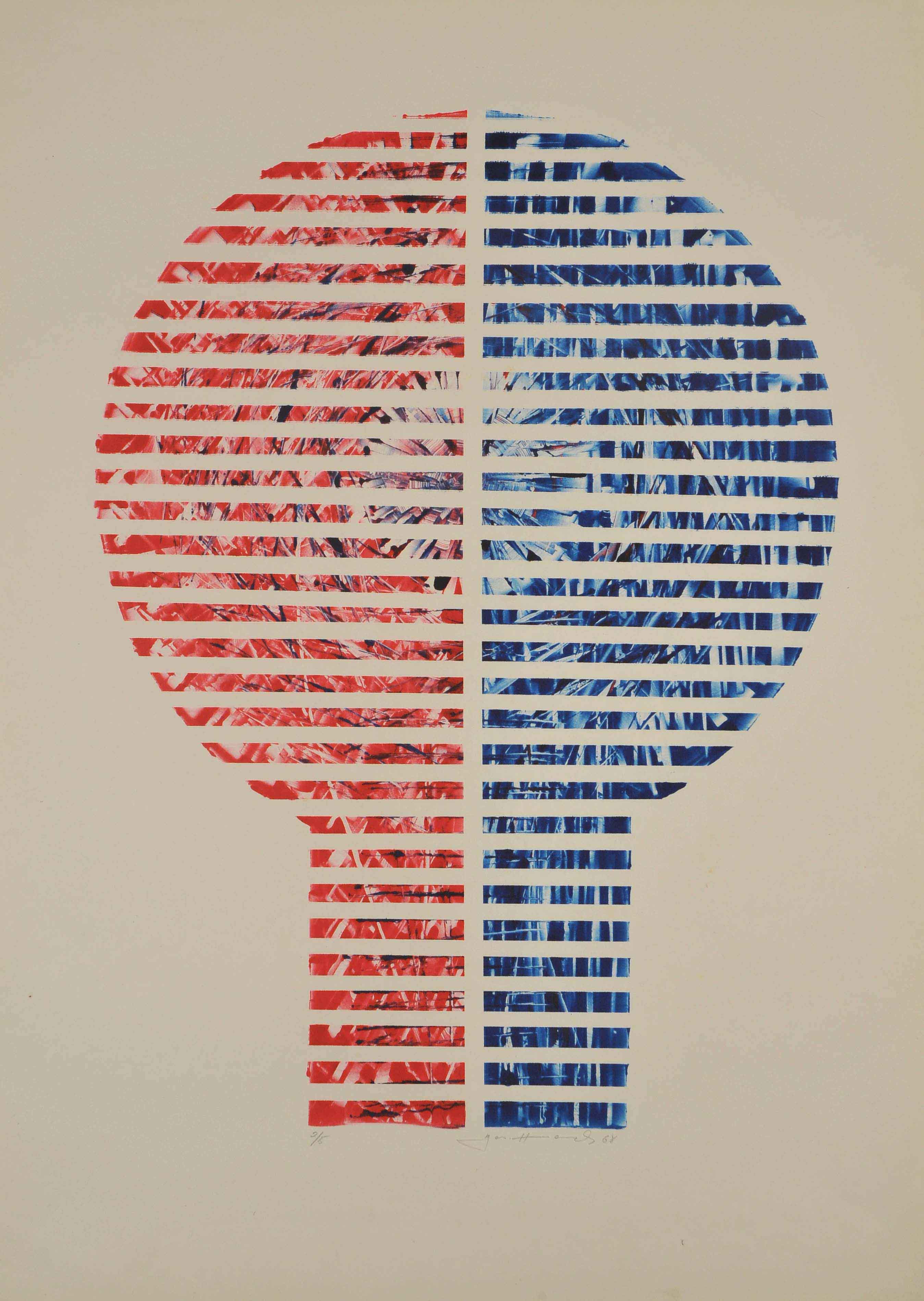
Head IX, counter-type, 1968

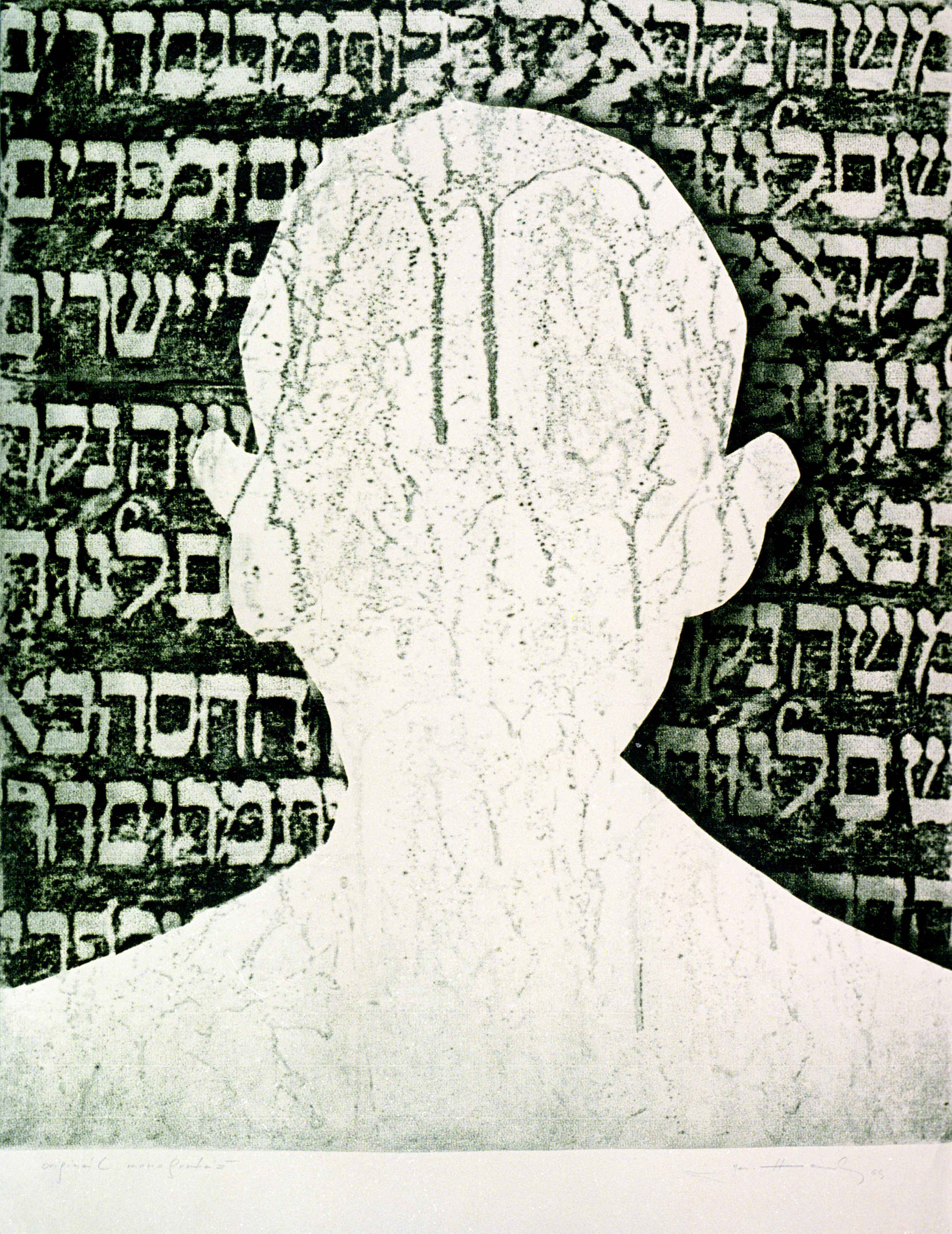
Kafka, monofrottage, 1969

At the beginning of the 1970s, Hampl's work developed under the sign of a "new sensibility", shaped by signal colours and working with purely geometric elements. His drawings from 1974, on the other hand, are minimalist geometric patterns, where the artist makes do only with red lines bordered by black lines. Offset black and white prints on canvas and monochrome geometric relief patterns from 1976 to 1977 already partly anticipate some of the sewn collages of the 1980s in their arrangement. Hampl's geometric compositions, with their meditative quality, break out of the classical tendencies of concrete art of the time.

The period of normalization was characterised by various private happenings and conceptual art events in nature (R. Němec, E. Brikcius, I. Kafka, J. Beránek). In 1976, Josef Hampl, in collaboration with his third wife, the photographer Hana Hamplová, created a series of spatial installations using long strips of organdy, called Action arrow. In the 1980s he continued these activities (Games with a Cube, 1982, Crossing, 1983, Chmelnice Mutějovice, 1983, Labyrinth, 1984, Stairway to Heaven, 1985).

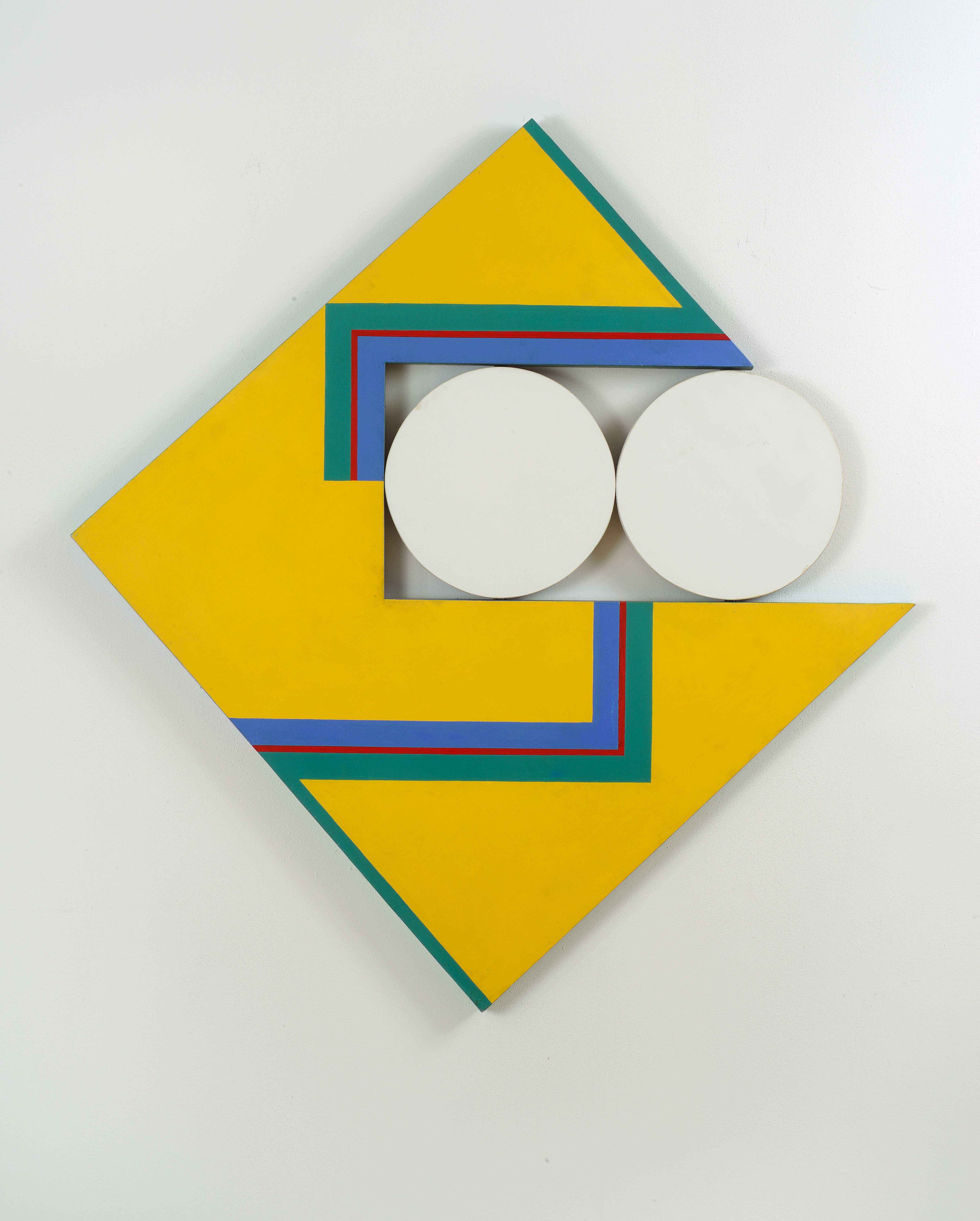
Series RB 20–70, oil on plywood, laminated chipboard, 137x137 cm, 1970

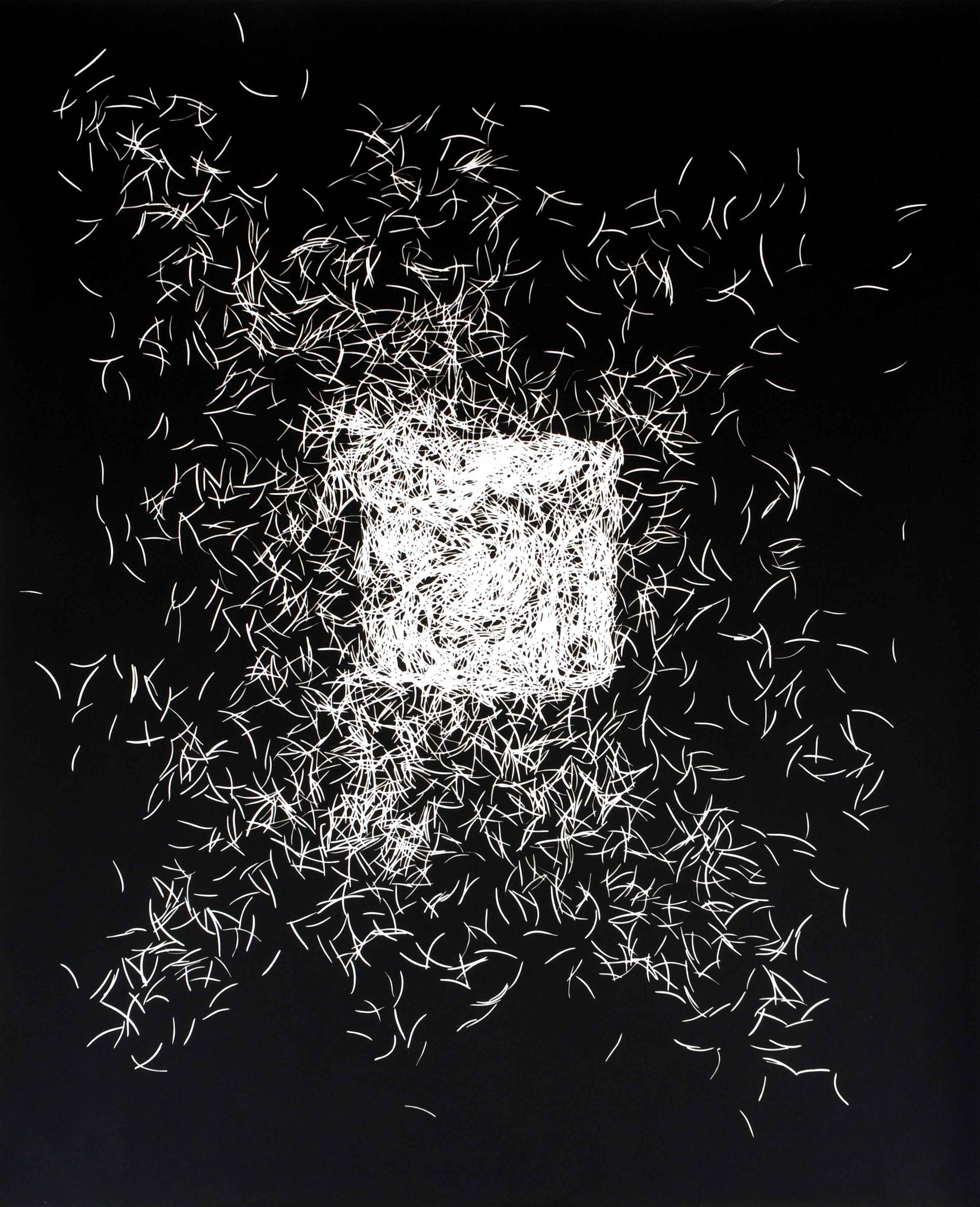
Untitled, photogram 4, 1975

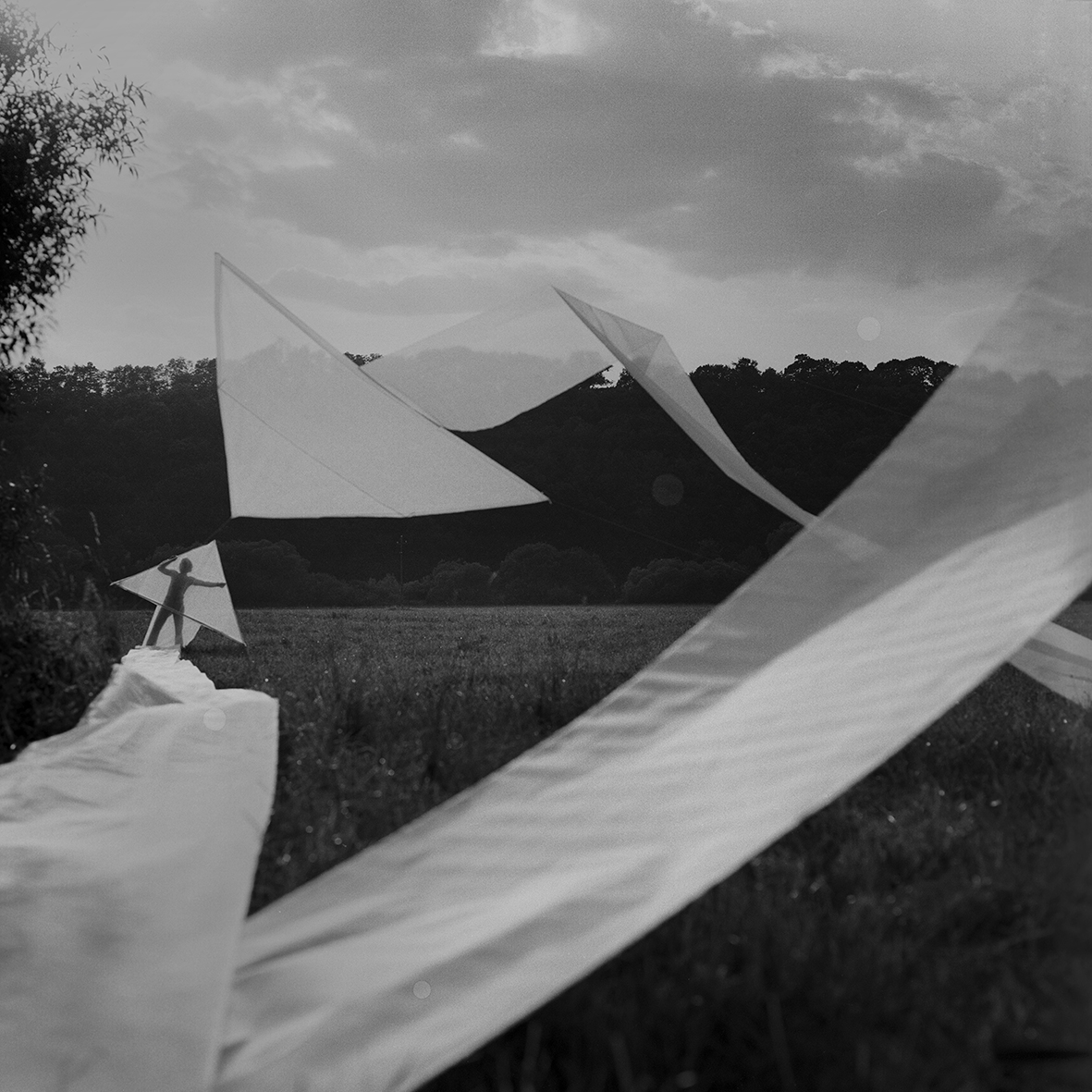
Action Arrow, organtine 50x1 m, 1976

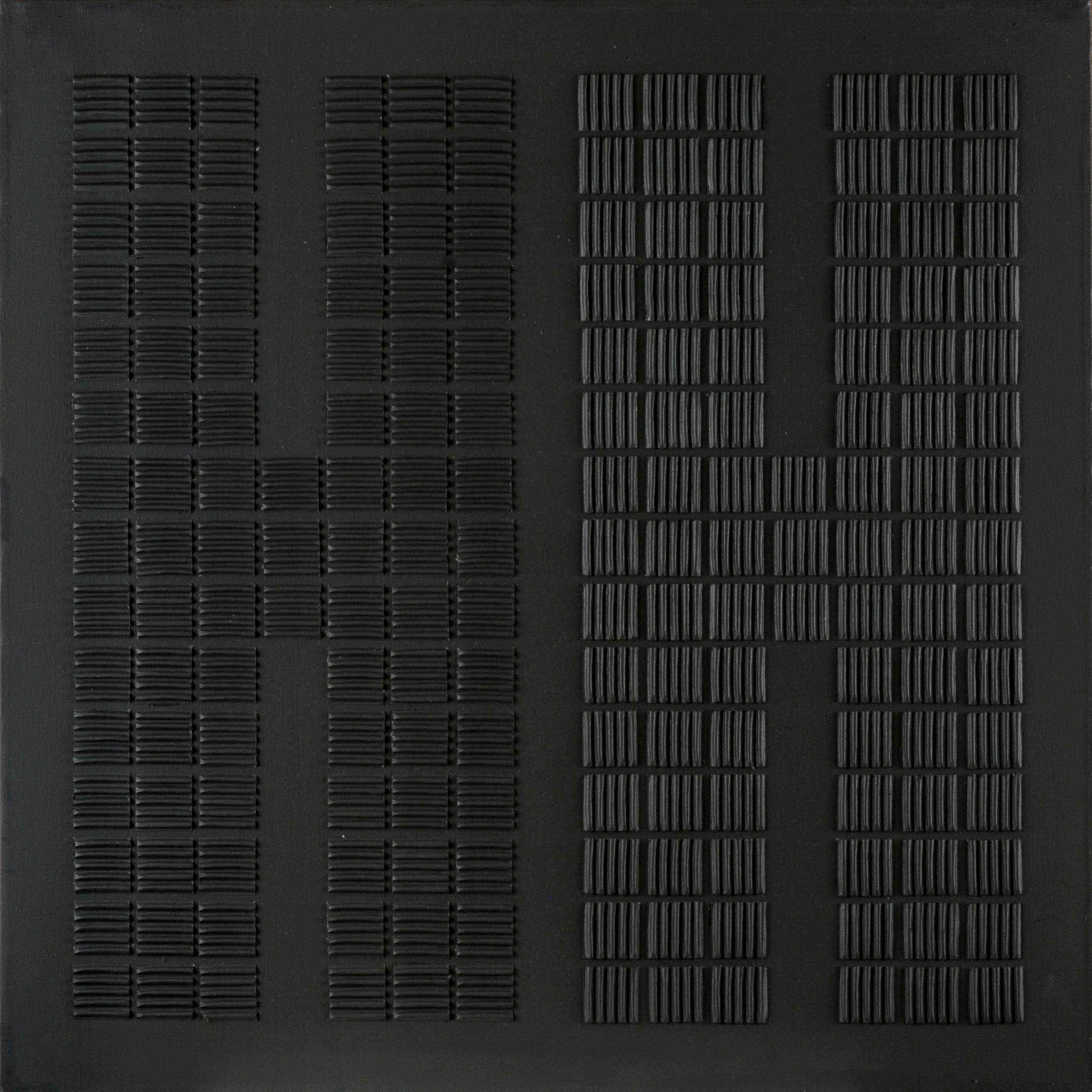
H system (3), mixed media, 60x60 cm, 1977

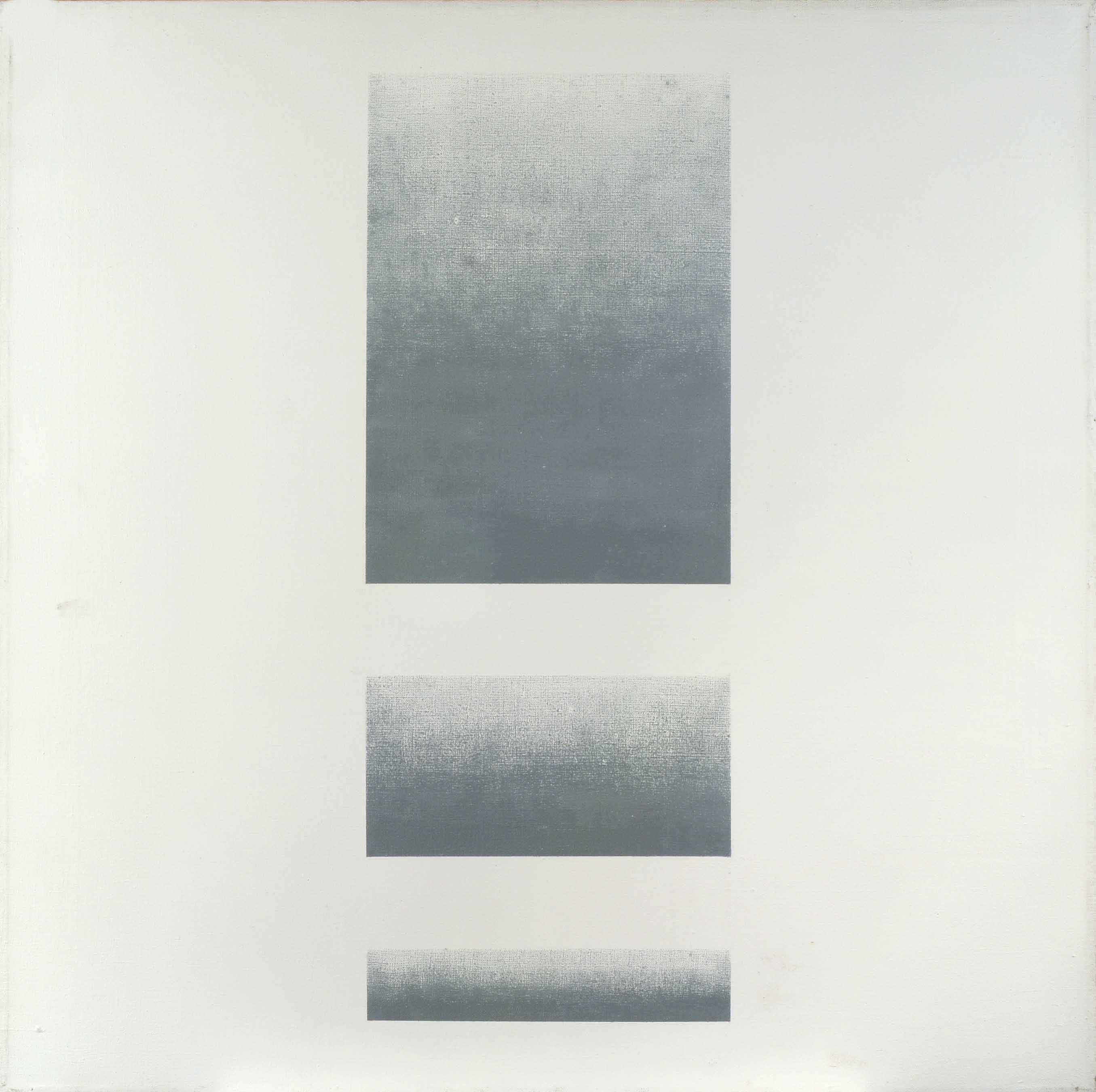
A (7), offset on canvas, 60x60 cm, 1977

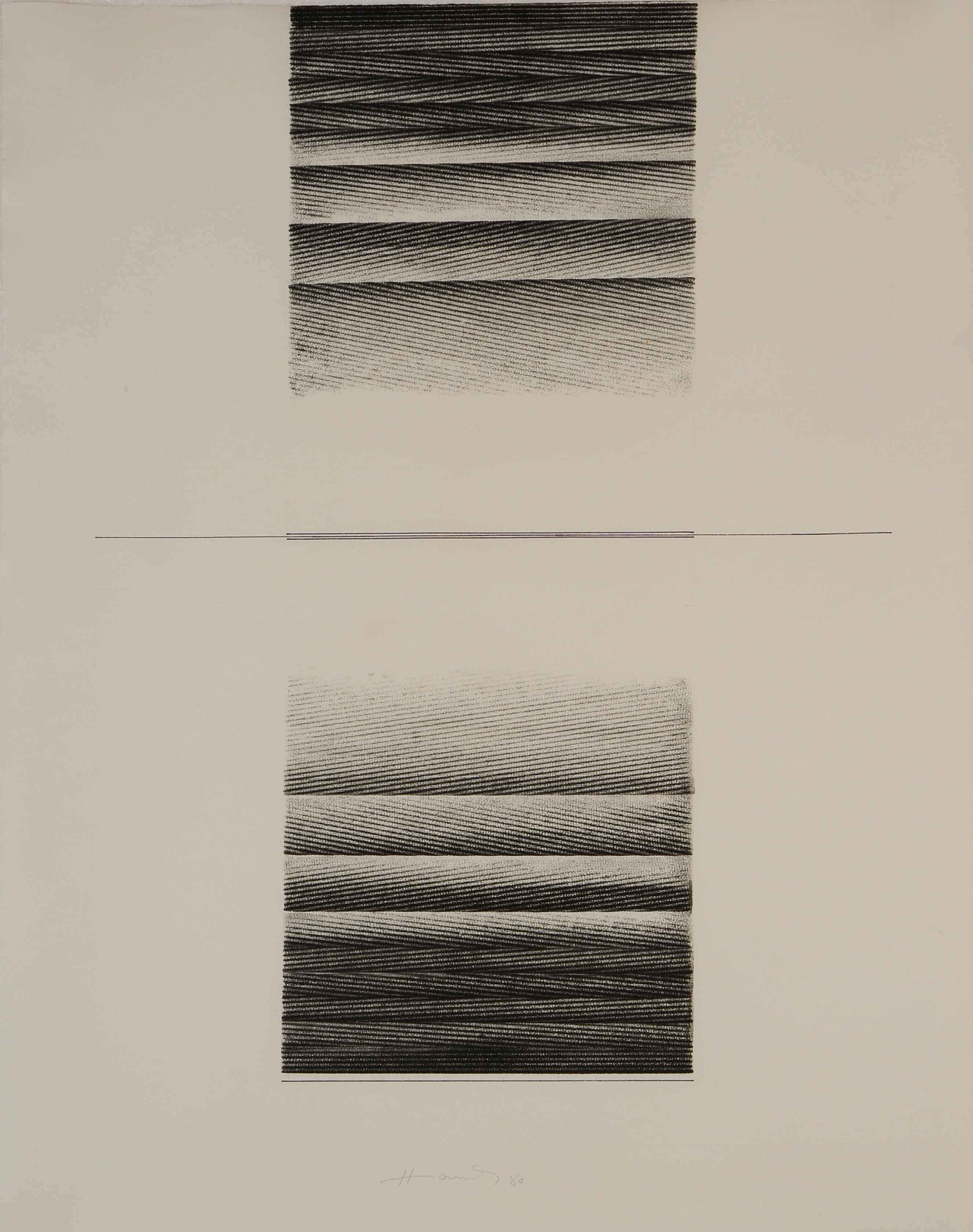
Rotation of a hatch 2, frottage, 62x48 cm, 1980

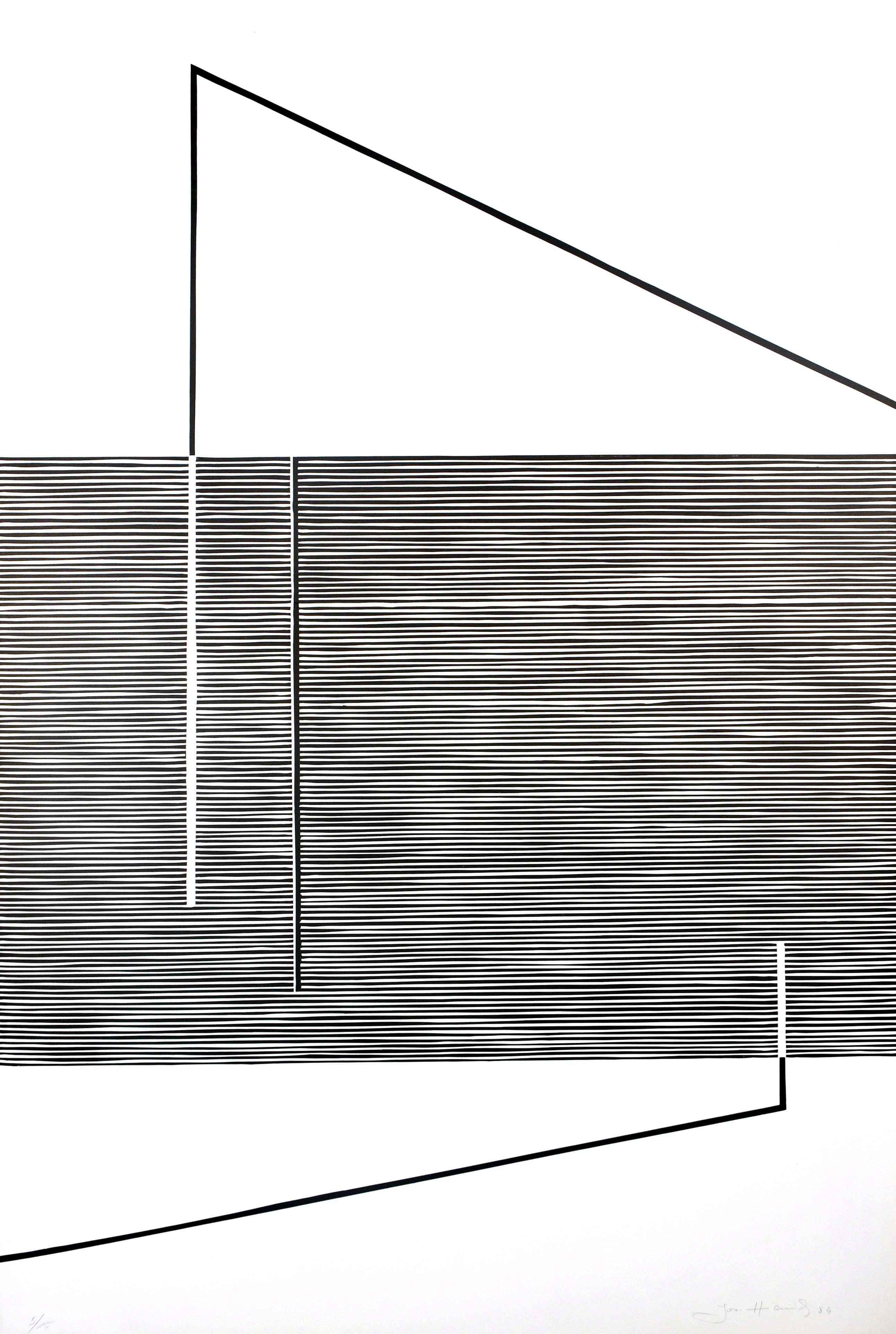
Sector II, linocut and perforation, 90x60 cm, 1984

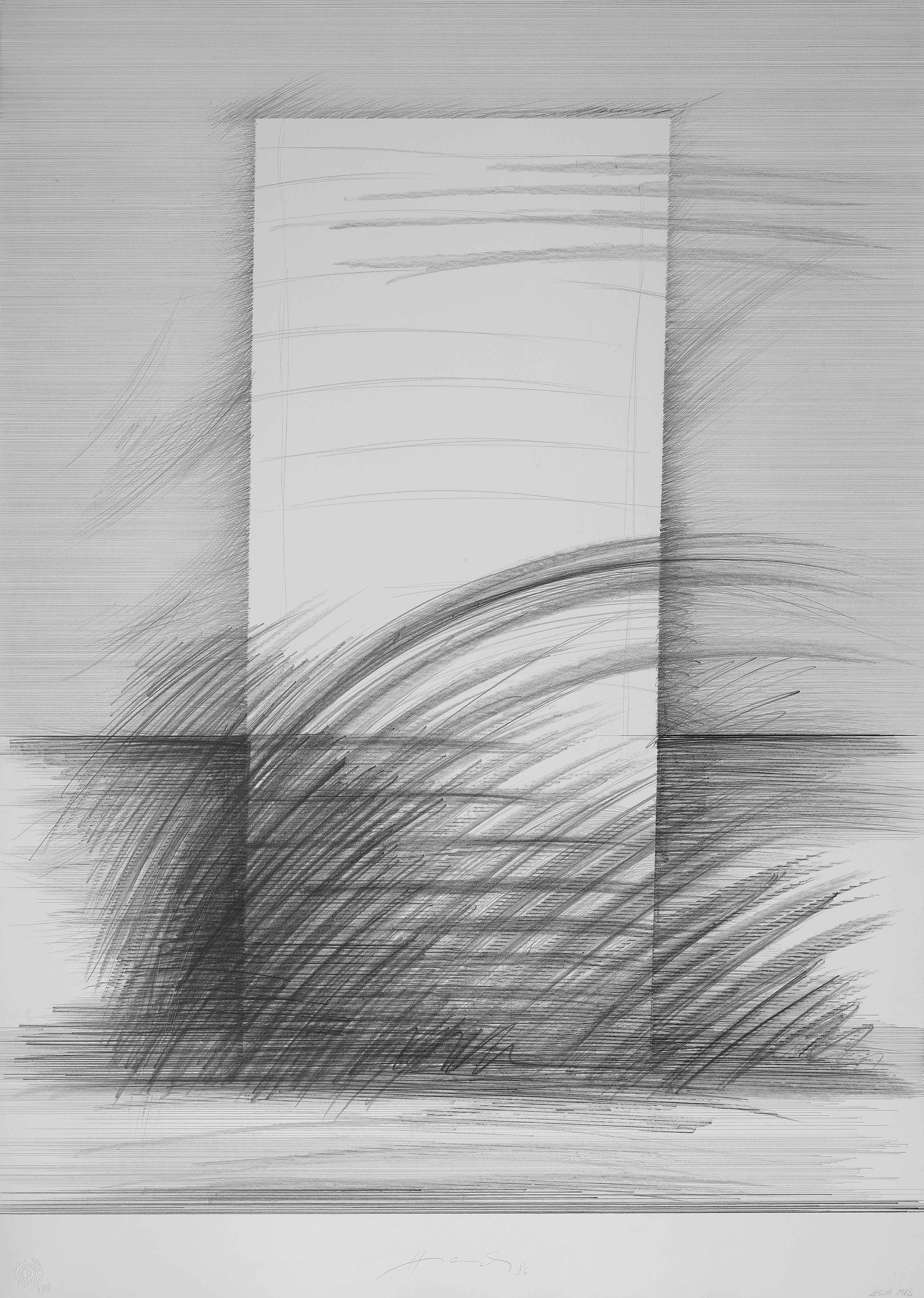
From cycle IX, drawing and perforation, 1986

In the graphic sheets and pencil drawings combined with frottage and perforation (Horizontal Structure - Dialogue, 1980, Hatching 22, 1980), the consistent horizontal arrangement of the composition that is characteristic of the first sewn paper collages (Layering with Blue, 1984) and the black and white drawings combined with sewing from the mid-1980s already appears. The very title of the entire large-scale series, The Unpredictable Games (1982-1987), with its concentrated meditative symbolism of subtly rhythmic patterns, speaks to the sensitivity and vulnerability of the human soul and nature. The simple drawing patterns combined with tufts of loose black threads, which are a continuation of the drawing in space, give a pure and fragile impression of Japanese calligraphy on the white canvas, divided by horizontal stitched black lines. The large-scale works to be hung between two round pieces of wood, kept in a roll, are in principle actually Japanese Kakemona i.e. a hanging thing or Kakejiku - a hanging scroll.

The combination of the constructivist arrangement of the pictorial surface with the regular horizontal grid created by sewing became a completely new and original contribution of Josef Hampl to the technique of collage itself. Some of the works are monumental in size (Synthesis, 300 x 640 cm, 1985, Wedge Landscape, Wedge of Landscape, object 800 x 400 x 300 cm, 1988). In later years, the artist used materials that contrast in colour or texture to create collages. In addition to various kinds of handmade papers, whose aesthetic effect lies in the changing surface texture and irregular composition of the matrix, he uses the contrast of the absolute blackness of angular punched papers, scraps of photographs, colored posters, tailor's cuts, used tea bags, wasps' nests, etc. Instead of sewing, he sometimes attaches scraps of paper with paper clips, which then act as linear drawings (Horizontal EPP 2, 2000) or create autonomous dynamic patterns (Probe - Lung, 1999, Finding, 2004).

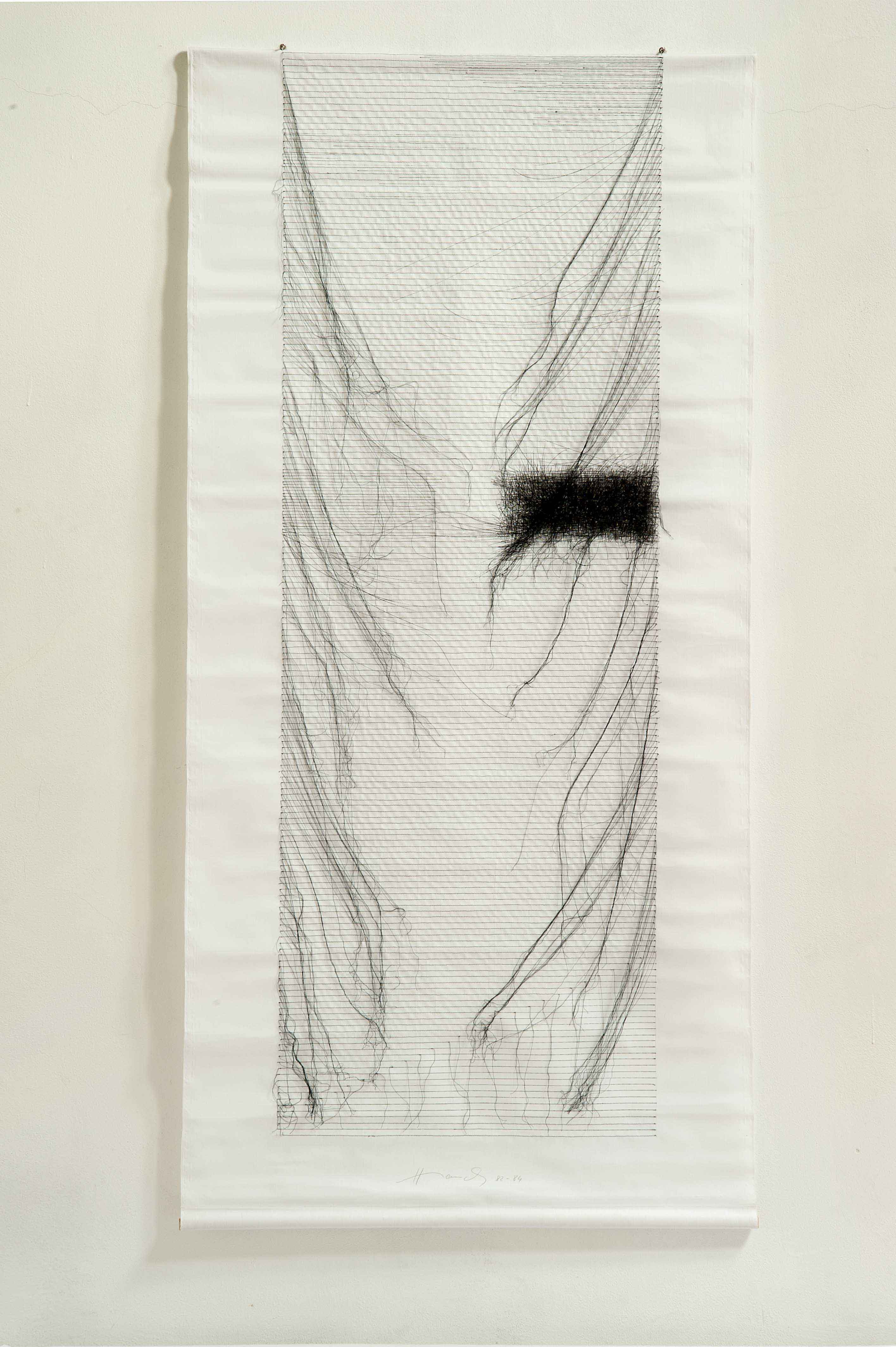
Untitled, sewn drawing on canvas, 1982–84

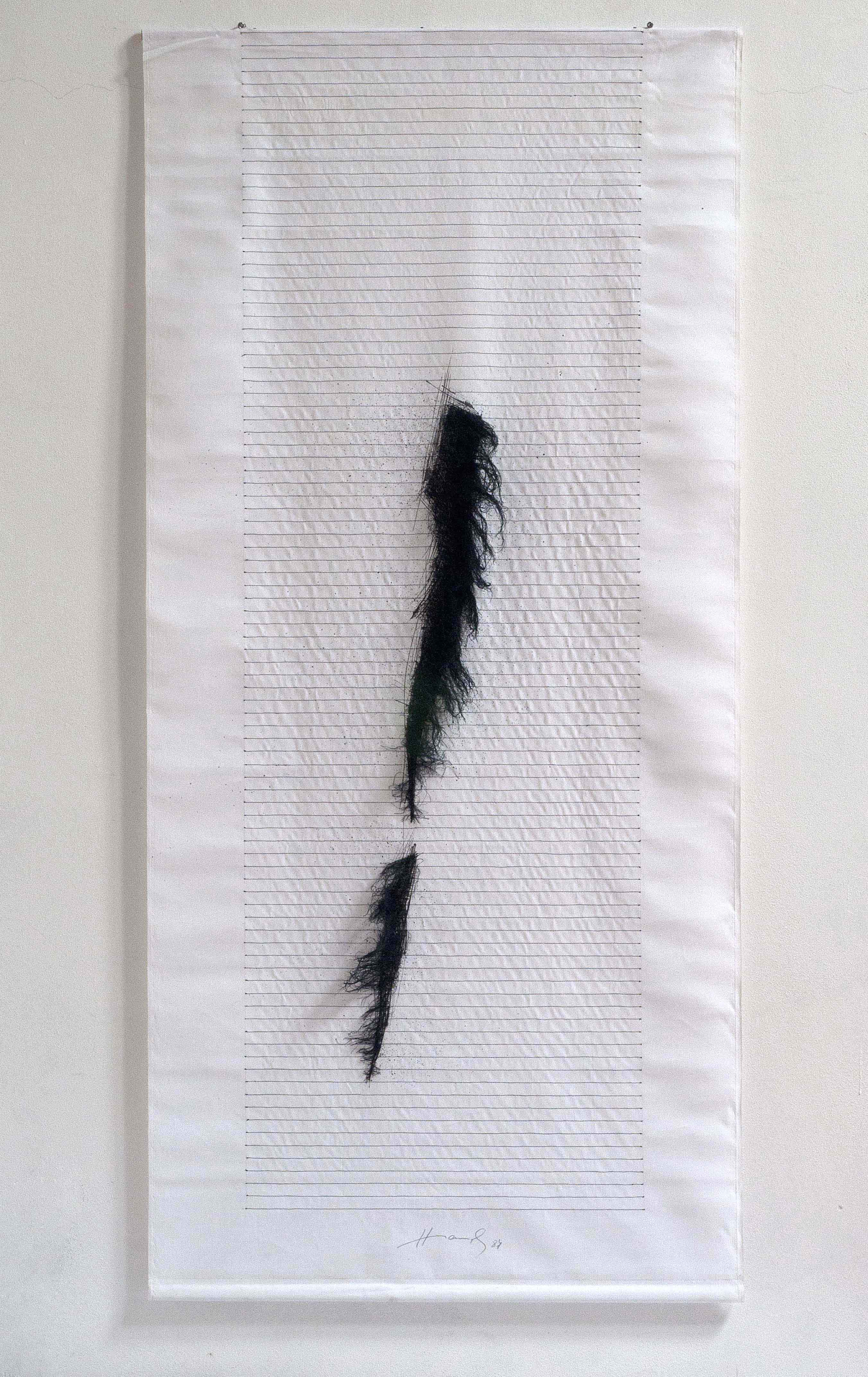
Unpredictable Games XIX, sewn drawing on canvas, 1987

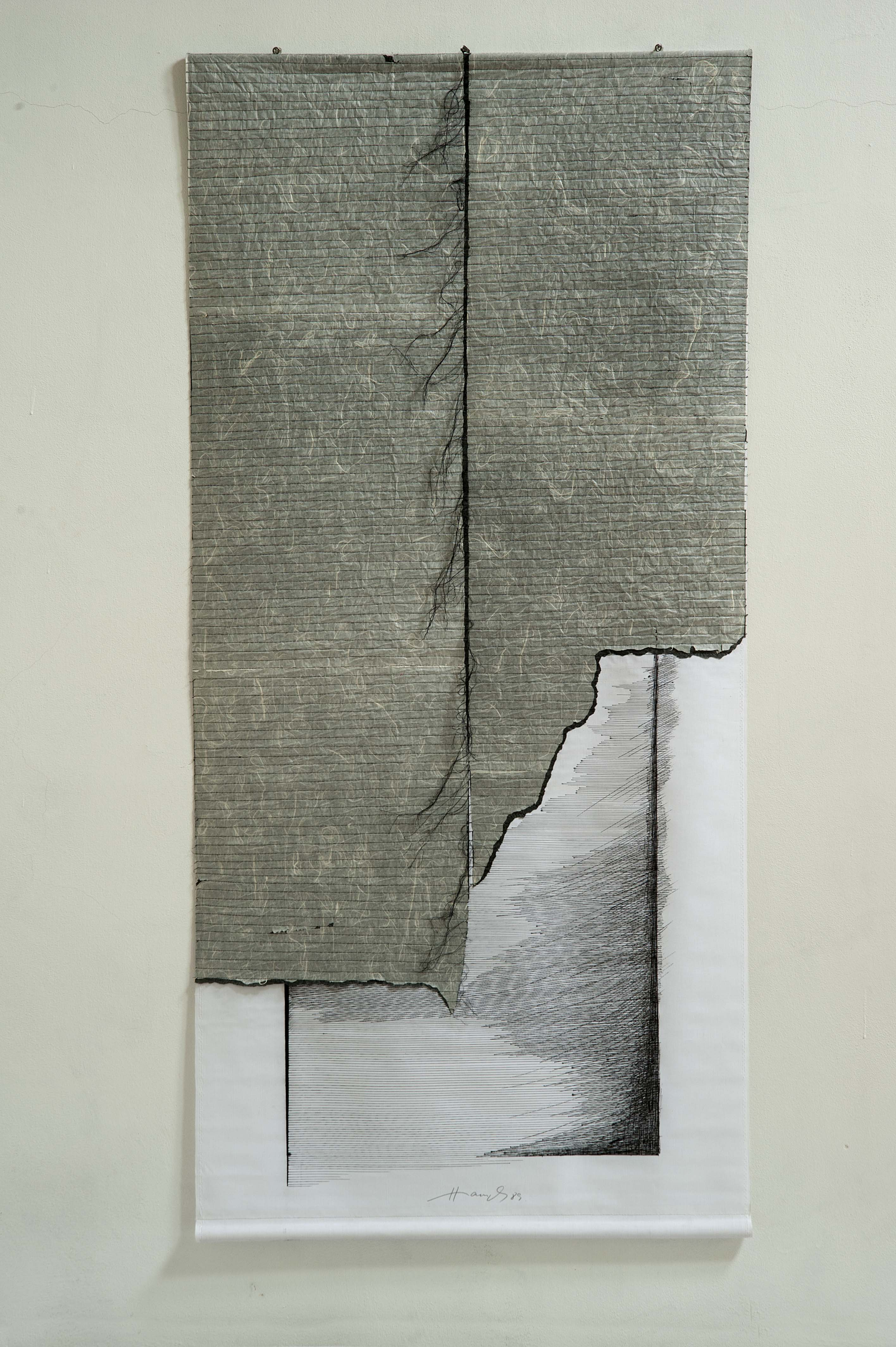
Untitled, sewn collage on canvas, 1989

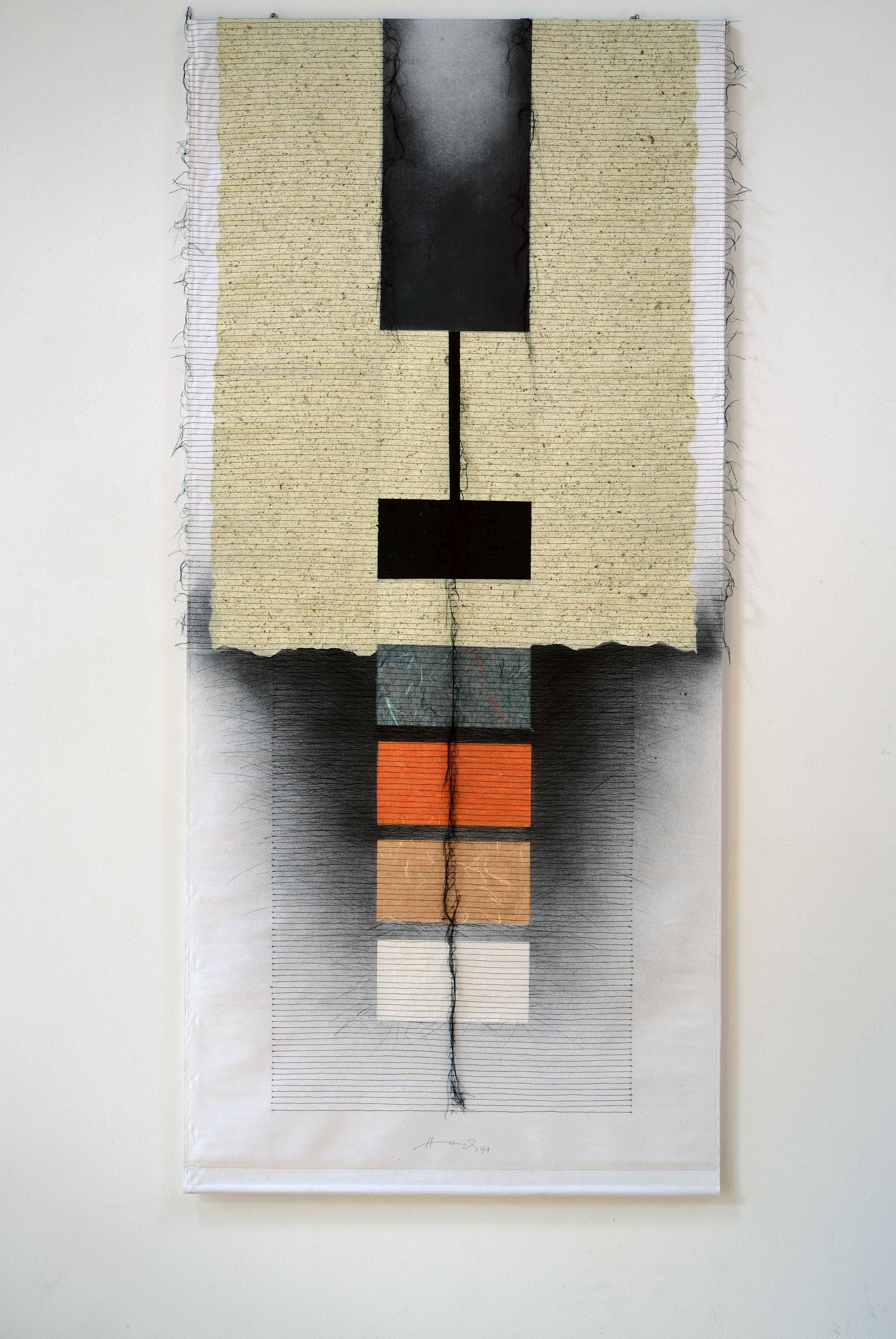
Report, sewn collage and pen drawing on canvas, 1991

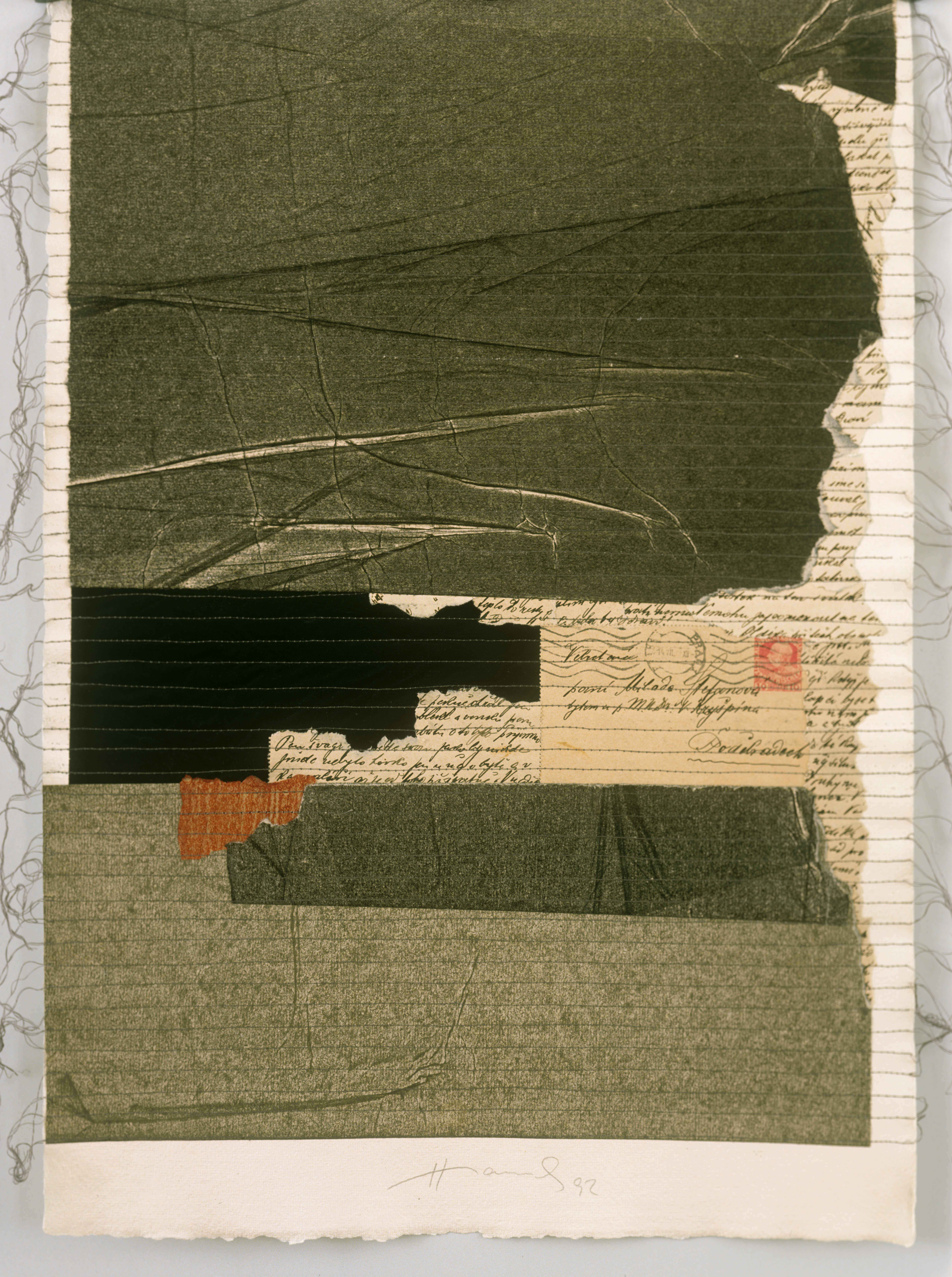
Untitled, sewn collage, 1992

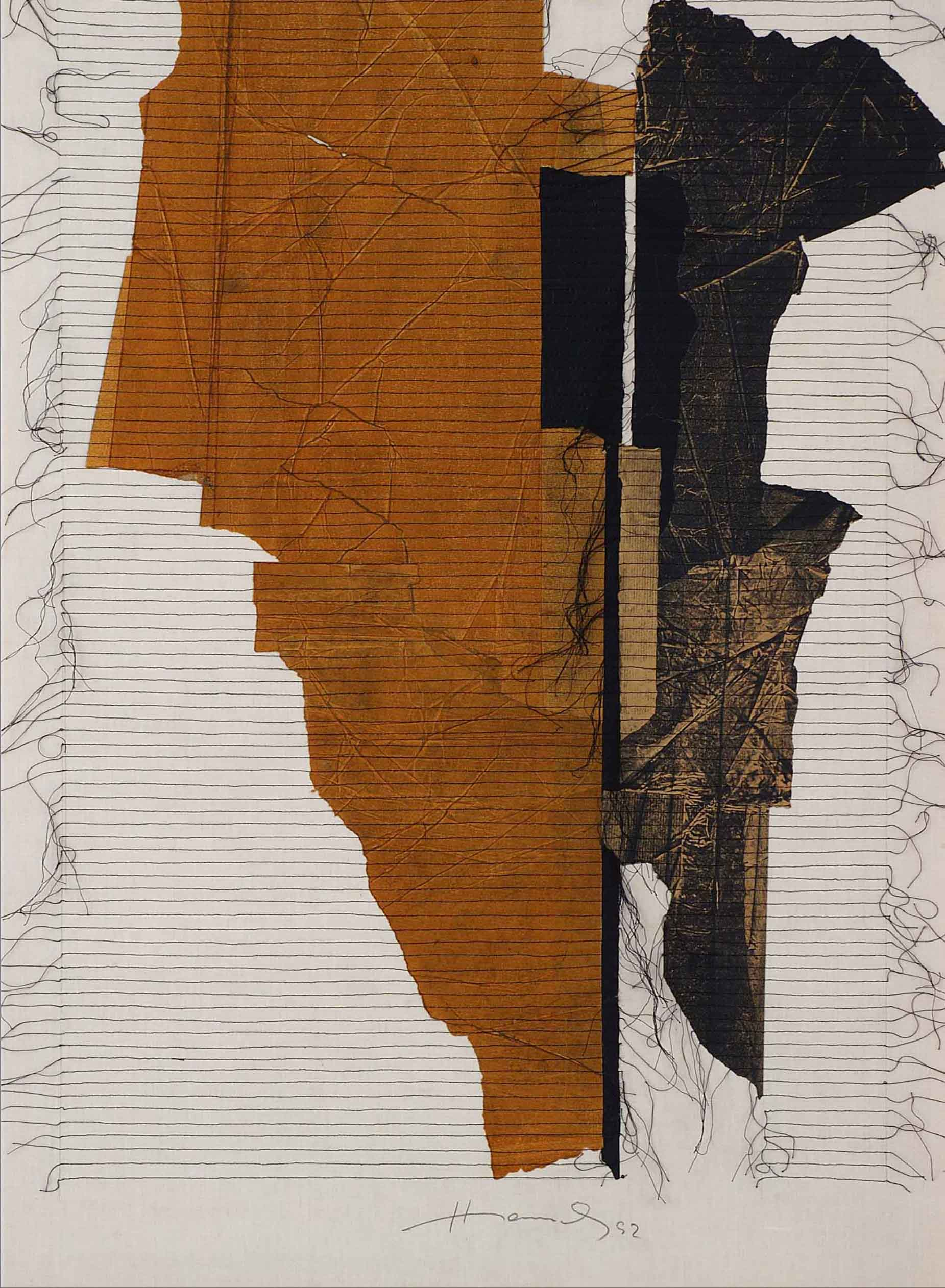
Figure III, sewn collage on canvas, 1994

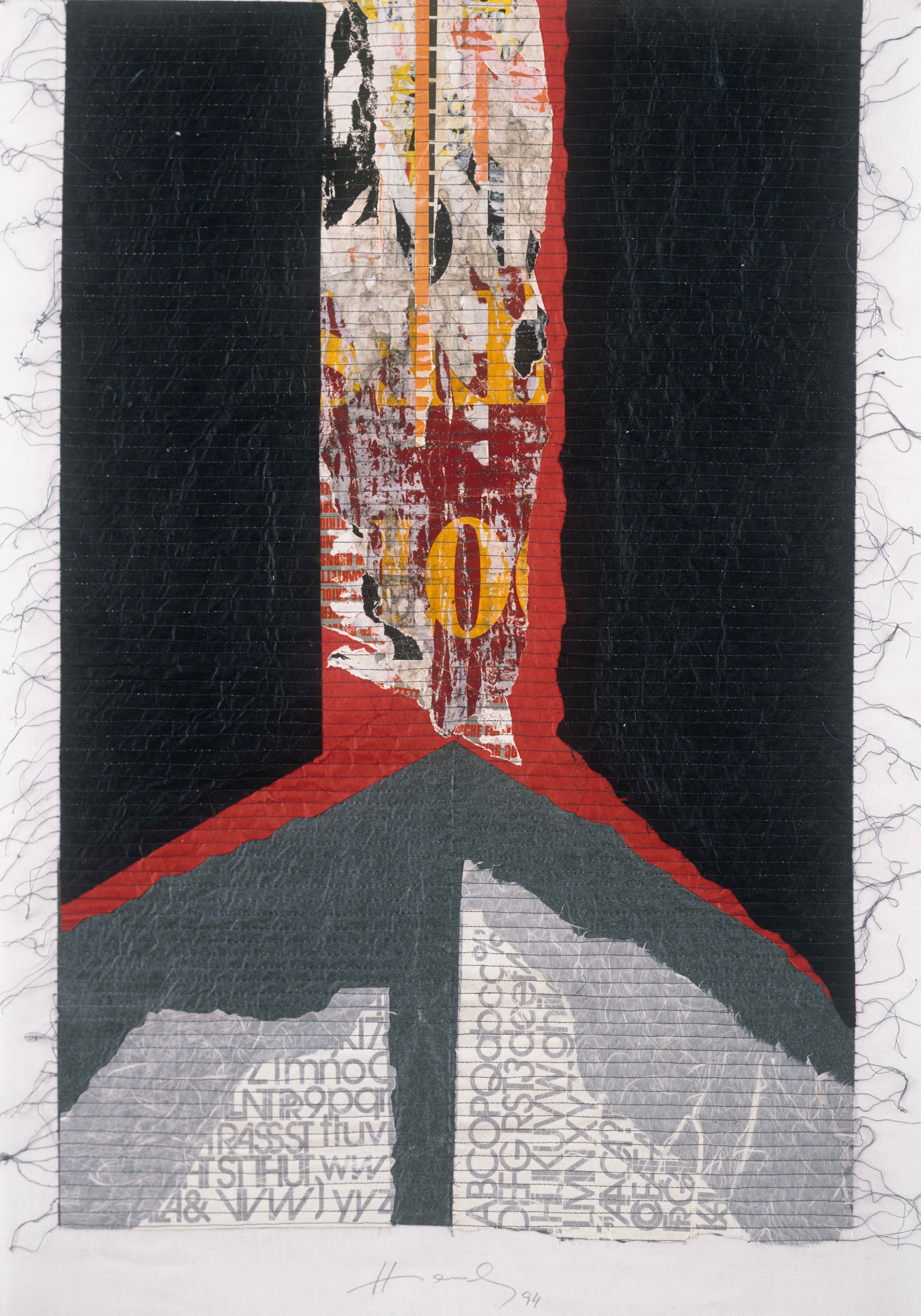
Untitled, collage on canvas, 1994

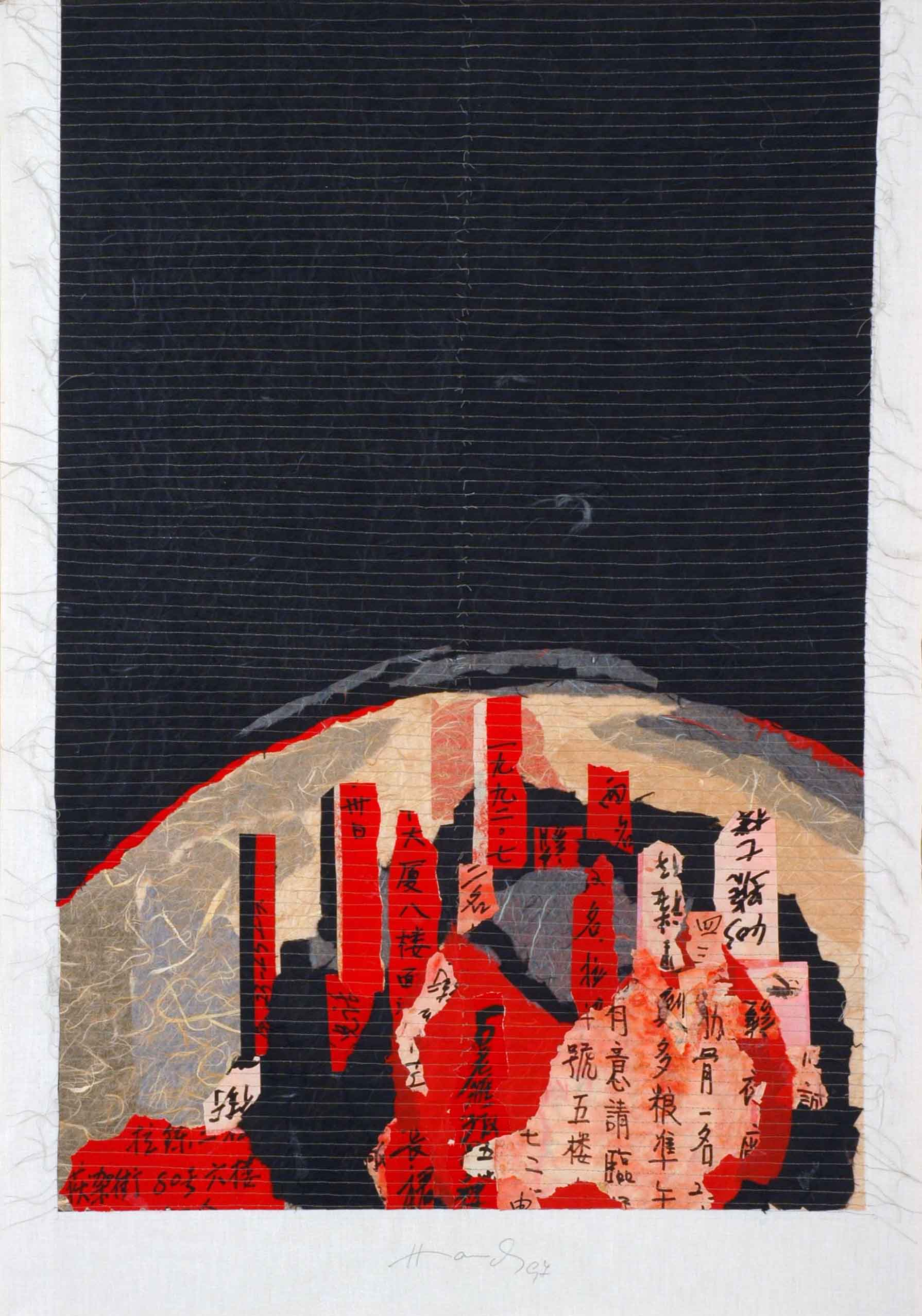
Chinatown New York, collage on canvas, 1997

In some collages, the principle of free layering of diverse structures prevails, in others a strict geometric order and interpenetration of surfaces and spatial plans. In an extensive series Roušky - Veils (1990-1991), the vertical axis of the collage contrasts with the edges in its structure or colour, and the deliberate asymmetry of the drawing brings a dynamic element to the quiet composition. The individual collages form an interconnected whole, but Hampl's artistic inventiveness makes each of them unique and unrepeatable. The colours of the collages are muted thanks to the raw materials used, and apart from white and black, red is usually used as a colour accent. During his scholarship in the United States in 1992, Josef Hampl collected printed and handwritten calligraphic posters in New York's Chinatown, from which he created an aesthetically and content-wise interesting set of collages in 1997, which reflect the bizarre atmosphere and energy of the place (Chinatown New York, 1997).

Hampl's collages, prints and drawings have always displayed a delicate tenderness and at the same time a rationality of constructivist tendencies close to a "new sensibility". He is one of the witnesses of the messianic role of art, which Vladimír Boudník came up with. He understood art as creative work, as an exploration of an entrusted field, a claim, a symbolic space, which he explored systematically to the last detail and in all its conceivable nuances.

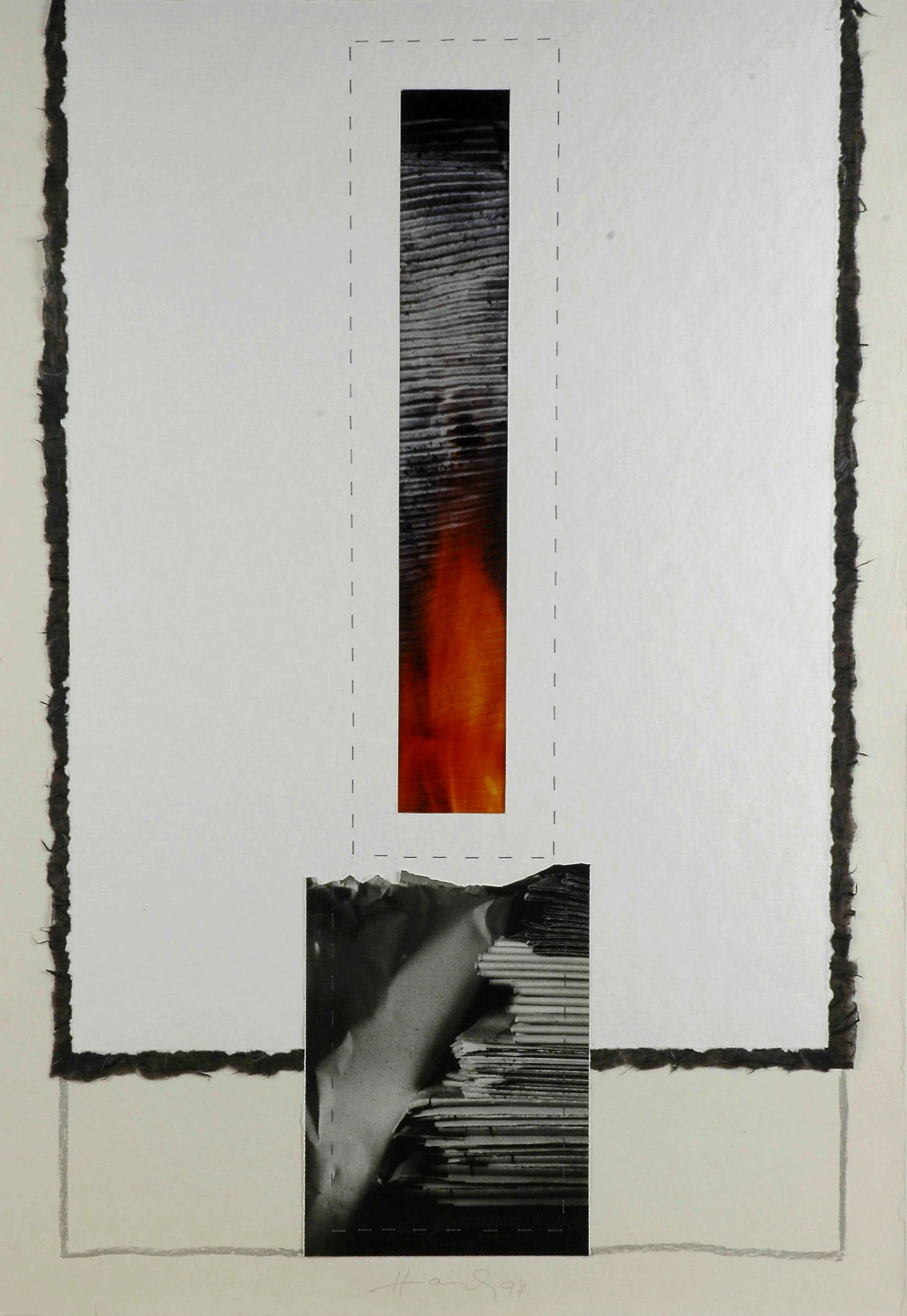
Landscape Probe III, photograph, cardboard, stapled collage, 1997

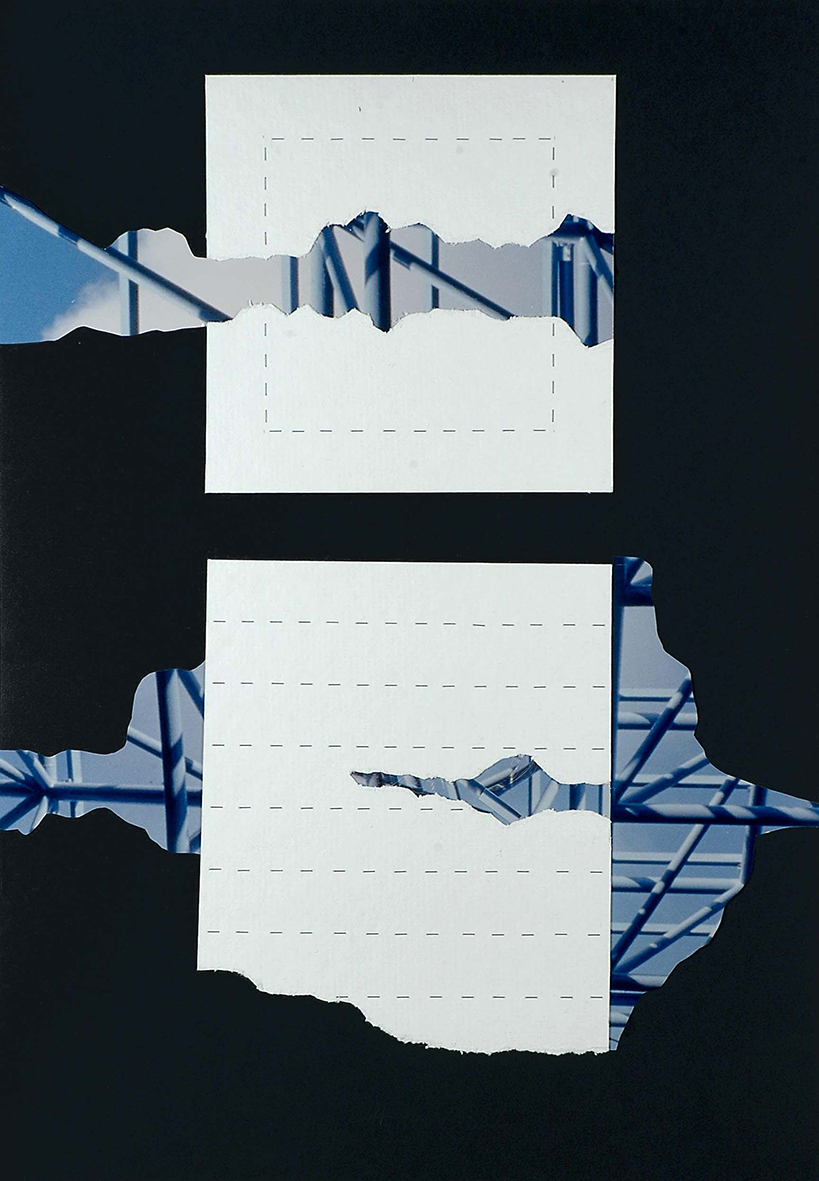
Untitled, stapled collage, 1998

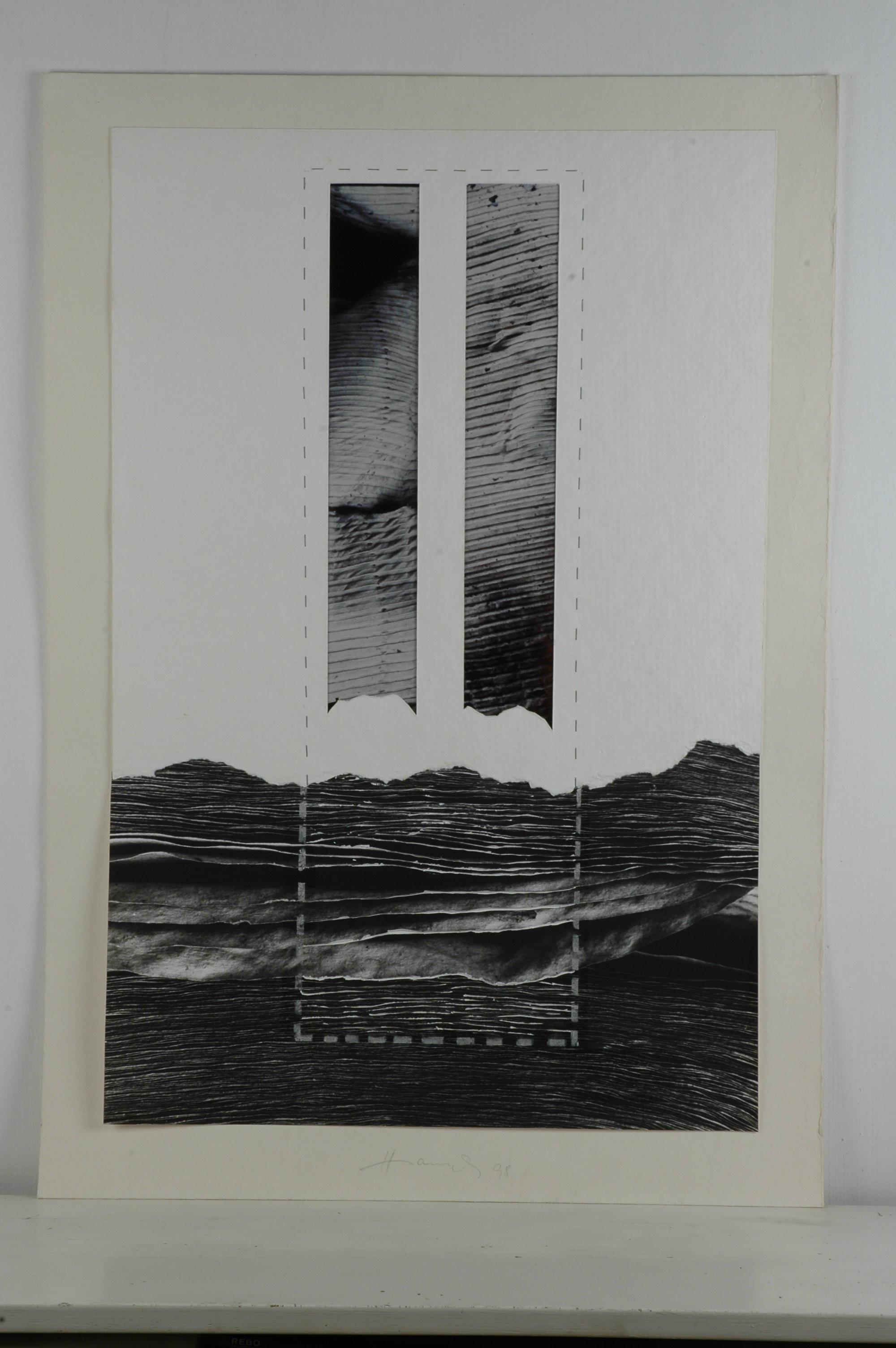
Landscape probe II, collage sewn with staples, 1998

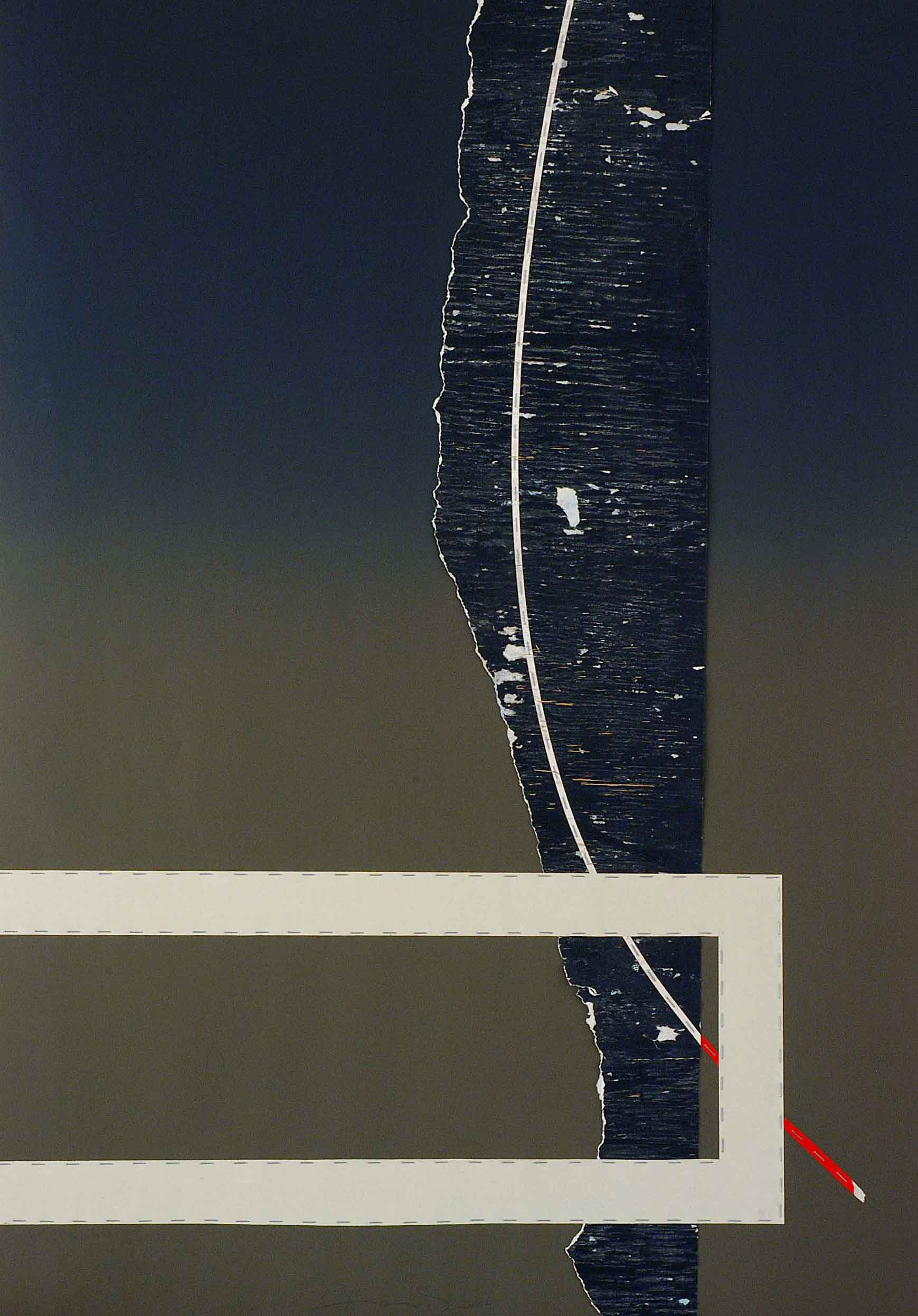
Finding, stapled collage, 2004

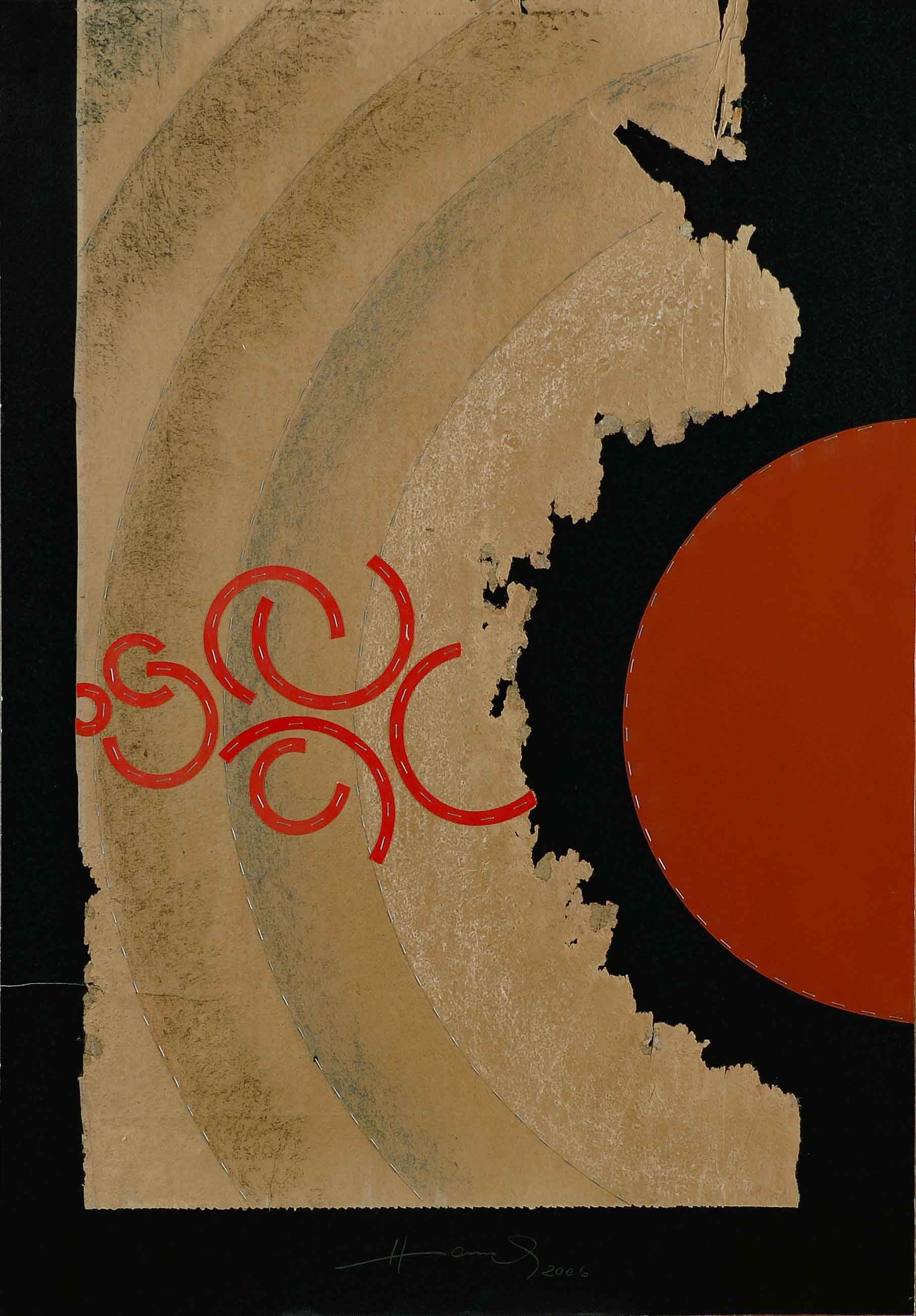
Confrontation IV, collage on cardboard sewn with staples, 2006

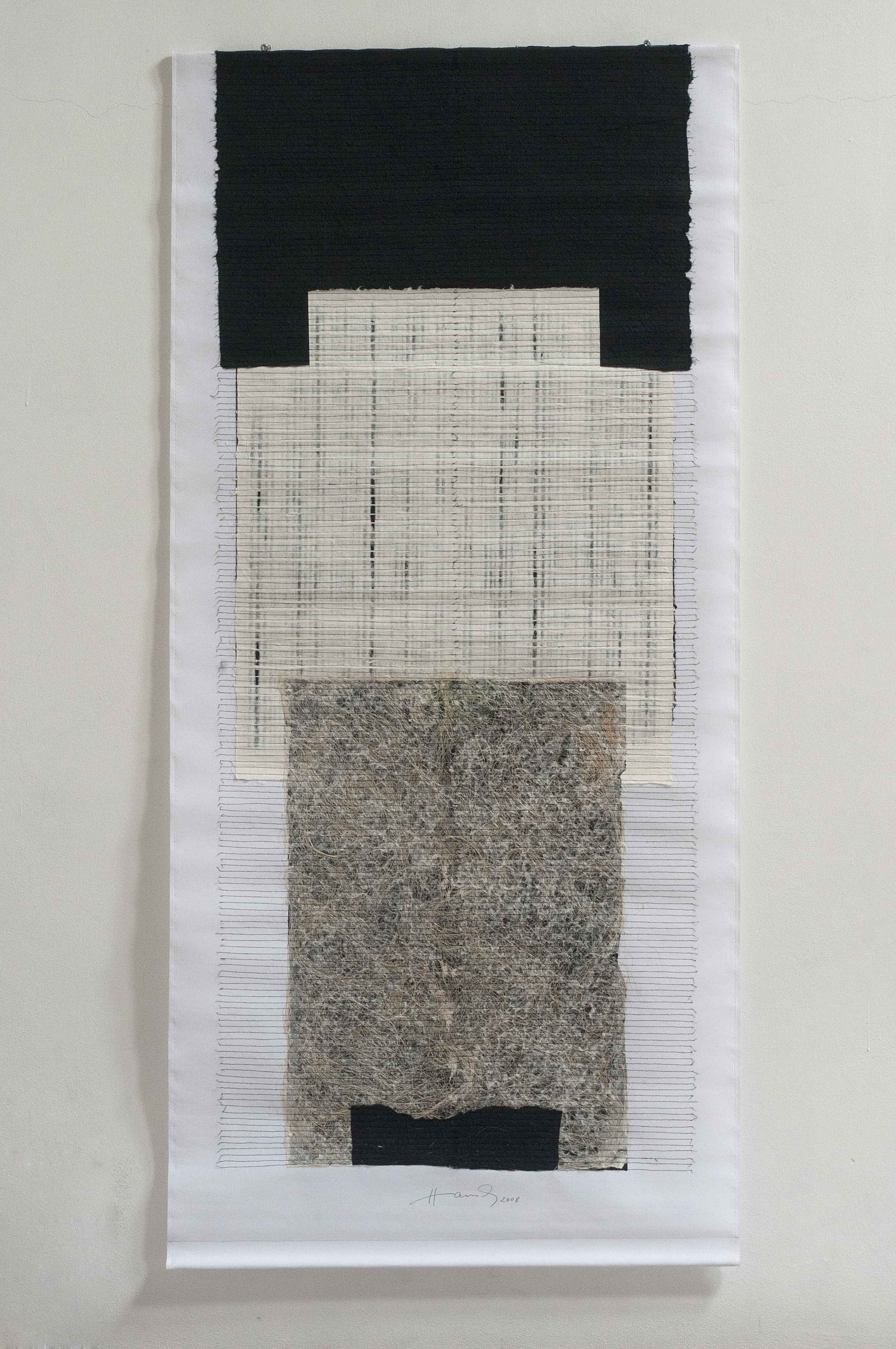
Untitled, sewn collage on canvas, 2008

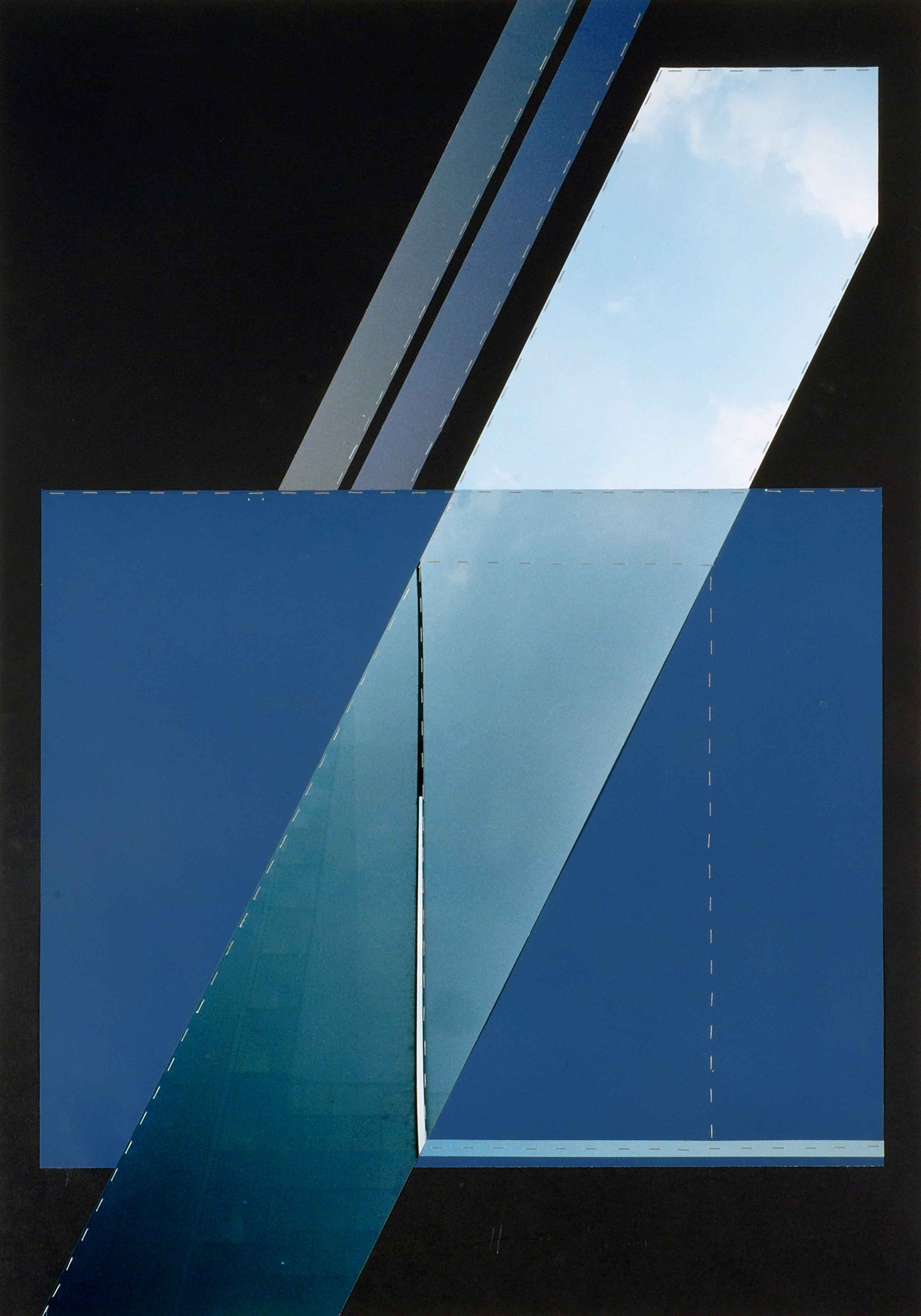
K III, stapled collage on cardboard, 2008

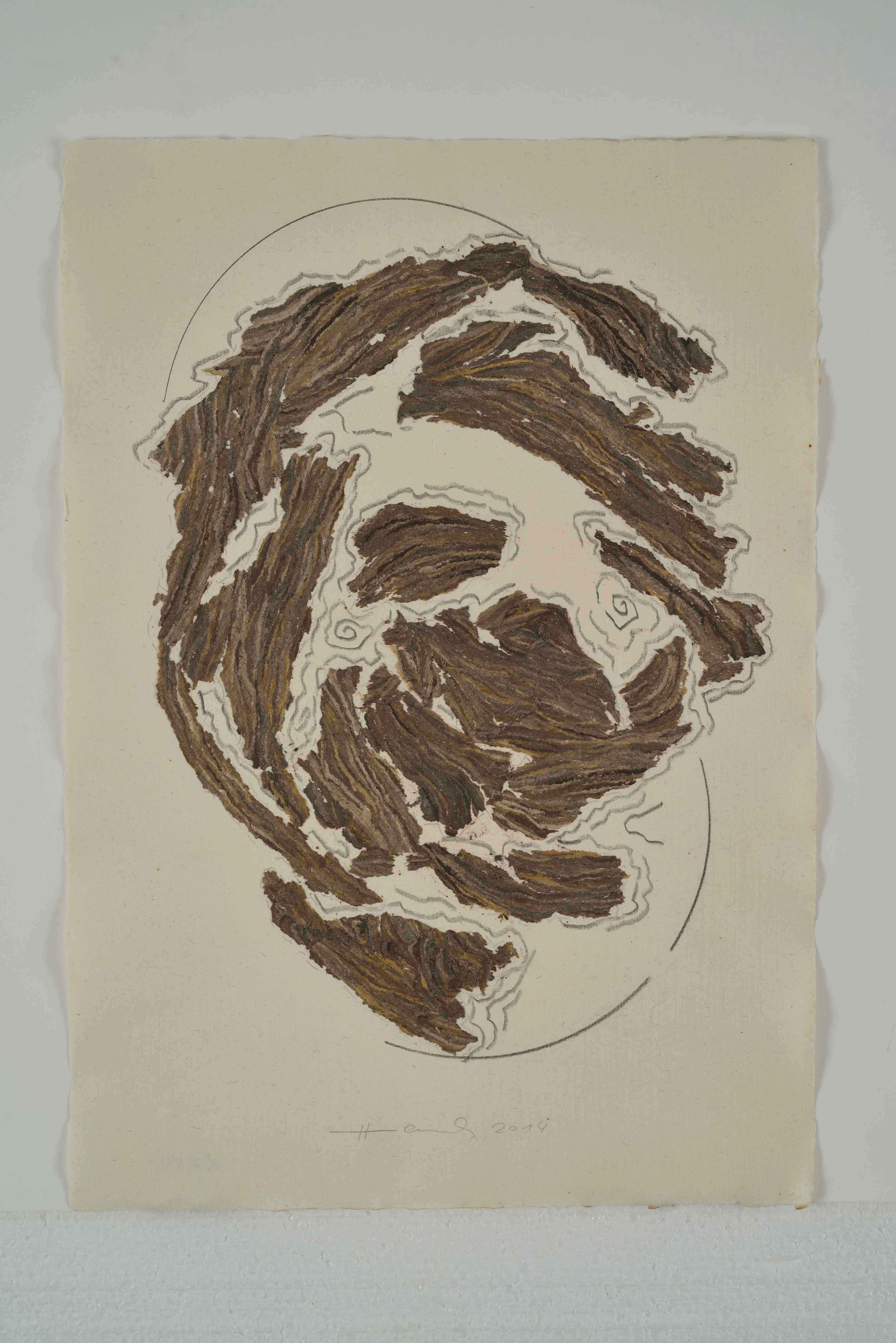
Guide to Wasp Nest XXVII, collage, 2014

=== Representation in collections ===
(Listed in: Josef Hampl, Šité kresby a koláže / Sewn drawings and collages, Gallery, Prague 2007, p. 9)

- National Gallery in Prague
- Centre Pompidou, Paris
- Art Gallery Karlovy Vary
- Ministry of Culture of the Czech Republic
- Moravian Gallery in Brno
- Graphiksammlung des XX. Jh., Deutscher Bundestag, Bonn
- Museum für aktuelle Kunst, Utrecht
- de Warande Culture Centre, Turnhout, Belgium
- Stedelijk Museum, Toroke
- Staatsgalerie, Stuttgart
- Museum Stucki, Lodz
- Pratt Graphics Centre, New York
- University of Michigan Museum of Art, Ann Arbor
- Gallery of Fine Arts in Ostrava
- Museum and Gallery, Hranice
- Kassák múzeum és archívum, Budapest
- State Jewish Museum, Prague
- Ostfonds für kulturelle Angelegenheiten des Bundesministeriums für Unterricht und Kunst, Wienna
- Kunstmuseum Bochum
- Collection of the Prague Gas Works

== Sources ==
=== Catalogues (selection) ===
- Josef Hampl: Graphics from 1959 to 1961, Tamchyna Petr, cat. 20 p., Závod Klementa Gottwalda, Vysočany, 1961
- Josef Hampl, text by Hartmann Antonín, cat. 44 p., Galerie Bode Glaub, Cologne, 1970
- Josef Hampl: Works with paper and drawing 1983–85, Pánková Marcela, cat. 2 p., Galerie Opatov 1986
- Josef Hampl: Drawings - Sewing 1982–1986, Pánková Marcela, cat. 24 p., Central Cultural House of Railway Workers, Prague, 1986
- Josef Hampl, text by Machalický Jiří, cat. 82 p., Gallery of Fine Arts in Most 1991
- Josef Hampl: Balance 1982–1992, Machalický Jiří, cat. 48 p., ČFVU Praha, 1993
- Josef Hampl: Sewn Collages, Hirsch Thomas et al., cat. 28 p., Gema Art Group, spol. s.r.o., Prague, 1996
- Confrontation V.: Josef Hampl, Fiedor Jiří, cat. 12 p., Polish Institute in Prague, 2006
- Josef Hampl, Machalický Jiří, cat. 16 p., Gallery, spol. s r.o. (Jaroslav Kořán), Prague, 2007
- Josef Hampl: Sewn Drawings, Adriana Primusová, cat. 4 p., GASK Kutná Hora, 2017
- Josef Hampl: Selected Works 1959–2016, text by Martina Vítková, cat. 110 p., Museum Kampa, Prague, 2017

=== Publications ===
- Hynek Glos, Petr Vizina, Stará garda (The Old Guard), published by. Argo, Prague 2016, pp. 66–71, ISBN 978-80-257-1881-0
- Jindřich Štreit (ed.), Sovinec 1986/88, OKS Bruntál 1989
- Jiří Machalický, Vladislav Merhaut, Vladimír Boudník's Vysočany Circle, National Gallery in Prague 1992, ISBN 80-7035-043-1
