= John Hempel =

American mathematician and topologist (1935–2022)

- Born: October 14, 1935; Salt Lake City, Utah
- Died: January 13, 2022 (aged 86); St. Petersburg, Florida
- Education: University of Utah; University of Wisconsin-Madison
- Spouse: Edith Hempel
- Scientific career
- Fields: Mathematics
- Workplaces: Rice University
- Thesis: A surface in S^{3} is tame if it can be deformed into each complementary domain (1962)
- Doctoral advisor: R. H. Bing

John Paul Hempel (October 14, 1935 – January 13, 2022) was an American mathematician specialising in geometric topology.

== Early life and career ==
Hempel was born in Salt Lake City, Utah. In 1957 he graduated from the University of Utah with a degree in mathematics. In 1962, he defended his thesis at the University of Wisconsin-Madison, under the supervision of R. H. Bing. He was a professor at Rice University until the time of his death.

In 2013, Hempel was elected a fellow of the American Mathematical Society.

== Research ==
He also introduced the study of the curve complex into 3-manifold topology.

Hempel wrote a book about 3-manifolds in 1976.

== Personal life ==
He was married to Edith, whom he married on September 1, 1965, in Houston, Texas; they had one son.
