= Statue of Saint Wenceslas, Prague =

State of Saint Wenceslas, Prague may refer to:

- Statue of Saint Wenceslas (Bendl), Vyšehrad
- Statue of Saint Wenceslas, Wenceslas Square
