= Hotel Jalta =

Hotel in Prague that was hides a nuclear bunker

Coordinates: 50.0811°N 14.4284°E

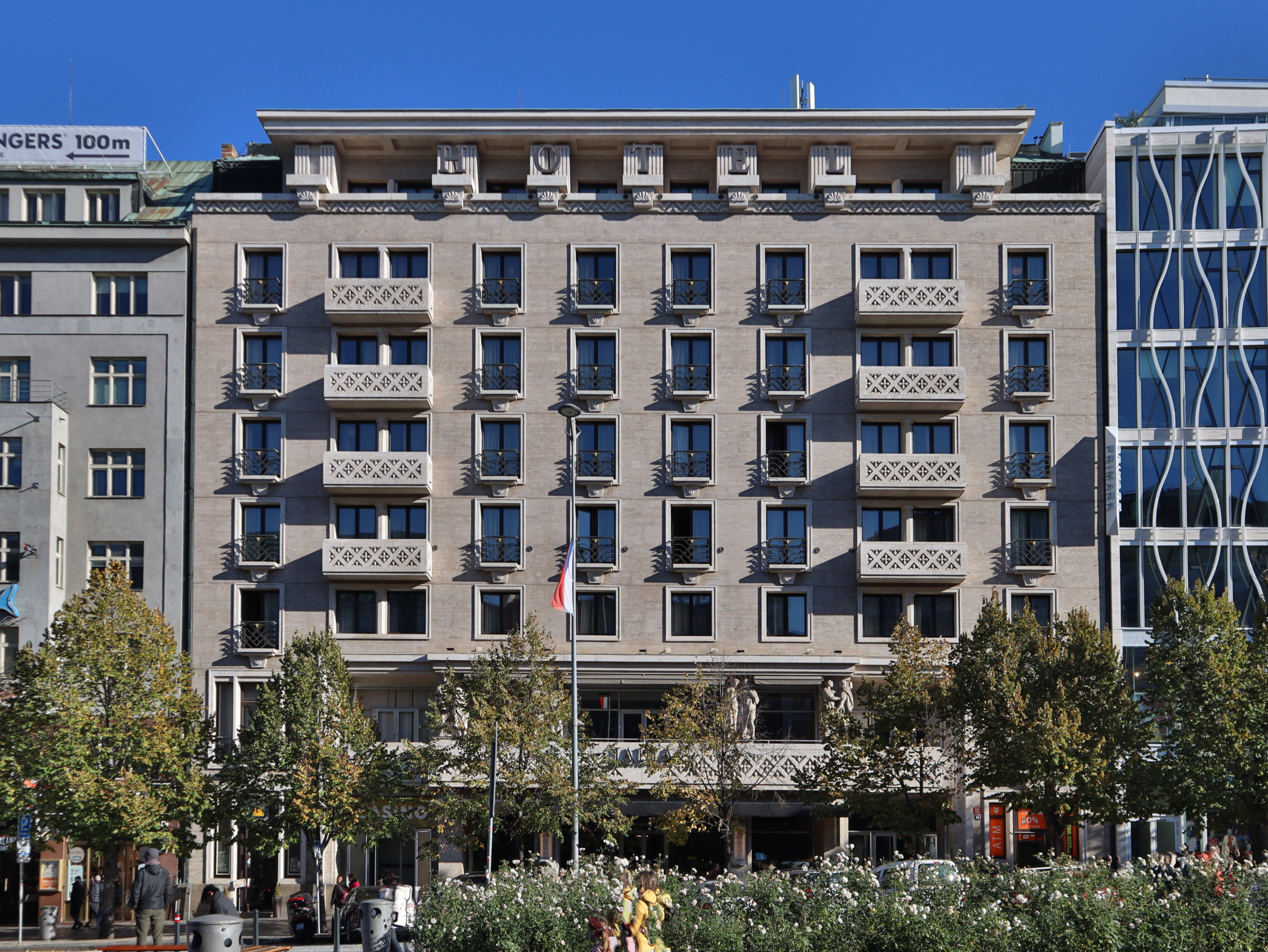
Hotel Jalta building in Prague

The Hotel Jalta is a hotel on Wenceslas Square in Prague that was hides a nuclear bunker constructed by the communist government. The hotel was constructed in 1954. The hotel building above the bunker was decorated in the socialist realism style. The bunker was discovered in 1989 with the collapse of communism. The building has been designated as a cultural monument of the Czech Republic.
