= Miloš Kurovský =

- Born: 18 October 1924; Ostrava, Czechoslovakia
- Died: 22 October 2017 (aged 93); Prague, Czech Republic
- Known for: Painter
- Website: kurovsky.cz

Miloš Kurovský (18 October 1924 – 22 October 2017) was a Czech visual artist, painter and illustrator. He is known for his unique artistic technique and specific work, which is carried in the spirit of fantasy-tuned ideas about the mysteries of the cosmos. He is best known for Galerie za oknem ('gallery behind the window') at Hradčany in Prague.

== Life and work ==
Kurovský was born on 18 October 1924 in Ostrava. In his youth, he was strongly influenced by the philosophy of Immanuel Kant, Georg Hegel, Friedrich Nietzsche, Arthur Schopenhauer and others, which was reflected in the subjects of his artistic work.

After World War II, Kurovský moved to Prague, where he worked in fashion design, photography and art. In 1964, he founded the International Association of Artists and Writers in Dubrovnik, registered under UNESCO, of which he was the chairman. In the second half of the 1960s, he regularly exhibited as one of the first "under the open sky" in the Franciscan Garden, at the National Theatre and on the Charles Bridge in Prague.

In the 1970s, he discovered a new, unique technique – a combination of pastel, velor and a special binder, which enabled him to achieve a deep matte in his paintings, which does not have a disturbing effect even in strong lighting. In the mid-1970s, he opened an art gallery in Panská Street, where both his friends, especially musicians, and the general public met.

In the 1970s and 1980s, his friends and supporters organized a number of unofficial exhibitions abroad, e.g. in Germany, Italy, the United States, New Zealand. Official exhibitions took place in Stockholm and West Berlin. His unusual initiatives did not meet with the understanding of the Czech authorities.

He had his first official exhibition in the Czech Republic only in October 1993. At home, the public could get to know his work in the Galerie za oknem ('gallery behind the window') in Prague-Hradčany, where the author moved in 1978. Articles about this extremely impressive and unique gallery appeared in foreign newspapers, magazines and tourist guides.

Kurovský's work contains elements of science fiction, symbolism, religiosity and irrealism. In the words of the author: "Irrealism is an abstract idea, but it has a certain logic, it is real in the unreal". In contrast to surrealism – a surreal image is created in the subconscious, is not controlled by reason, lacks logic, is anomalous, sometimes even shocking.

== Exhibitions (selection) ==
- 1966 Small spring exhibition of paintings by Miloš Kurovský, Franciscan Garden, Prague
- 1993 Institute of Macromolecular Chemistry, Prague
- 1999 Pictures from the new millennium, exhibition hall of the SKKS Chomutov, Chomutov
- 1999 Police Museum of the Czech Republic, Prague
- 2006 VZP CR 2014 Painter from the New World, Prague
- 2014 Kávovarna (passage Lucerna), Prague
- 2015 Lurago gallery, Chomutov
- 2016 The Imaginary World of Miloš Kurovského, Knihkupectví, kavárna a galerie Řehoře Samsy, Prague
- 2016 Paintings by Miloš Kurovský, Karlovy Vary
- 2017 Miloš Kurovský – Window of the New World, Malšice, Želeč
- 2019 Miloš Kurovský, Galerie U Radnice, Tábor
- 2021 Prague, Karlín Studios
- 2022 Demons at Faust, Faust's house, Prague
- 2024 Exclusive exhibition on the 100th anniversary of the birth of Miloš Kurovský, Jindřišská věž, Prague
- 2025 Painter from the New World, Prague

== Gallery ==
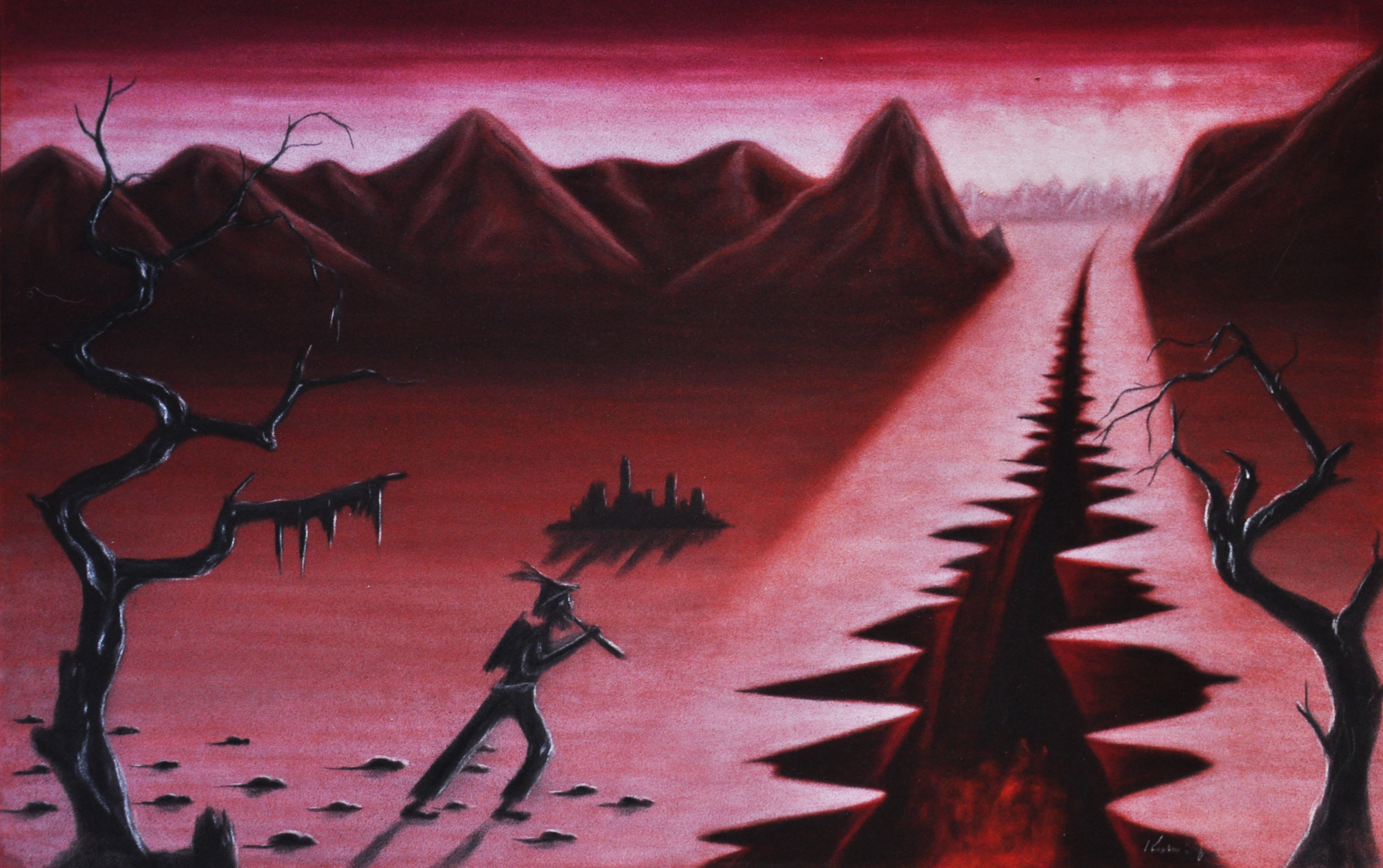
The Rat-Catcher

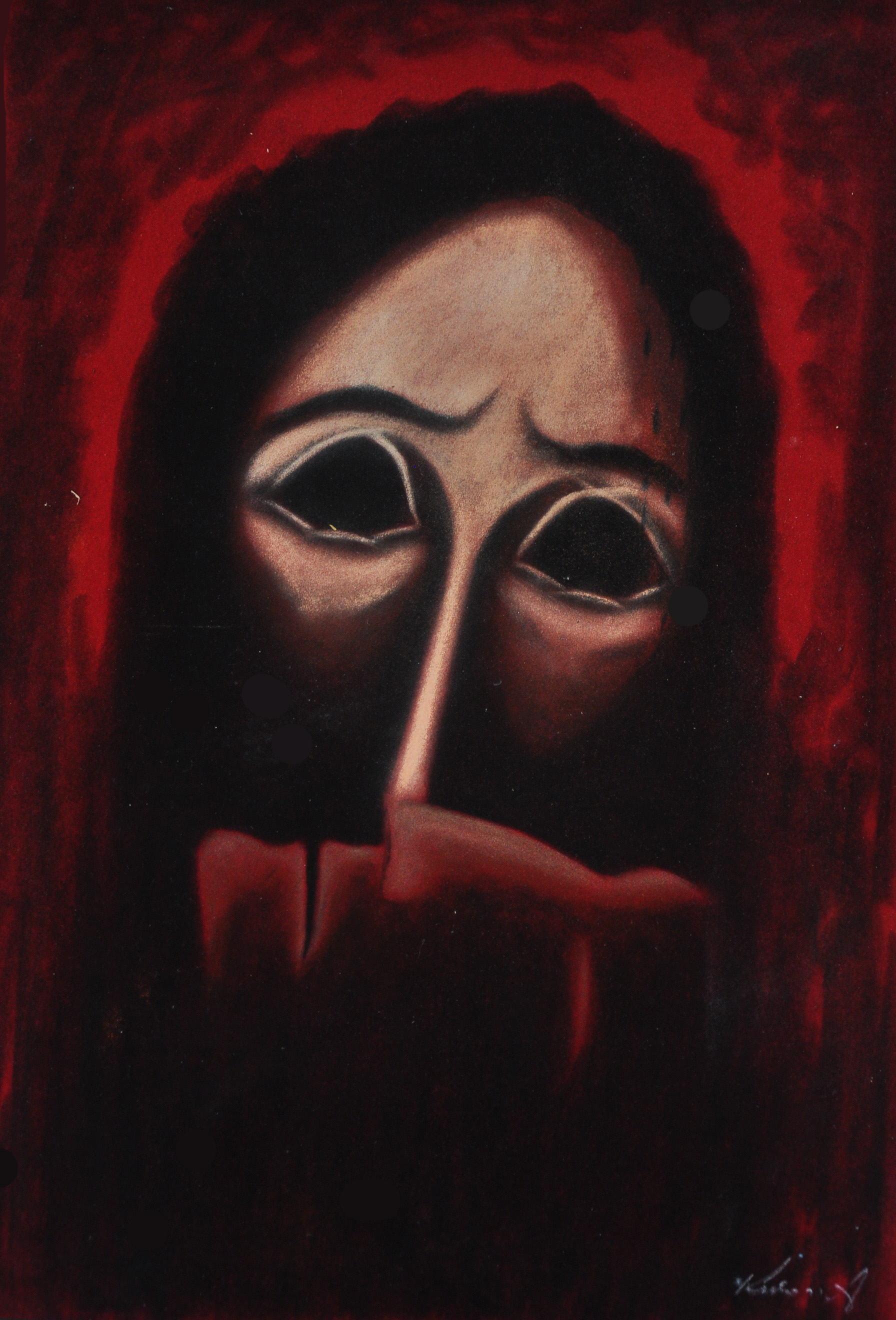
Executioner's Conscience

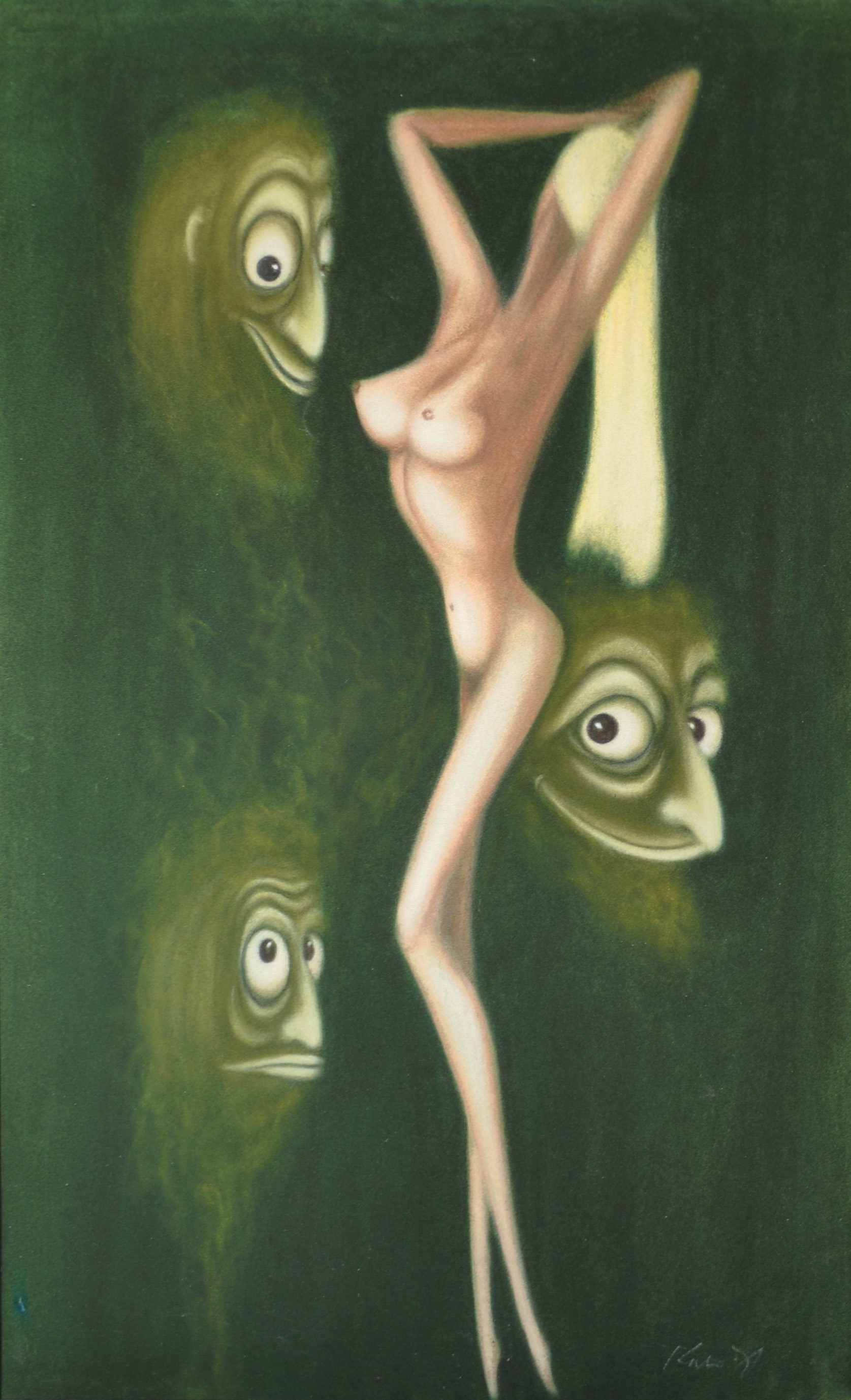
Susanna in the Bath

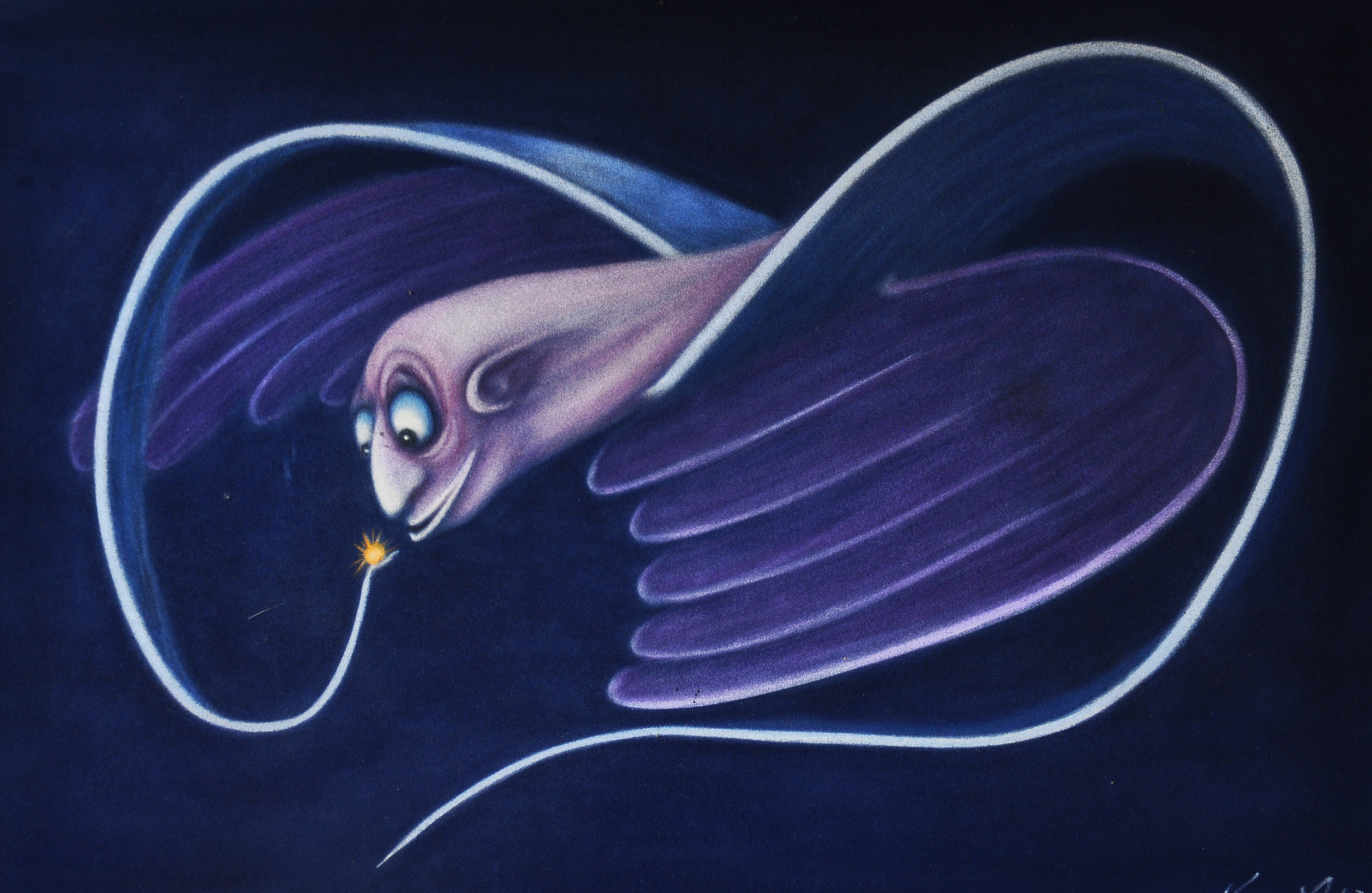
A Star Is Born

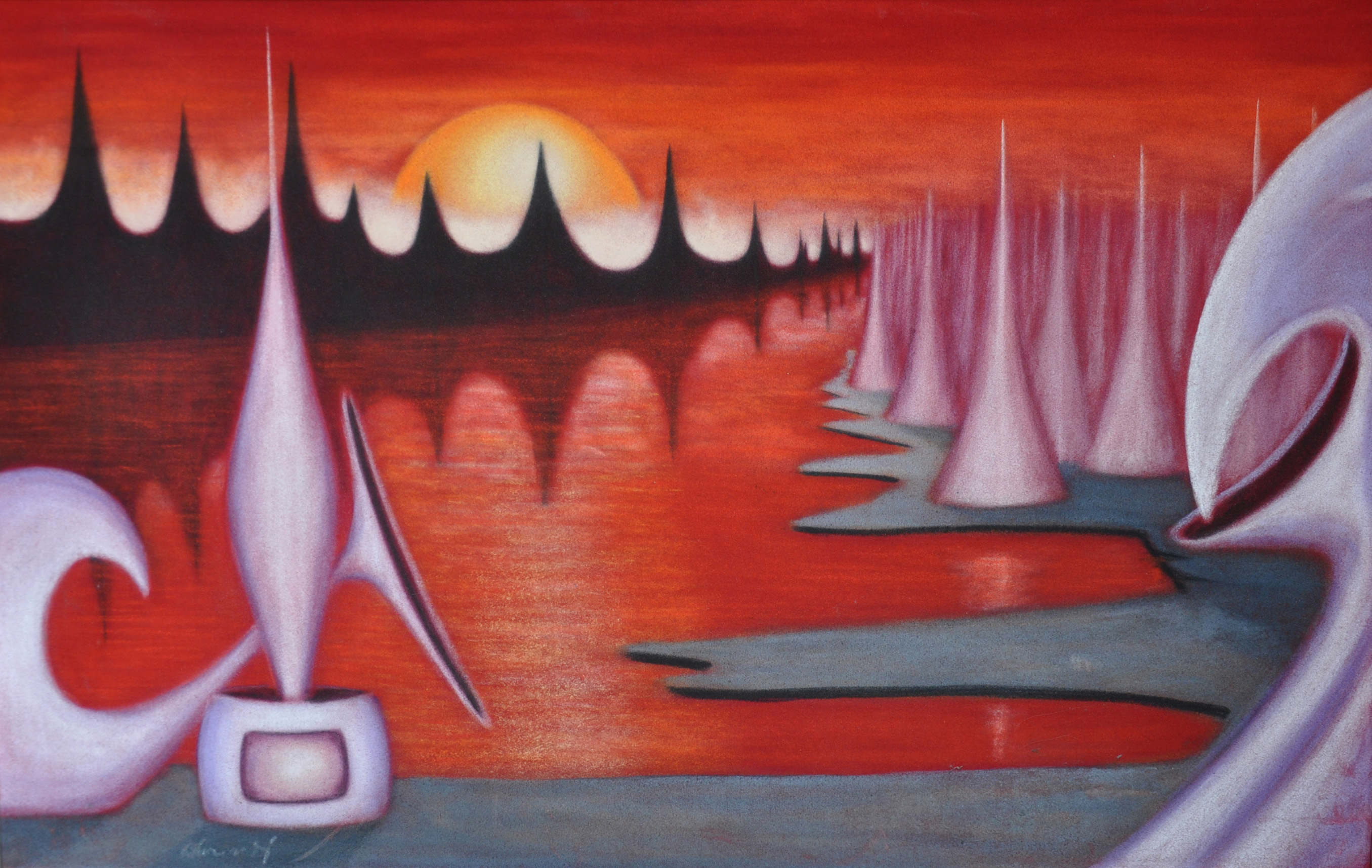
Lunar landscape on Maratas

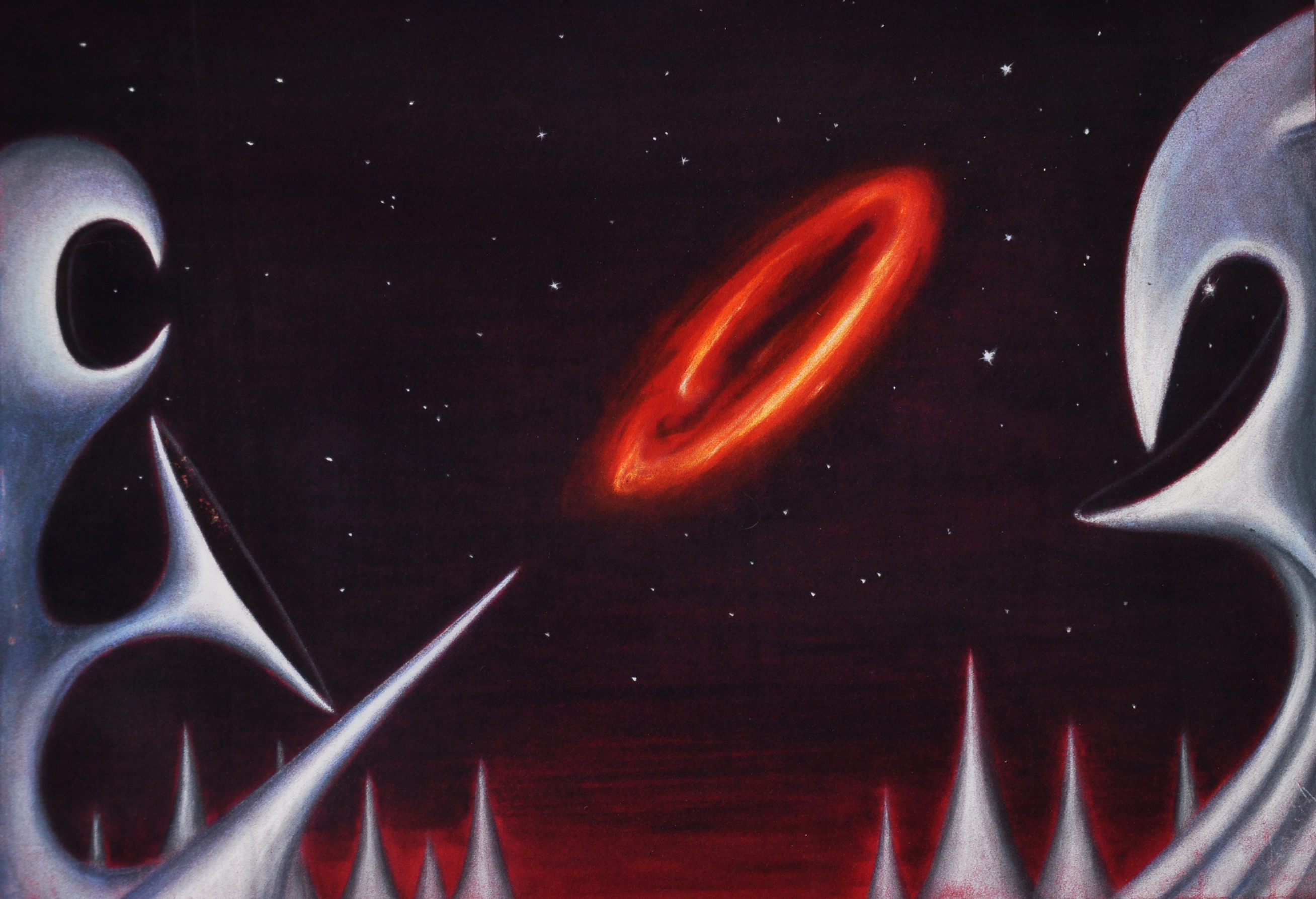
Out of galaxy

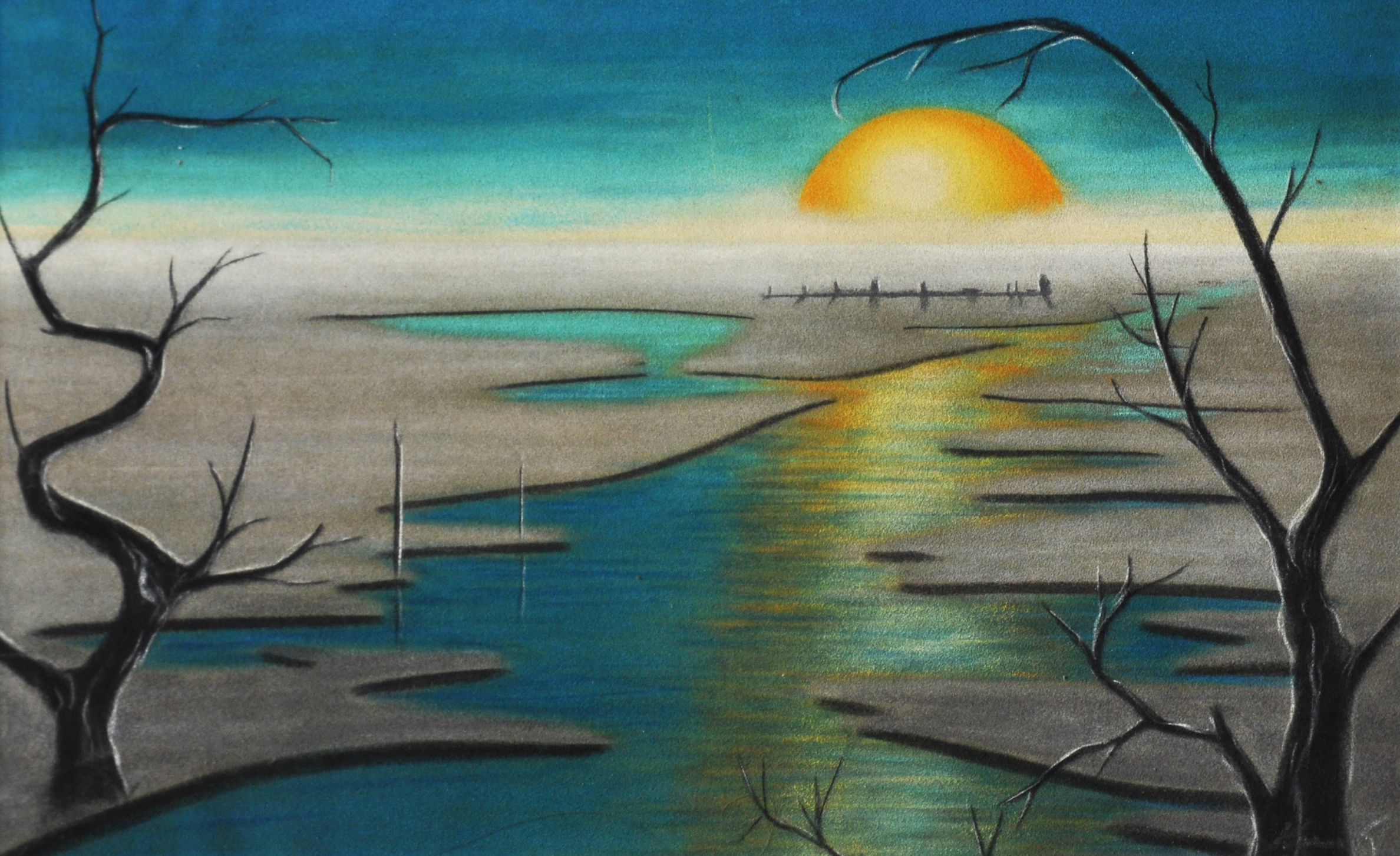
Apocalypsy

Sunset
