= Franciscan Garden, Prague =

Historic park in the Czech Republic

Franciscan Garden
- Františkánská zahrada
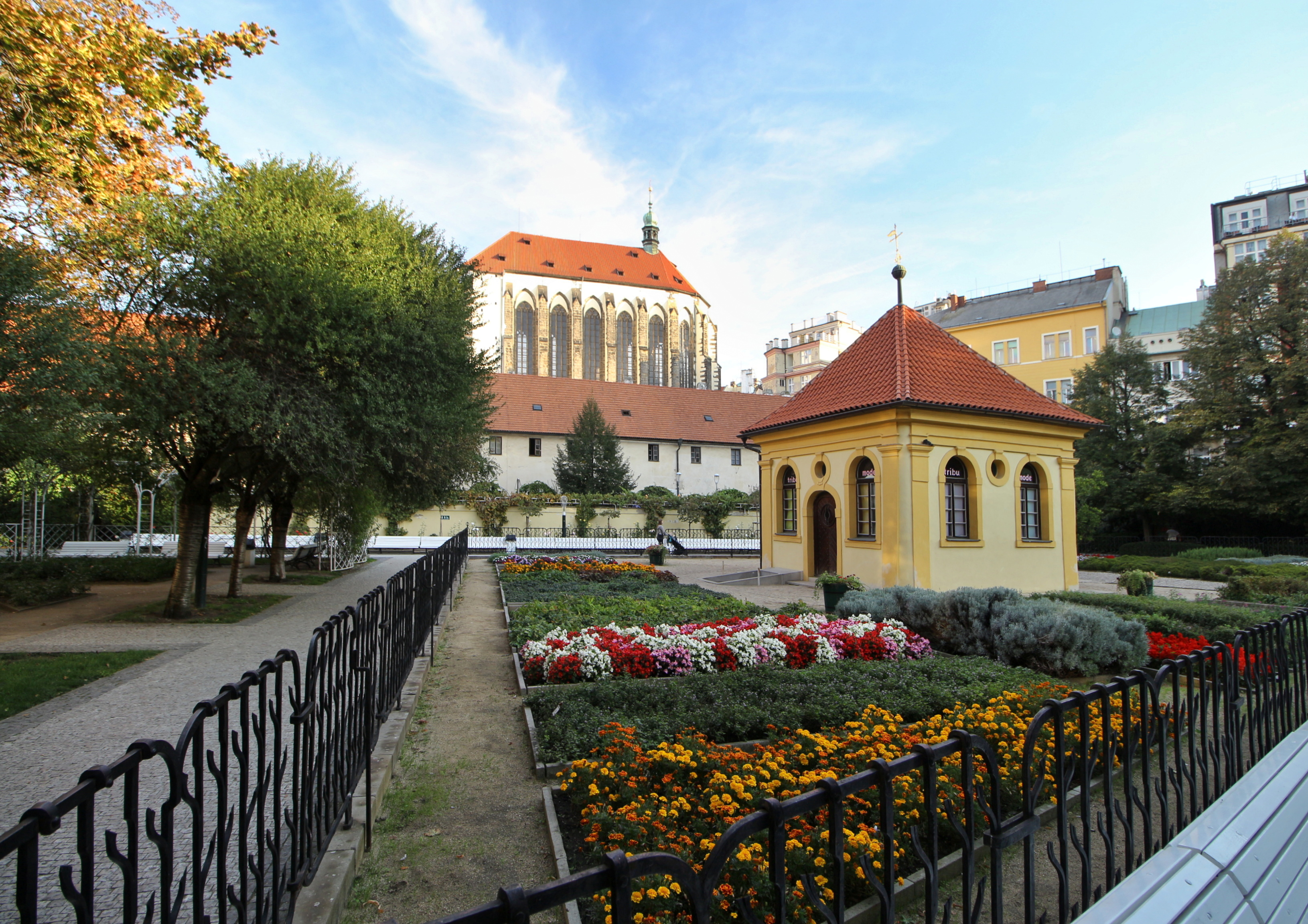
- Pavilion in the centre of the park
- Interactive map of Franciscan Garden
- Type: City park
- Location: New Town, Prague, Czech Republic
- Coordinates: 50°4′56″N 14°25′25″E
- Area: 190 x 190 m²
- Etymology: Named after Order of Friars Minor
- Owner: Prague 1
- Open: Year-round, closed at night
- Public transit: Můstek

The Franciscan Garden (Czech: Františkánská zahrada) is a historic park in New Town district of Prague in the Czech Republic. Originally known as the Carmelite Garden of Our Lady of the Snows, it was created during the founding of the New Town in 1348 under the reign of Charles IV as King of Bohemia. It was known as the Franciscan Garden by 1604 when the monastery, originally Carmelite, became property of the Order of the Discalced Franciscans.

Later, following the expulsion and internment of the Franciscans by the ruling communist party, it was opened to the public in 1950. While the monastery itself was returned, the gardens have since been owned by the municipal district of Prague 1 (except for a small, private section returned to the Franciscans), open year-round but closed at night. The garden has also been restored multiple times over the centuries - most recently, between 1989 and 1992, using designs from architect Josef Kuča and incorporating sculptures from Czech academic sculptors Stanislav Hanzík and Josef Klimeš.

== Description ==
Open year-round (but closed at night), the garden can be accessed by the public from Vodičkova street (via the Světozor passage), Wenceslas Square (via the Alfa passage), Palackého Street, and Jungmannova Street.

The main layout of the garden follows its early Baroque ground plan, a cruciform (cross-shaped) axis, aligned with the Church of Our Lady of the Snows. At the garden's centre is a Baroque pavilion (now a shop), around which is a herb garden, enclosed by a wrought-iron fence.

The rest of the garden is planted with hedges and rose bushes on metal arches, overlooking benches. Since a restoration was conducted in the 1990s, the garden also contains sculptures from Czech academic sculptors, Stanislav Hanzík (Boy with a shell) and Josef Klimeš (Spring Nymphs and Fairies, featuring a drinking fountain).

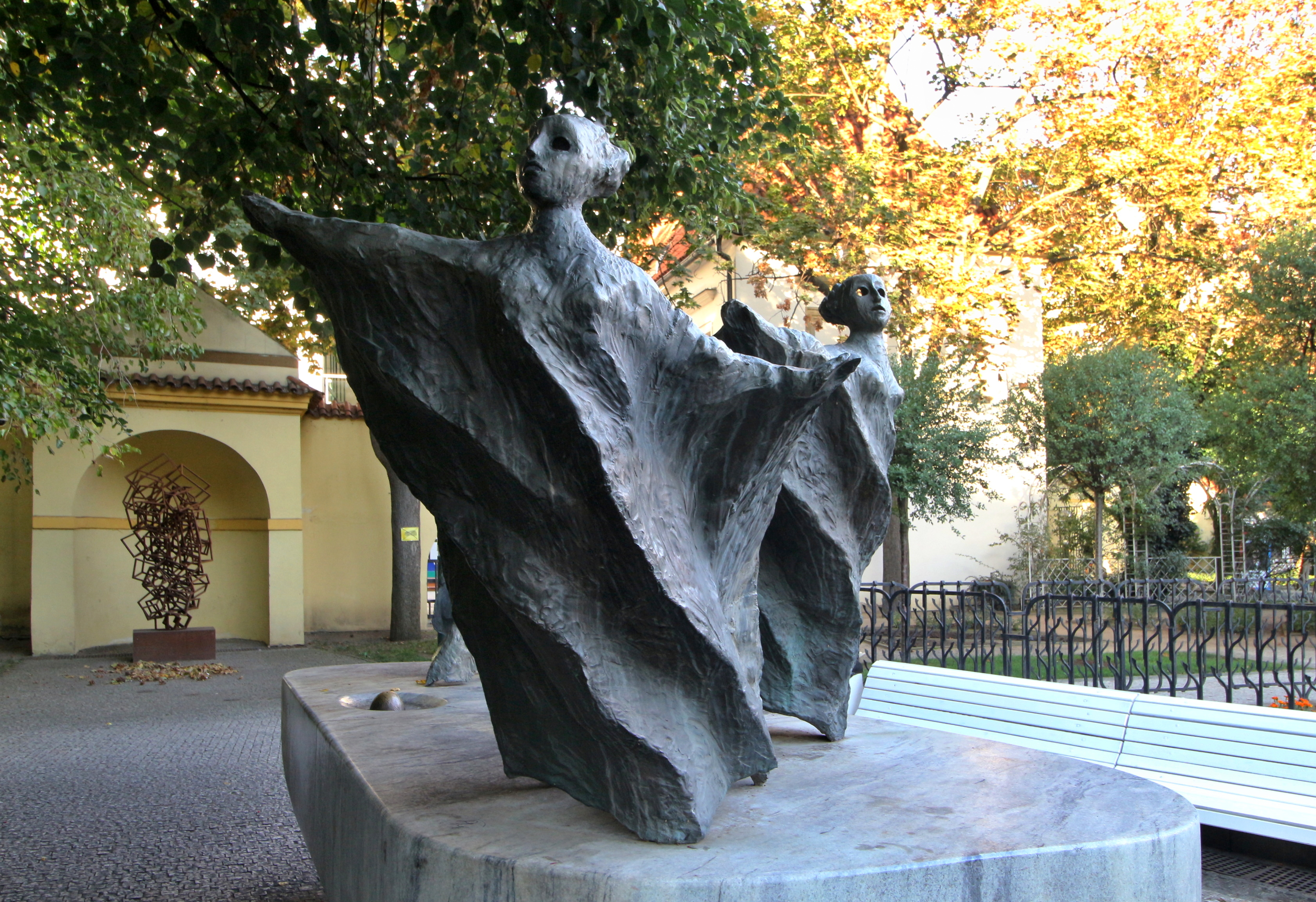
Josef Klimeš' Spring Nymphs and Fairies sculpture

A small section of the park is walled off and reserved for the Friars of the Order of Friars Minor, inhabiting the nearby monastery. In addition, there is a children's playground, separated from the rest of the garden by a wall and with areas for younger children and older children.

== History ==
=== 14th–19th centuries ===
Known then as the Carmelite Garden of Our Lady of the Snows, the garden was opened in 1348 during the founding of Prague's New Town. This followed the establishment of the Church of Our Lady of the Snows to commemorate the coronation of Charles IV and Blanche of Valois in 1347. However, as a result of the Hussite wars in the 15th century, construction of the church was interrupted and the friars abandoned the monastery complex (including the garden), which fell into disrepair.

The ruined monastery was later settled by Franciscan Friars in 1604, who formally received it from Emperor Rudolph II under a charter issued in 1606. It was from this time that the garden became known as the Franciscan Garden (Czech: Františkánská zahrada). Under both the Carmelites and the Franciscans, the gardens were used to grow food, (including herbs, fruits, vegetables, and spices) but also to grow ornamental plants to decorate altars. In later years, the garden underwent numerous renovations and, in the 18th century, a Baroque garden pavilion, a summer refectory, and a pharmacy were added.

=== 20th century ===
During World War II, under the military occupation of Czechoslovakia by Nazi Germany, two fire water storage tanks were built, disturbing the historical layout of the garden. These tanks were filled up only between 1980 and 1985.

In 1950, the garden was opened to the public (but principally used as a passage), following the expulsion of the Franciscan Friars (some of whom sent to prisons and others to internment camps) after the Communist Party of Czechoslovakia came to power.

After the Velvet Revolution, which saw the fall of communism in Czechoslovakia in 1989, the monastery was returned to the Catholic Church and a small, private section of the garden was reserved for the Franciscans. The majority of the garden is now the property of the Prague 1 Municipal District.

Since then, between 1989 and 1992, the garden was reconstructed using designs from the Czech architect Josef Kuča and preserving its historical layout. This reconstruction included sculptures from academic sculptors Stanislava Hanzík and Josef Klimeš. It was followed by the addition of a wrought iron gate, designed by Petr Císařovský, depicting 24 scenes from the life of Saint Francis of Assisi.

== Gallery ==
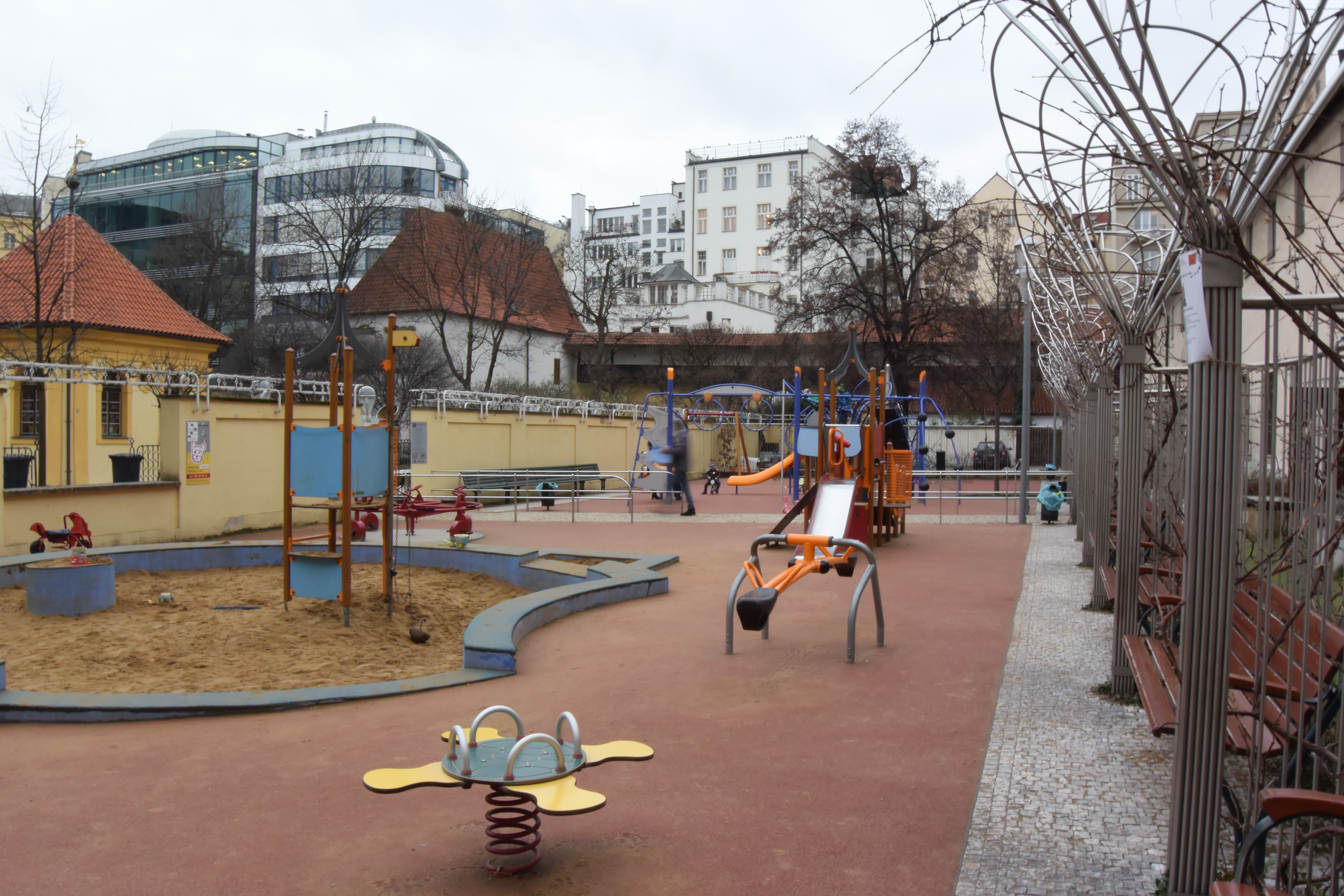
Playground adjacent to the park

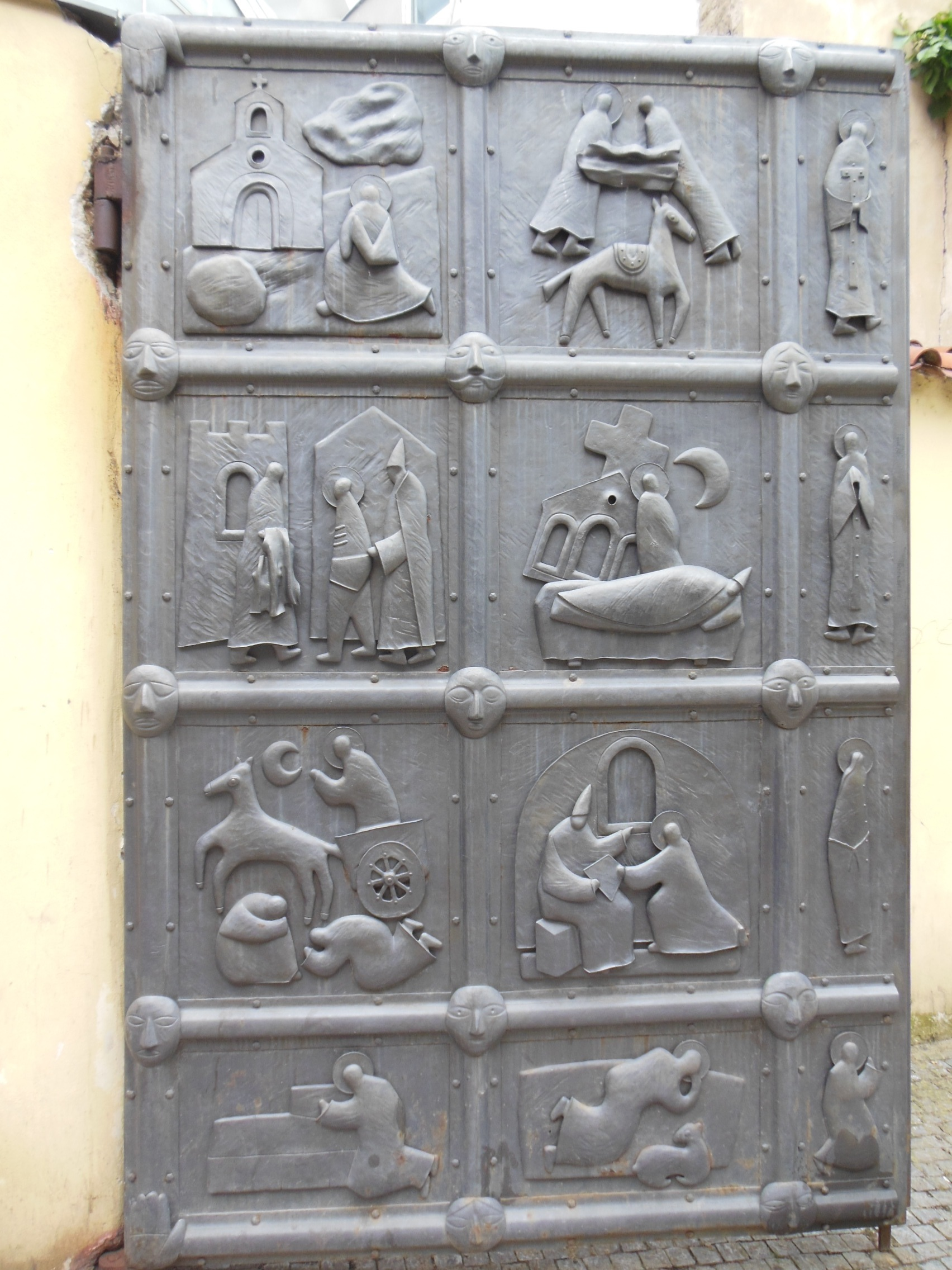
Metal gate to the park from Alfa Passage depicting scenes from the life of St Francis of Assisi

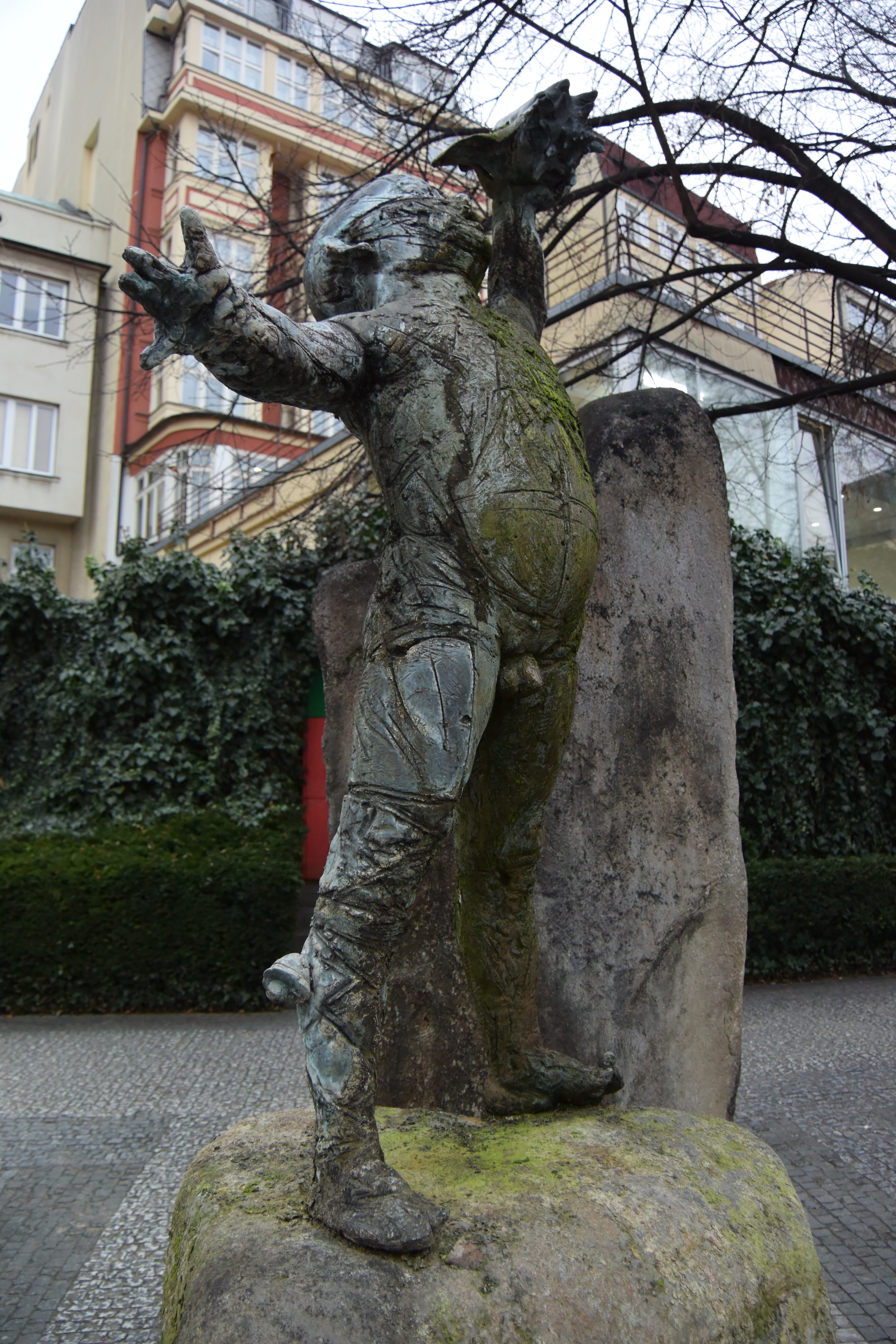
Boy with a shell, sculpture by Stanislav Hanzík

The garden and the Church of Our Lady of the Snows, between 1890 and 1921
