= Statue of Saint Wenceslas (Bendl) =

Statue in Prague, Czech Republic

- Socha svatého Václava (Czech)
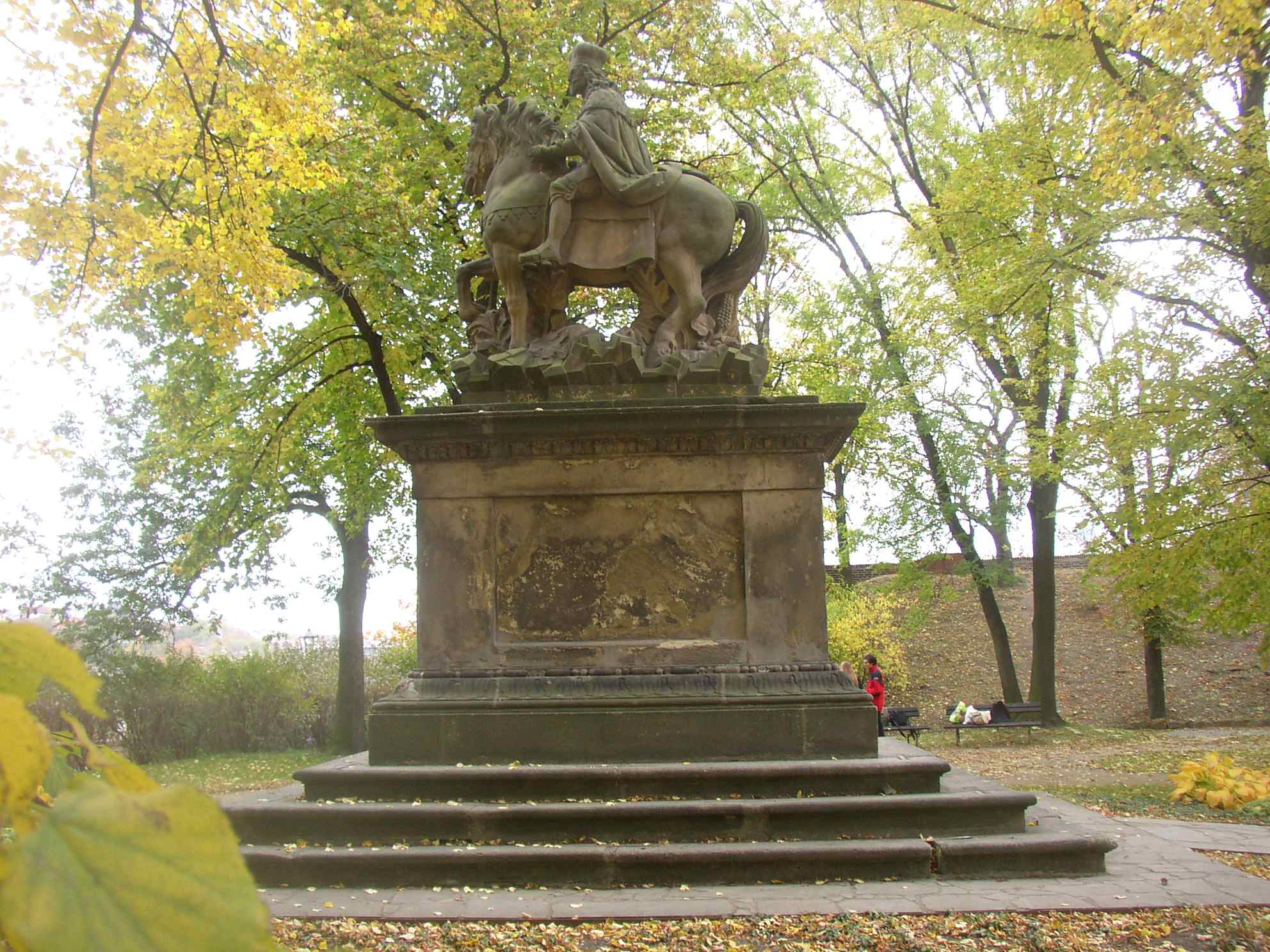
- The sculpture in 2005
- Type: sculpture
- Medium: sandstone
- Location: Prague, Czech Republic; 50°03′56″N 14°25′02″E

The statue of Saint Wenceslas (Czech: Socha svatého Václava) is an outdoor sculpture by Johann-Georg Bendl from 1680, installed at Vyšehrad, Prague, Czech Republic. The statue formerly stood in the middle of Wenceslas Square, near Grandhotel Evropa, but was moved to Vyšehrad in 1879.
