= Statue of Saint Wenceslas, Wenceslas Square =

Sculpture by Josef Václav Myslbek in Prague, Czech Republic

Statue of Saint Wenceslas
- Socha svatého Václava (Czech)
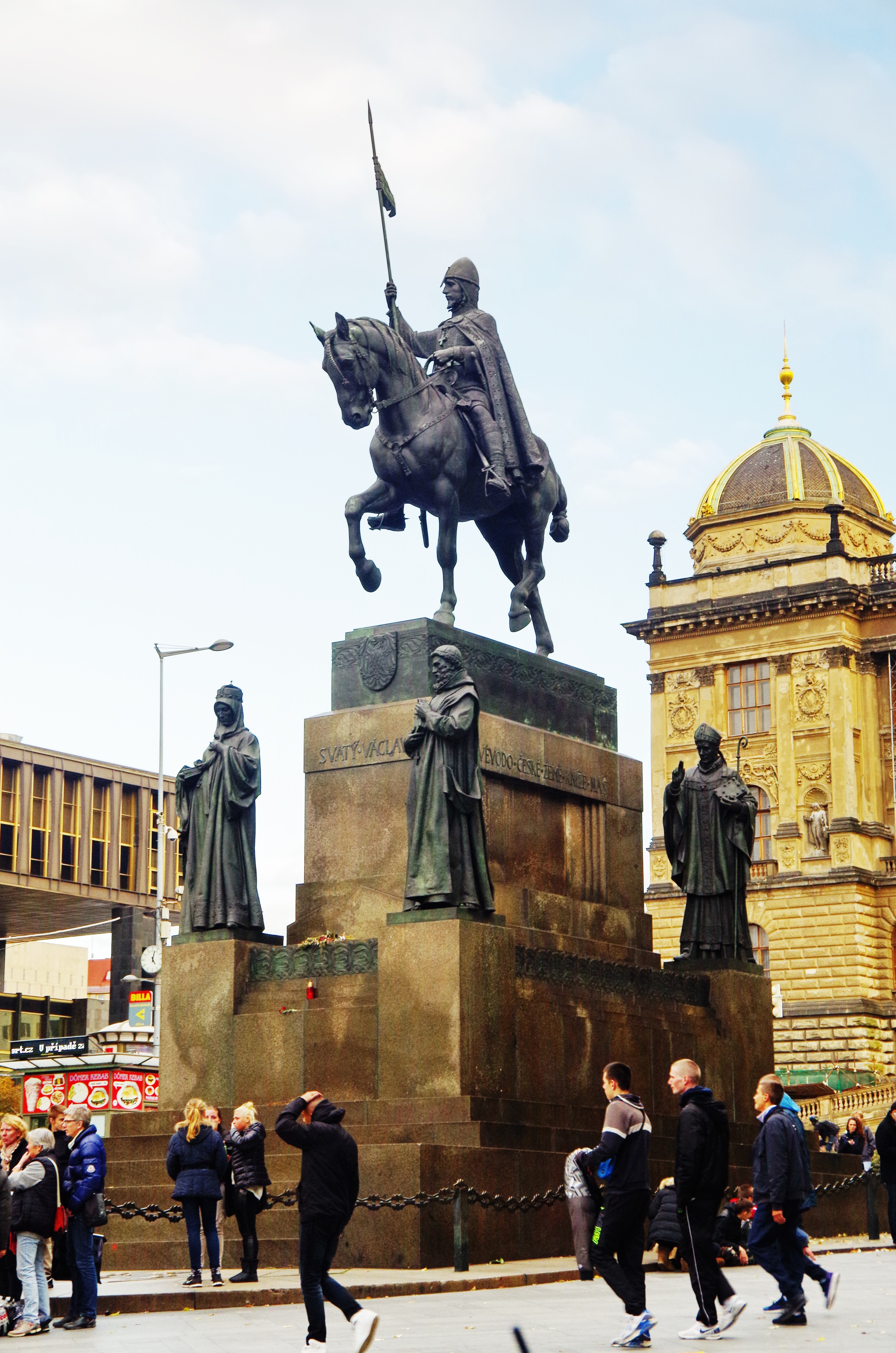
- The statue in 2013
- Artist: Josef Václav Myslbek
- Type: Sculpture
- Location: Prague, Czech Republic; 50.0797°N 14.4298°E
- Website: www.prague.eu/en/object/places/1878/statue-of-st-wenceslas

The statue of Saint Wenceslas (Czech: Socha svatého Václava) in Prague, Czech Republic depicts Wenceslaus I, Duke of Bohemia. It is installed at Wenceslas Square.

== Description ==
The mounted saint was sculpted by Josef Václav Myslbek in 1887–1924, and the image of Wenceslas is accompanied by other Czech patron saints carved into the ornate statue base: Saint Ludmila, Saint Agnes of Bohemia, Saint Prokop, and Saint Adalbert of Prague. The statue base, designed by architect Alois Dryák, includes the inscription: "Svatý Václave, vévodo české země, kníže náš, nedej zahynouti nám ni budoucím" (English: "Saint Wenceslas, duke of the Czech land, prince of ours, do not let perish us nor our descendants").
