= Stanislav Hanzík =

Czech sculptor (1931–2021)

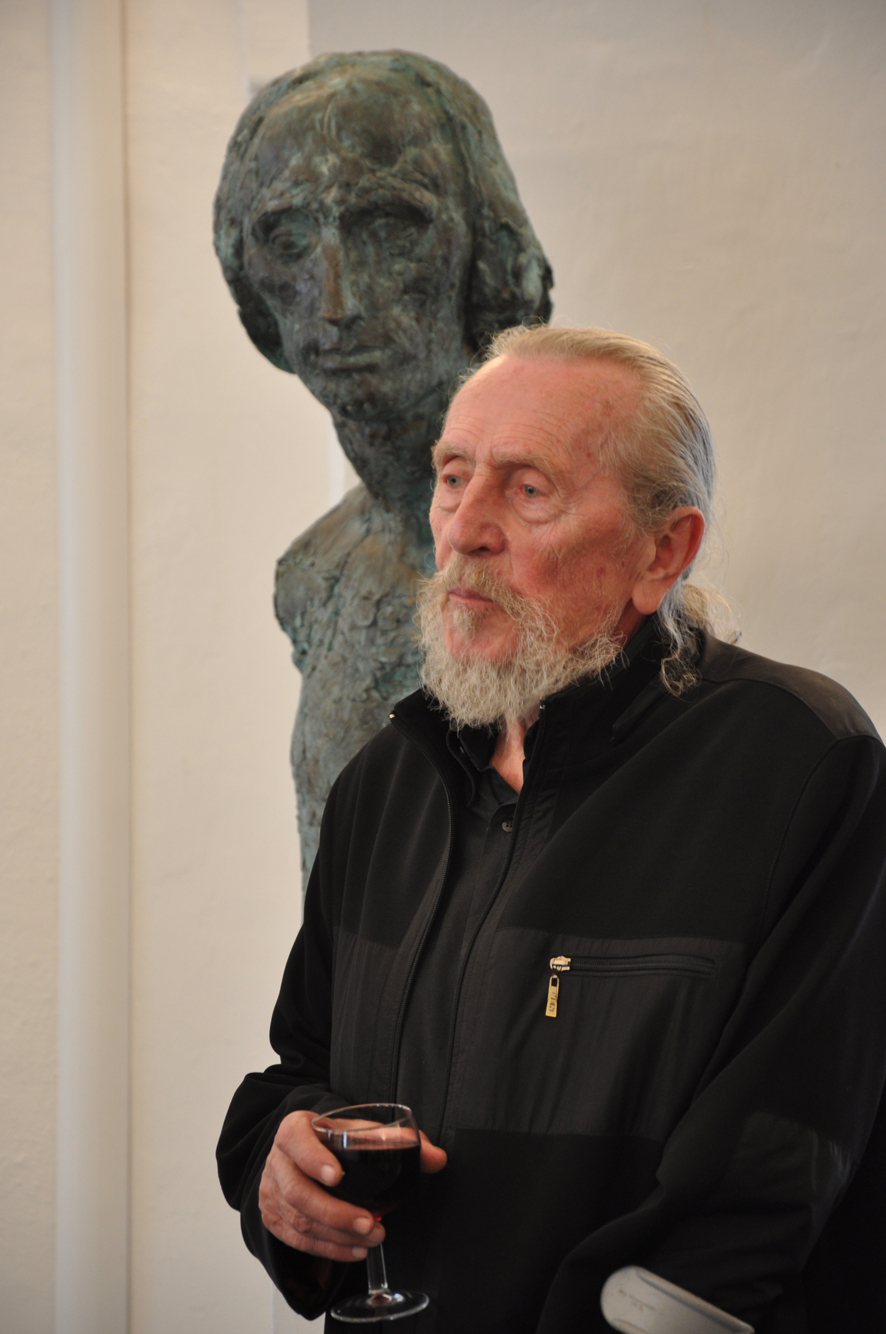
- Born: 24 July 1931; Most, Czechoslovakia
- Died: 12 August 2021 (aged 90)
- Known for: Sculpture

Stanislav Hanzík (24 July 1931 – 12 August 2021) was a contemporary Czech sculptor. He is especially known for free sculptures, portraits, and realizations together with architects.

== Biography ==
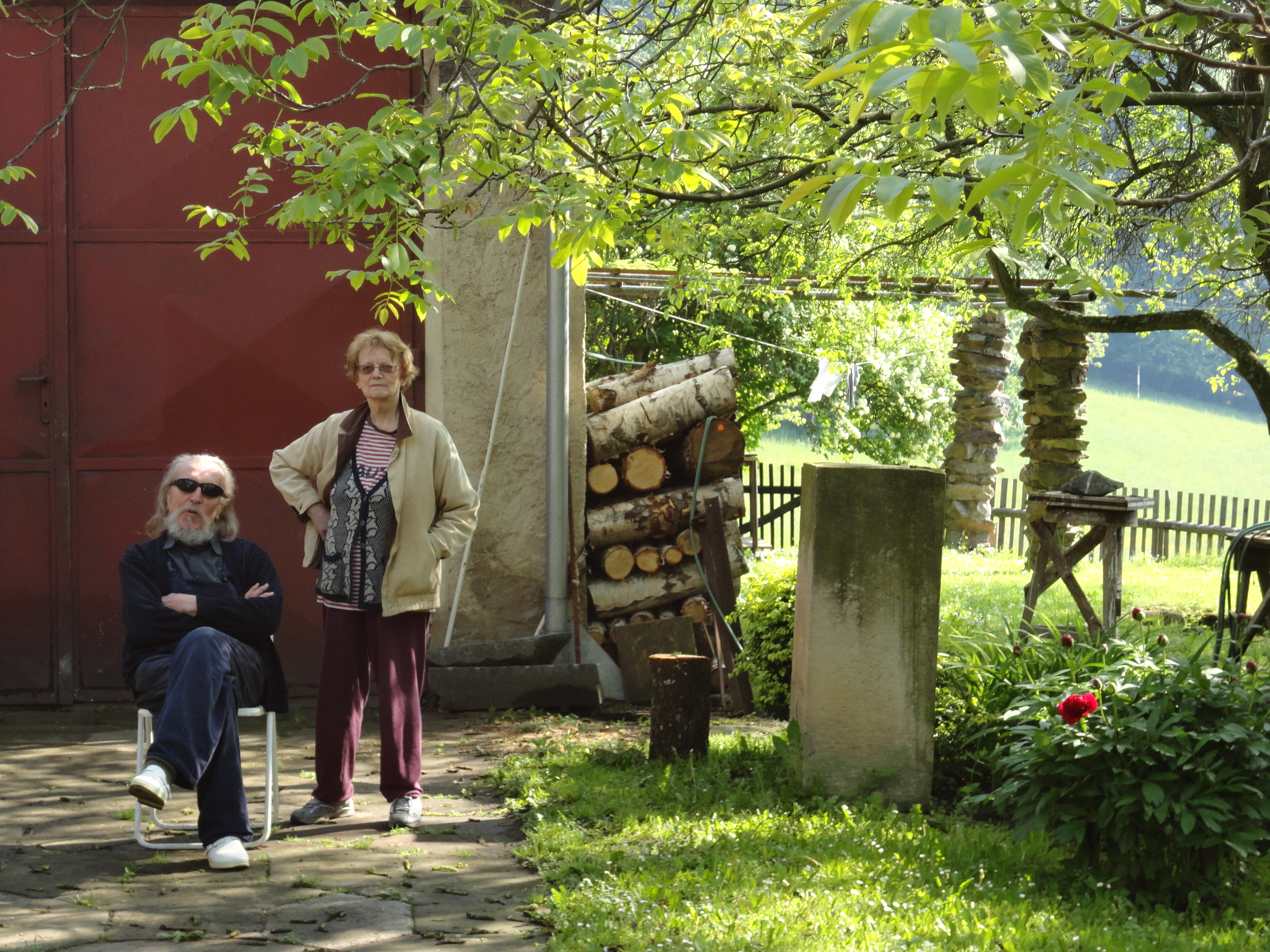
Stanislav Hanzík with his wife Květa in front of their house in Litvínov-Křižátky in 2012

Stanislav Hanzík was born on 24 July 1931 in Most, Czechoslovakia. During the Nazi occupation of Czechoslovakia (1938–1945), his family had to leave the Czech-German border region and moved closer to Prague, to Rakovník. Here Stanislav entered the gymnasium and created his first colored terracottas. He returned to Most in 1945 and made the acquaintance of his future wife Květa (she died in 2012). After a year's study at the Pedagogical Faculty of Charles University in Prague, under the tutelage of sculptor Karel Lidický, he enrolled in studies at the Academy of Fine Art in Prague under the sculptor Jan Lauda. Hanzík graduated in 1956 and was given the opportunity for another year's honorary study at the same school. In 1957, he rented part of a house in Malá Strana, one of the historic districts of Prague, and established there his studio where he worked until his death.

At that time, Hanzík was working on sculptures which predestined the future orientation of his work, such as Simeon (Old Man and Child), the terracotta sculpture Gorgona-Hiroshima, Welder, and Miner. He began presenting his work in 1959 at exhibitions held by the North Bohemian Branch of the Union of Fine Artists. In 1961, he was accepted as a postgraduate student at the Academy of Fine Arts in the studio of the sculptor Vincenc Makovský and his sculpture Welder was selected that year for the Czech exhibition at the "Biennale de la Jeunesse" in Paris. Hanzík was awarded, in direct international competition, the main sculpture prize. This achievement got him also a stipend which enabled him to study in France at the École des Beaux-Arts in Paris where he took the opportunity and joined the highly regarded studios of Ossip Zadkine and Henri-Georges Adam. In Hanzík's own studio in Paris, he began by now large series of dialogues and torsos. These first pieces were subsequently exhibited during the artist's first solo exhibition in the "Maison de la Culture" in Le Havre in 1963.

Following his return from France, in 1964, Hanzík continued his postgraduate studies and simultaneously taught modeling to students of architecture of the Academy of Fine Arts. He held solo exhibitions in the Czech cities, such as Litoměřice, Ostrava, Hradec Králové, Jičín, and elsewhere. His exhibition in Prague, at the "New Hall Gallery" in 1967 was a particularly great success for the artist. In this year, he accepted an offer from Karel Lidický to become his assistant at the Academy of Fine Arts. In 1970, Hanzík was habilitated a private docent. From 1991 to 1996 Hanzík taught at the University of Ostrava. From 1996 Hanzík devoted his entire time to his creating sculptural work.

During his long artistic activities, Stanislav Hanzík organized dozens of exhibitions and created numerous important sculptures. These can be seen in places such as the Romanesque rotunda of St. George on the Říp Mountain, in the Czech National Theater, in front of Carolinum in the Old Town of Prague, and on the Old Steps of Prague Castle, etc. Significant is Hanzík's work for the Northern Bohemia.

Hanzík's sculptures decorate many interiors and public places in a number of towns.

Stanislav Hanzík died at the age of 90 on 12 August 2021.

== From artist's work ==
1960: Welder (The Czech National Gallery, Prague; Gallery Litoměřice); 1964: Motherhood (nursery school, Most; the Czech National Gallery in Prague; Gallery Litoměřice); 1968: Mother Karyatida (monument for victims of Nazi concentration camp in Terezín); 1969: Impaled lion (crematorium of Most – devastated by vandals in 1990; The Czech National Gallery Prague); Dialog of a Poet and a Girl (sculptural open-air museum in Arandjelovac, Serbia)

1970: My Country (Most, atrium of the Czech bank); 1972: Josef Sudek, a bust (the Czech National Gallery in Prague; commemorative plaque in Prague); 1973: Chess Game (National Gallery in Prague); Lion's Fountain of Carolinum; 1974: Stanislav Neumann (foyer of the National Theatre, Prague); Courteous Dialogue (the castle park in Litvínov); 1976: the Good Shepherd (Rotunda of St. George on Říp ): 1978: The Czech Lion (City Hall, Most)

1983: Josef Kemr (foyer of the Czech National Theatre in Prague); 1984: Rudolf Hrušínský (foyer of the Czech National Theatre in Prague); 1987: Wrestling of a Lion with a Serpent (heraldic wall in the atrium of the Czech Parliament, Prague); 1988: Judgement of Paris (garden in the Troja Palace in Prague); The Pilgrim – Tribute to Karel Hynek Mácha (Litoměřice)

1990: The Horse (Vrchlického Park, wells in Teplice); 1999: commemorative plaque of Alphonse Mucha (Val-de-Grace, Paris)

2000: Crucifixion (Romanesque rotunda of St. George, Říp Mountain); 2001: commemorative plaque of A. Mucha (New York); Metamorphosis (grave of the architect Karel Kuča, the Czech National Cemetery, Vyšehrad - Prague); 2002: Josef Bican (grave in the Czech National Cemetery, Vyšehrad - Prague); 2003: the memorial stone of the Ústí nad Labem District, etc.

== Honours and prizes ==
Hanzík's sculptures have won numerous awards at home and abroad. Some of the prizes are:

- 1952: 1st prize of the Ministry of Culture and Education for the bust for the grave of Josef Zítek in Malenice;
- 1961: main prize for sculpture at the Biennale de la Jeunesse Paris for the sculpture Welder;
- 1962: award of achievement at the World Exhibition of Ceramics in Prague for the sculpture Gorgona-Hiroshima;
- 1966: 1st common prize with arch. M. Marak for the "Space of leisure time of youth", Liberec;
- 1976: 1st prize for the Good Shepherd for the interior of the Romanesque rotunda of St. George on Říp;
- 1988: Merited Czech Artist;
- 1999: the prize of the Society of Portrait Sculptors, London: medal of Jean Mason Davidson for the bust of the Czech writer Bohumil Hrabal;
- 2009: medal for his contribution to the University of Ostrava.

Stanislav Hanzík has also won prizes in thematic competitions associated with architect's implementations, e.g. 2003, the sculpture of the Czech national composer and song writer Karel Hasler at the Old Castle Steps, Courteous Dialogue in the Ursula Gardens, The New Stage of the National Theatre, Prague, The Lion Fountain of Carolinum, Prague, etc.

== Gallery ==
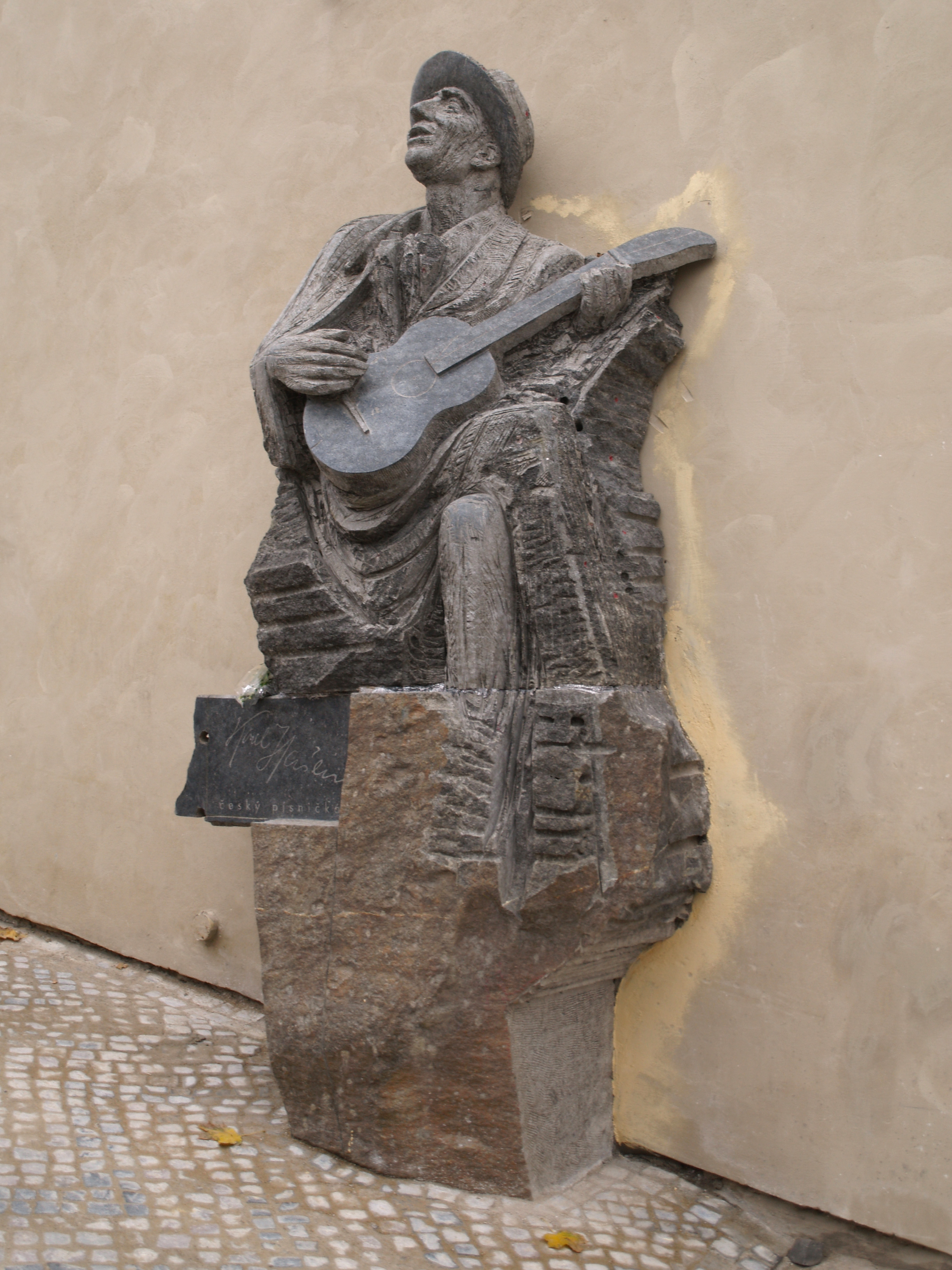
Karel Hašler, Old Stairs of Hradcany - Prague Castle, 2009, granite - diorite

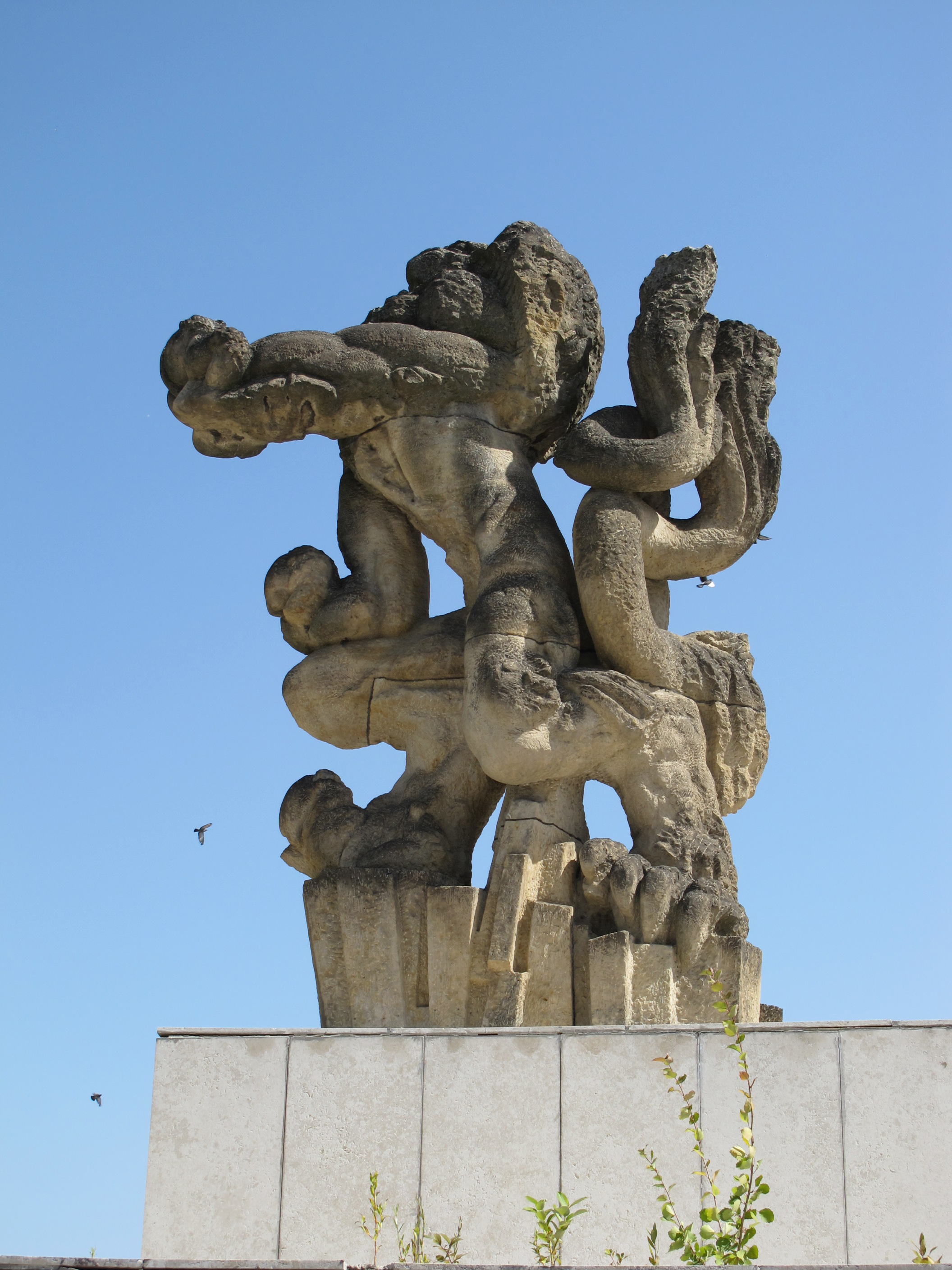
The Czech Lion, the Town Hall of Most, limestone, 1977
