= Wenceslas Square =

City square in Prague, Czechia

- Public square
- {{{other_names}}}
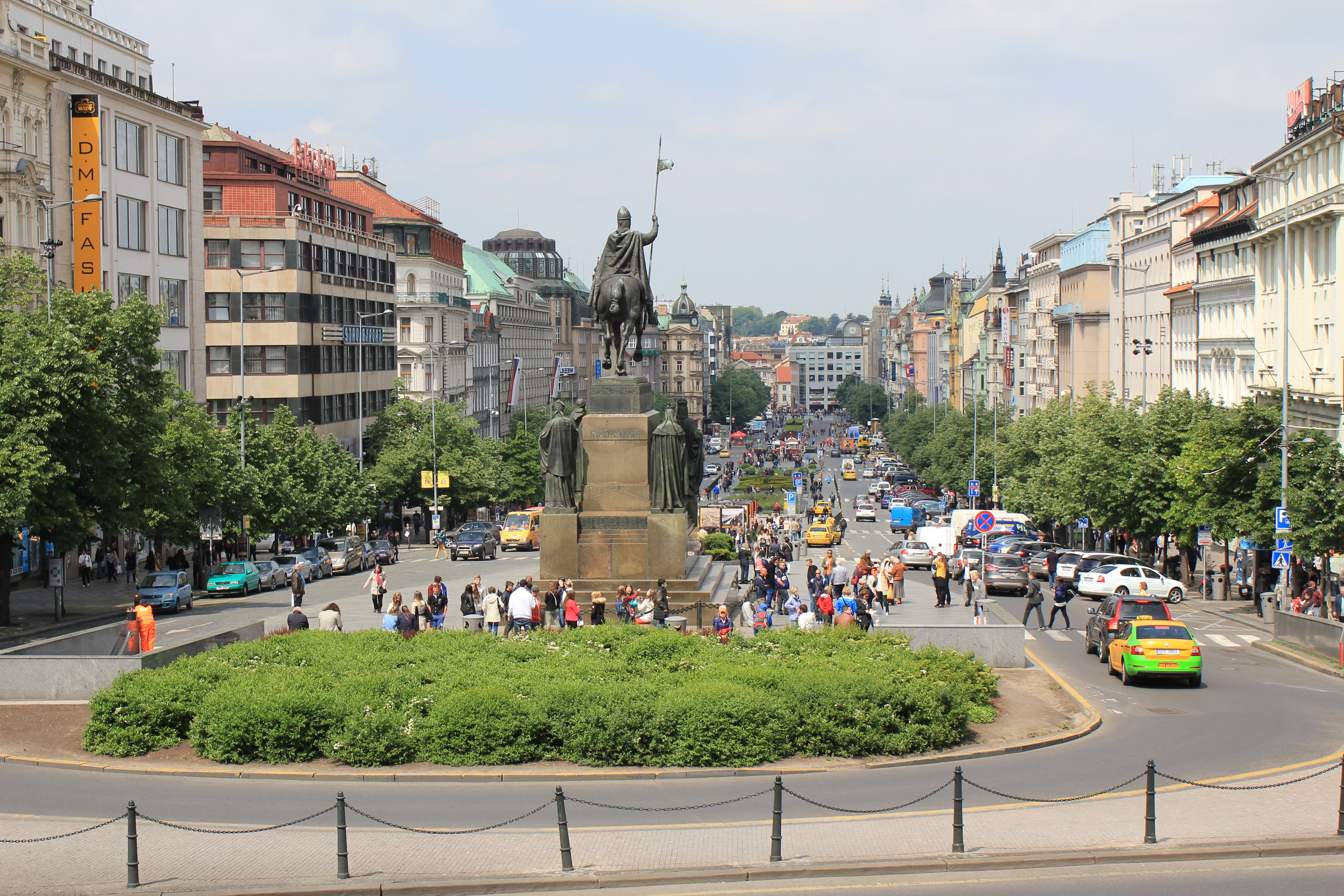
- View of Wenceslas Square. 2014
- Features: Statue of Saint Wenceslas; National Museum; pedestrian zone; shops; markets; hotels
- Location: Prague, Czech Republic
- Interactive map of Wenceslas Square
- Coordinates: 50°04′53″N 14°25′39″E

Wenceslas Square (Czech: Václavské náměstí, pronounced [ˈvaːtslafskɛː ˈnaːmɲɛstiː], colloquially Václavák, pronounced [ˈvaːtslavaːk]; German: Wenzelsplatz) is one of the main city squares and the centre of the business and cultural communities in the New Town of Prague, Czech Republic. Many historical events occurred there, and it is a traditional setting for demonstrations, celebrations, and other public gatherings. It is also the place with the busiest pedestrian traffic in the whole country. The square is named after Saint Wenceslas, the patron saint of Bohemia. It is part of the historic centre of Prague, a World Heritage Site.

Formerly known as Koňský trh or Rossmarkt (Horse Market), for its periodic accommodation of horse markets during the Middle Ages, it was renamed Svatováclavské náměstí (English: Saint Wenceslas square) in 1848 on the proposal of Karel Havlíček Borovský.

== Names ==
The designation Horse Market (Koňský trh) was used for the square according to its function from the very founding of the New Town of Prague in 1348.

In colloquial Czech, the name Koňský trh can still occasionally be encountered today, although usually in a humorous context.

A Baroque statue of Saint Wenceslas had stood in the Horse Market since 1680. The name Saint Wenceslas Square (Svatováclavské náměstí) was proposed by Karel Havlíček Borovský on 16 March 1848, commemorating the meeting held on 11 March 1848 in the Saint Wenceslas Baths, where the Saint Wenceslas Committee was established, and also honoring the patron saint of the Czech lands. The Mass celebrated at the statue on 12 June 1848 by the priest Jan Arnold is regarded as the beginning of the Prague June Uprising.

The nickname Václavák (a colloquial derivative of Václavské náměstí) has long been the most widespread informal name for the square and is used by all social groups in Prague.

During the 1940s–1960s, Prague youth (the so-called potápky and páskové, youth subcultures of the era) used the names Trafouš, Trafo, Traf, or Trafalgar. These were derived from Trafalgar Square in London, which served a similar central gathering function in London as Wenceslas Square did in Prague. By using these names during periods of political dictatorship, rebellious young people also expressed their affinity for British—and by extension American—culture, distinguishing themselves from first the Nazi Protectorate administration and later the Communist regime.

Another widely used expression since the 1960s has been Pod vocasem (meaning 'under the tail'), meaning the meeting place “under the horse” or “by the horse.” This refers to the tail of the horse in Myslbek’s monument of Saint Wenceslas. According to historian Dušan Třeštík, it is a gathering place of almost mythical significance for modern Czech history—a neuralgic point of the entire nation.

== Features ==
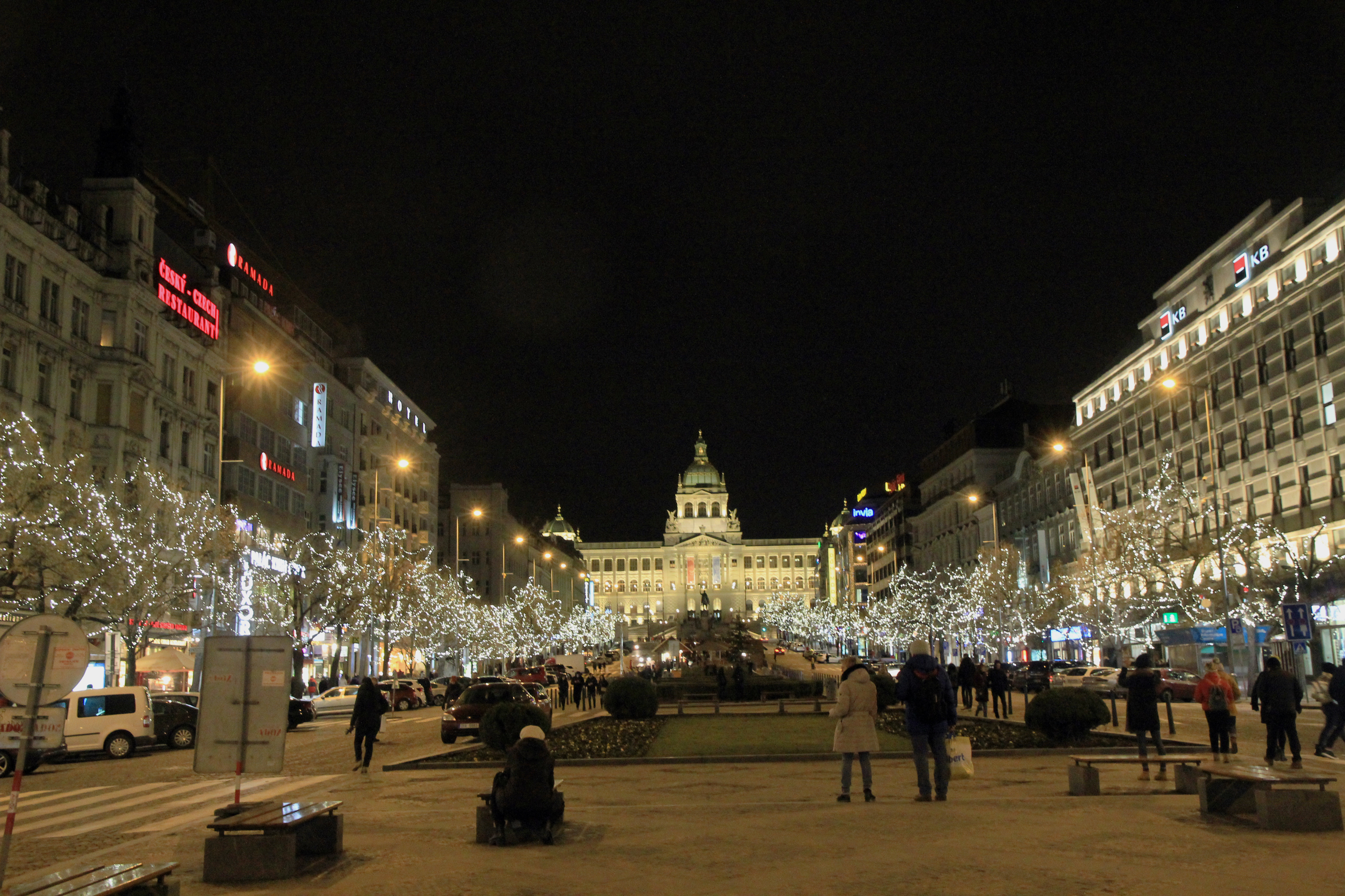
Wenceslas Square during Christmas. 2018

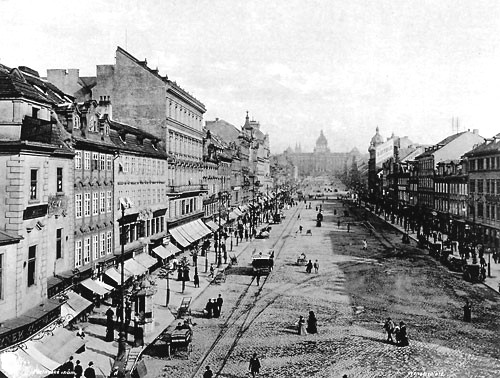
Tram line at Wenceslas Square at the end of the 19th century.

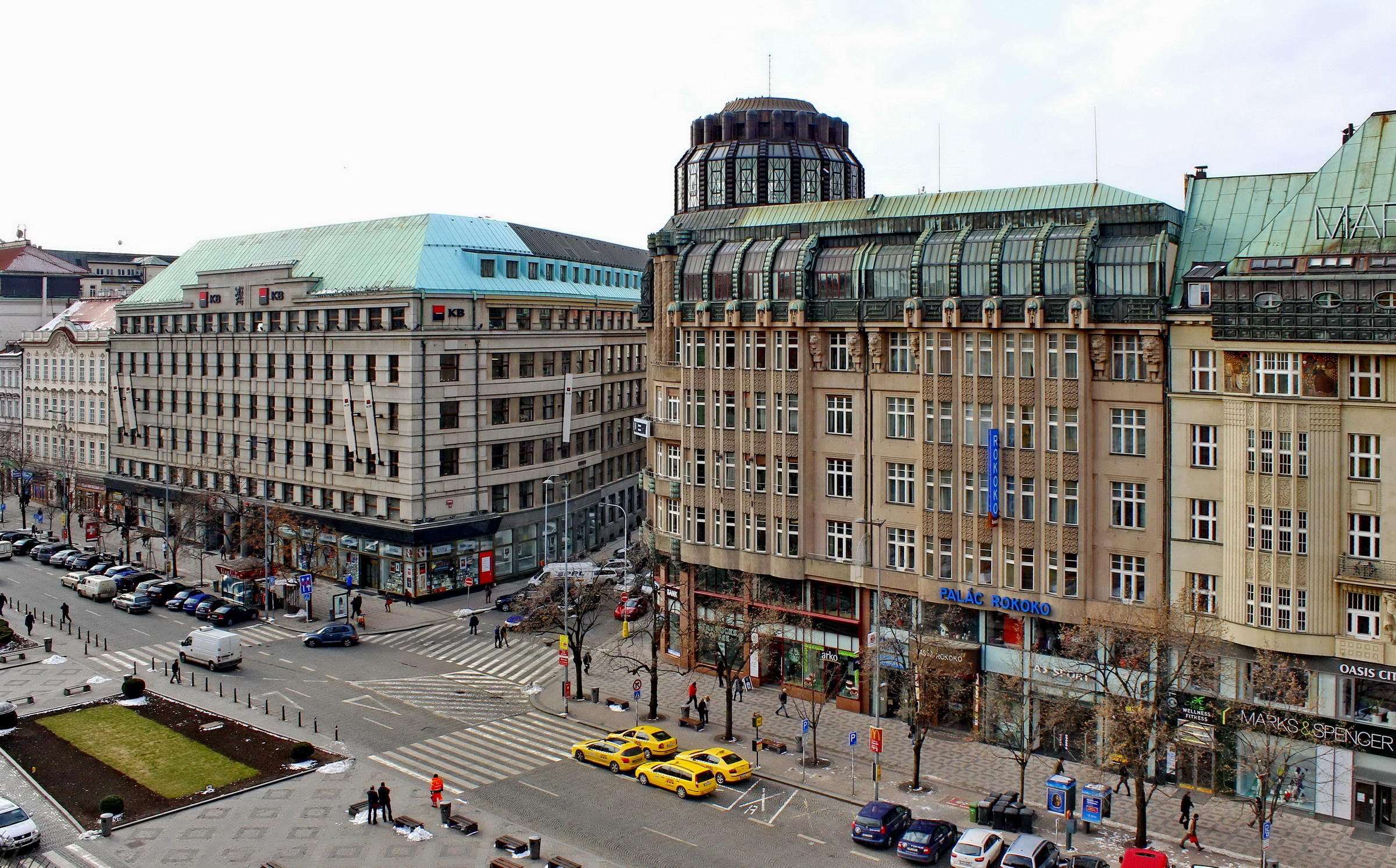
Central part of Wenceslas Square with Rokoko Palace built in 1916. 2022

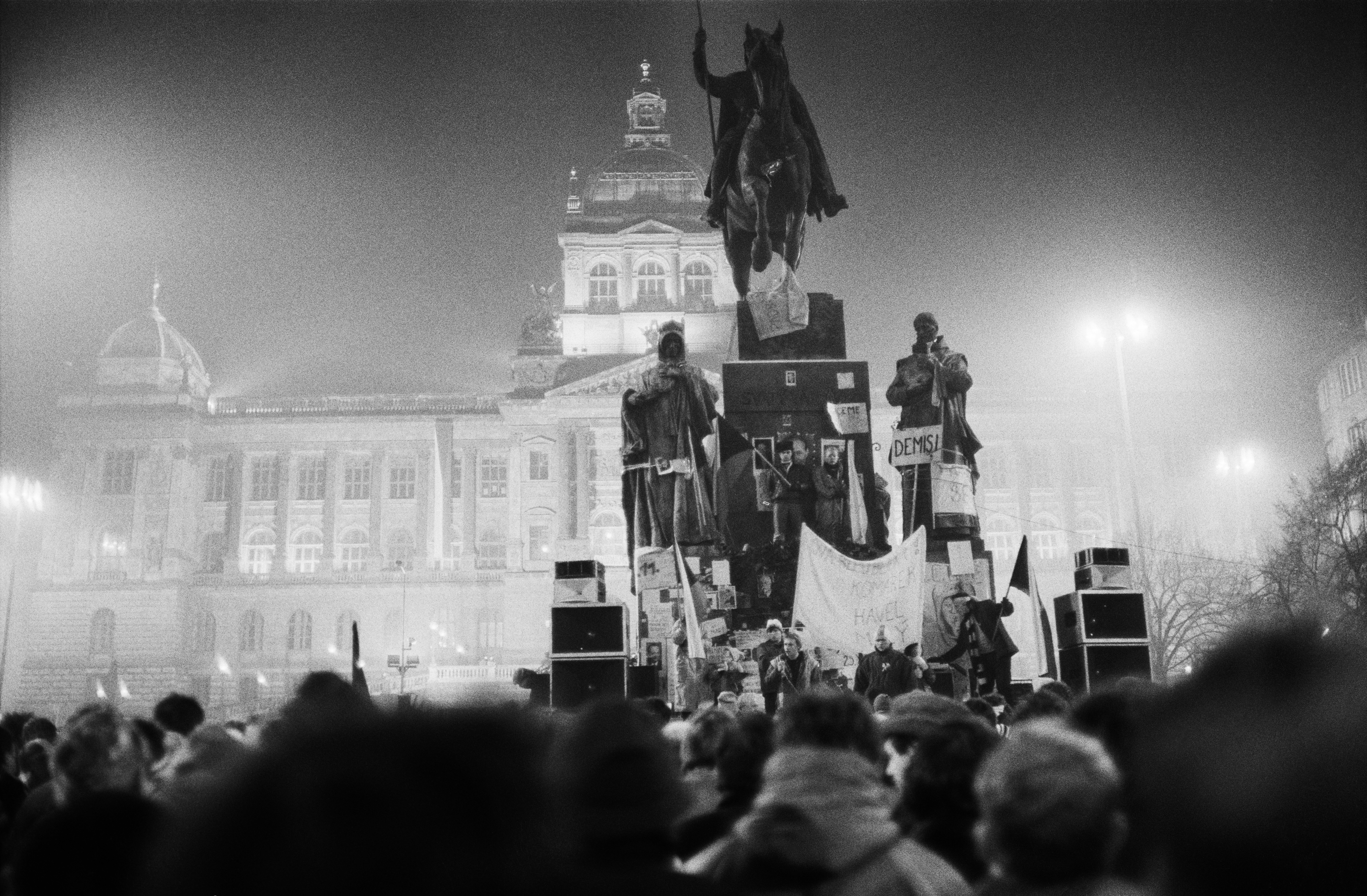
Protest rally at Wenceslas Square during the Velvet Revolution in 1989

Less a square than a boulevard, Wenceslas Square has the shape of a very long (750 m, total area 45,000 m^{2}) rectangle, in a northwest–southeast direction. The street slopes upward to the southeast side. At that end, the street is dominated by the grand neoclassical Czech National Museum. The northwest end runs up against the border between the New Town and the Old Town.

== History ==
In 1348, Bohemian King Charles IV founded the New Town of Prague. The plan included several open areas for markets, of which the second largest was the Koňský trh, or Horse Market (the largest was the Charles Square). At the southeastern end of the market was the Horse Gate, one of the gates in the walls of the New Town.

The Statue of Saint Wenceslas formerly stood in the middle of Wenceslas Square, near Grandhotel Evropa, it was moved to Vyšehrad in 1879. During the Czech National Revival movement in the Czech lands of Austria-Hungary in the 19th century, a more noble name for the street was requested. At this time the square was renamed and new Statue of Saint Wenceslas was built in 1912.

On 28 October 1918, Alois Jirásek read the Czechoslovak declaration of independence in front of the Saint Wenceslas statue.

During the 1938 May Crisis, the square was the site of massive demonstrations against Nazi Germany's demands for the Sudetenland and the appeasement policies of the First Czechoslovak Republic's allies the United Kingdom and France. Under the Protectorate of Bohemia and Moravia, the Nazi occupation force used the street for mass demonstrations. During the Prague Uprising in 1945, a few buildings near the National Museum were destroyed. They were later replaced by department stores.

On 16 January 1969, student Jan Palach set himself on fire in Wenceslas Square to protest the Warsaw Pact invasion of Czechoslovakia in 1968.

On 28 March 1969, the Czechoslovak national ice hockey team defeated the USSR team for the second time in that year's Ice Hockey World Championships. As the Czechoslovak Socialist Republic was still under Soviet occupation, the victory induced great celebrations. An estimated 150,000 people gathered on Wenceslas Square, and skirmishes with police developed. A group of provocateurs then attacked the Prague office of the Soviet airline Aeroflot, located on the street. The vandalism served as a pretext for reprisals and the period of so-called normalization.

In 1989, during the Velvet Revolution, large demonstrations (with hundreds of thousands of people or more) were held here.

Wenceslas Square is lined by hotels, offices, retail stores, currency exchange booths and fast-food joints. Many strip clubs also operate around Wenceslas Square. Wenceslas Square is also a popular place to spend the New Year's celebrations, another popular option are terraces near the river. The Christmas markets (Vánoční trhy) are held here every year from early December to the first week of January.

=== Reconstruction ===
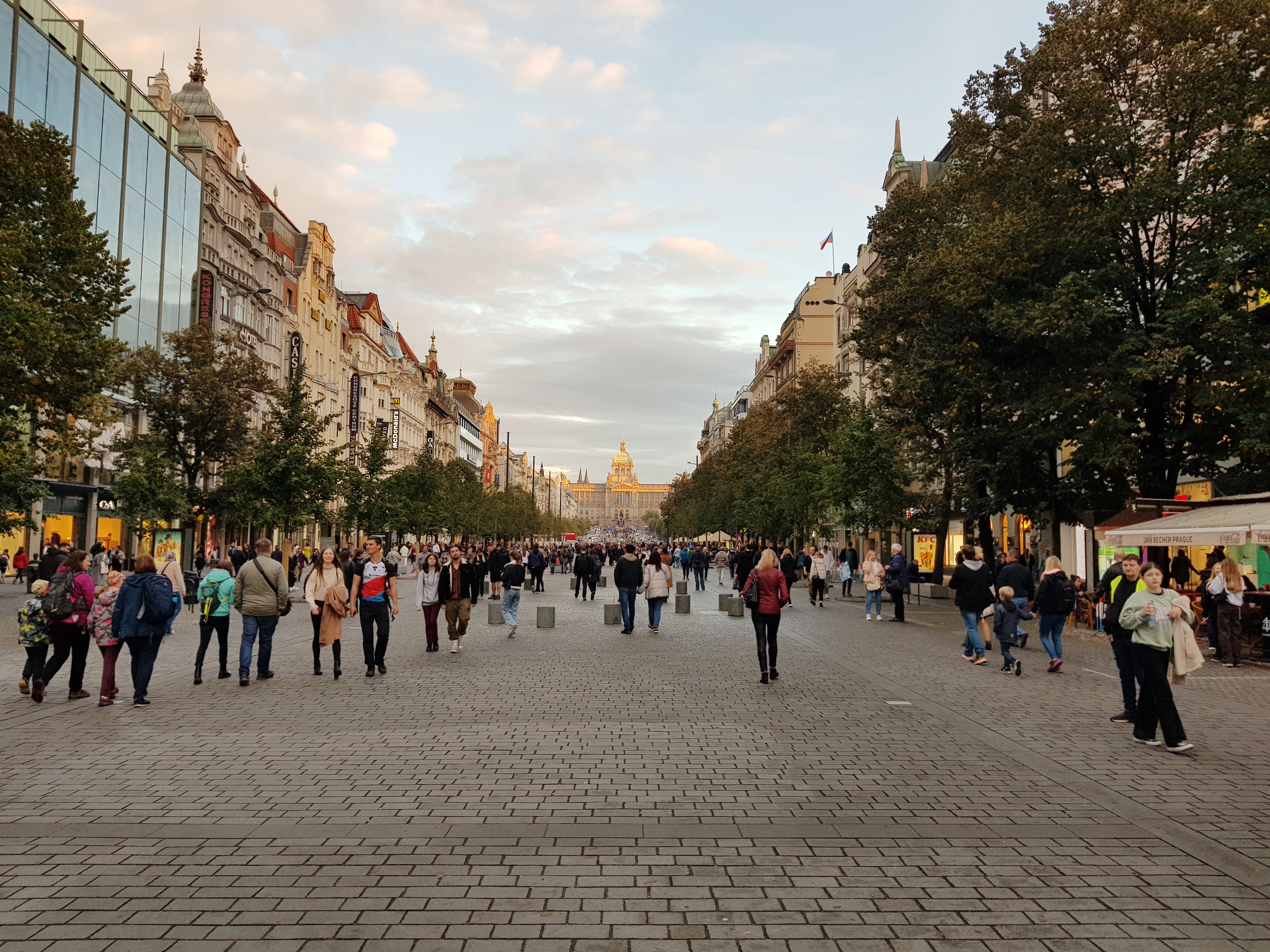
Reconstruction of the lower part of Wenceslas Square confirmed the already existing pedestrian zone, uniting the surfaces and adding new alleys. 2022

A reconstruction of the Wenceslas Square has been underway since 2020. The lower part was completed in 2023. Construction of the new upper part (from Vodičkova street) is to begin in June 2024. It will include wider sidewalks, tram tracks, bicycle paths, new alleys and reduction of the space dedicated to motor traffic. Full completion is scheduled for summer 2027. The expected cost is 1.24 billion Czech crowns.

== Art and architecture ==
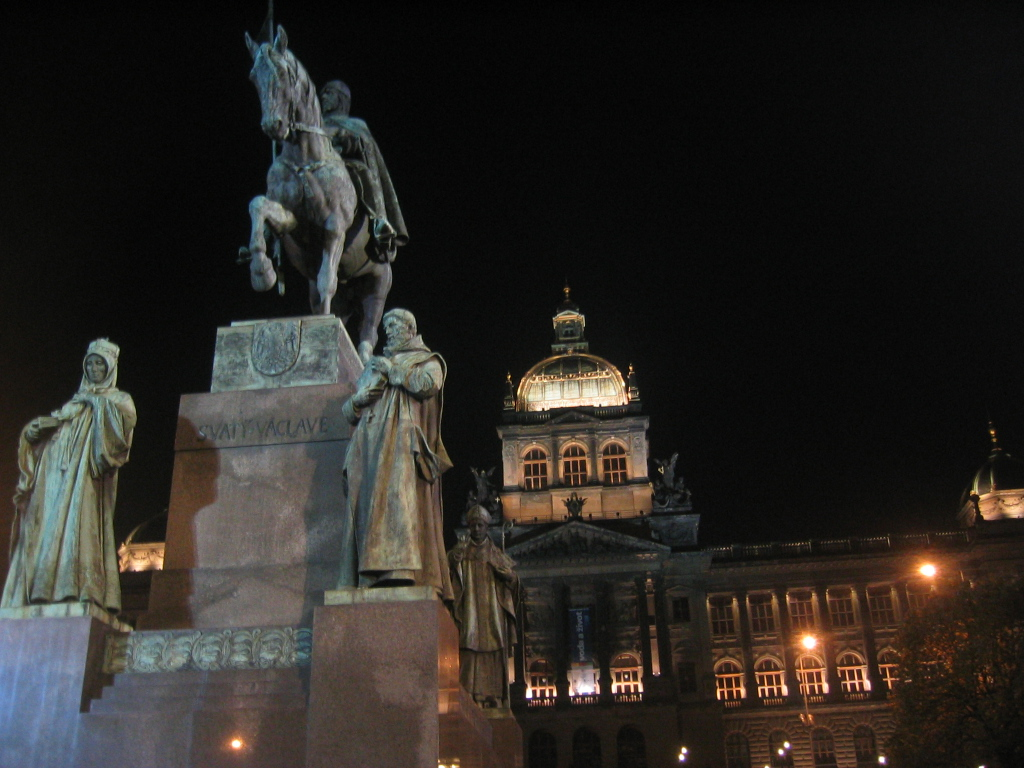
Wenceslas Monument and National Museum, at night

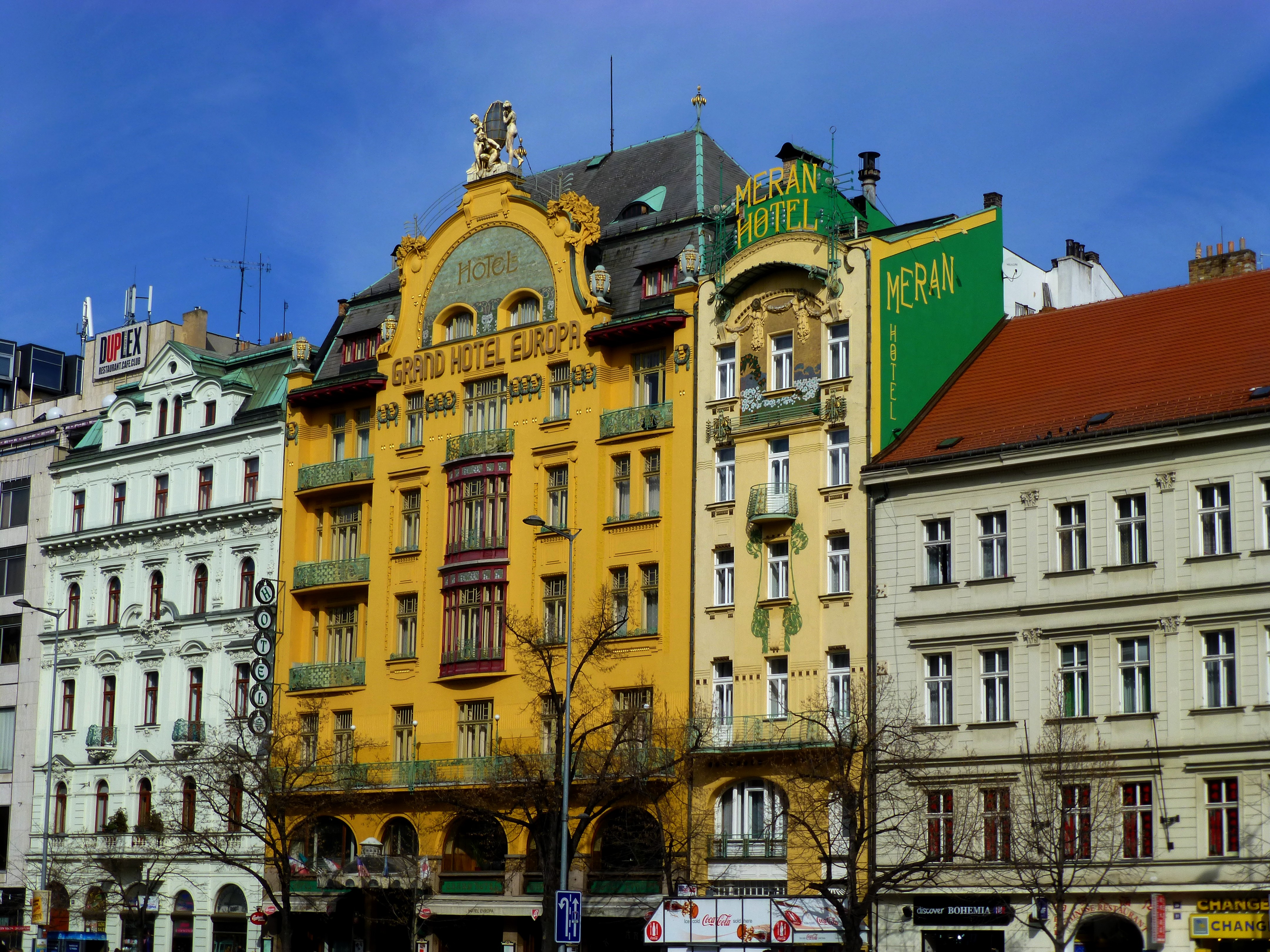
Grand Hotel Evropa built in 1872

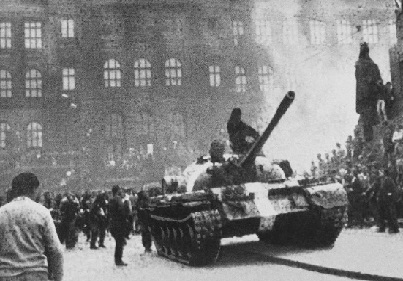
Warsaw Pact invasion of Czechoslovakia

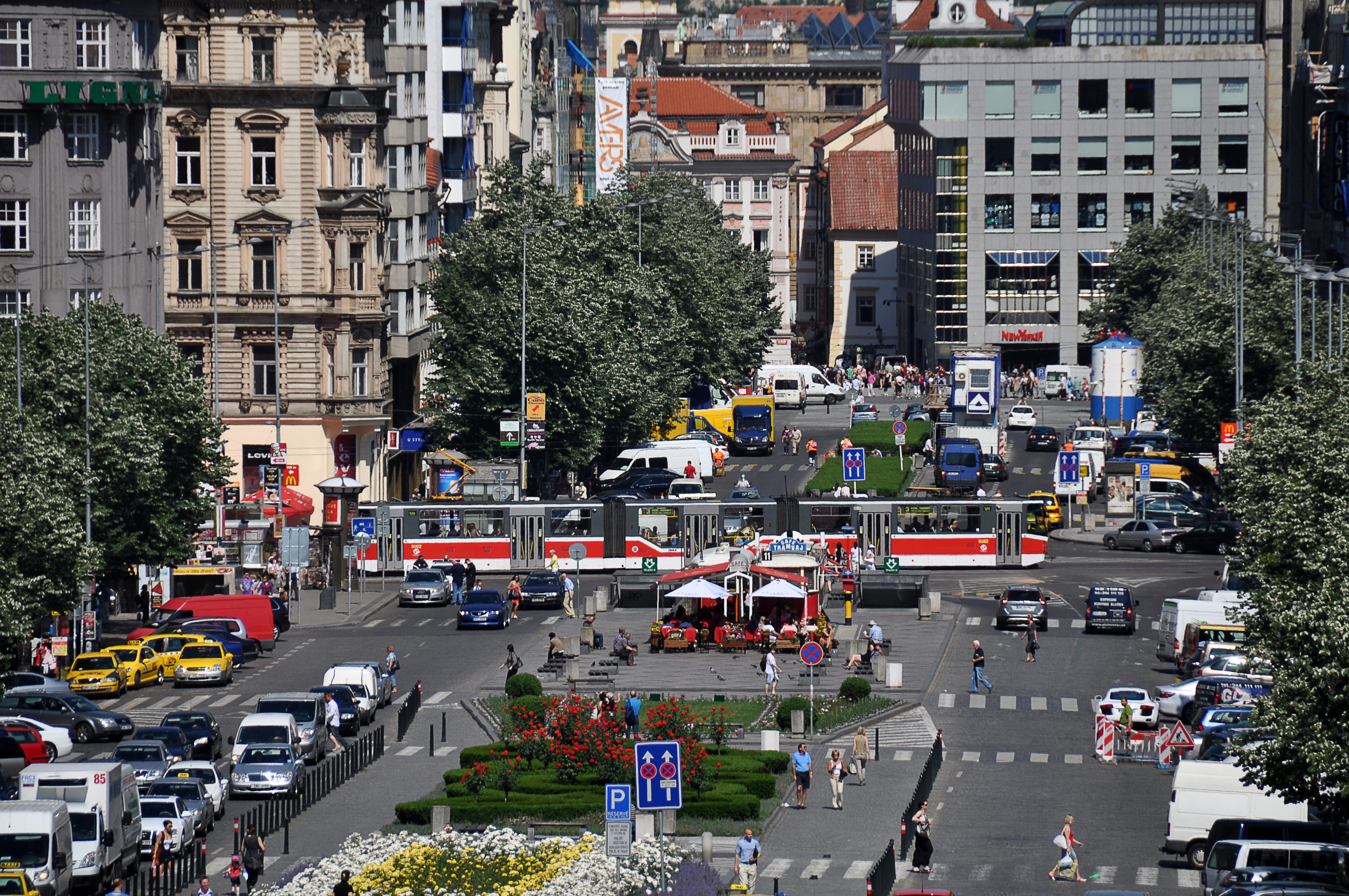
Tram line and the northwest part of the square. 2011

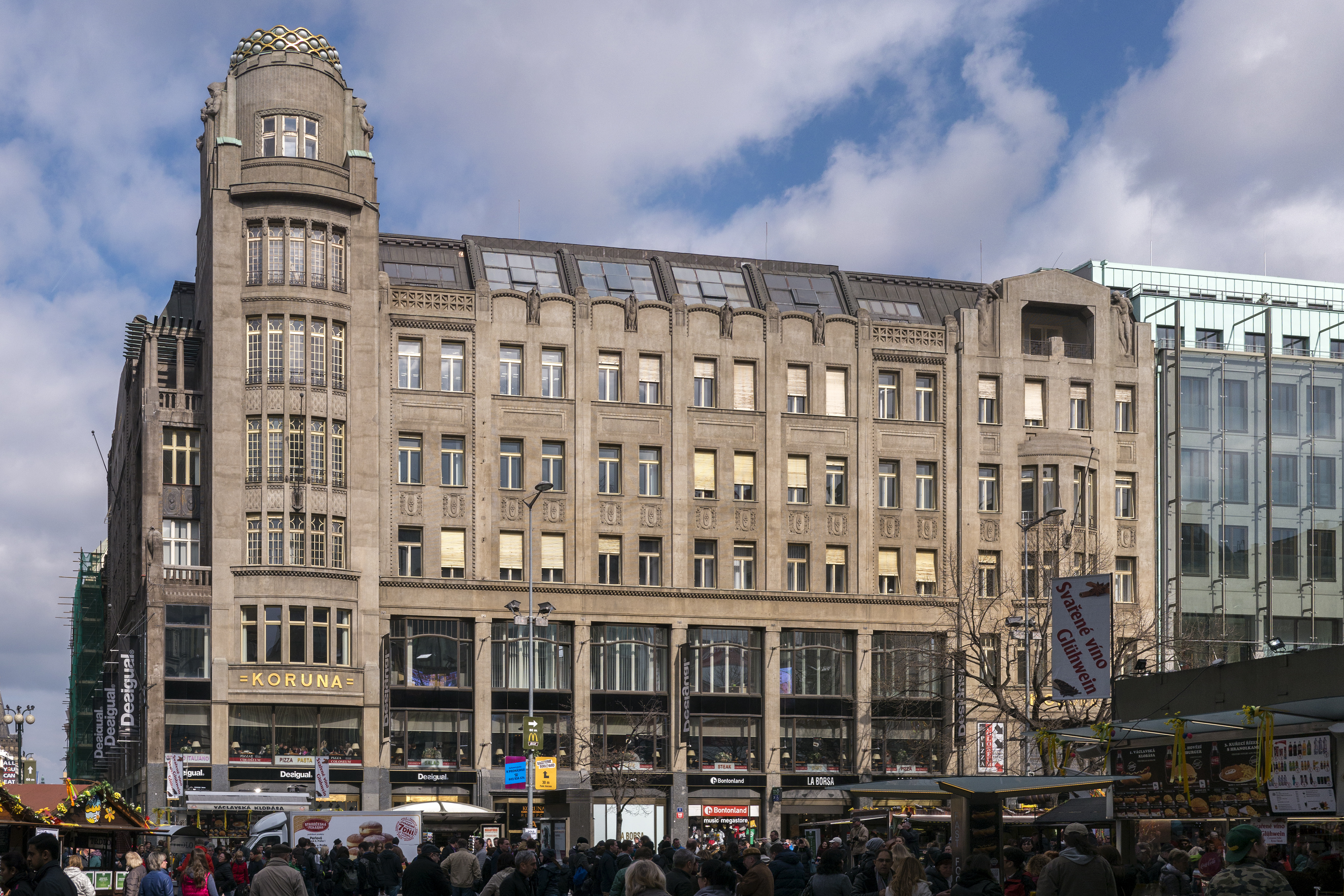
Koruna Palace built in 1912

The two obvious landmarks of Wenceslas Square are at the southeast, uphill end: the 1885–1891 National Museum Building, designed by Czech architect Josef Schulz, and the statue of Wenceslas.

Other significant buildings on the square include:

- Antonin Pfeiffer and Matěj Blecha's "Palác Koruna" office building and shopping center, #1–2, 1912–1914, with architectural sculpture by Vojtěch Sucharda
- Ludvík Kysela's "Lindt Building", No. 4, an early work of architectural constructivism
- the BAŤA shoe store, No. 6, 1929
- Matěj Blecha and Emil Králíček's "Adam Pharmacy", No. 8, 1911–1913
- Jan Kotěra's "Peterka Building", No. 12, 1899–1900
- Pavel Janák's "Hotel Juliš", No. 22, 1926
- Alois Dryák's "Hotel Evropa", #25–27, 1872, 1905 redesign, with architectural sculptor Ladislav Šaloun
- Antonin Wiehl's "Wiehl House", No. 34, 1896
- the "Melantrich Building", No. 36, 1914, where Alexander Dubček and Václav Havel appeared together on its balcony in November 1989, a major event of the Velvet Revolution
- "Hotel Adria", No 26, reconstruction in 1912, in 1918 sold to František Tichý, Burian's Theatre (1925–1928)

== Transport ==
The Prague Metro's line A runs underneath Wenceslas Square, and the Metro's two busiest stations, Muzeum (lines A and C) and Můstek (lines A and B), have entrances on the street. Currently trams only cut across the square. Tram tracks running the length of the square were removed in 1980; a proposal to reintroduce the tram line has been approved, with construction beginning in 2024. Most of the street is open to automobile traffic, but the northwestern end has been pedestrianised since 2012.

== Literary references ==
- A tavern in the square, the Golden Goose, is mentioned in Franz Kafka's Amerika, as the place where the Manageress previously worked.
- Wenceslas Square is a 1988 play by Larry Shue, set in Prague during the aftermath of the 1968 Soviet invasion.
- Wenceslas Square is the name of a story written by Arthur Phillips, which takes place in the Czechoslovak Socialist Republic at the end of the Cold War. The story was published in the compendium Wild East: Stories from the Last Frontier, and featured in episode 337 of the WBEZ radio show This American Life.
- "Wenceslas Square" featured in Marc Adnitt's short film "You Want Christmas?" in December 2008.

== See also ==
- Franciscan Garden, Prague
