= Bust of Václav Štulc =

Sculpture in Prague, Czech Republic

- Busta probošta Václava Štulce (Czech)
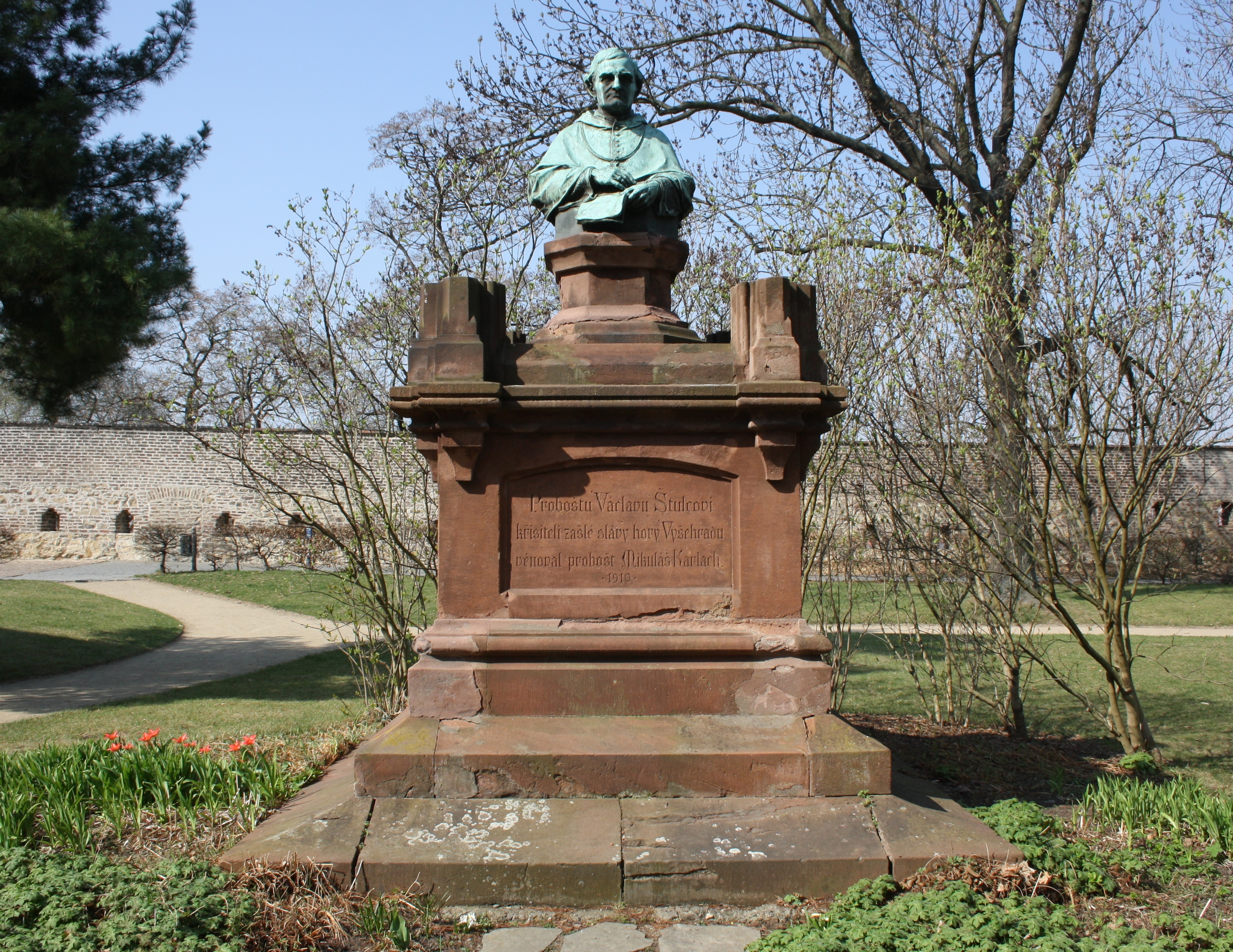
- The bust in 2012
- Type: Sculpture
- Subject: Václav Štulc
- Location: Prague, Czech Republic; 50°3′56.39″N 14°25′2.3″E

The bust of Václav Štulc (Czech: Busta probošta Václava Štulce) is installed at Štulcovy sady in Vyšehrad, Prague, Czech Republic.
