= Devil's Column =

Stone formation in Prague, Czech Republic

- Čertův sloup
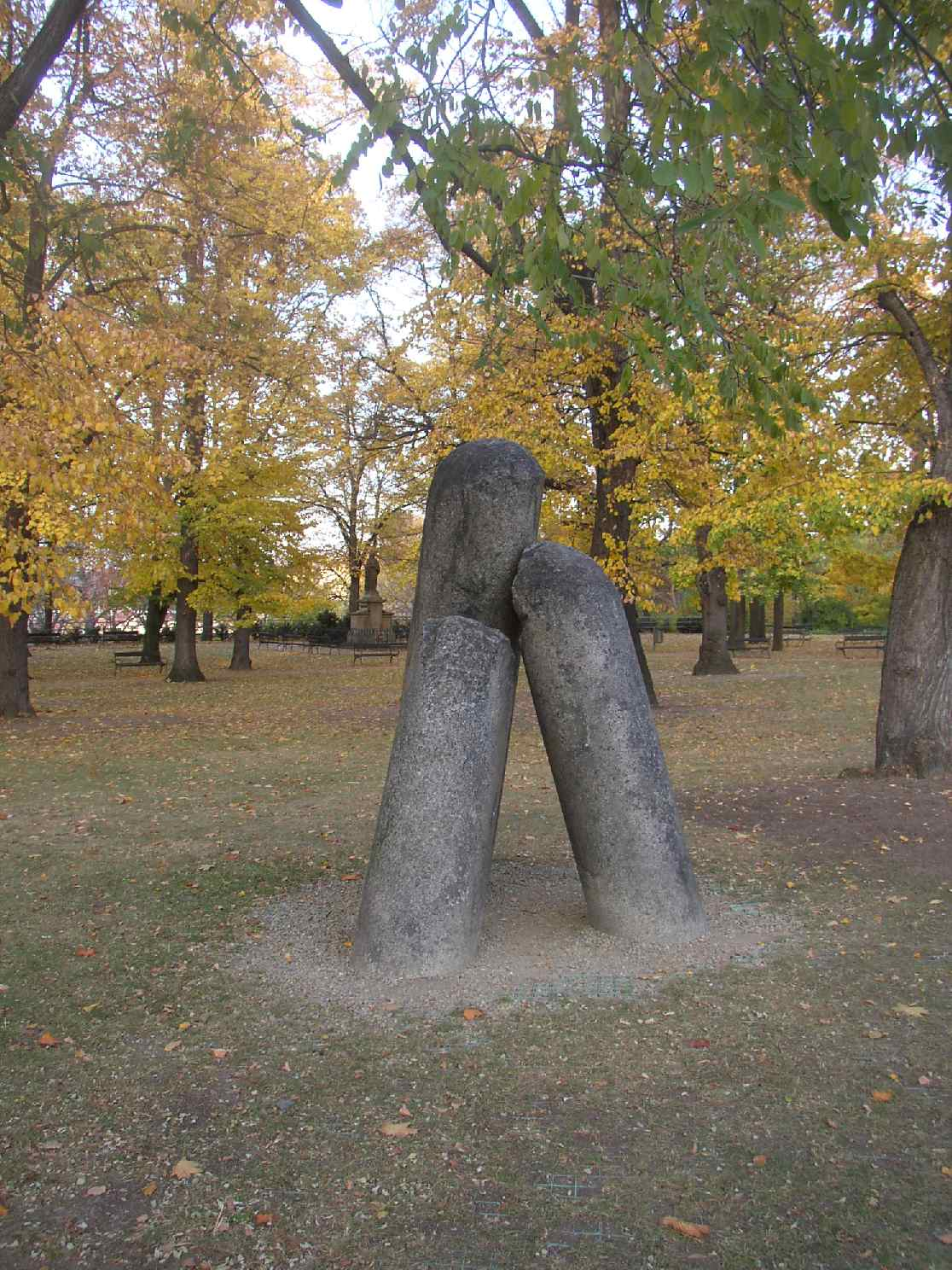
- The column in 2005
- Interactive map of the Devil's Column area

General information
- Type: Formation of three stone columns
- Location: Vyšehrad, Prague, Czech Republic
- Coordinates: 50°3′51.67″N 14°25′8.53″E

Devil's Column (Czech: Čertův sloup) is a formation of three stone columns, located in Vyšehrad, Prague, Czech Republic.

For the first time, it was mentioned in the book Bellum hussiticum as fragments of one column, standing on the cemetery of the St. John Baptist Decapitation church in Vyšehrad. According to the story of about 1700, one priest made a bet with the devil, that he would celebrate Mass before the devil brings a column from the St. Peter's basilica in Rome. The devil lost and, out of anger, he threw the column from a height to the ground. According to geologists the column is cut of granodiorite and it originates from a central Bohemian quarries in surroundings of Sázava.
