= Vyšehrad =

Historic fort in Prague, Czech Republic

- Vyšehrad (Czech)
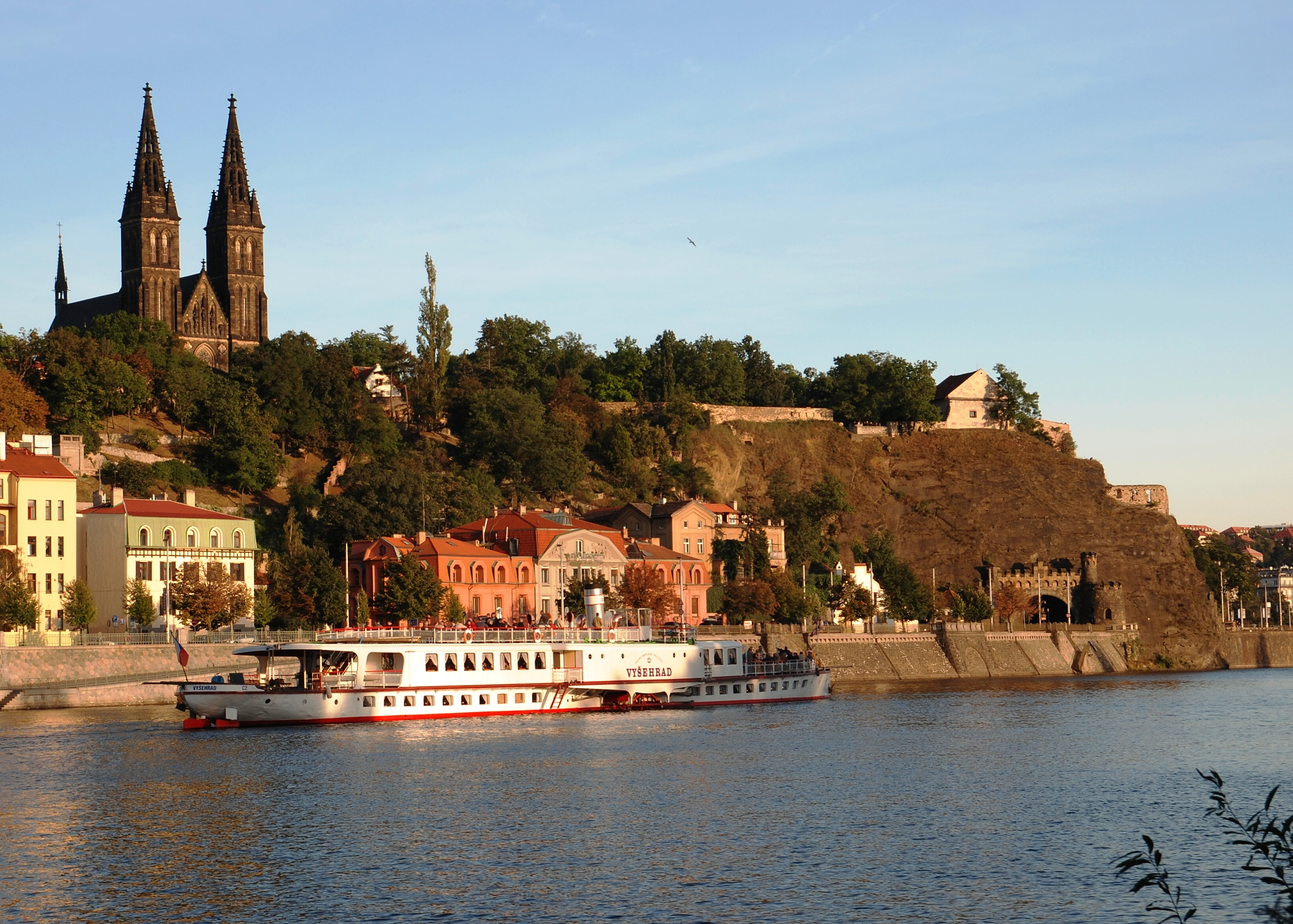
- Vyšehrad from the northwest

- Location within Czech Republic
- 50°03′51″N 14°25′10″E
- Type: Cultural

History
- Built: 10th century

Site notes
- Architectural styles: Romanesque, Gothics, Neo-Gothic, Baroque

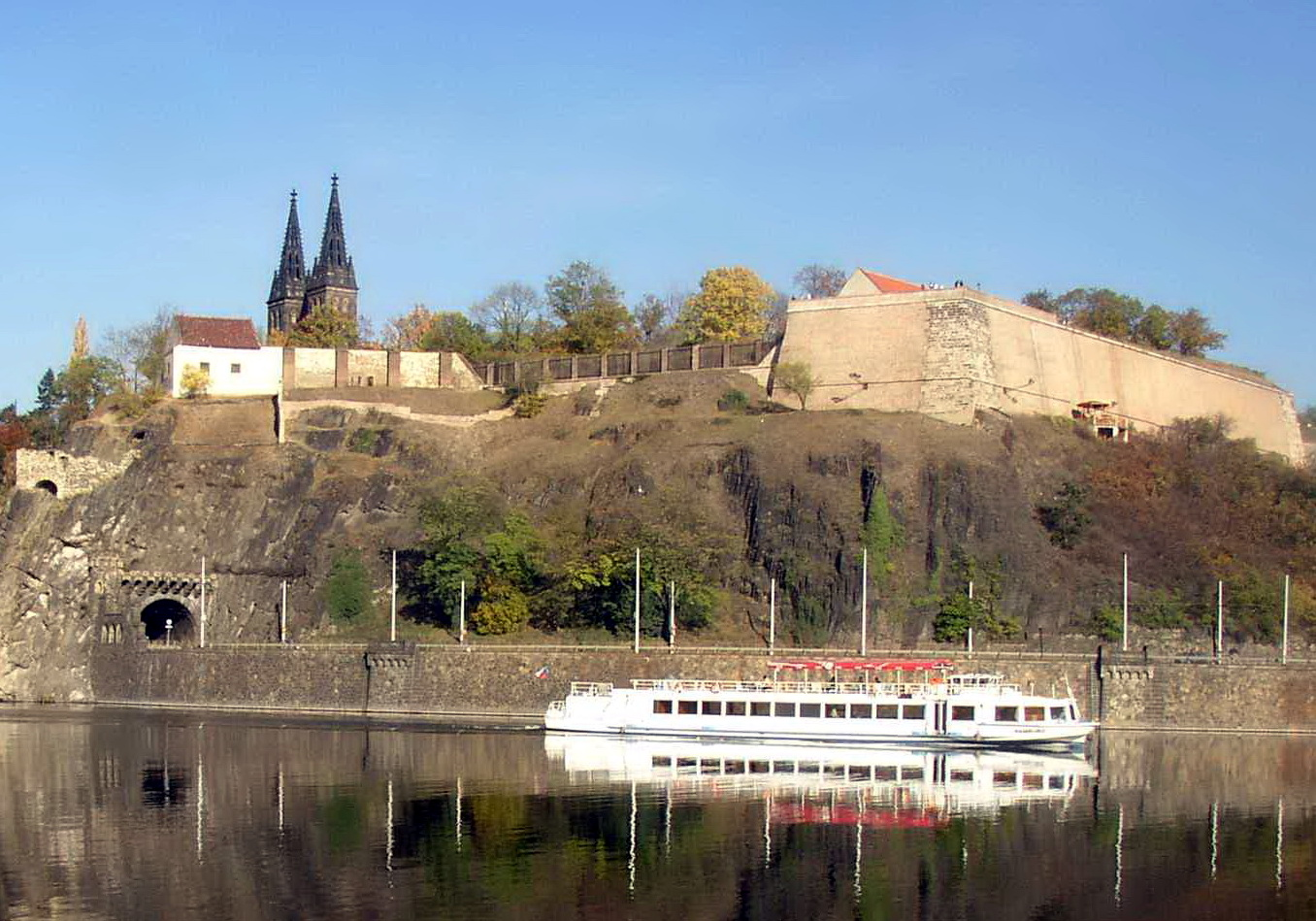
Vyšehrad from the southwest

Vyšehrad (German: Wyschehrad, Prager Hochburg, English: "upper castle") is a historic fort in Prague, Czech Republic, just over 3 km southeast of Prague Castle, on the east bank of the Vltava River. It was likely founded in the 10th century. Inside the fort are the Basilica of St. Peter and St. Paul and the Vyšehrad Cemetery, containing the remains of many famous Czechs, such as Antonín Dvořák, Bedřich Smetana, Karel Čapek, and Alphonse Mucha. It also contains Prague's oldest Rotunda of St. Martin, from the 11th century.

== History ==
Local legend holds that Vyšehrad was the location of the first settlement which later became Prague, though thus far this claim remains unsubstantiated.

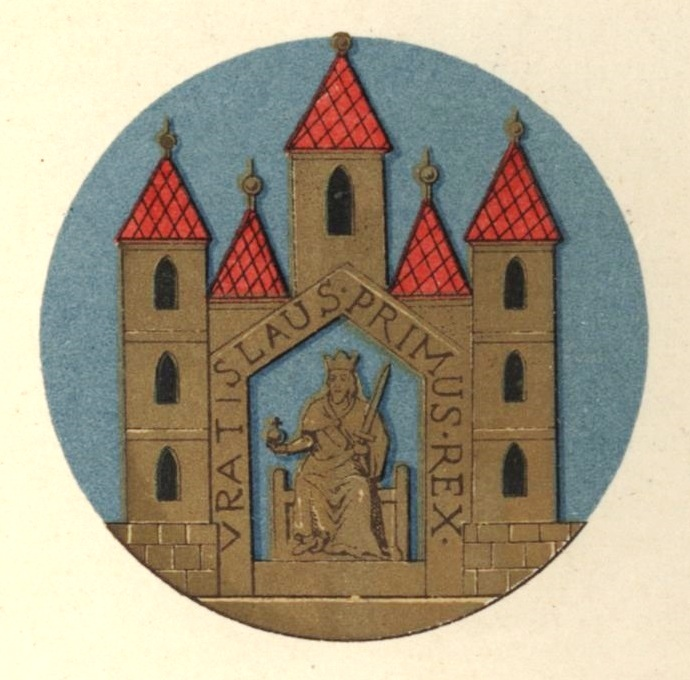
Coat of arms of Vyšehrad from 19 century

Legend has it that Duke Krok founded Vyšehrad while looking for a safer seat than in Budeč. On a steep rock above the Vltava river, he ordered a forest to be cut down and a castle built there. Also according to legend, Prince Křesomysl imprisoned the knight Horymír at Vyšehrad because he damaged silver mines, and Horymír jumped with his horse Šemík over the walls and from Libuše's bath into the river.

When the Přemyslid dynasty settled on the current site of Prague Castle, the two castles maintained opposing spheres of influence for approximately two centuries. The zenith of Vyšehrad was during the second half of the 11th century, when Vratislav II transferred his seat from Prague Castle to Vyšehrad, and the original fort was remodeled as a complex comprising the sovereign's palatial residence, a church, and the seat of the chapter. The period of growth ended around 1140 when Prince Soběslav moved his seat back to Prague Castle.

When Holy Roman Emperor Charles IV began to build the Prague Castle in its current dimensions in the early 14th century, the deteriorating Vyšehrad was abandoned as a royal seat. Later the whole complex was renewed by Charles IV and new fortifications, with two gates and a royal palace were built, while the Basilica of Saints Peter and Paul awaited repair. At the beginning of the Hussite Wars, the Hussites conquered and ransacked Vyšehrad in 1420. The troops of King George of Poděbrady did the same in 1448. The castle was then abandoned and became ruined. It underwent a renovation in the 17th century, when the Habsburg monarchy took over the Czech lands after the Thirty Years' War and remodeled it in 1654 as a Baroque fortress, turning it into a training center for the Imperial Army of the Emperor, and later incorporating it into the Baroque city walls.

The present form of Vyšehrad as a fortified residence, with powerful brick ramparts, bastions, and the Tábor and Leopold gates, is a result of Baroque remodeling. The Cihelná brána (Brick gate) is an Empire-style structure, dating from 1841. The main part of the Špička Gate, parts of the Romanesque bridge, and the ruined Gothic lookout tower known as Libušina lázeň (Libuše's Bath) are the only fragments that have been preserved from the Middle Ages. The Romanesque rotunda of St. Martin dates from the second half of the 11th century. The 11th century Basilica of Sts. Peter and Paul, which dominates Vyšehrad, was remodeled in the second half of the 14th century and again in 1885 and 1887 in neo-Gothic style. Vyšehrad and the area around it became part of the capital city in 1883. The area is one of the cadastral districts of the city.

By the twenty-first century, Vyšehrad has become a public park that is a popular site for recreation and celebrations. For example, it is a popular place for Czechs to celebrate New Year's Eve.

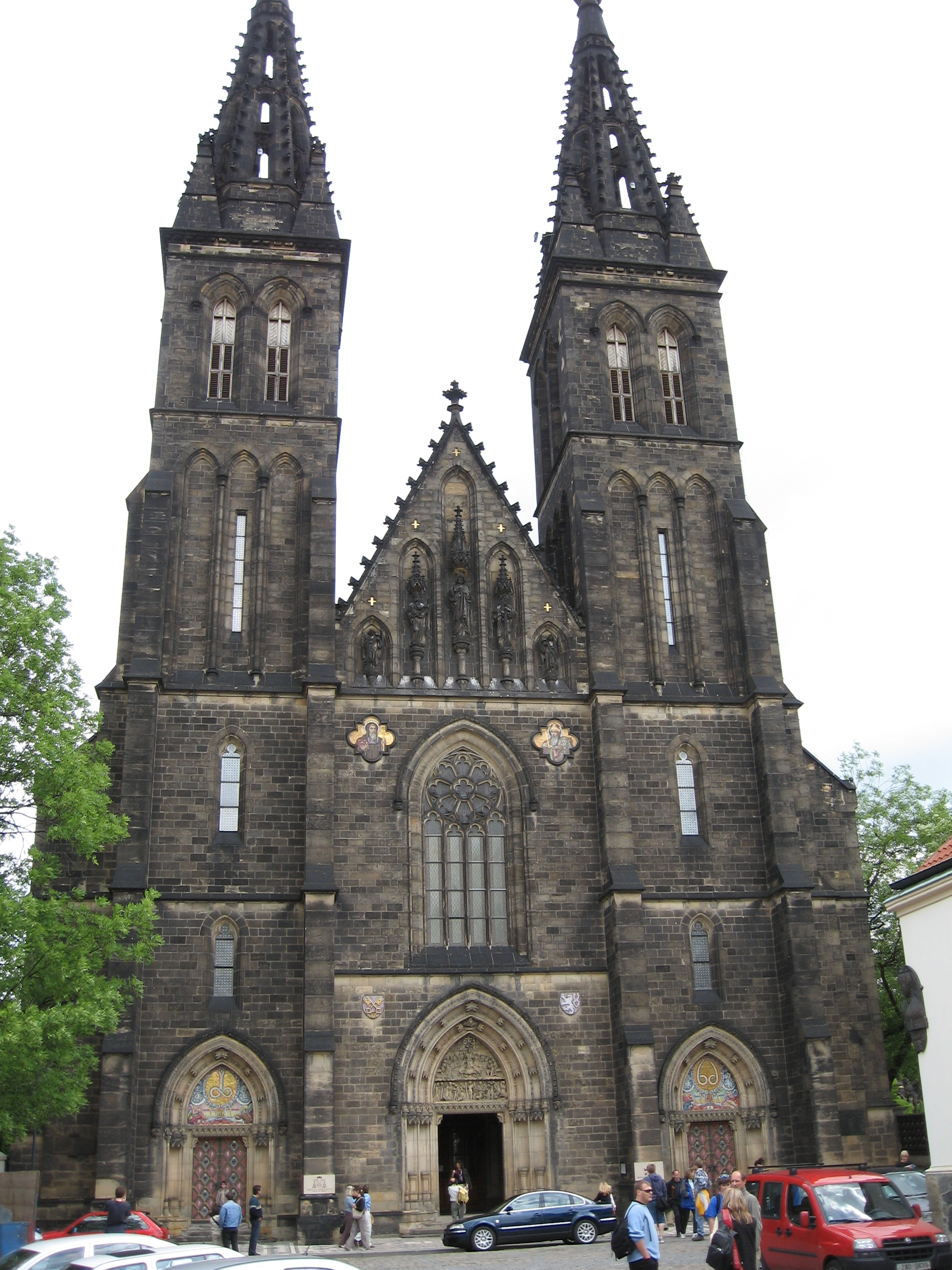
Front of the Basilica of St. Peter and St. Paul

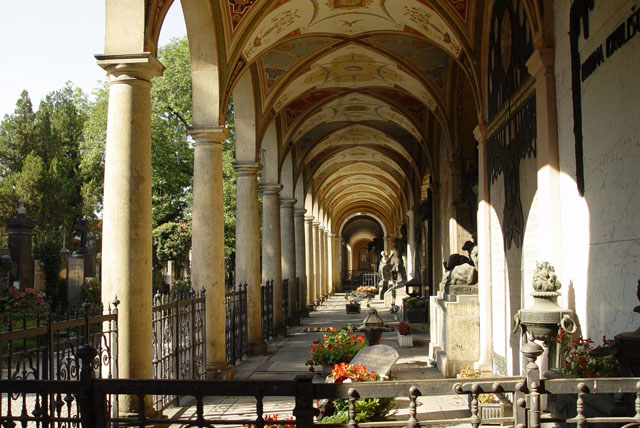
Vyšehrad Cemetery

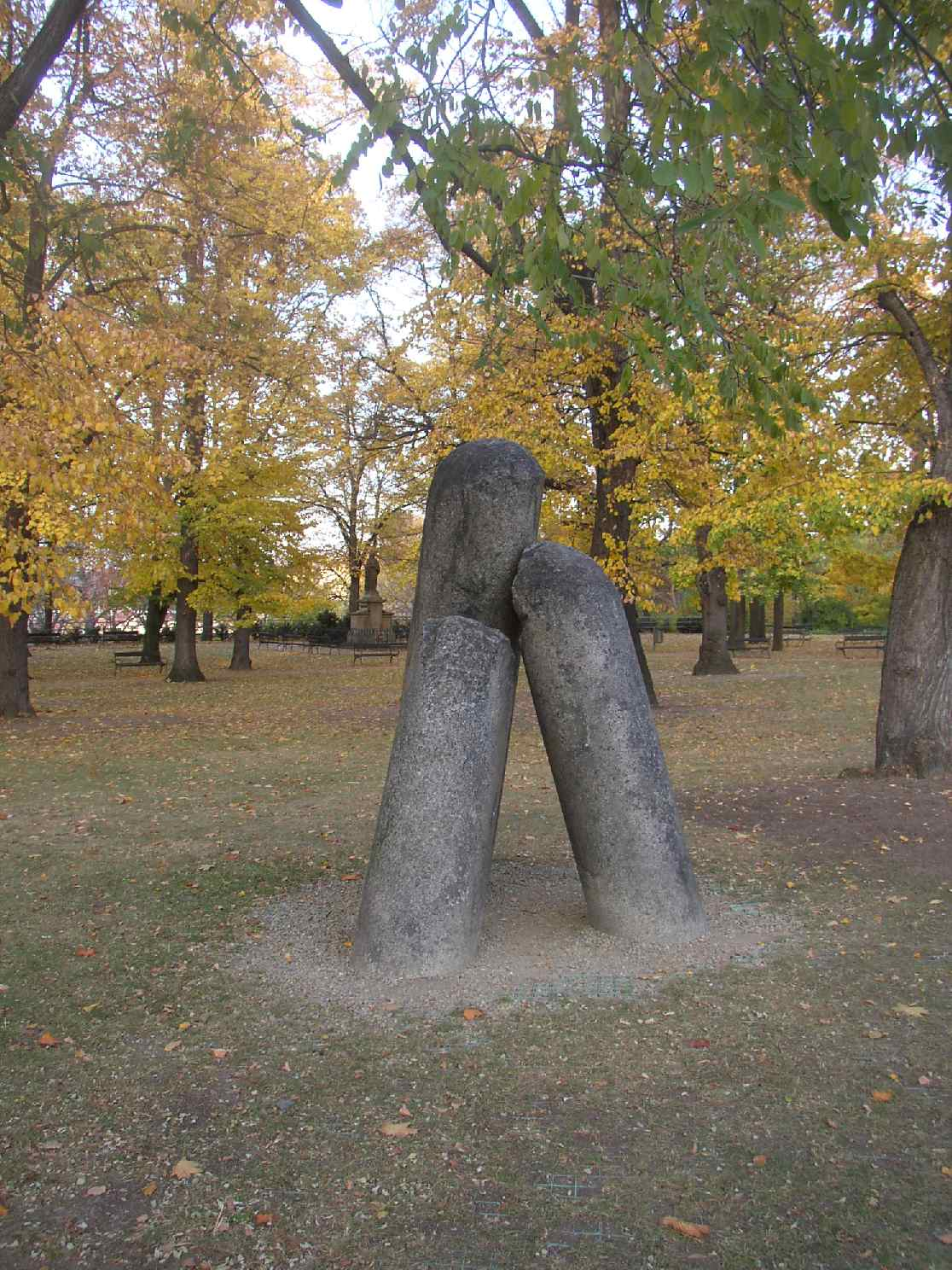
Devil's Column

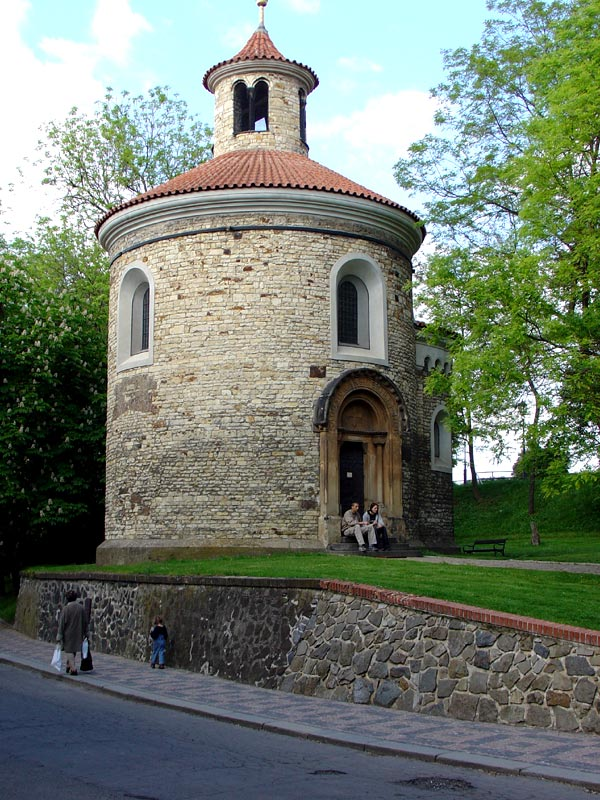
Oldest Rotunda of St. Martin from 11th century

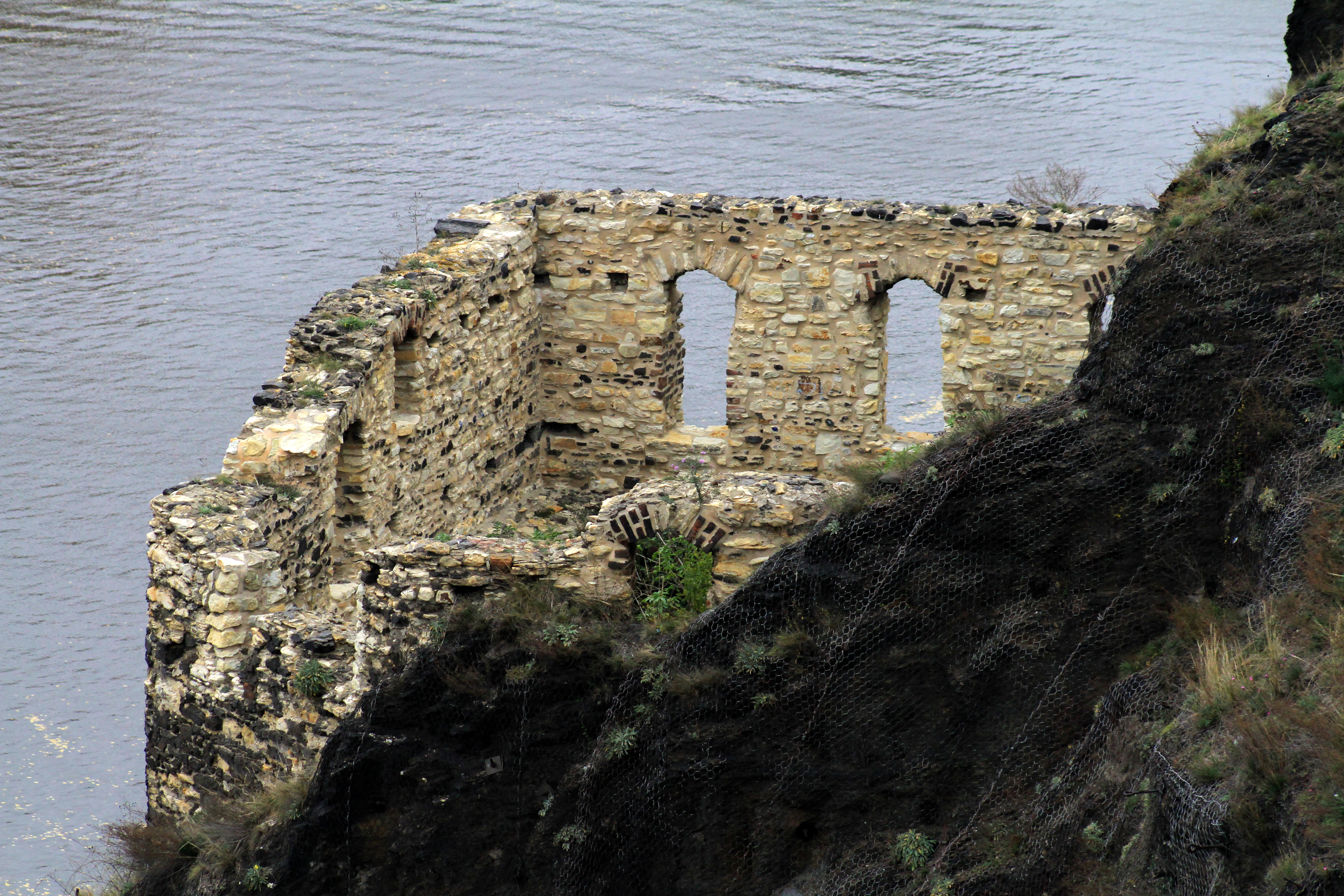
Libuše's bath

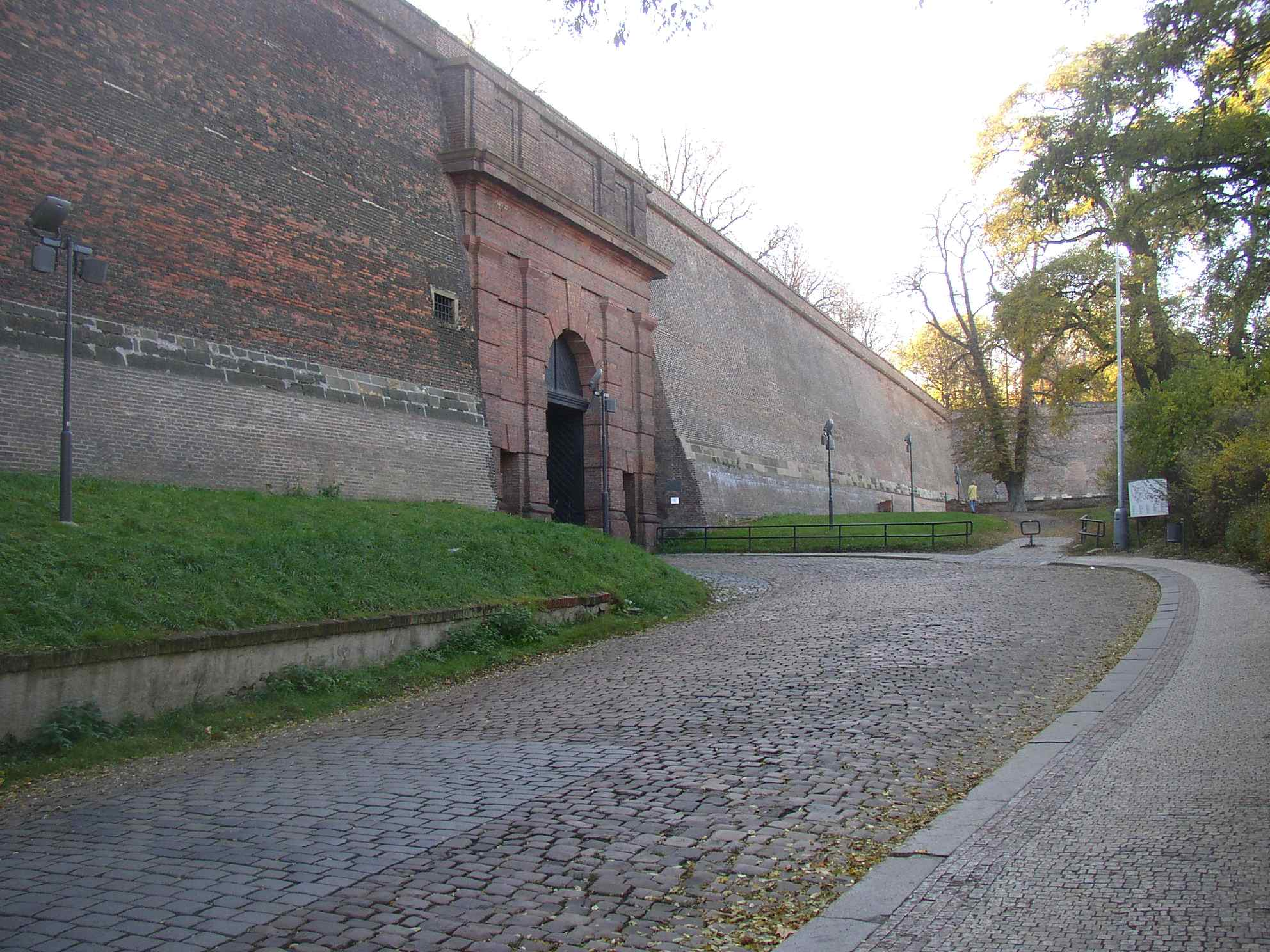
Brick Gate at Vyšehrad

== Statues ==
- Josef Václav Myslbek's statues south of the church, originally from Palacký Bridge
  - Libuše and Přemysl – mythical Czech rulers settled in the 8th century at Vyšehrad
  - Ctirad and Šárka – the characters of the Maidens' War, when women after the death of Libuše built the castle Děvín lying on the opposite hill of the Vyšehrad
  - Lumír and Píseň – Lumír was a legendary famous singer who refused to sing celebration song after the Maidens' War ended to the winning men and instead of it sang about the famous Vyšehrad
  - Záboj and Slavoj – leaders of the rebellion against invasion of the German troops of Charlemagne, allegedly led the victorious battle in 805
- Statue of Mikuláš Karlach, Karlach's sets
- Statue of Saint Wenceslas by Johann Georg Bendl, northwest bastion
- Bust of Václav Štulc, near Nové proboštství building
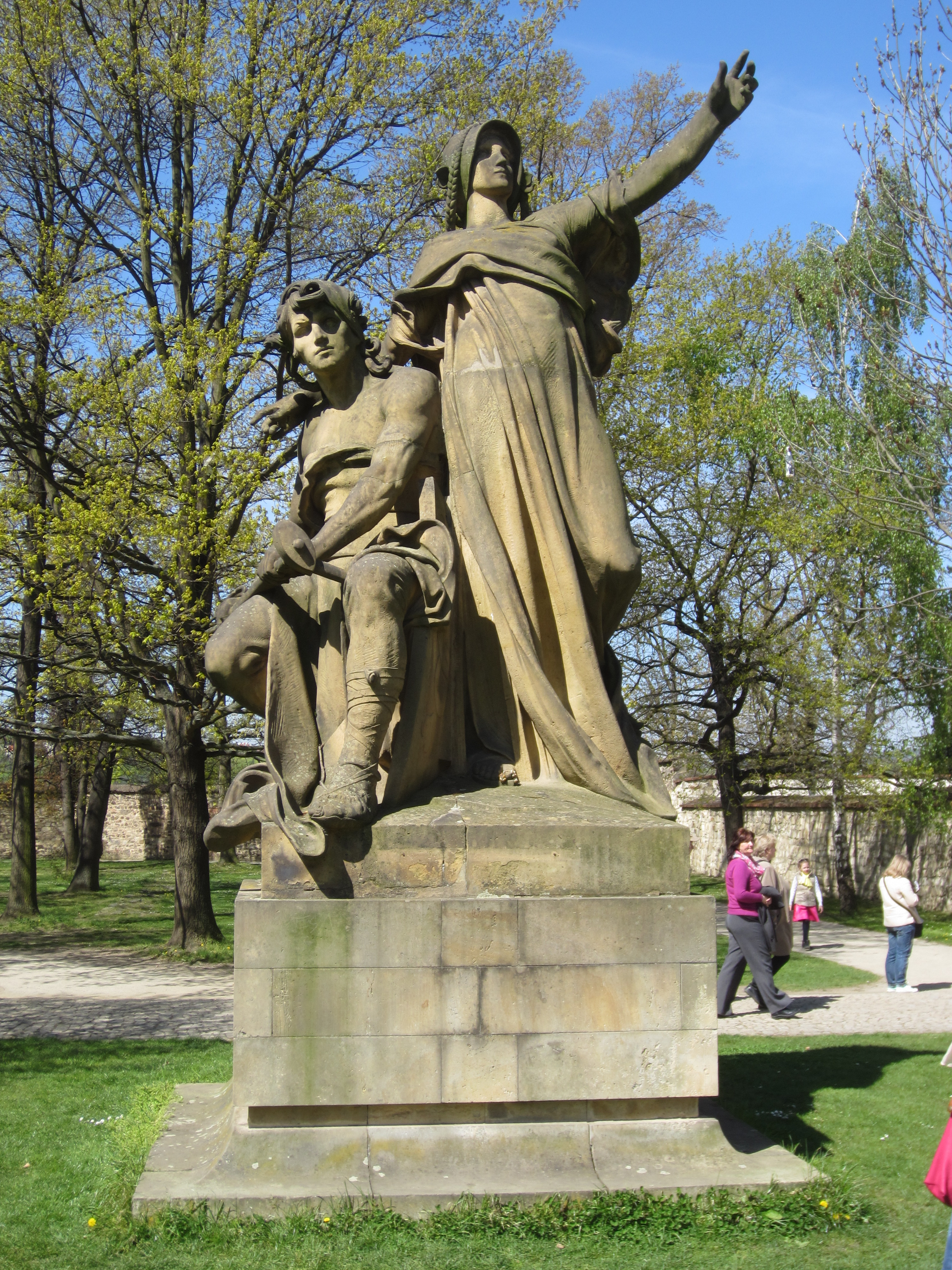
Libuše and Přemysl

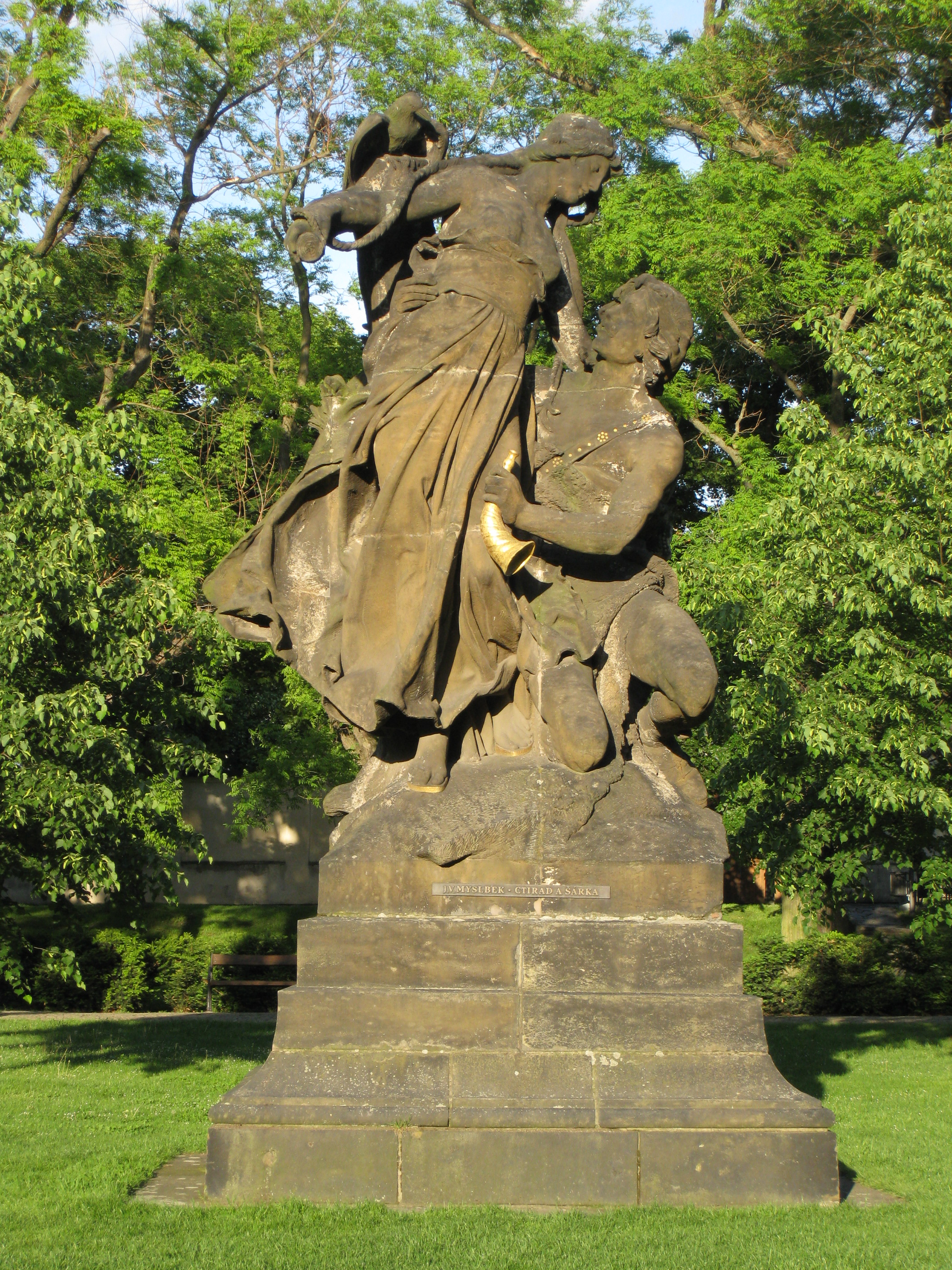
Ctirad and Šárka

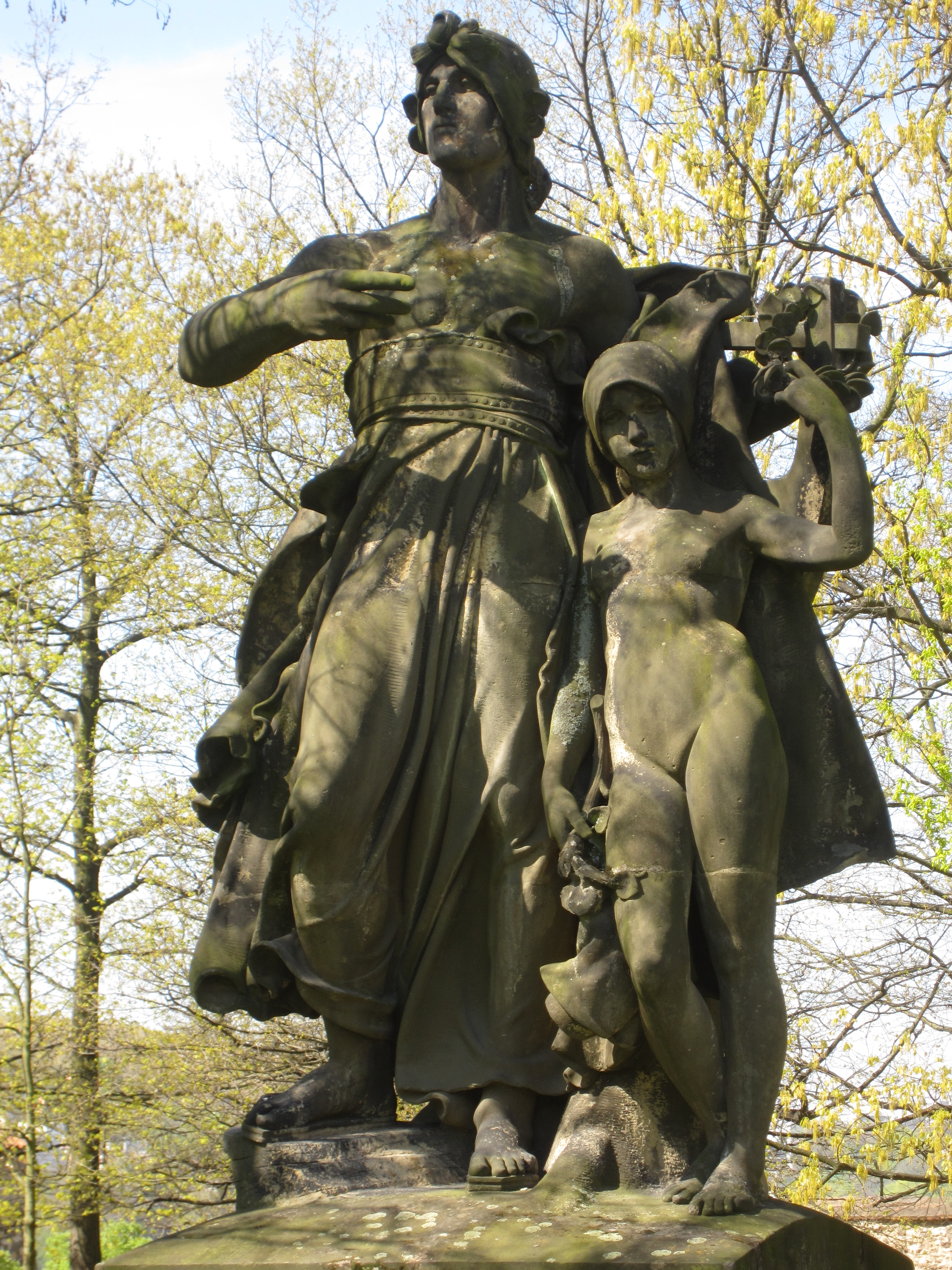
Lumír and Píseň

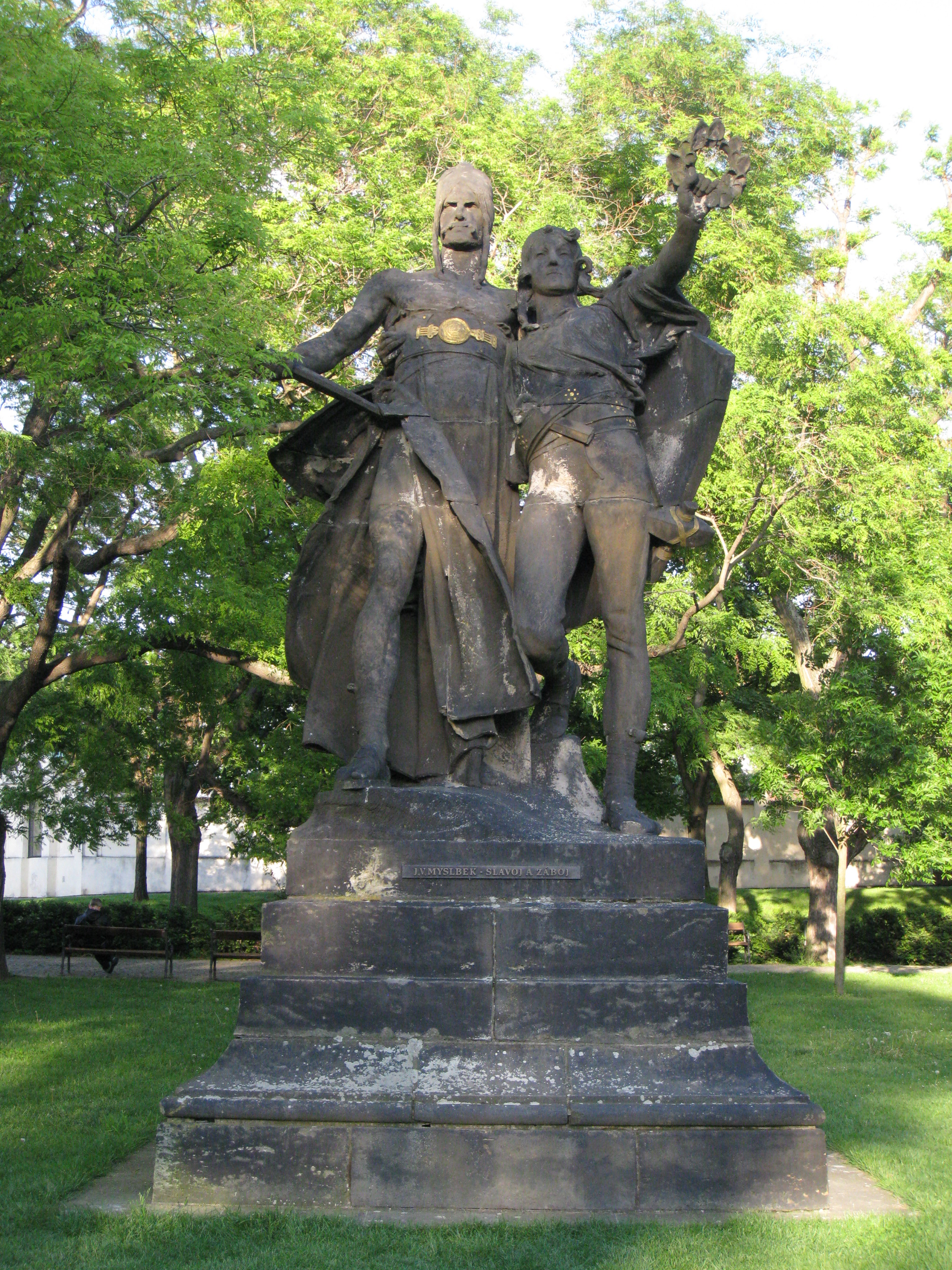
Záboj and Slavoj

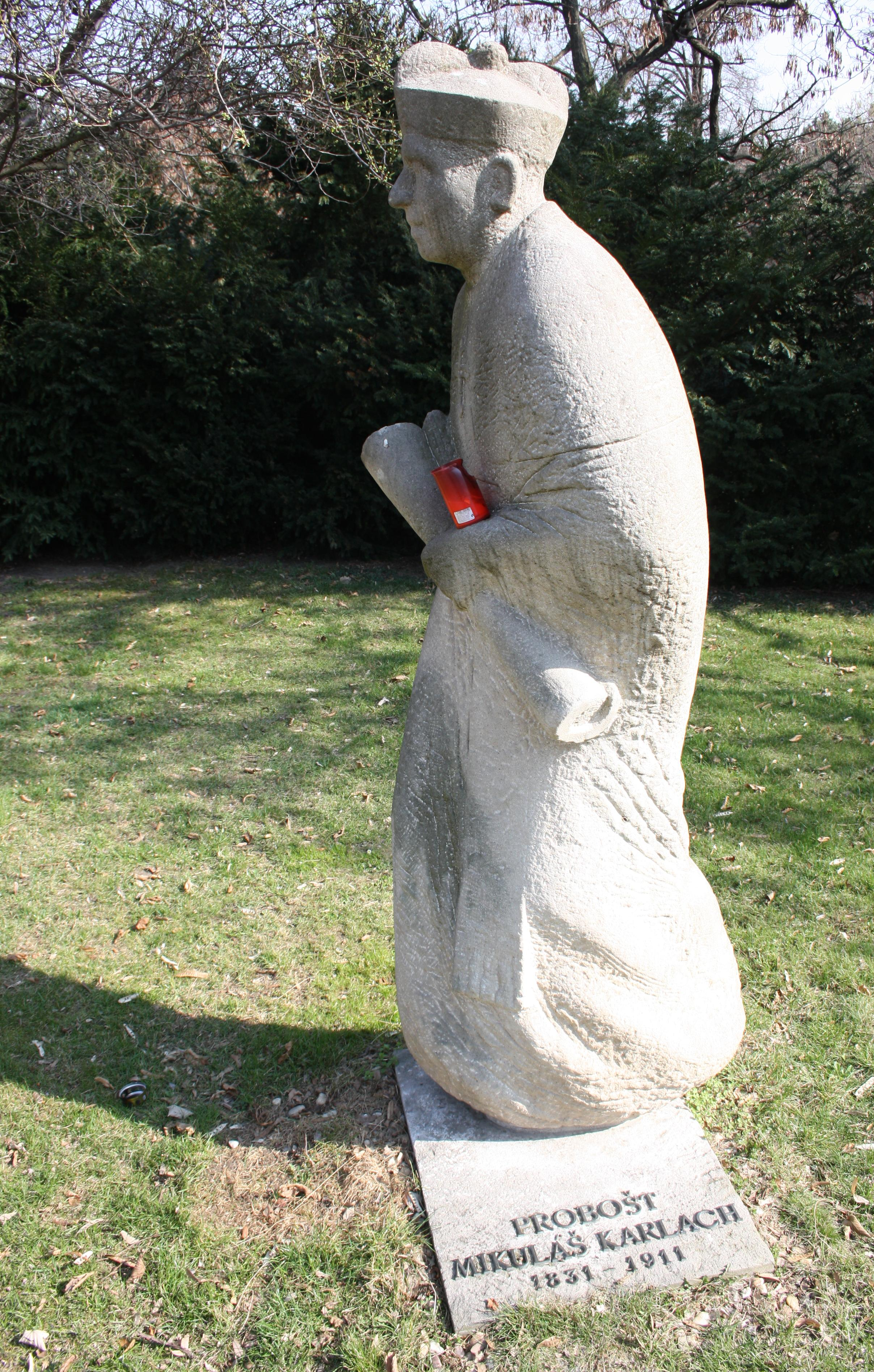
Mikuláš Karlach

== See also ==
- Battle of Vyšehrad
- Libuše
- Má vlast (symphonic poem by Bedřich Smetana including a movement Vyšehrad)
- Church of Our Lady on the Lawn
