= Church of Our Lady on the Lawn =

Church in the Czech Republic

Coordinates: 50.0676°N 14.4215°E

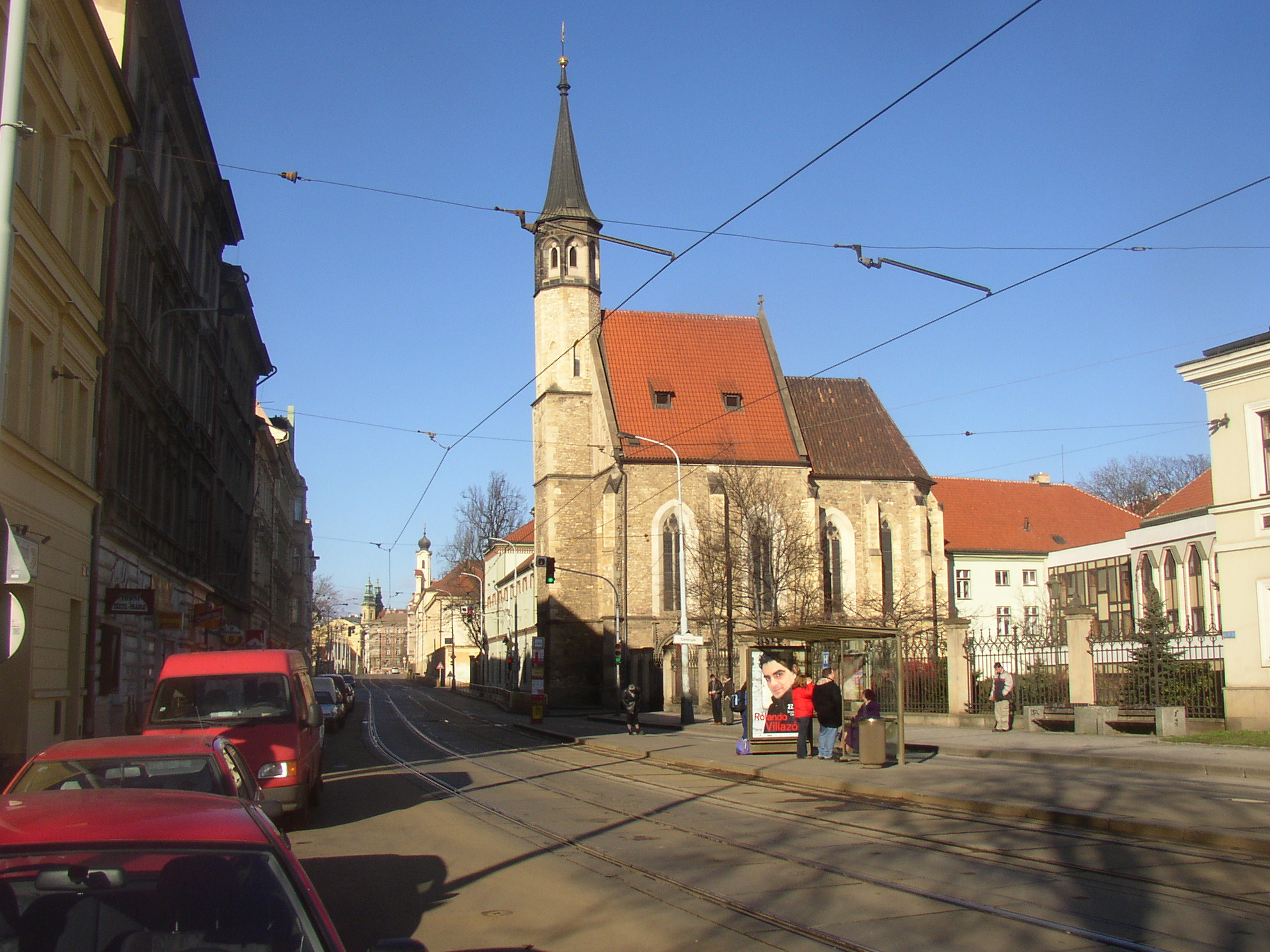
Church of Our Lady on the Lawn

The Gothic Church of Our Lady on the Lawn (Na Slupi) (Czech: Kostel Zvěstování Panny Marie Na trávníčku) is located in the valley of the Prague Botič Stream below Vyšehrad in the New Town. It is quite a small Gothic building which was built beside the monastery of Servites. The church is dedicated to the Annunciation of the Virgin Mary. The church and the monastery have been listed as historical monuments since 1958. The church was founded 24 March 1360 by Charles IV. and was built between 1360 and 1375. Its current look is mostly in pseudo-Gothic.

== Naming ==
The oldest naming for this church and the whole monastery is "in viridi" (on green). The naming was later changed to "on the little grass", probably due to the green grasslands in the valley of Botič creek, where the church was founded. In the Middle Ages the church and the monastery were called, like the adjoining stream, simply "Botič".

Today's usual naming "Na Slupi" has its origin in the 16th century and it is deduced from "slup" – tanks for fish which were placed in the Botič.

== History ==
The order of Servites or the order of servants of the Virgin Mary was created in the 13th century and their goal was unlimited respect to the Virgin Mary. According to tradition the apparition happened in 1233 on the day of Ascension. The apparition influenced the seven Florentines who gave up their existing lives and went to Monte Senario where they founded a monastery. The Servite Order showed up in Prague for the first time in 1360.

=== The period of Charles IV ===
The legend says that King Charles IV promised in front of the painting in the Florentine monastery of Servites that he would build a monastery for this order in the Czech lands as thanks for his cure. Another possible impulse for founding the monastery could have been an effort to reinforce the deteriorating religious life in Bohemia and above all in Prague in the second half of the 14th century. Charles IV asked pope Innocent VI for permission to set up a new monastery in Prague in 1359 and was granted permission. The monastery was founded in 1360 and the construction of the church started immediately. According to Beneš of Weitmile (the chronicler) the church was established next to the older chapel of the Virgin Mary.

=== Period of Hussite Wars ===
During the Hussite period the monastery was robbed by Prague's citizens in 1420 and probably also burnt down. The monks from the monastery were probably in exile at that time. The monastery Na Slupi was between the two fighting sides and on 15 September 1420 the inhabitants of Prague built two big catapults near the choir of the monastery church. Both weapons were destroyed by the defenders. Then the inhabitants of Prague broke through the southern wall, they put a big cannon in the nave of the church and were able to aim directly at besieging the royal garrison in Vyšehrad. For this reason, the nave was newly vaulted in the late-Gothic period (it is estimated that the vaulting was constructed from 1436 to 1480).

The Servites probably returned to the monastery shortly after the ending of Hussite Wars which is obvious from documented financial gift to the monastery in 1439. The repair of the church took place after 1480. It was mostly financed by financial support of various donors. The citizen of the New Town Mikuláš Replík had donated a bell to the church although this bell was removed from the belfry by the parishioners of the Church of Saint Adalbert. And they placed the bell to their church. Through the numerous donations the monastery was very poor and around 1480 the monks left it. Then monastery passed to the royal holding.

The monks from the Church of Saint Adalbert bought a new bell to the church Na Slupi in 1498. The church was at that time represented by Švábs from Chvatlin, Duchk and Mikuláš. Their symbol is visible at the keystone of the vault inside the church.

The monastery was still very poor. The building was half ruined and in 1554 the last prior, and at that time the only monk in monastery, Ondřej Bergmann, wrote a letter to the abbot in Karlov where he entrusted himself and the church under his protection. The abbot of Augustinian order agreed with this proposal.

=== The period after the Battle of White Mountain ===
The next fate of the monastery and other buildings is not clear. The Church of Our Lady on the Lawn continued to be in the holding of the church in Karlov. Servites had a considerable influence at Vienna court which they used after the Battle of White Mountain to get means for renewal the monastery. The monastery returned to the order in 1626. Three monks settled in the monastery which was subordinated to Servites monastery of Saint Michal in the Old Town.

The unstable period around the year 1648 did not allowed bigger construction works in monastery. There were made only the most urgent repairs. It was decided about the reconstruction after the general prior of the order visited the monastery. The reparation took place several years later during the 1760s. Seventeen monks lived in the monastery in 1710. The reconstruction of the buildings finished in 1726. The Servites's highlighting period was on the beginning of the 18th century. The number of supporters and donors was growing. The monastery bought near so called Dlouhoveský house with chapel in 1707, which the monastery afterwards sold to establish the convent of Alžbětinky.

=== The Age of Enlightenment ===
The monastery was seriously damaged by bombs during the Seven Years' War in 1757. There was general resentment toward the European monastic life in the following period of the Age of Enlightenment. The New Town and the Old Town monasteries were merged in 1783. The Servite order was cancelled on 23. 6. 1786. The Church of Our Lady on the Lawn was secularized in 1783. The monastery became an artillery barracks in the years 1785 – 1792, then it was a lodging house and then it became a military educational institute in the years 1822–1850.

=== 19th century ===
The monastery was enlarged and rebuilt in 1856 in order to place there the institute of mentally ill. The church was sanctified again in 1856.

The architect and the historian of the art Bernard Grueber (1806-1882) was in charge of numerous pseudo-gothic repairs. The repairs took place in the years 1858-1863 (another source states years 1856–58). The two-storied building of the former monastery is known in this pseudo-gothic form. The monastery was rebuilt in 1910 and currently there is located the Skin Clinic of the Charles University. A big part of the current look of the church can be attributed to Grueber, including the internal furnishing of the church in the pseudo-gothic style. There was built choir and low roof of the presbytery was raised. Grueber also designed the new interior, such as the altar partition, doors, altars, pulpit, candlesticks and monstrance.

The last major reconstruction of the church was in years 1914-1916 when the inner plastering was replaced with the brickwork. The reconstruction was directed by the builder František Schlaffer.

== The Equipment of the church ==
The church was filled with baroque furniture during the 18th century and it received new altar in 1732. After cancelling the Servites Order in Prague and unhollying the church its artistic inventor had been spread. The monastery has received some paintings and sculptures, four of them we can still see in their church. We can see a copy of Florentine painting Annunciation Virgin Mary in the monastery.

The equipment in the church comes from the period of the architect Bernard Grueber and it is mostly in the pseudo-gothic style. There is a painting of Annunciation Virgin Mary on the main altar from 1857 by Leopold Kupelwieser. There are two side altars on the sides of victory arch, the altar of Saint Anna on the south wall and the altar of Saint Joseph on the north wall. The organs and holly water font are from Grueber's workshop.

=== Gravestones ===
There are several gravestones in the church. The gravestone behind the altar bears the name Jan Petr Dejma from Střítěž. There is a sunken ledger in the choir which covers a tomb of Servites. There is a gravestone in the nave which bears name of baron Schönebeck. There is a gravestone of Magdalena Premerová under the choir on the north wall and there is a gravestone of Marie Jakobína Schadnerová on the south wall.

== The Architecture ==
The orientation of the church is traditional, the altar is oriented to the east. The main nave of the church does not have completely dominate position and there is not a trial for monumentality and strong verticalization which is typical for the earlier period of gothic. The original parts of the church come from the period of the Caroline gothic and this church is an illustration of diversity and variety of New Town's religious architecture of that time.

The shield of the nave significantly exceeds the roof of the choir. The west facade is rather plain and a third of the facade occupies a prismatic four-sided tower. Almost a whole north side of the church is hidden by the buildings of the former monastery.

=== Parts of the church ===
The church consists of three parts: choir, nave and tower. The choir consists of one vault field and five-sided closing. The ground plan of the nave is almost a square, just like the ground plan of the tower which stands in the axis of west facade of the church.

=== The windows ===
There are slender pointed windows with new tracery between the rests, simple window in the end of choir, the north window is immured and the south window is two part with new flame tracery. The original bevelled mouldings are preserved only in the end of church, otherwise they are covered with plaster. There were penetrated new portals in the western half of the nave. The portals have pointed arch with pinnacles on the sides. The current look of the portals was created by the architect Grueber.

=== The interior ===
The size of the nave is 9, 5 x 9, 65 x 12 metres.

The choir was built in the pseudo-gothic style together with a noticeable renewed ledge along the choir. The rounded vault supports run out from the ledge. There are consoles from modern period under the ledge. The supports have calyx-shaped capitals and they are covered with carved grapevine and cabbage leaves. There are linden leaves on the supports too.

=== The keystones ===
The keystone in the choir ending bears a board with a relief of the Czech lion. There are family signs and a shield which depicts a hand with two open fingers on the keystones in the eastern part. There is stylized rosette and a sign of family Šváby from Chvatliny on the keystones in the west part. The sign represents a gate between two towers with battlements where is a standing sheep. The frontal arcs have grooved profile.

=== The main nave ===
The main nave space is unique because it is vaulted on the single middle slender cylindrical pillar which supports the vault. The pillar has a cylindrical pedestal, simple base and small ring in the upper part. The vault ribs are connected to the pillar through small corbels. The main nave is almost a square. The both west square fields have a cross-ribbed vault.

=== The choir ===
There is a pseudo-gothic entrance to the sacristy on the northern side of the choir ending. The sacristy is rectangular and it is arched with barrel vault. The choir is arched with one rectangular field with cross-ribbed vault in front and with radial vault at the end. There are simple ribs in the choir. We can find pseudo gothic pulpit in the southwest corner and also pseudo-gothic oratory in the west part of the church. The oratory is accessible from the first floor through the wide arcade. There is an entrance and a new spiral stairs to the tower in the west wall. The entrance to the chapel was built in the 19th century and it is under the oratory.

=== Exterior ===
The outer layout of the nave is similar to the choir, on the three loose corners there are supports put up diagonally.

=== The tower ===
There is a slim tower in the front facade which has height 38 metres. The tower has in its lower part a shape of four-sided prism. There are two ledges, the first one is in the height of the ledge which is placed under the windows of the nave and the second one in the height of the main ledge of the nave. The tower continues with another narrowed floor and with pointed arch. This part of the tower has three floors of various heights. Above the second ledge there is another eight-sided part with two little windows with pointed arches. The thickness of the brickwork is around 80 centimetres. The Baroque onion-domed roof was replaced by Grueber with the pyramidal roof which is there up to now.

This tower is unique among all of the Prague towers because its diversion from the vertical is 63 centimetres towards the street Na Slupi.

Both of the shields of the nave have the panelling from restoration in the 19th century.

There is nothing left from the gothic monastery and current appearance of the buildings of the former monastery is determined by the modification in the 19th century.

== Curiosities ==
The position of the significant buildings built in times of Charles IV. is supposedly determined by celestial symbolism and Christian mysticism. Five churches founded by Charles IV. create regular cross. Cross of the buildings meant a special blessing to the town in the Middle Ages.

== Gallery ==
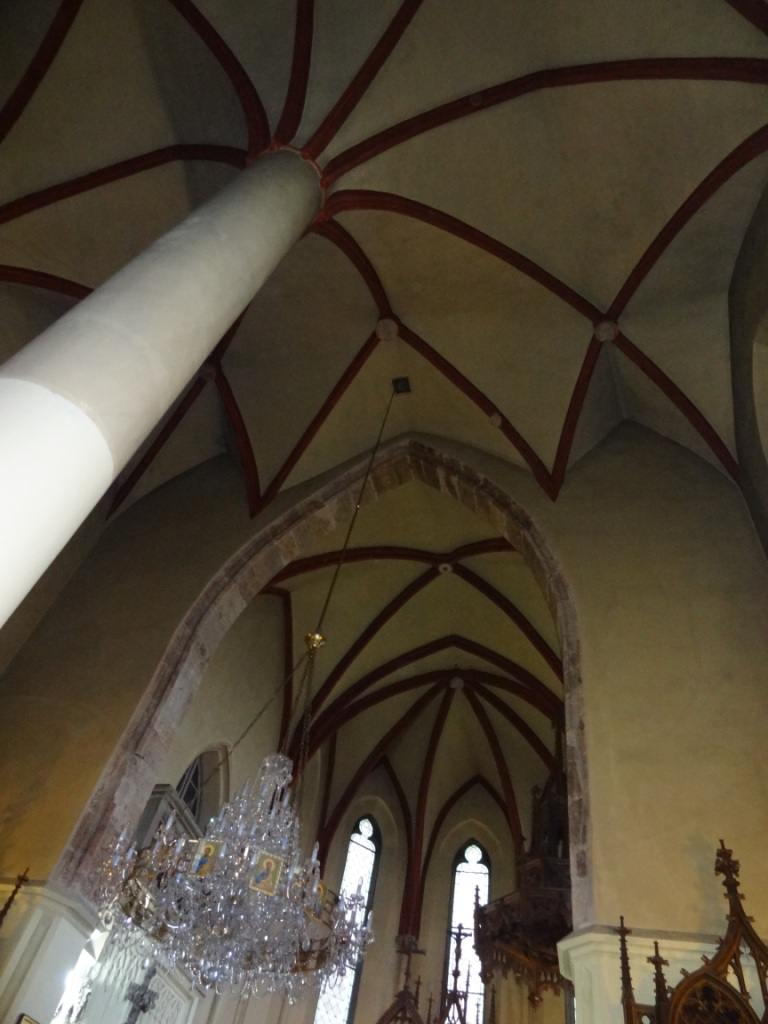
Vault

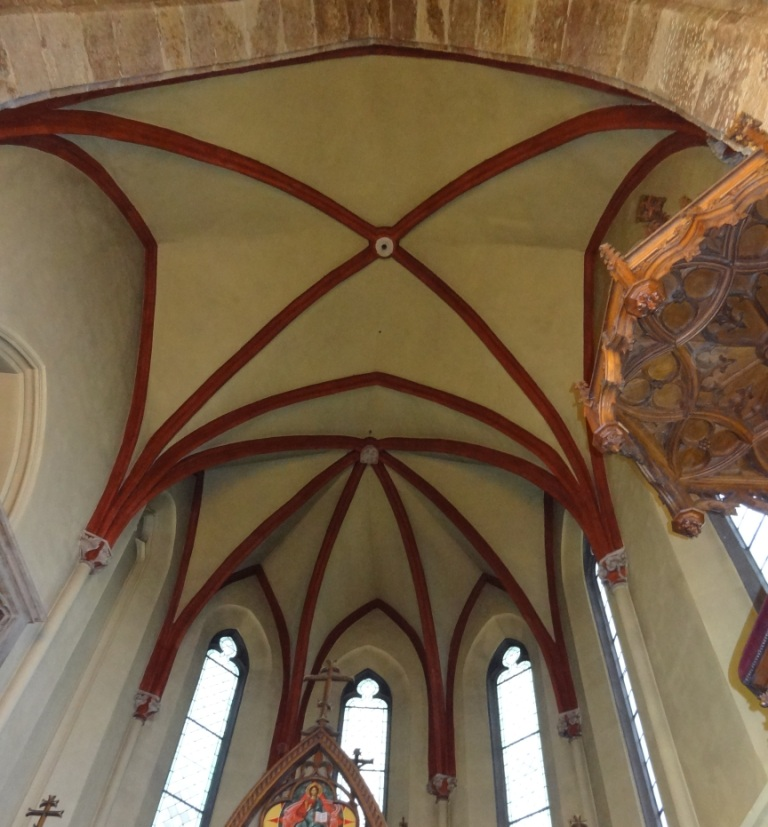
Vault of the ending of the presbytery

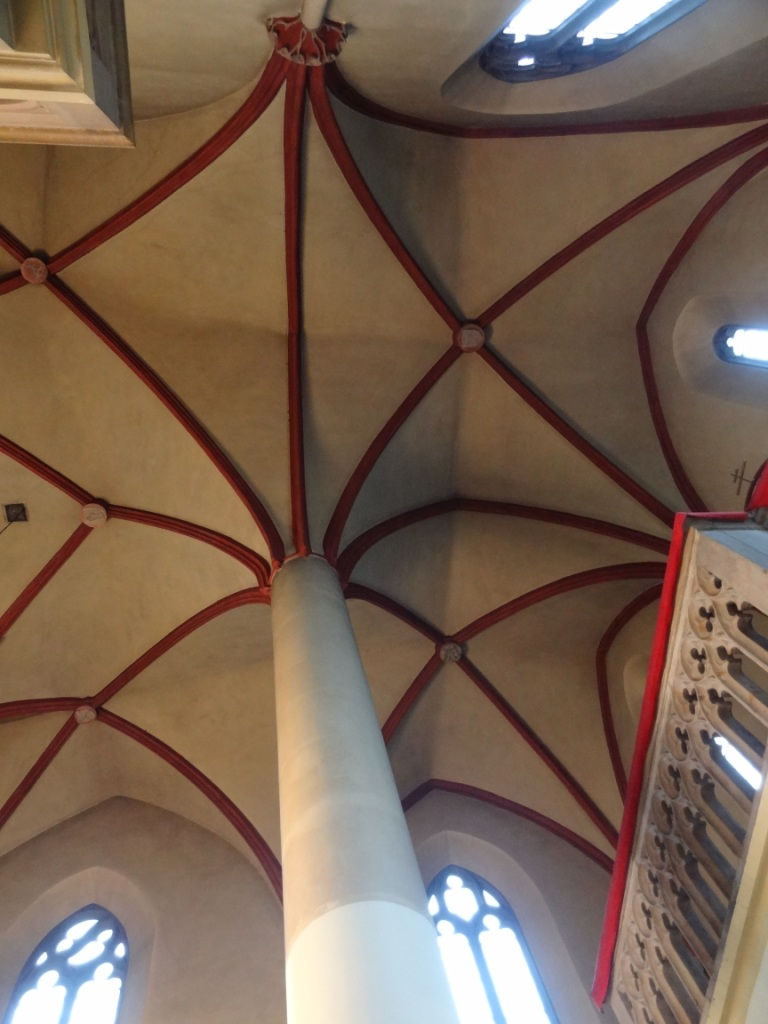
View to the vault and its connection with the column

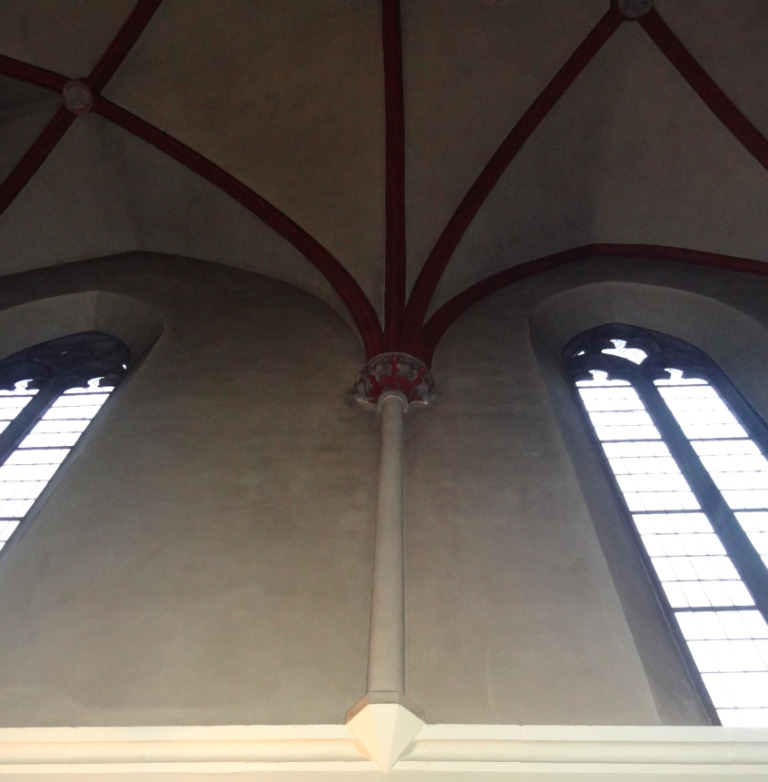
Details of the ribs and its connection to the wall

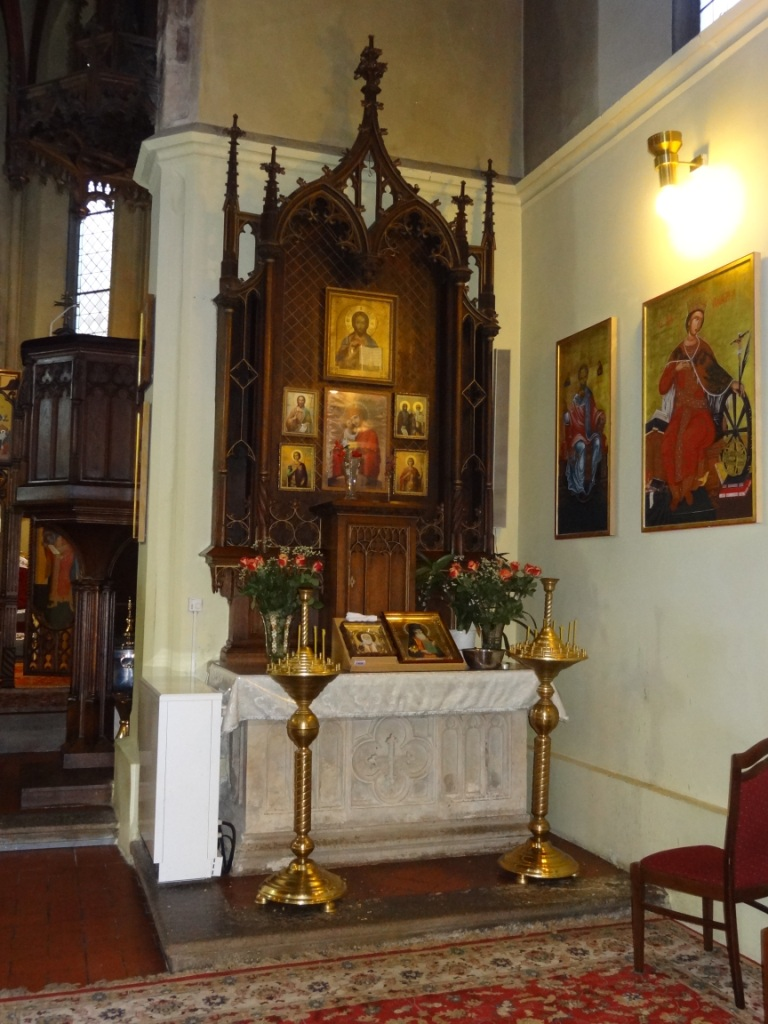
Altar of Saint Anne

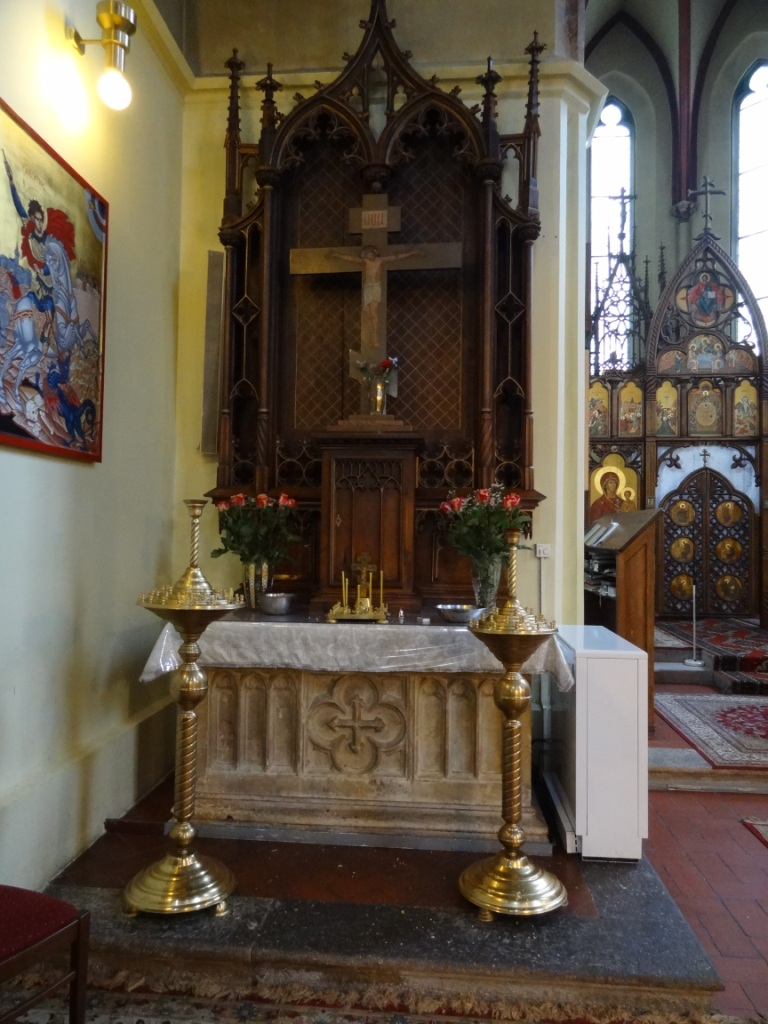
Altar of Saint Joseph

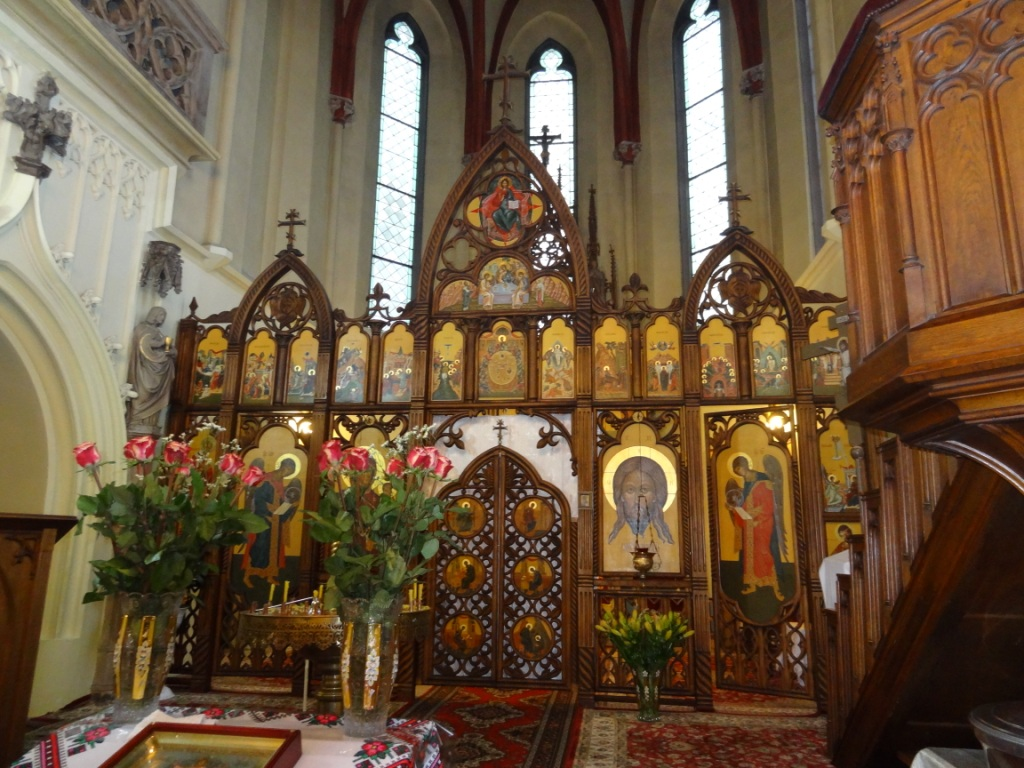
Ikonostas

== Bibliography ==
- BENEŠOVSKÁ, CHOTĚBOR, DURDÍK, PLAČEK, PRIX, RAZIM. Architecture of the Gothic, 2001, ISBN 80-86-161-41-2.
- STAŇKOVÁ, ŠTORSA, VODĚRA. Prague: Eleven Centuries of Architecture, 1996, ISBN 978-80-900003-1-5.
- BAŤKOVÁ, Růžena a kol.:Umělecké památky Prahy (Nové Město, Vyšehrad), Praha: Academia 1998, ISBN 80-200-0627-3.
- LÍBAL, Dobroslav. Kostel Panny Marie na Trávníčku v Praze. Vyd. 1. Praha: Umělecká beseda, 1948, 29 s.
- ŠINOROVÁ, Anna. Kláštery Řádu služebníků Panny Marie v Praze. Praha, 2011. Dostupné z: https://is.cuni.cz/webapps/zzp/detail/97952/?lang=cs. Bakalářská práce. Univerzita Karlova v Praze, Pedagogická fakulta, Katedra dějin a didaktiky dějepisu, Specializace v pedagogice. Vedoucí práce Mgr. Dušan Foltýn, s. 31.
- POCHE, Emanuel. Praha středověká: čtvero knih o Praze. 1. vyd. Praha: Panorama, 1983, 780 pages. OCLC 10458466, pages. 233–239.
- POCHE, Emanuel a Josef JANÁČEK. Prahou krok za krokem: Uměleckohistorický průvodce městem. 1. vyd. b. m.: Orbis, Pražské nakladatelství V. Poláčka, 1948, 255 s. ISBN 80-7185-373-9.
- KALINA, Pavel. Praha 1310–1419: kapitoly o vrcholné gotice. 1. vyd. Praha: Libri, 2004, 237 s. ISBN 80-727-7161-2.
