= Basilica of St. Peter and St. Paul, Prague =

Basilica of St. Peter and St. Paul
- The Basilica and Royal Collegiate Church of St. Peter and St. Paul
- Bazilika svatého Petra a Pavla
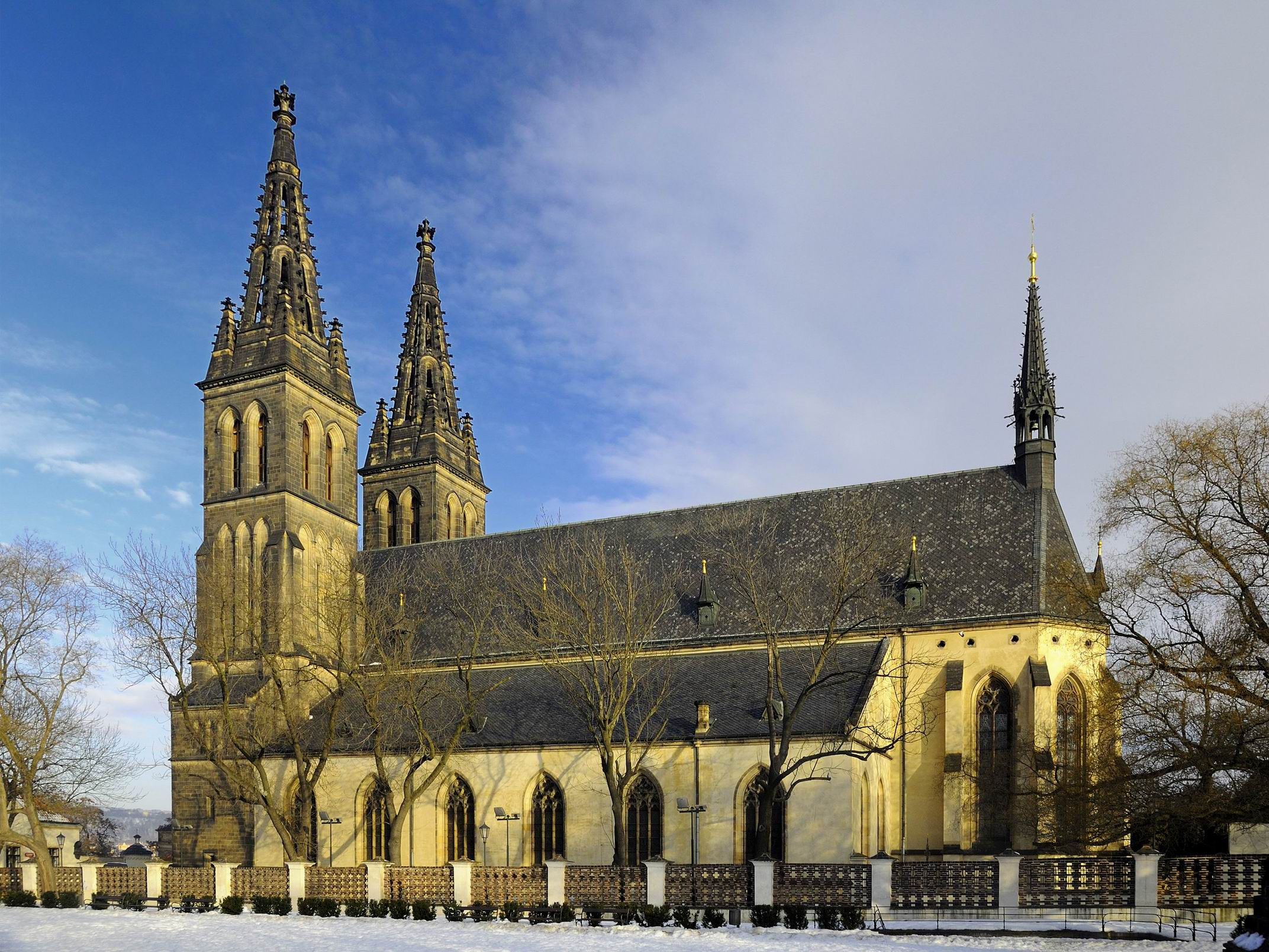

- Location in Prague
- 50°03′52″N 14°25′04″E
- Location: Prague
- Country: Czech Republic
- Denomination: Roman Catholic
- Website: www.kkvys.cz

History
- Status: Active
- Founded: 1070–1080
- Founder: Vratislaus II of Bohemia
- Dedication: Saint Peter and Saint Paul

Architecture
- Functional status: Collegiate church Parish church
- Style: Neo-Gothic
- Years built: 1887–1903

Administration
- Archdiocese: Prague
- Parish: Vyšehrad

Clergy
- Archbishop: Dominik Duka
- Dean: Tomáš Holub

The Basilica of St. Peter and St. Paul (Czech: Bazilika svatého Petra a Pavla) is a neo-Gothic collegiate and parish church in Vyšehrad fortress in Prague, Czech Republic.

Founded in 1070–1080 by the King Vratislaus II of Bohemia, the Romanesque basilica suffered a fire in the year 1249 and has been rebuilt in Gothic and later in neo-Gothic style. The basilica features an impressive stone mosaic above its entry, and its twin 58 m towers can be seen atop a hill to the south from along the Vltava River in central Prague.

Behind the church is located large park and Vyšehrad cemetery, the final resting place of many famous Czechs, including author Karel Čapek and composer Antonín Dvořák. In 2003 the church was elevated to basilica by Pope John Paul II.

== Exterior ==
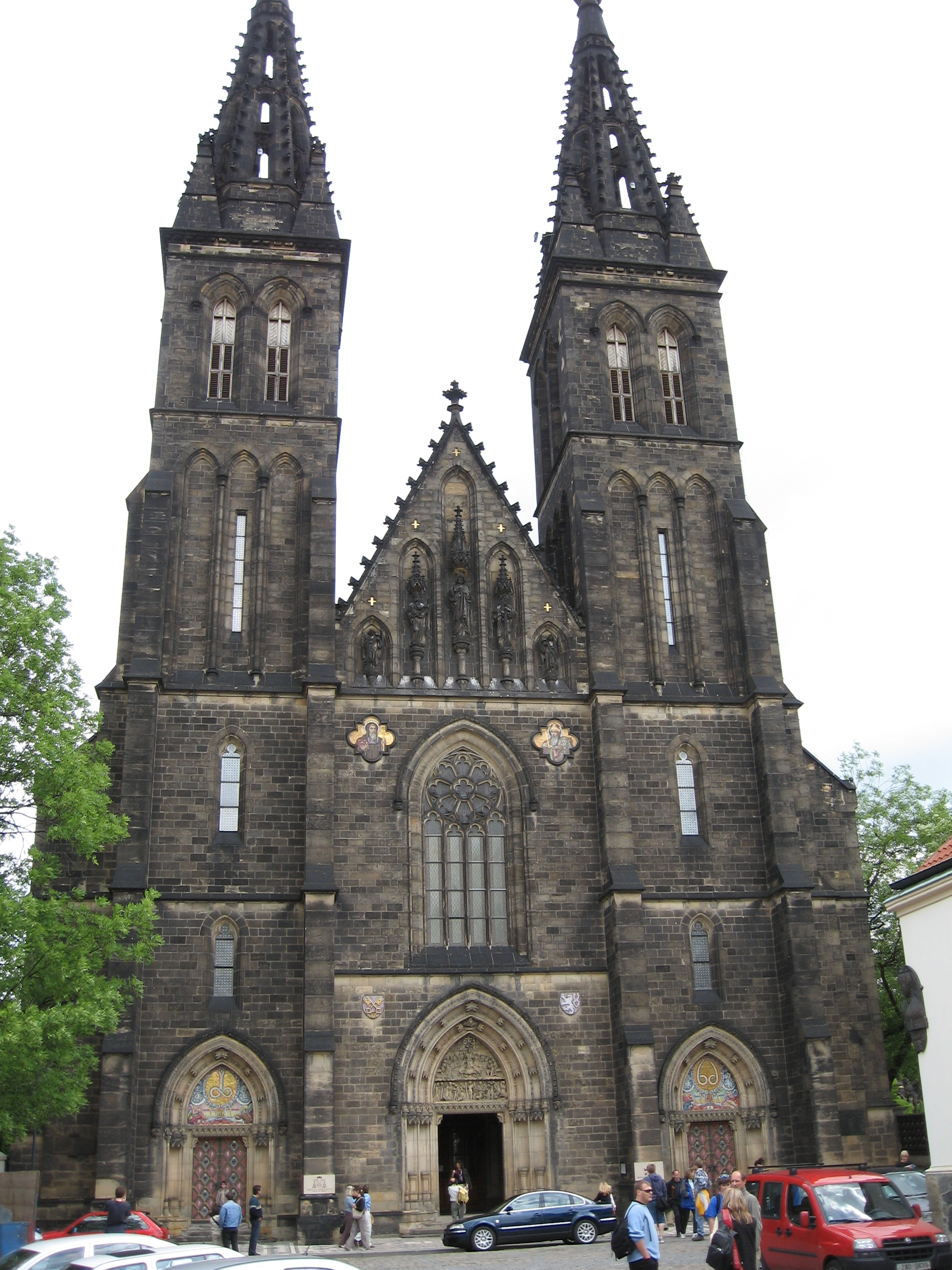
Front of the basilica

The current building itself is a neo-Gothic basilica. It was constructed between 1887 and 1903. The first master builder was Joseph Mocker but he died mid-way through construction. It was finished by his partner František Mikš who modified the façade and tower designs from Mocker's original plans. The main part of the church consists of a nave with two side aisles; a large choir, sanctuary and apse; and two side rooms which hold a sacristy and a chapel for Panna Maria Šancovská Our Lady of the Ramparts.

There is no transept. Structurally, the building is quite vertical, its ceiling is cross vaulted and the pointed arched windows let in the sun's light through stained glass. A few meters east of where the church now stands beyond the cemetery walls the original foundations from the apse of the old Gothic church were excavated. The old apse and the new apse are designed in the same fashion; they are both buttressed and have the same number of buttresses.

The western façade features three vestibules, two towers, and a crowning triangular gable between the towers. The main portal tympanum is decorated by Jesus standing with his apostles. Below them the archangel Michael stands between people being ushered to heaven by angels, and people crippled by the suffering of sin. On the gable face stand sculptures of the basilica's namesake saints Peter and Paul with angels and Jesus.

Another interesting feature of the St. Paul and Peter's Basilica design is the spires, which are hollow. They have slender holes making the tops of the towers light and elegant reminiscent of the conic formation of the chestnut flowers one can find blooming in trees along the walkways in the Vyšehrad complex. The spires (and indeed the triangular gable of the façade between them) are frilled with petal like finial protrusions along their length and on their tops, further connecting their likeness to the flower.

== Interior ==
History is the dominant element thematically of the interior décor; the history of art, Christianity and the Czech lands are all aspects of the decoration. As a piece of art history the church is something of an exhibition of Gothic, art nouveau and even Baroque pieces.

Along with the design of the building the main altar, the pulpit, and all the smaller altars in the side chapels are neo Gothic as well. They are intricately carved with mini-spires and tracery throughout. Even the organ which sits above the entrance has hollow spires matching those of the western towers. In addition, each chapel contains Gothic revival paintings. The theme of the stained glass windows is the history of Gothic architecture; each window portrays Jesus before a different Gothic or neo-Gothic church. Completing the tribute to the Gothic style is a large fresco at the eastern end of the northern aisle of the first Gothic church to stand on the spot. The original picture copied for the painting is taken from the book by J.F. Hammerschmidt Gloria et majestas sacrosanctae, regiae, exemptae et nullius diaecesis Wissehradensis ss. Apostolorum Petri et Pauli from the year 1700, but its architectural accuracy must be questioned because it is a romantic engraving made over 100 years after the Gothic church existed.

Also, in each chapel are large baroque paintings from the 16th century, maintaining the link to another part of the church's past; the last building to be on the spot was a baroque church built in the first quarter of the 18th century. It had no towers, but the façade was quite decorative including a great number of ionic pillars.

Seemingly every inch of the walls, pillars and ceilings is covered with the ornate, flowing decoration of the painter František Urban and his wife Marie Urbanová-Zahradnická inspired by Alfons Mucha. Nameless winged women flank the archways from the nave and fill the vault sections of the arcades. Up the pillars and along every picture's border run floral patterns and colourful ribbons. The vivid greens and browns which cover the entirety of the interior create a feeling of being inside a forest. The ceiling of the nave is dark green, as if it is a canopy in shadow. Even the brown wooden benches on the ground for the beholders of church services are ornately carved with oak leaves.

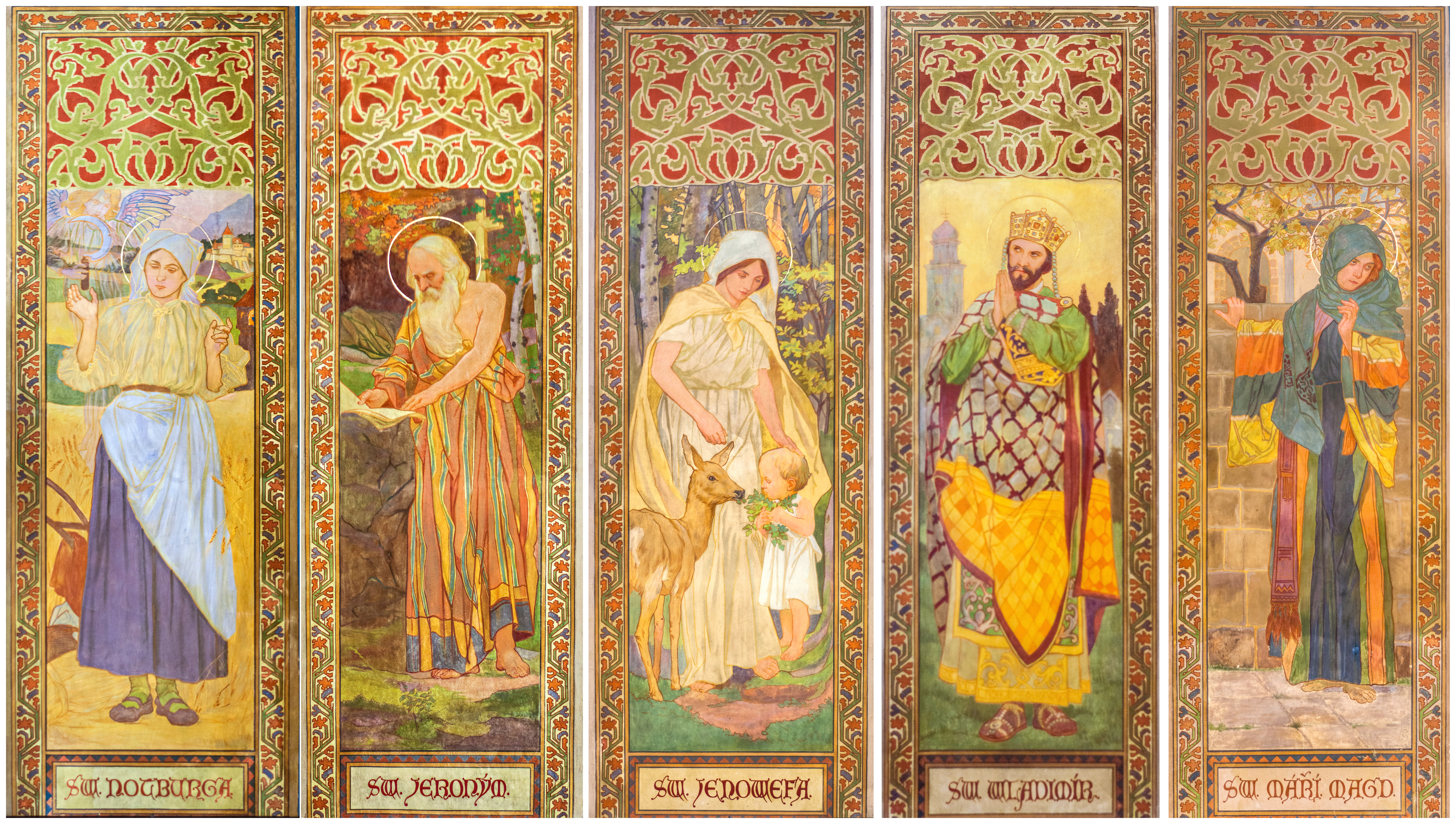
Frescoes in the Basilica of Saints Peter and Paul

== Restoration ==
The Basilica is undergoing significant roof restoration due to damage and leaks. The project involves replacing the original slate tiles with new ones imported from the United States and Spain, adhering to the design by architect Josef Mocker. The restoration, estimated to cost around CZK 45 million, is supported by subsidies from the Ministry of Culture and the Prague City Council, with additional funds raised through public collections and the sale of commemorative items.The restoration of the basilica is to be completed in 2029.
